= 2017 French Socialist Party presidential primary =

2017 Socialist Party presidential primary
- 22 and 29 January 2017
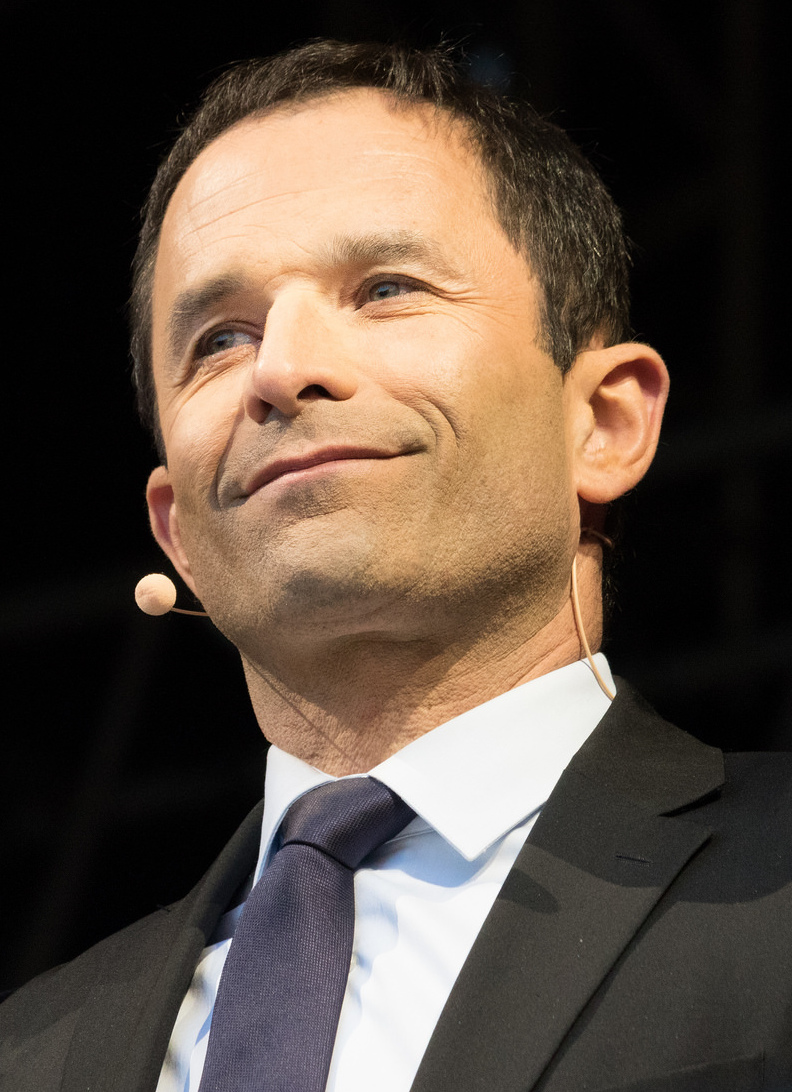

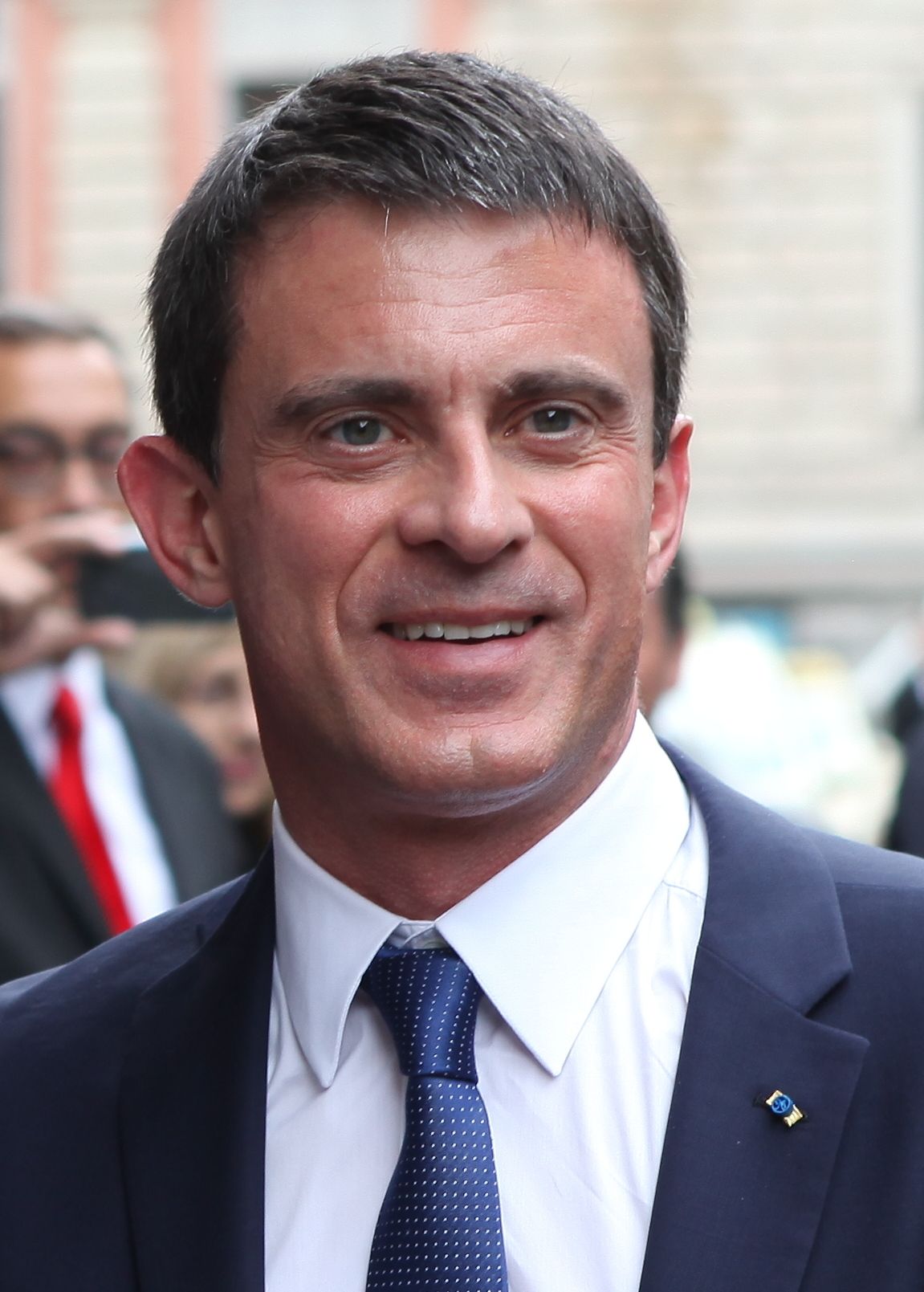
Candidate	Benoît Hamon	Manuel Valls
Party	PS	PS
Popular vote	596,647	521,238
Share	36.51%	31.90%
Popular vote (runoff)	1,181,872	831,871
Share (runoff)	58.69%	41.31%
- Results of the first round by department and region

- Results of the second round by department and region
Previous Socialist nominee
François Hollande
Presumptive Socialist nominee
Benoît Hamon

The French Socialist Party held a two-round presidential primary to select a candidate for the 2017 presidential election on 22 and 29 January 2017. It was the second open primary (primaires citoyennes) held by the centre-left coalition, after the primary in 2011 in which François Hollande defeated Martine Aubry to become the Socialist nominee. Hollande went on to defeat incumbent Nicolas Sarkozy in the 2012 presidential election. However, because of his low approval rating, he announced that he would not seek re-election, becoming the first president of the Fifth Republic to decide not to run for a second term. The primary was contested by seven candidates, four from the Socialist Party and three representing other parties part of the left-wing electoral alliance (la Belle Alliance populaire).

The three frontrunners in the first round of the primary were Manuel Valls, who served as Hollande's Prime Minister from 2014 to 2016 and interior minister from 2012 to 2014; Benoît Hamon, Minister of National Education in 2014; and Arnaud Montebourg, Minister of the Economy, Production Recovery and the Digital Sector from 2012 to 2014. On 22 January, Hamon received 36.03% and Valls 31.48% of the vote in the first round and advanced to the runoff, far ahead of all other candidates and well ahead of Montebourg, who was eliminated and immediately endorsed Hamon. In the runoff, Hamon easily defeated Valls, beating the ex-PM by nearly 20 percentage points, and officially took the mantle as nominee of the PS in the 2017 presidential election.

== Background ==
At the 2012 Toulouse Congress, the Socialist Party (PS) modified its statutes to guarantee the selection of a candidate of the left through open primaries, with the National Council of the Socialist Party announcing the timetable and organization of the primaries at least one year beforehand. On 11 January, Libération published an editorial in favor of a "primary of the left and ecologists", and on 9 April the National Council of the Socialist Party unanimously approved the idea of holding such a primary in early December. The same day, Europe Ecology – The Greens (EELV) adopted a motion saying that it would "welcome with interest" such a primary, but withheld formal support. On 18 June, the National Council finally confirmed that it would organize a primary to select a candidate for the 2017 presidential election. Applications could be submitted from 1 to 15 December, with two rounds of voting planned for 22 and 29 January 2017. Under the rules of the primary, candidates of the PS, Radical Party of the Left (PRG), and pro-government ex-EELV forces – i.e., the Ecologist Party (PE) and Union of Democrats and Ecologists (UDE) – in addition to all those who supported the primary process.

The PRG suspended its participation in the Belle Alliance populaire (BAP) of left-wing forces on 29 June 2016, denouncing the Socialist Party's unilateral decision to run a primary, and arguing that the BAP should not become a "simple satellite movement of the Socialist Party". On 2 July, the delegates of the BAP unanimously approved the organization of the primary. The PRG voted to support the candidacy of its party leader Sylvia Pinel, outside the primary, on 26 November, but on 6 December Pinel announced that she would ultimately run in the primary of the left, a decision the party's steering committee confirmed on 14 December. Prospective PS candidates were required to sign the primary's charter of ethics requiring candidates to rally behind its winner and to secure the support of 5% of one of the following groups: members of the National Council; Socialist parliamentarians, regional and departmental Socialist councilors in at least 4 regions and 10 departments; or Socialist mayors representing more than 10,000 people in at least 4 regions and 10 departments. The conditions for becoming a candidate of other member parties of the BAP – the PRG, UDE, PE, and Democratic Front (FD) – were determined by the respective parties' leadership.

The EELV declared on 20 June that it would not participate in the primary, and the French Communist Party (PCF) did likewise the following day. After declaring his candidacy for the presidential election, Emmanuel Macron of En Marche! also declined to participate, as did Jean-Luc Mélenchon under the banner of La France Insoumise, saying that he did not want to run in a primary with François Hollande since he would not be able to support Hollande if he won. He later reaffirmed this by saying that with the exclusion of the EELV and PRG the primary was not truly "of the left" but a "primary of the Socialist Party". On 1 December, Hollande declared that he would not seek a second term, becoming the first President of the Fifth Republic to renounce a reelection bid. His announcement reflected his high personal unpopularity and resentment among Socialist colleagues regarding remarks he made about cabinet members and other associates in the book Un président ne devrait pas dire ça... (A president should not say that...) by Gérard Davet and Fabrice Lhomme, journalists at Le Monde.

On 17 December, the High Authority of the open primary declared that seven candidates qualified to appear on the ballot, including four from the Socialist Party – former Prime Minister Manuel Valls, Arnaud Montebourg, Benoît Hamon, and Vincent Peillon – the other three being François de Rugy of the PE, Sylvia Pinel of the PRG, and Jean-Luc Bennahmias of the PD.

=== Candidacies ===
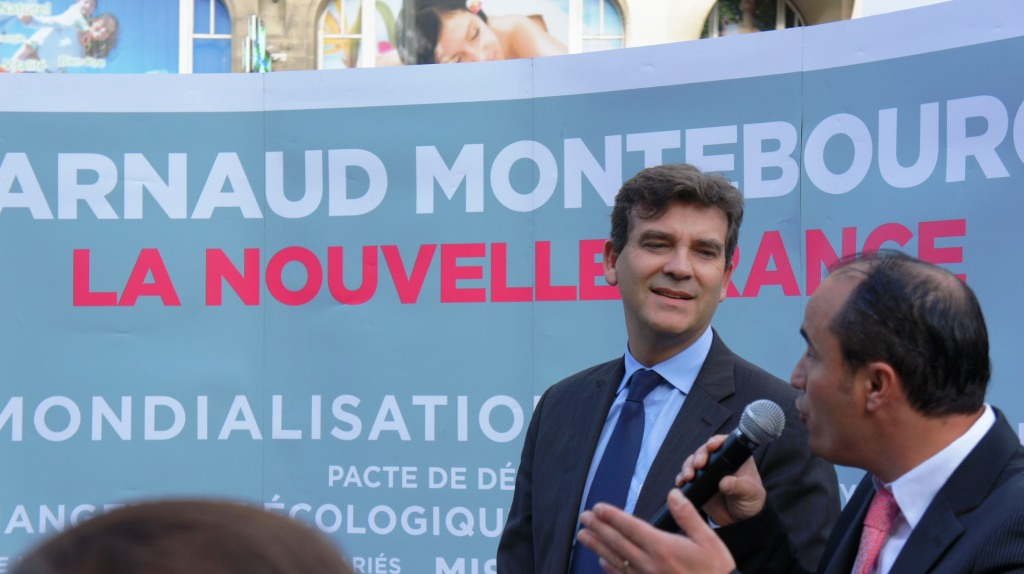
Arnaud Montebourg during his 2011 campaign for the Socialist nomination

Former economy minister Arnaud Montebourg, who also ran for the nomination of the Socialists in 2011, was one of the first to declare interest in a speech at Mont Beuvray on 16 May 2016, widely viewed as indicating his interest in running for the presidency, in which he issued a "call" to "build" a "great alternative project for France" to an audience of 200 Socialist Party militants. Among those in attendance were former minister Aurélie Filippetti, as well as MPs Christian Paul, chief among the party's rebels, having had a part in the foundation of the New Socialist Party caucus along with Montebourg, Laurent Baumel and Patrice Prat. Montebourg officially declared his candidacy on 16 August, decrying Hollande's betrayal of the "ideals of the left" in Frangy-en-Bresse in his home département of Saône-et-Loire, and laid out an anti-globalization campaign platform based on protectionism for French businesses, threats to nationalize predatory banks, and tax breaks for the middle class, themes which became central to his campaign. These themes were reflective of his combative tenure as economy minister, in which he threatened to nationalize divisions of ArcelorMittal and attempted but ultimately failed to prevent General Electric's partial acquisition of French multinational Alstom.

Former French education minister Benoît Hamon, another founder of the New Socialist Party caucus, declared his candidacy on the same day, arguing that Hollande could "no longer earn the French people's trust" and proposed to raise the minimum wage, to further reduce the 35-hour workweek instituted by the Socialists in 2000 to 32 hours, a €35 billion stimulus for the French economy, and legalizing marijuana. His signature campaign plan, however, was his intention to introduce a €300–400 billion universal basic income program funded by a tax on robots, equivalent to a monthly income of approximately €750 per person. Like Montebourg, he was ejected from the Socialist government by prime minister Manuel Valls in a wider purge of left-wing dissenters after the fall of the First Valls Government in August 2014. On 1 December 2016, incumbent President François Hollande announced in a televised address from the Élysée Palace that he would not seek a second term in office, clearing the way for Valls to enter the race, who subsequently announced his candidacy on 5 December.

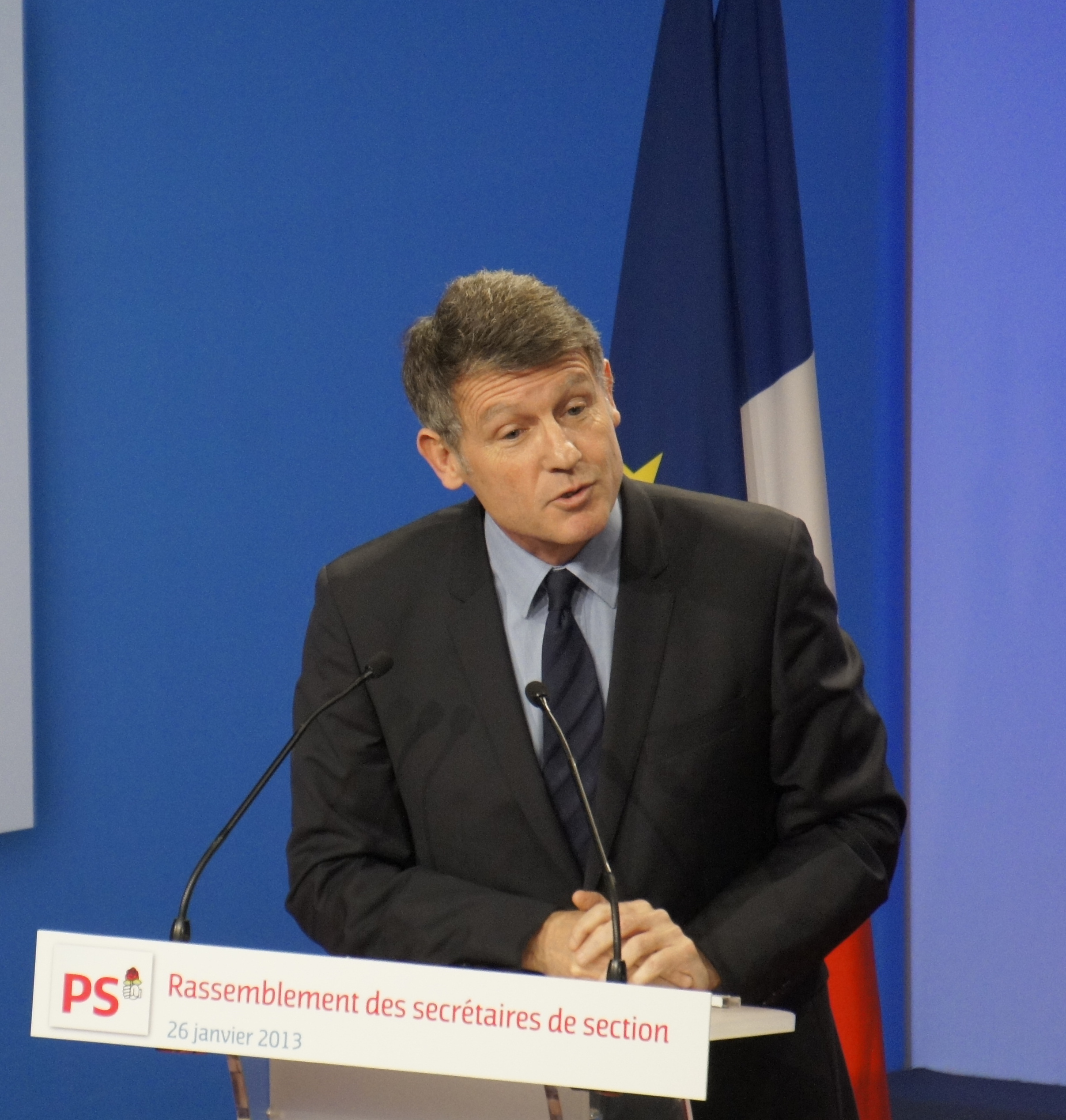
Vincent Peillon speaking at the Maison de la Mutualité in 2013

Valls, Montebourg, and Hamon ultimately became the main three contenders for the Socialist nomination, but several other candidates ultimately participated in the primary. Former Minister of National Education Vincent Peillon made a late bid to become the Socialist nominee, announcing his candidacy on 11 December, returning from a two-and-a-half-year residency in Switzerland in which he taught philosophy at the University of Neuchâtel and wrote novels; his bid contrasts with those of Montebourg and Hamon, representing the mainstream Socialist Party as opposed to its left-wing rebels. Three other candidates, not of the Socialist Party, also ran in the primary as members of the parties of la Belle Alliance Populaire, a left-wing grouping. Among these were MP François de Rugy, representing the Ecologist Party which he founded along with Senator Jean-Vincent Placé after leaving the EELV in August 2015 over concerns about the party pandering to its left wing; Sylvia Pinel of the Radical Party of the Left (PRG), and Jean-Luc Bennahmias, who left the Democratic Movement to found his own centre-left party, the Democratic Front.

Several other candidates also filed petitions to run in the primary, including Senator Marie-Noëlle Lienemann, Gérard Filoche, Fabien Verdier, and Pierre Larrouturou. Despite initially contemplating running, Lienemann decided not to run in the primary on 9 December, worried about the splitting of votes between candidates of the party's left wing – Montebourg and Hamon – and urging them to unite forces. Although she stated that she faced pressure to withdraw her candidacy, these pressures were not a factor in her recusal from the primary. Filoche, a trade unionist, failed to secure the necessary number of sponsors to enter the primary (though he attempted to lodge a challenge against the decision of the High Authority), as did Verdier. Both men claimed that, because they represented other left-wing parties (Parti politique Filoche2017 and Convictions, respectively), they were not bound by the requirement to seek sufficient support, as with Pinel, de Rugy, and Bennahmias; nevertheless, the decision to exclude both was reaffirmed. Larrouturou's application was rejected because his New Deal party was not a member of the left-wing alliance for the primary, as were those of Bastien Faudot of the Citizen and Republican Movement and Sébastien Nadot of the Movement of Progressives.

=== Campaign ===
Polling: Who was the most convincing candidate during this debate?
Debate	Poll source	Among all respondents			Among left-wing sympathizers		
Debate	Poll source	Valls	Montebourg	Hamon	Valls	Montebourg	Hamon
1	Elabe*	26%	29%	20%	28%	23%	27%
1	Odoxa**	27%	33%	20%	34%	25%	27%
1	Harris**†	29%	20%	22%	31%	17%	32%
2	Elabe*	26%	29%	25%	28%	24%	30%
2	Harris**†	23%	30%	26%	27%	24%	36%
3	Elabe*	21%	28%	29%	24%	23%	34%
3	OpinionWay*††	19%	20%	24%	25%	23%	32%
3	Harris**†	24%	26%	28%	25%	26%	34%
* conducted among viewers of the debate ** among those aware of the debate †excluding "none of these candidates" ††among those intending to vote in the primary as opposed to left-wing sympathizers

The unpopularity of incumbent president Hollande led to widespread speculation as to whether he would choose to run for re-election, facing fierce competition within his own party in the Socialist primary; when he ultimately renounced his candidacy on 1 December 2016, he cleared the way for prime minister Manuel Valls to enter the field on 5 December. Valls, considered the "natural successor" to Hollande and whose attempts to modernize the Socialist Party have been characterized as similar to those of Tony Blair with the British Labour Party, earned a reputation for his law-and-order approach as prime minister, instituting business-friendly supply-side reforms and taking a tough position on migration, at one point even questioning whether Islam was compatible with the French Republic; all these views placed him well to the right wing of his party. Valls' important role in Hollande's government resulted in him becoming similarly unpopular, even within his own party and on the left.

On 15 December, he declared that if elected president, he would abolish article 49-3, an executive degree enshrined within the Constitution of France. He controversially used it as prime minister to force laws through the National Assembly, bypassing legislative approval, to send them directly to the Senate, and his repudiation of the 49-3 was met with derision, Valls having used it to force through controversial labour reforms in the El Khomri law and the reformist Macron law, moves often described as indicative of his authoritarian tendencies. Valls further attempted to portray himself as a candidate "profoundly of the left" by backing down on his earlier tough tone towards labour, promising not to institute any further reforms to France's 35-hour workweek – beloved by the French left – nor its labour laws, instead taking an anti-austerity tone; despite this, his campaign was overshadowed by past policies such as the abolition of the wealth tax.

Unveiling his platform on 3 January 2017, he proposed a 2.5% increase in public spending contingent on annual economic growth of 1.9% while keeping the deficit below the 3% of GDP requirement mandated by the Stability and Growth Pact, the creation a "decent income" of €800 for all adult French nationals, halving the gender pay gap in France, a "pause" in the enlargement of the European Union, the addition of a charter of secularism to the Constitution, and the consolidation of the nuclear industry. Valls was physically attacked twice during the campaign; the first incident occurred on 22 December 2016, in which he was flour-bombed by a protester screaming "We do not forget the 49-3. We don't forgive it," a reference to his claim that he would abolish the constitutional provision he twice used to bypass legislative approval, during a visit to a Christmas market in Strasbourg. The second incident, on 17 January 2017, involved an apparent Breton nationalist who slapped him during a campaign stop in Lamballe; although Valls initially brushed the episode off, saying "it's nothing," he later made to press charges, saying "Democracy cannot be about violence."

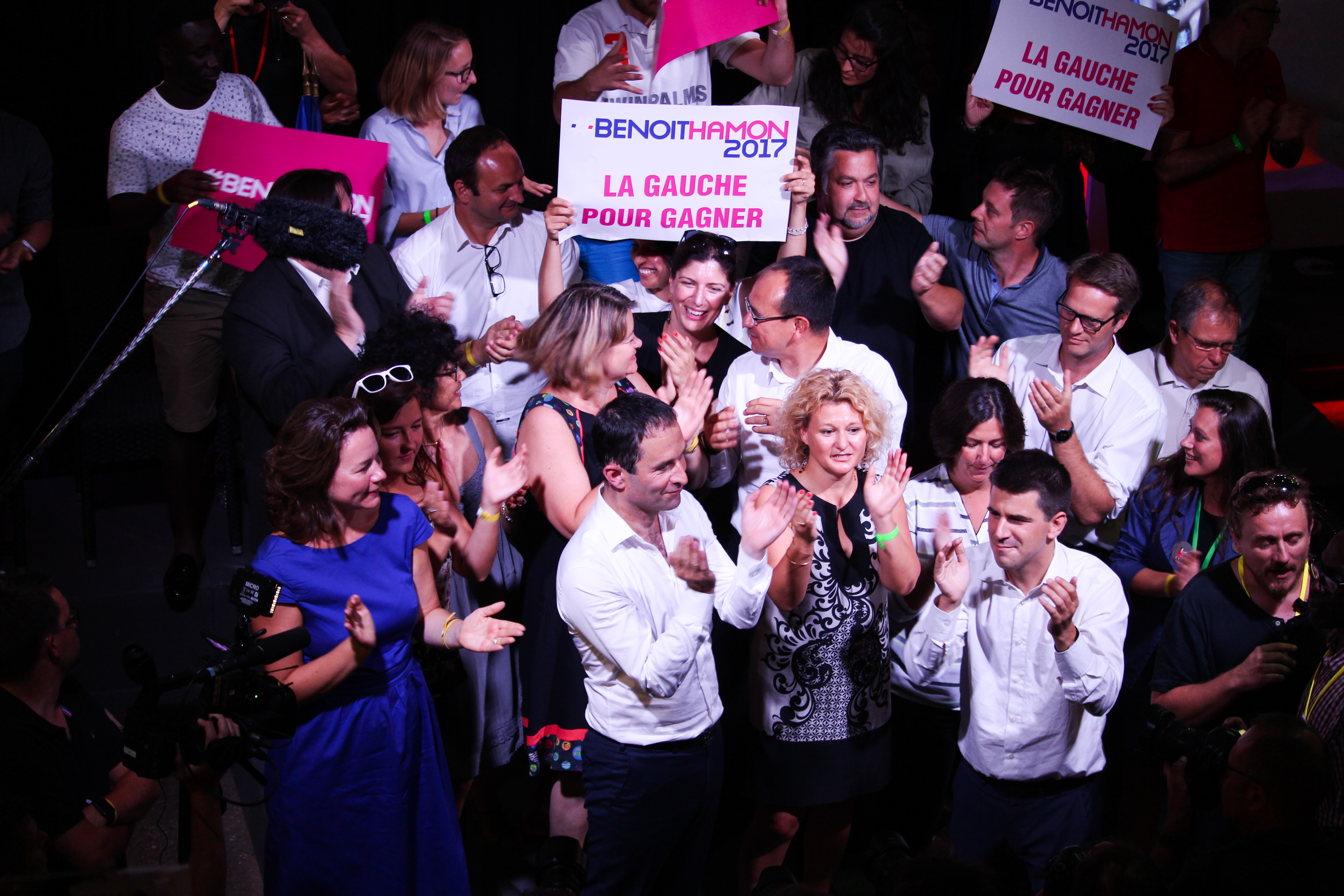
Benoît Hamon at a meeting of supporters in Saint-Denis

Valls' most prominent opponent was initially considered to be former economy minister Arnaud Montebourg, who formally unveiled his platform in Paris on 3 January. The left-wing firebrand proclaimed that French employees should receive wage rises equivalent to executives' in order to constrain corporate pay and called for a "supertax" on banks to raise €5 billion a year. Challenged by former education minister Benoît Hamon, who argued that the focus on economic growth and employment is misplaced, Montebourg argued that the prior was a "necessity" and claimed that he "challenged the theory of the end of work." He also criticized a perceived European obsession with austerity, condemning it as the cause of the country's persistently high rates of unemployment and dismal economic growth, promising to "liberate the French from European-imposed austerity." He also pledged during the campaign that he would not comply with EU deficit rules, in contrast to Valls, embark upon an "economic patriotism" (described as protectionism by some observers), reserve 80 percent of government contracts for French small businesses, reinstate border controls, repeal the El Khomri jobs bill, defend small domestic businesses, warn that he might engage in a trade war against China, and support a €30 billion infrastructure plan.

Montebourg's months-long position in second place, however, was challenged by a surge of support for Benoît Hamon, with the primary becoming a three-man race between Valls, Hamon, and Montebourg by mid-January. Hamon's strongly left-wing program of legalizing cannabis, taxing robots to fund a universal basic income, and reducing the 35-hour workweek to 32 hours, attracted many left-wing voters disillusioned by the Socialists' turn toward business-friendly policies, championed under Hollande's presidency by the likes of Valls and Macron. The former education minister's late rise was likened to that of François Fillon in the primary of the centre-right Republicans party, his rise propelled by his championing of left-wing values and vision of a society that spends less time working, enjoys higher pay, and emphasizes the importance GDP growth less. Hamon has also decried "neoconservatives" and "even those on the left" who wished to restrict the rights of French Muslims, a less-than-subtle denunciation of Valls's hardline stance on immigration. His proposal for a universal income has been his signature policy; in the final primary debate, he insisted that it "creates work" and "allows employees to reduce their workdays, and it can further contract and eradicate poverty," and post-debate polls indicated left-wing voters consistently viewed Hamon as being the most convincing candidate.

Three debates were held before the first round of the primary. The first, syndicated by TF1, Public Sénat, LCI, RTL, and co-organized by L'Observateur, aired at 21:00 CET on 12 January, moderated by Gilles Bouleau, Élizabeth Martichoux, and Matthieu Croissandeau; the second, by BFM TV, RMC, and I-TV, aired at 18:00 CET on 15 January, moderated by Ruth Elkrief, Laurence Ferrari, and Laurent Neumann; the third, by France 2, Europe 1, LCP, TV5Monde, and regional daily newspapers, aired at 21:00 CET on 19 January, moderated by David Pujadas, Léa Salamé, and Fabien Namias. The first debate attracted 3.83 million viewers, representing an audience share of 18.3%; the second 1.75 million, representing a share of 7.9%; and the third 3.07 million, a share of 15%.

=== First round ===
Numerical gain by candidate
Hamon	127,973
Valls	109,511
Montebourg	61,634
Peillon	24,103
de Rugy	13,603
Pinel	7,046
Bennahmias	3,563
Spoilt and null votes	4,580

Percentage gain by candidate
Hamon	28.18534009%
Valls	28.18068826%
Montebourg	28.15816525%
Peillon	28.16593631%
de Rugy	28.03528369%
Pinel	28.57606359%
Bennahmias	28.25759378%
Spoilt and null votes	28.21065599%

Hamon came on top in the first round of the primary, followed by Valls; as neither of the two secured more than 50% of the vote, a second round was held on 29 January. Montebourg, relegated to third place, conceded defeat and pledged to vote for Hamon in the second round. Peillon came fourth, de Rugy fifth, Pinel sixth, and Bennahmias last. Of these four candidates, Pinel backed Valls in the second round; Peillon did not endorse but encouraged voters to mobilize; and de Rugy also chose not to endorse immediately afterwards, hoping to meet the top two contenders on 23 January to decide. Only 7,350 polling stations were open during the primary, compared to 9,425 in the 2011 primary and 10,228 in the primary of the right. Meanwhile, Bennahmias, with just over 1% of the primary vote, did not initially endorse any candidate and expressed his intent to announce a decision on 25 January; he ultimately backed Valls.

An overnight update of the official primary results published 10:00 CET on 23 January added approximately three hundred thousand votes, without any change in the vote share of any candidate, arousing suspicions among observers and the French press. Two hours later, an update to the total of votes obtained by Sylvia Pinel was published, increasing her vote share by 0.01% (i.e., 160 additional votes). However, the total number of votes for Pinel increased by 161, more than the total number of overall votes, with changes to no other candidates. The results were initially speculated to have been manipulated into inflate the apparent turnout, which was low compared to past primaries. The PS initially attributed the results to a "bug", but later conceded that it had been a result of "human error." However, the French press remained skeptical, noting the improbability of a nearly-identical 28% increase in votes for all seven candidates. There was also additional confusion, even prior to reports about the potential manipulation of vote totals, surrounding the number of polling stations open (which, according to PS, is fewer than 7,350 because many were merged with others) and the vagueness of PS officials on primary turnout, compounded by the fact that no comprehensive public record of primary results was published.

=== Second round ===
The second round runoff was held on 29 January between Benoît Hamon and Manuel Valls. An additional debate was held before the second round, syndicated between France Inter, TF1, and France 2 at 21:00 CET on 25 January, moderated by Gilles Bouleau, David Pujadas, and Alexandra Bensaid, after which an Elabe poll found that 60% of viewers were most convinced by Hamon, compared to 37% for Valls; the margin was 61–36 among left-wing sympathizers. In the second round of the primary on 29 January, Hamon defeated Valls, by a comfortable margin, with 58.69% of votes against 41.31%; turnout, at 2.05 million, was considerably higher than that in the first round. As the winner of the primary, Hamon was designated the Socialist nominee for the presidential election.

=== Aftermath ===
On 22 February, François de Rugy announced his support for Emmanuel Macron, breaking the commitment requested of former candidates to back the winner of the primary, stating that he preferred "coherence to obedience," albeit acknowledging that Hamon was the legitimate nominee of the PS. On 13 March, Le Parisien reported that Valls, rather than backing Socialist nominee Benoît Hamon, would urge voters to support Macron in the first round of the presidential election; Valls denied the report at the time, but declared on 29 March that he personally would vote for Macron, but did not rally behind his candidacy. On 15 March, the PRG announced its support for Hamon's candidacy, securing concessions on issues pertaining to European governance, and confirmed an agreement with the Socialist Party for the legislative elections; this followed a period of hesitation after the primary in which the party contemplated the candidacy of Macron, who secured the support of several of its parliamentarians.

== Candidates ==
Candidate (name and age)		Political offices	Supporters
Jean-Luc Bennahmias (62)	Jean-Luc Bennahmias	President of the Democratic Front (since 2014) Other offices: MEP from 2004 to 2014	Pauline Delpech, François-Michel Lambert, Sanseverino
Benoît Hamon (49)	Benoît Hamon	MP for Yvelines (2012 and since 2014) Other offices: Minister of National Education, Higher Education and Research in 2014; Junior Minister of the Minister of the Economy and Finance, responsible for Consumer Affairs and the Social and Solidarity Economy from 2012 to 2014; Junior Minister of the Minister of the Economy, Finance, and Foreign Trade, responsible for Social and Solidarity Economy in 2012; MEP from 2004 to 2009	Support Sylviane Alaux, Alexis Bachelay, Guillaume Balas, Nathalie Chabanne, Pascal Cherki, Pierre Cohen, Florence Delaunay, Laurence Dumont, Henri Emmanuelli, Hervé Féron, Jean-Pierre Godefroy, Linda Gourjade, Mathieu Hanotin, Chaynesse Khirouni, Serge Janquin, Romain Joron, Régis Juanico, Georges Labazée, Jean-René Marsac, Édouard Martin, Philippe Martin, Michel Pouzol, Marie-Line Reynaud, Denys Robiliard, Barbara Romagnan, Gérard Sebaoun, Isabelle Thomas, Michel Vergnier, Michèle Rivasi
Arnaud Montebourg (54)	Arnaud Montebourg	Minister of the Economy, Production Recovery and the Digital Sector (2012–2014) Other offices: Minister of Productive Recovery from 2012 to 2014; President of the Departmental Council of Saône-et-Loire from 2008 to 2012; MP for Saône-et-Loire from 1997 to 2012	Support Laurent Baumel, Philippe Baumel, Jean-Pierre Blazy, Kheira Bouziane-Laroussi, Henri Cabanel, Laurent Cathala, Jérôme Durain, Aurélie Filippetti, Yann Galut, Daniel Goldberg, Jérôme Guedj, Édith Gueugneau, François Kalfon, Patrick Lebreton, Catherine Lemorton, Christophe Léonard, Michel Lesage, Bernard Lesterlin, Emmanuel Maurel, Pierre-Alain Muet, Philippe Noguès, Christian Paul, Patrice Prat, Christophe Premat, Cécile Untermaier
Vincent Peillon (56)	Vincent Peillon	MEP (2004–12 and since 2014) Other offices: Minister of National Education from 2012 to 2014; MP for the Somme from 1997 to 2002	Support Éric Andrieu, Kader Arif, David Assouline, Catherine Baratti-Elbaz, Jacques Bascou, Pervenche Berès, Karine Berger, Patrick Bloche, Marie-Odile Bouillé, Colette Capdevielle, Marie-Arlette Carlotti, Hélène Conway-Mouret, Valérie Corre, Karine Daniel, Sébastien Denaja, Jean-Paul Denanot, Sandrine Doucet, Rémi Féraud, Christophe Girard, Sylvie Guillaume, Philippe Grosvalet, Anne Hidalgo, Bruno Julliard, Didier Le Bret, Jean-Yves Leconte, Claudine Lepage, Lucette Lousteau, Jacques-Bernard Magner, Martine Martinel, Patrick Mennucci, Philippe Naillet, Philippe Nauche, Alain Néri, Gilles Pargneaux, George Pau-Langevin, Mazarine Pingeot, Élisabeth Pochon, Christine Revault d'Allonnes-Bonnefoy, Valérie Rabault, Marie Récalde, Eduardo Rihan Cypel, Claude Roiron, Isabelle This Saint-Jean, Alain Vidalies, Jean-Jacques Vlody
Sylvia Pinel (39)	Sylvia Pinel	President of the Radical Party of the Left (since 2016); MP for Tarn-et-Garonne (2007–2012 and since 2016) Other offices: Minister of Housing, Regional Equality and Rural Affairs from 2014 to 2016; Minister of Housing and Regional Equality in 2014; Minister of Crafts, Trade, and Tourism from 2012 to 2014; Junior Minister of Productive Recovery, responsible for Crafts, Trade, and Tourism in 2012	Jean-Michel Baylet, Thierry Braillard, Jeanine Dubié, Paul Giacobbi, Annick Girardin, Françoise Laborde, Dominique Orliac, Virginie Rozière, Jean-Claude Requier, Raymond Vall, Jean Zuccarelli.
François de Rugy (43)	François de Rugy	President of the Ecologist Party (since 2015); MP for Loire-Atlantique (since 2007) Other offices: Co-president of the Green group in the National Assembly from 2012 to 2015 and 2016	Éric Alauzet, Aline Archimbaud, Christophe Cavard, Emmanuelle Cosse, Véronique Massonneau, Barbara Pompili
Manuel Valls (54)	Manuel Valls	MP for Essonne (2002–12 and since 2017); Prime Minister of France (2014–16) Other offices: Interior Minister from 2012 to 2014; MP for Essonne from 2002 to 2012; Mayor of Évry from 2001 to 2012	Support Ibrahim Aboubacar, Patricia Adam, Michèle André, Alain Anziani, Nathalie Appéré, Pierre Aylagas, Audrey Azoulay, Dominique Baert, Guy Bailliart, Dominique Bailly, Gérard Bapt, Ericka Bareigts, Claude Bartolone, Christian Bataille, Delphine Bataille, Nicolas Bays, Catherine Beaubatie, Claude Bérit-Débat, Michel Berson, Chantal Berthelot, Alain Bertrand, Gisèle Biémouret, Yves Blein, Maryvonne Blondin, François Bonneau, Nicole Bonnefoy, Daniel Boisserie, Pascale Boistard, Yannick Botrel, Florent Boudié, Christophe Bouillon, Brigitte Bourguignon, Malek Boutih, Émeric Bréhier, Jean-Jacques Bridey, Jean-Claude Buisine, Sylviane Bulteau, Alain Calmette, Claire-Lise Campion, Thierry Carcenac, Christophe Caresche, Martine Carrillon-Couvreur, Françoise Cartron, Luc Carvounas, Jean-Yves Caullet, Guy Chambefort, Jacques Chiron, Jean-David Ciot, Alain Claeys, Karine Claireaux, Marie-Françoise Clergeau, Jacques Cornano, Jean-Jacques Cottel, Jacques Cresta, Pascale Crozon, Roland Courteau, Carlos Da Silva, Yves Daudigny, Pascal Deguilhem, Guy Delcourt, Michel Delebarre, Carole Delga, Jacques Dellerie, Pascal Demarthe, Françoise Descamps-Crosnier, Harlem Désir, Félix Desplan, Michel Destot, René Dosière, Philippe Doucet, Françoise Dumas, William Dumas, Jean-Louis Dumont, Jean-Paul Dupré, Yves Durand, Josette Durrieu, Olivier Dussopt, Vincent Eblé, Christian Eckert, Myriam El Khomri, Éric Elkouby, Sophie Errante, Martine Faure, Alain Fauré, Corinne Féret, Geneviève Fioraso, Hugues Fourage, Valérie Fourneyron, Michel Françaix, Christian Franqueville, Jean-Claude Fruteau, Jean-Louis Gagnaire, Catherine Génisson, Dominique Gillot, Éliane Giraud, Jean Glavany, Yves Goasdoué, Marc Goua, Laurent Grandguillaume, Élisabeth Guigou, Didier Guillaume, David Habib, Claude Haut, Odette Herviaux, Joëlle Huillier, Monique Iborra, Françoise Imbert, Michel Issindou, Éric Jeansannetas, Patrick Kanner, Antoine Karam, Marietta Karamanli, Bernadette Laclais, Bernard Lalande, Jack Lang, Jean-Yves Le Bouillonnec, Gilbert Le Bris, Anne-Yvonne Le Dain, Jean-Yves Le Déaut, Jean-Yves Le Drian, Jean-Marie Le Guen, Marie-Thérèse Le Roy, Bruno Le Roux, Marie Le Vern, Dominique Lefebvre, Patrick Lemasle, Cindy Léoni, Jean-Claude Leroy, Serge Letchimy, Michel Liebgott, François Loncle, Jeanny Lorgeoux, Gabrielle Louis-Carabin, Jean-Jacques Lozach, Victorin Lurel, Roger Madec, Philippe Madrelle, Hermeline Malherbe, Christian Manable, François Marc, Jean-Pierre Masseret, Rachel Mazuir, Juliette Méadel, Michel Ménard, Kléber Mesquida, Danielle Michel, Ségolène Neuville, Nathalie Nieson, Robert Olive, Michel Pajon, Georges Patient, Rémi Pauvros, Germinal Peiro, Daniel Percheron, Marie-Françoise Pérol-Dumont, Sébastien Pietrasanta, Jean-Vincent Placé, Napole Polutele, Pascal Popelin, Dominique Potier, Joaquim Pueyo, François Pupponi, Dominique Raimbourg, Daniel Raoul, Claude Raynal, Daniel Reiner, Pierre Ribeaud, Alain Richard, Stéphanie Riocreux, Sylvie Robert, Alain Rodet, Marcel Rogemont, Gilbert Roger, Laurence Rossignol, Gwendal Rouillard, René Rouquet, Alain Rousset, Jean-Yves Roux, Boinali Saïd, Michel Sapin, Odile Saugues, Gilbert Sauvan, Gilles Savary, Thani Mohamed Soilihi, Jean-Pierre Sueur, Simon Sutour, Catherine Tasca, Jean-Louis Tourenne, Stéphane Travert, Jean-Jacques Urvoas, René Vandierendonck, Daniel Vaillant, Jacques Valax, Najat Vallaud-Belkacem, Yannick Vaugrenard, Fabrice Verdier, Michel Vergoz, Patrick Vignal, Jean-Michel Villaumé, Évelyne Yonnet,

=== Withdrawn ===
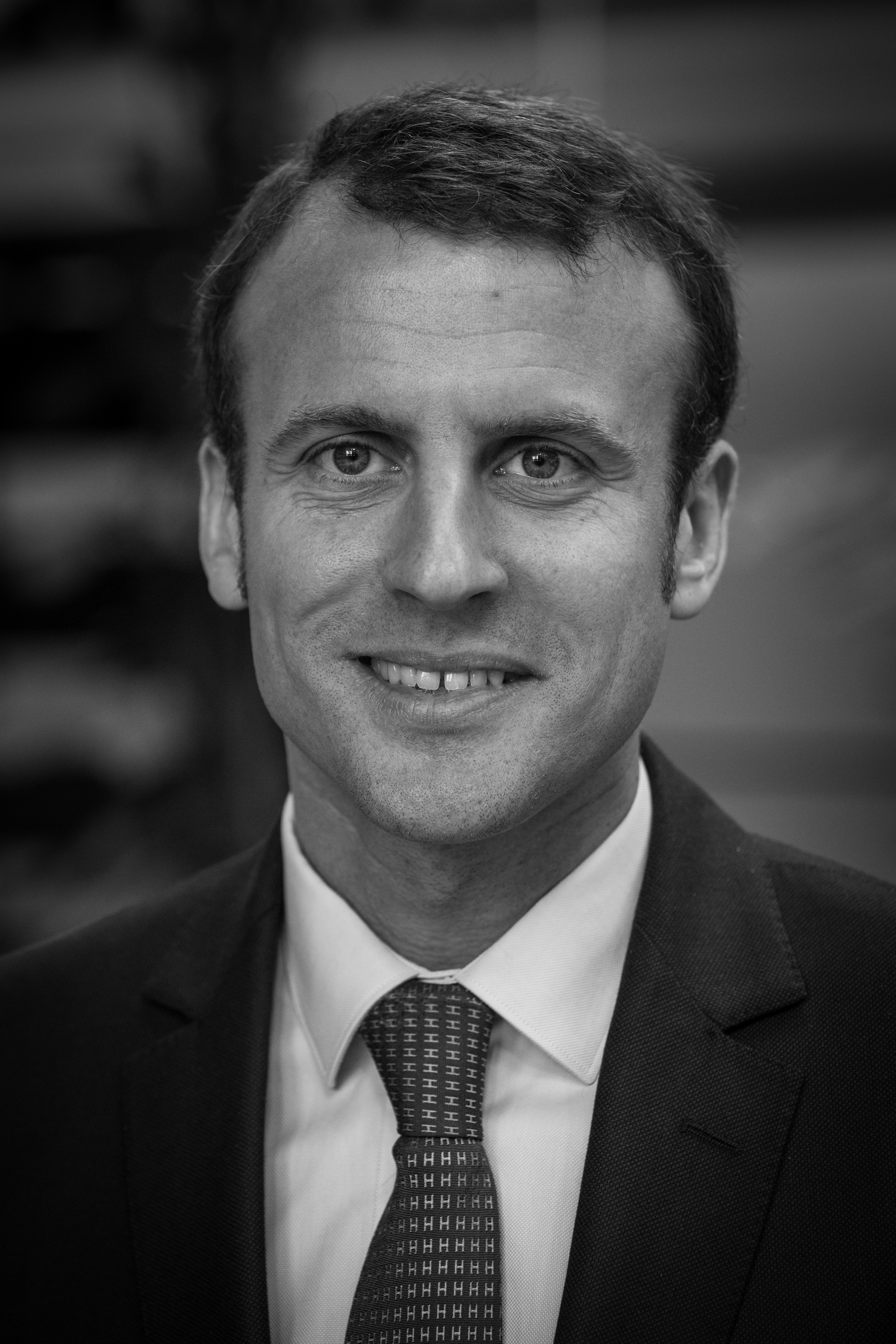
Former economy minister Emmanuel Macron, who refused to participate in the Socialist primary and instead ran for president as an independent under the banner of En Marche!

- Marie-Noëlle Lienemann, Senator
- Marc Jutier, PS member; joined Jean-Luc Mélenchon's La France Insoumise

=== Declined ===
- Martine Aubry, mayor of Lille, former Minister of Social Affairs, Minister of Labour, Employment and Vocational Training, Socialist leader, and 2012 presidential candidate
- Matthias Fekl, Trade Secretary in the Ministry of Foreign Affairs and International Development
- Annick Girardin, PRG member and Minister of the Civil Service; endorsed the candidacy of Sylvia Pinel
- Anne Hidalgo, mayor of Paris; endorsed the candidacy of Vincent Peillon
- François Hollande, incumbent President of France
- Ségolène Royal, 2007 Socialist Party presidential candidate, incumbent Minister of Ecology, Sustainable Development and Energy
- Christiane Taubira, former Minister of Justice
- Marisol Touraine, Minister of Social Affairs and Health
- Najat Vallaud-Belkacem, Minister of Education, Higher Education and Research; endorsed the candidacy of Manuel Valls

=== Refused to participate ===
- Emmanuel Macron, former Minister of the Economy, Industry and Digital Affairs, and founder of En Marche!, standing as an independent in the presidential election
- Jean-Luc Mélenchon, Left Front MEP, former Minister of Vocational Education and Senator, standing as a far-left candidate in the presidential election

== Opinion polls ==
=== First round ===
Polling firm	Fieldwork date	Sample size	Turnout	Hamon PS	Valls PS	Hollande PS	Montebourg PS	Peillon PS	de Rugy PE	Pinel PRG	Bennahmias FD	Filoche PS	Lienemann PS	Larrouturou ND	Macron EM	Aubry PS	Royal PS	Taubira PRG
2017 primary	22 Jan 2017	–	1,655,919	36.03%	31.48%	–	17.52%	6.81%	3.83%	2.00%	1.02%	–	–	–	–	–	–	–
OpinionWay	16–18 Jan 2017	536	2,000,000	28%	37%	–	24%	5%	1%	3%	2%	–	–	–	–	–	–	–
BVA	13–16 Jan 2017	536	2,250,000	27%	34%	–	26%	7%	2%	3%	1%	–	–	–	–	–	–	–
OpinionWay	9–11 Jan 2017	453	1,900,000	29%	40%	–	21%	7%	1%	1%	1%	–	–	–	–	–	–	–
Kantar Sofres	3–6 Jan 2017	488	2,600,000	21%	36%	–	23%	10%	2%	6%	2%	–	–	–	–	–	–	–
Harris Interactive	2–4 Jan 2017	478	–	22%	43%	–	25%	7%	1%	2%	<0.5%	–	–	–	–	–	–	–
Harris Interactive	5–7 Dec 2016	541	–	11%	45%	–	28%	–	1%	–	1%	6%	5%	3%	–	–	–	–
BVA	3–13 Nov 2016	4% of 9,206	–	13%	44%	–	32%	–	1%	3.5%	1%	2.5%	3%	–	–	–	–	–
BVA	3–13 Nov 2016	4% of 9,206	–	13%	–	40%	34%	–	2%	3%	1%	3%	4%	–	–	–	–	–
BVA	3–13 Nov 2016	4% of 9,206	–	11%	34%	–	21%	–	1%	4%	1%	2%	2%	–	24%	–	–	–
BVA	3–13 Nov 2016	4% of 9,206	–	11%	–	27%	24%	–	1%	2%	2%	2%	3%	–	28%	–	–	–
BVA	13–20 Sep 2016	4% of 9,255	–	14%	44%	–	31%	–	1.5%	1%	2%	4%	2.5%	–	–	–	–	–
BVA	13–20 Sep 2016	4% of 9,255	–	14%	–	43%	33%	–	2%	1%	2%	3%	2%	–	–	–	–	–
Ipsos	9–18 Sep 2016	1,017	–	16%	41%	–	32%	–	1%	–	1%	5%	4%	–	–	–	–	–
Ipsos	9–18 Sep 2016	1,017	–	16%	–	43%	31%	–	1%	–	1%	4%	4%	–	–	–	–	–
Ipsos	1–4 Jul 2016	993	–	13%	35%	–	32%	–	11%	2%	–	–	7%	–	–	–	–	–
Ipsos	1–4 Jul 2016	993	–	13%	–	37%	32%	–	10%	2%	–	–	6%	–	–	–	–	–
Ipsos	1–4 Jul 2016	993	–	–	–	40%	38%	–	11%	3%	–	–	8%	–	–	–	–	–
Ipsos	1–4 Jul 2016	993	–	13%	–	–	30%	–	11%	2%	–	–	6%	–	38%	–	–	–
BVA	6–15 Oct 2015	1,012	–	4%	33%	22%	8%	–	–	–	–	–	–	–	–	10%	17%	6%

=== Second round ===
==== Hamon–Valls ====
Polling firm	Fieldwork date	Sample size	Hamon PS	Valls PS
2017 primary	29 Jan 2017	–	58.69%	41.31%
OpinionWay	16–18 Jan 2017	536	49%	51%
BVA	13–16 Jan 2017	536	52%	48%
OpinionWay	9–11 Jan 2017	453	47%	53%
Kantar Sofres	3–6 Jan 2017	488	50%	50%
Harris Interactive	2–4 Jan 2017	478	43%	57%

==== Valls–Montebourg ====
Polling firm	Fieldwork date	Sample size	Valls PS	Montebourg PS
OpinionWay	16–18 Jan 2017	536	51%	49%
BVA	13–16 Jan 2017	536	48%	52%
OpinionWay	9–11 Jan 2017	453	54%	46%
Kantar Sofres	3–6 Jan 2017	488	47%	53%
Harris Interactive	2–4 Jan 2017	478	55%	45%
Harris Interactive	5–7 Dec 2016	541	51%	49%
BVA	3–13 Nov 2016	4% of 9,206	57%	43%
BVA	13–20 Sep 2016	4% of 9,255	51%	49%
Ipsos	9–18 Sep 2016	1,017	49%	51%
Ipsos	1–4 Jul 2016	993	46%	54%

==== Hollande–Montebourg ====
Polling firm	Fieldwork date	Sample size	Hollande PS	Montebourg PS
BVA	3–13 Nov 2016	4% of 9,206	48%	52%
BVA	13–20 Sep 2016	4% of 9,255	48%	52%
Ipsos	9–18 Sep 2016	1,017	50%	50%
Ipsos	1–4 Jul 2016	993	47%	53%

==== Hollande–Hamon ====
Polling firm	Fieldwork date	Sample size	Hollande PS	Hamon PS
Ipsos	1–4 Jul 2016	993	57%	43%

==== Valls–Macron ====
Polling firm	Fieldwork date	Sample size	Valls PS	Macron EM
BVA	3–13 Nov 2016	4% of 9,206	58%	42%

==== Montebourg–Macron ====
Polling firm	Fieldwork date	Sample size	Montebourg PS	Macron EM
Ipsos	1–4 Jul 2016	993	51%	49%

==== Hollande–Macron ====
Polling firm	Fieldwork date	Sample size	Hollande PS	Macron EM
BVA	3–13 Nov 2016	4% of 9,206	50.5%	49.5%

== Results ==
Summary of the Socialist Party 22 and 29 January 2017 presidential primary
Candidates	Parties		1st round		2nd round	
Candidates	Parties		Votes	%	Votes	%
Benoît Hamon	Socialist Party	PS	596,647	36.03	1,181,872	58.69
Manuel Valls	Socialist Party	PS	521,238	31.48	831,871	41.31
Arnaud Montebourg	Socialist Party	PS	290,070	17.52		
Vincent Peillon	Socialist Party	PS	112,718	6.81		
François de Rugy	Ecologist Party	PÉ	63,430	3.83		
Sylvia Pinel	Radical Party of the Left	PRG	33,067	2.00		
Jean-Luc Bennahmias	Democratic Front	FD	16,869	1.02		
Valid votes			1,634,039	98.68	2,013,743	98.46
Spoilt and null votes			21,880	1.32	31,600	1.54
Total			1,655,919	100%	2,045,343	100%
List of candidates by High Authority. Source: Archived 2012-04-07 at the Wayback Machine Archived 2017-04-02 at the Wayback Machine

== Non-candidates ==
Twenty-four applications were filed with the High Authority for the left-wing primary, but not all were made public; of these, several were disqualified for not securing enough sponsors under the rules of the primary.

- Gérard Filoche, former labor inspector, militant communist
- Sidi Hamada-Hamidou, member of the Radical Party of the Left (PRG)
- Maxime Legrand, opposition councillor in Poissy
- Régis Passerieux, candidate of the PS's Christian faction
- Fabien Verdier, Socialist Party member, advisor to two cabinet ministers and former town councillor

Several other individuals filed applications which were rejected as they were not members of PS, UDE, PE, or FD.

- Bastien Faudot, spokesman of the Citizen and Republican Movement (MRC)
- Pierre Larrouturou, former co-president of Nouvelle Donne
- Sébastien Nadot, nominee of the Movement of Progressives

== See also ==
- The Republicans (France) presidential primary, 2016
- 2017 French presidential election
