= Desplan =

Desplan is a surname. Notable people with the surname include:

- Claude Desplan, French biologist
- Félix Desplan (born 1943), French politician
