= François Kalfon =

French politician (born 1968)

François Kalfon MEP
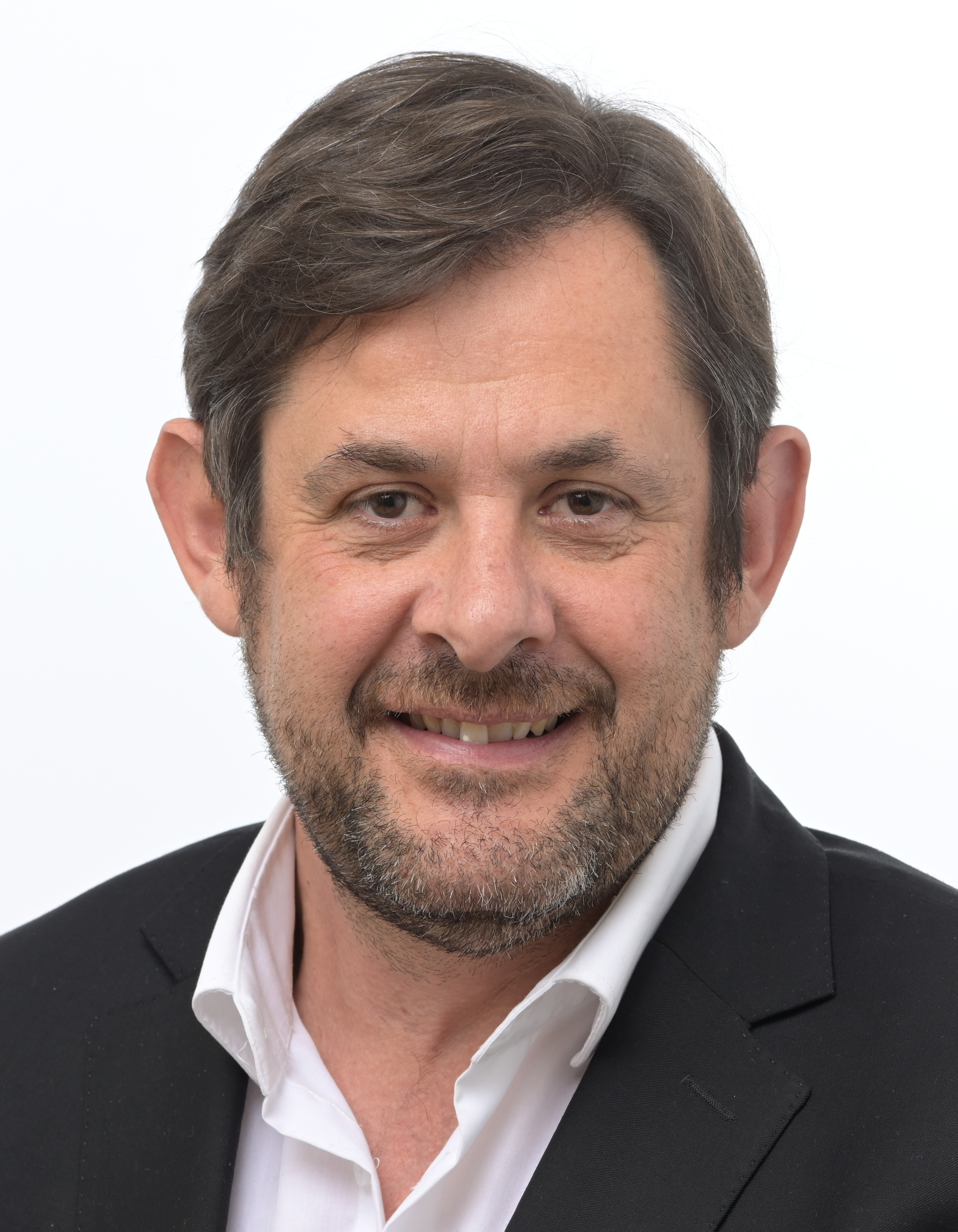
- Portrait of François Kalfon

Member of the European Parliament for France
- Incumbent
- Assumed office 16 July 2024

Personal details
- Born: 11 June 1968 (age 57) Sarcelles, France
- Party: Socialist Party
- Other political affiliations: Party of European Socialists

François Kalfon (born 11 June 1968) is a French politician of the Socialist Party who was elected member of the European Parliament in 2024.

== Early life and career ==
Kalfon was born in Sarcelles in 1968. He was elected to the Regional Council of Île-de-France in 2004, and was re-elected in 2010 and 2015. Until 2015 he was the Socialist Party's national secretary for work and employment, and he was also a co-founder of La Gauche populaire and administrator of Île-de-France Mobilités. During the 2011 Socialist Party presidential primary he worked on the campaign of Dominique Strauss-Kahn, and during the 2017 presidential primary he was the campaign director of Arnaud Montebourg.
