= Eure-et-Loir's 4th constituency =

Constituency of the National Assembly of France

4th constituency of Eure-et-Loir
- inline Constituency of the National Assembly of France

- Constituency in department

- Eure-et-Loir in France
- Deputy: Philippe Vigier; MoDem
- Department: Eure-et-Loir
- Cantons: Auneau, Bonneval, Brou, Châteaudun, Cloyes-sur-le-Loir, Janville, Orgères-en-Beauce, Voves

The 4th constituency of Eure-et-Loir is a French legislative constituency in the Eure-et-Loir département. It has been held since 2007 by Philippe Vigier, who won the 2007 and 2012 elections in the first round.

== Assembly Members ==
Election	Member	Party
1988	Maurice Dousset	UDF
1993	Maurice Dousset	UDF
1997	Marie-Hélène Aubert	EELV
2002	Alain Venot	UMP
2007	Philippe Vigier	NC
2012	Philippe Vigier	NC
2017	Philippe Vigier	UDI
2020	Philippe Vigier	MoDem
2022	Philippe Vigier	MoDem
2024	Philippe Vigier	MoDem

== Election results ==
=== 2024 ===
Candidate	Party	Alliance	First round			Second round		
Candidate	Party	Alliance	Votes	%	+/–	Votes	%	+/–
Emma Minot	LR-RN	UXD	18,854	43.15	new	21,025	48.26	new
Philippe Vigier	MoDEM	Ensemble	17,236	39.44	-3.22	22,542	51.74	-8.42
Sylviane Boëns	PS	NFP	6,243	14.29	-1.13			
Vincent Lhopiteau	REC		817	1.87	-3.23			
Anne-Laure Assayag	LO		548	1.25	-0.08			
Votes			43,698	100.00		43,567	100.00	
Valid votes			43,698	97.55	-0.56	43,567	96.50	+3.04
Blank votes			823	1.84	+0.48	1,130	2.50	-2.47
Null votes			275	0.61	+0.07	449	0.99	-0.57
Turnout			44,796	66.51	+16.59	45,146	67.02	+20.28
Abstentions			22,221	32.98	-16.59	22,555	33.49	-20.28
Registered voters			67,351			67,367		
Result			MoDEM HOLD					

=== 2022 ===
Legislative Election 2022: Eure-et-Loir's 4th constituency
Party	Candidate	Votes	%	±%
MoDem (Ensemble)	Philippe Vigier	14,050	42.66	+22.23
RN	Virginia de Oliveira	8,072	24.51	+8.02
LFI (NUPÉS)	Mathieu Gaston	5,079	15.42	+6.03
LR (UDC)	Elisabeth Meyblum	2,468	7.49	−35.23
REC	Vincent Lhopiteau	1,679	5.10	N/A
DVE	Evelyne Dassas	715	2.17	N/A
Others	N/A	870	-	−
Turnout		32,933	49.92	−3.59
2nd round result
MoDem (Ensemble)	Philippe Vigier	17,671	60.16	+30.54
RN	Virginia de Oliveira	11,702	39.84	N/A
Turnout		29,373	46.74	−0.45
MoDem gain from UDI				

=== 2017 ===
Candidate	Label	First round		Second round	
Candidate	Label	Votes	%	Votes	%
Philippe Vigier	UDI	15,064	42.72	20,685	70.38
Clémence Rouvier	REM	7,206	20.43	8,705	29.62
Vincent Collo	FN	5,814	16.49		
Fabien Verdier	DVG	2,601	7.38		
Sophie Sinatti	FI	2,099	5.95		
Nachida Barre	ECO	647	1.83		
Dominique Garcia	PCF	567	1.61		
Damien Villette	DVD	543	1.54		
Florence Bernard	DLF	304	0.86		
Anne-Laure Assayag	EXG	243	0.69		
Florian Tessier	DIV	177	0.50		
Votes		35,265	100.00	29,390	100.00
Valid votes		35,265	98.06	29,390	92.66
Blank votes		503	1.40	1,636	5.16
Null votes		194	0.54	692	2.18
Turnout		35,962	53.51	31,718	47.19
Abstentions		31,247	46.49	35,490	52.81
Registered voters		67,209		67,208	
Source: Ministry of the Interior

=== 2012 ===
Philippe Vigier won the constituency in the first round

2012 legislative election in Eure-Et-Loir's 4th constituency
Candidate	Party	First round	
Candidate	Party	Votes	%
Philippe Vigier	NC	20,603	50.72%
Karim Laanaya	EELV	9,504	23.40%
Guylaine Bercher	FN	6,271	15.44%
Dominique Garcia	FG	2,392	5.89%
Christian Baeckeroot	UDN	324	0.80%
Danielle Rousseau	DLR	323	0.80%
Marc Governatori	AEI	313	0.77%
Anne-Laure Lucas	PCD	249	0.61%
Anne-Laure Assayag	LO	241	0.59%
Manuel Georget	NPA	221	0.54%
Catherine Marceaux	DVD (UPF)	179	0.44%
Valid votes		40,620	98.17%
Spoilt and null votes		759	1.83%
Votes cast / turnout		41,379	61.57%
Abstentions		25,827	38.43%
Registered voters		67,206	100.00%

=== 2007 ===
Legislative Election 2007: Eure-et-Loir 4th
Party	Candidate	Votes	%	±%
NM	Philippe Vigier	23,918	57.12	N/A
PS	Serge Fauve	9,467	22.61	N/A
FN	Marie-France Garcette	2,342	5.59	−7.88
PCF	Dominique Garcia	1,356	3.24	+0.67
LV	Danielle Auroi	1,298	3.10	−21.10
LCR	Alice Bouyssou	1,096	2.62	N/A
MPF	Bernadette Joachim	964	2.30	+0.62
CPNT	Jessica Guillet-Briand	879	2.10	−0.77
LO	Miren Chaize	554	1.32	−0.72
Turnout		42,890	63.16	−3.94
NM gain from UMP				

=== 2002 ===
Legislative Election 2002: Eure-et-Loir's 4th constituency
Party	Candidate	Votes	%	±%
UMP	Alain Venot	11,042	25.72	N/A
UDF	Philippe Vigier*	10,783	25.11	+2.52
LV	Marie-Hélène Aubert	10,391	24.20	+1.11
FN	Agnès Biondi-Blancot	5,782	13.47	−3.49
CPNT	François Care	1,233	2.87	N/A
PCF	Jean-Pierre Le Touzo	1,105	2.57	−6.01
LO	Miren Chaize	875	2.04	N/A
Others	N/A	1,724	-	−
Turnout		44,037	67.10	−4.43
2nd round result
UMP	Alain Venot	22,872	58.49	N/A
LV	Marie-Hélène Aubert	16,232	41.51	−10.96
Turnout		41,200	62.78	−11.61
UMP gain from LV				

* Withdrew before the 2nd round

=== 1997 ===
Legislative Election 1997: Eure-et-Loir's 4th constituency
Party	Candidate	Votes	%	±%
LV	Marie-Hélène Aubert	9,906	23.09	
PR (UDF)	Maurice Dousset	9,692	22.59	
FN	Marie-Renée Maissen	7,274	16.96	
DVD	Joel Billard	6,155	14.35	
PCF	Jean-René Hardy	3,682	8.58	
LDI	Vincent Lhopiteau	2,621	6.11	
GE	Christiane Meyer	2,081	4.85	
LDI	Joseph Hudault*	1,489	3.47	
Turnout		45,624	71.53	
2nd round result
LV	Marie-Hélène Aubert	22,977	52.47	
PR (UDF)	Maurice Dousset	20,817	47.53	
Turnout		47,447	74.39	
LV gain from PR				

* LDI dissident

== Sources ==
- Official results of French elections from 1998: "Résultats électoraux officiels en France" (in French). Archived from the original on 20 December 2011.
