= Belkhir Belhaddad =

French politician

Member of the National Assembly for Moselle's 1st constituency
- Incumbent
- Assumed office 21 June 2017
- Preceded by: Aurélie Filippetti

Personal details
- Born: 9 July 1969 (age 57) Timgad, Algeria
- Party: La République En Marche! Territories of Progress
- Education: University of Metz

Belkhir Belhaddad (born 9 July 1969) is a French entrepreneur and politician representing La République En Marche! (LREM) and Territories of Progress (TDP) who has been serving as a member of the French National Assembly since the 2017 elections, representing the department of Moselle.

== Early life ==
Belhaddad was born in Algeria and moved to France when his parents settled there to work in the steel industry.

== Political career ==
Having previously been active in the Socialist Party, Belhaddad joined LREM in 2016. In parliament, Belhaddad serves as member of the Committee on Social Affairs. In addition to his committee assignments, he is a member of the French-Algerian Parliamentary Friendship Group.

In July 2019, Belhaddad voted in favour of the French ratification of the European Union’s Comprehensive Economic and Trade Agreement (CETA) with Canada.

In October 2023, Belhaddad filed a complaint with the public prosecutor against Laurent Jacobelli for "insulting and defaming a member of parliament".

== Other activities ==
- French Reserve Fund, Member of the Supervisory Board

== See also ==
- 2017 French legislative election
