= Moselle's 1st constituency =

Constituency of the National Assembly of France

1st constituency of Moselle
- inline Constituency of the National Assembly of France

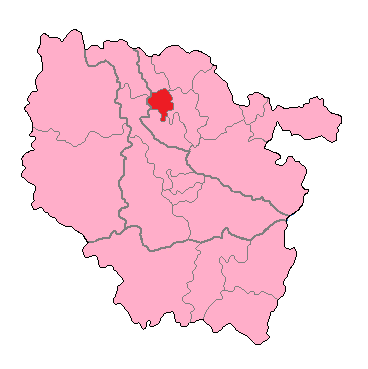
- Moselle's 1st Constituency shown within Lorraine
- Deputy: Belkhir Belhaddad; RE
- Department: Moselle
- Cantons: Maizières-lès-Metz, Marange-Silvange, Metz III (part), Woippy, Rombas-Amnéville.
- Registered voters: 88,219

The 1st constituency of Moselle is a French legislative constituency in the Moselle département.

== Description ==
The 1st Constituency of Moselle includes a small part of the city of Metz as well as the towns to its north such as Maizières-lès-Metz and Woippy.

Since 1988 the seat has swung between the major parties of left and right. In 2012 Gérard Terrier replaced Aurélie Filippetti following her appointment to the government as Minister of Culture a position which she held under the premiership of both Jean-Marc Ayrault and Manuel Valls.

== Historic Representation ==
Election	Member	Party
1986	Proportional representation – no election by constituency	
1988	Jean Laurain	PS
1993	François Grosdidier	RPR
1997	Gérard Terrier	PS
2002	François Grosdidier	UMP
2007	François Grosdidier	UMP
2012	Aurélie Filippetti	PS
2012	Gérard Terrier	PS
2017	Belkhir Belhaddad	LREM
2022	Belkhir Belhaddad	RE

== Election results ==
=== 2024 ===
Legislative Election 2024: Moselle's 1st constituency
Party	Candidate	Votes	%	±%
LO	Didier Georget	745	1.31	N/A
RE (Ensemble)	Balkhir Belhaddad	15,640	27.59	+3.19
RN	Grégoire Laloux	22,750	39.81	+14.47
DIV	Américo Jonas Costa	618	1.09	N/A
NPA	Célia Lejal	202	0.36	N/A
DLF	Jean-François Jacques	1,027	1.81	N/A
DIV	Stephen Duso-Bauduin	1,094	1.93	N/A
LFI (NFP)	Vincent Felix	14,793	26.10	N/A
Turnout		56,689	96.83	+56.22
Registered electors		93,930		
2nd round result
RE	Belkhir Belhaddad	31,517	55.70	+28.11
RN	Grégoire Laloux	25,070	44.30	+4.49
Turnout		56,587	95.32	−1.51
Registered electors		93,956		
RE hold		Swing		

=== 2022 ===
Legislative Election 2022: Moselle's 1st constituency
Party	Candidate	Votes	%	±%
RN	Grégoire Laloux	9,385	25.37	+7.07
LREM (Ensemble)	Belkhir Belhaddad	9,023	24.40	-3.63
PS (NUPÉS)	Esther Leick	8,714	23.56	−0.23
LR (UDC)	Malou Kuntz	4,022	10.87	−0.77
REC	Rebecca Konarski	1,580	4.27	N/A
PS	Yoan Hadadi*	1,580	4.27	N/A
DVE	Camal Kadri	909	2.46	+1.15
Others	N/A	1,774	-	−
Turnout		36,987	40.61	−1.20
2nd round result
LREM (Ensemble)	Belkhir Belhaddad	17,532	53.59	-6.38
RN	Grégoire Laloux	15,184	46.41	+6.38
Turnout		32,716	38.49	+1.41
LREM hold				

=== 2017 ===
Candidate	Label	First round		Second round	
Candidate	Label	Votes	%	Votes	%
Belkhir Belhaddad	REM	10,493	28.03	18,098	59.97
Laurence Burg	FN	6,848	18.30	12,081	40.03
Aurélie Filippetti	PS	4,417	11.80		
Marie-Louise Kuntz	LR	4,358	11.64		
Narjès Chouikha	FI	3,901	10.42		
Marie Tribout	UDI	3,170	8.47		
Frédéric Navrot	DIV	1,060	2.83		
Pascal Schmitt	DIV	622	1.66		
Thomas Calligaro	PCF	589	1.57		
Béatrice Sieja	DIV	581	1.55		
Corinne Morgen	ECO	492	1.31		
Olivier Fath	REG	210	0.56		
Didier Georget	EXG	205	0.55		
René Sicuranza	DIV	178	0.48		
Calogero Gagliano	EXG	155	0.41		
Éric Graff	DVG	151	0.40		
Votes		37,430	100.00	30,179	100.00
Valid votes		37,430	97.90	30,179	89.00
Blank votes		623	1.63	2,850	8.41
Null votes		178	0.47	879	2.59
Turnout		38,231	41.81	33,908	37.08
Abstentions		53,208	58.19	57,531	62.92
Registered voters		91,439		91,439	
Source: Ministry of the Interior

=== 2012 ===
Legislative Election 2012: Moselle's 1st constituency
Party	Candidate	Votes	%	±%
PS	Aurélie Filippetti	20,190	43.58	
UMP	Julien Freyburger	11,876	25.64	
FN	Delphine Haffner	8,721	18.82	
FG	Patrick Abate	2,592	5.60	
MoDem	Christine Singer	1,021	2.20	
Others	N/A	1,927		
Turnout		46,327	52.51	
2nd round result
PS	Aurélie Filippetti	25,551	59.04	
UMP	Julien Freyburger	17,727	40.96	
Turnout		43,278	49.06	
PS gain from UMP				

== Sources ==
Official results of French elections from 2002: "Résultats électoraux officiels en France" (in French).
