= Élizabeth Martichoux =

- Born: 1961 (age 64–65); Seine-et-Marne, France
- Education: École supérieure de journalisme de Lille
- Occupation: Journalist
- Employer: LCI
- Spouse: Aquilino Morelle (divorced)
- Children: 4

Élizabeth Martichoux (born 1961) is a French radio political journalist.

== Early life ==
Élizabeth Martichoux was born in 1961 in Seine-et-Marne. She graduated from the École supérieure de journalisme in Lille.

== Career ==
Martichoux began her career as a radio journalist for France Inter in 1984. She worked Europe 1 from 1991 to 2006, when she joined RTL in 2001. She became RTL's political director in 2013. In September 2016, she succeeded Olivier Mazerolle as the political interviewer of the 7:50AM programme. During the 2017 French presidential campaign, she presented one of the primary debates for The Republicans.

Martichoux is the author of two books.

== Personal life ==
With her former husband, Socialist political advisor Aquilino Morelle, she has four children.

== Works ==
- Mangin, Catherine; Martichoux, Elizabeth (1991). Ces Femmes qui nous gouvernent. Paris: Michel. ISBN 9782226049094. OCLC 243714147.
- Martichoux, Elizabeth (2003). Les Journalistes. Paris: Cavalier bleu. ISBN 9782846700702. OCLC 300260493.
