= Fabien Verdier =

French politician (born 1981)

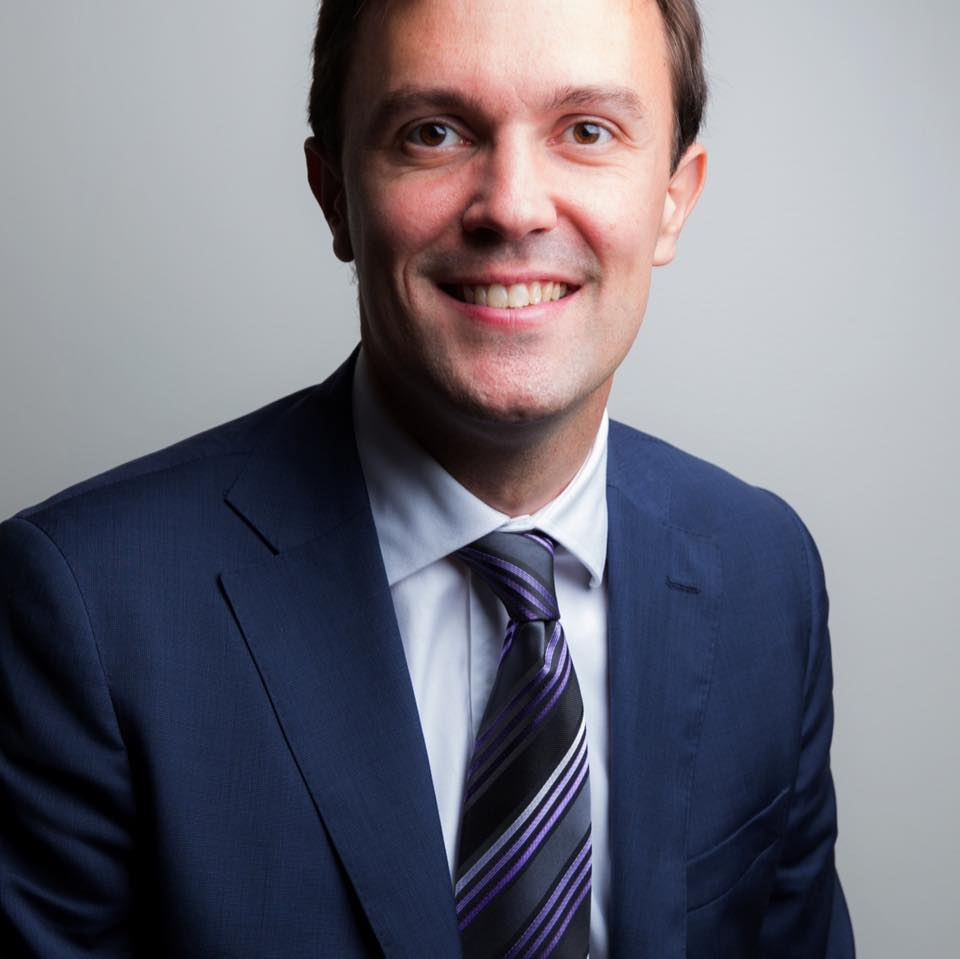
- Verdier in 2015

past Mayor of Châteaudun
- In office 3 July 2020 – march 2026
- Preceded by: Alain Venot
- Succeeded by: Philippe Vigier

Personal details
- Born: 16 April 1981 (age 45) Montelimar
- Party: No
- Other political affiliations: Miscellaneous left

Fabien Verdier (born 16 April 1981) is a French politician. He was elected (51%) at the second round as mayor of Châteaudun and afterwards as president of Grand Châteaudun on 2020 but lost (23,8%) in the first round on 2026.

From 2015 to 2021, he was a member of the Regional Council of Centre-Val de Loire. While François Bonnaud choose Harold Huwart as vice-president, Fabien Verdier votes against the regional council's budget.

In the 2017 legislative election, he was a candidate for the National Assembly in Eure-et-Loir's 4th constituency. In the 2017 Socialist Party presidential primary, he was a candidate for the Socialist Party nomination for the French presidential election. He failed to secure the required number of endorsements and was ordered by the court to pay damages for bringing a frivolous legal action.
