= Jacques Cornano =

French politician

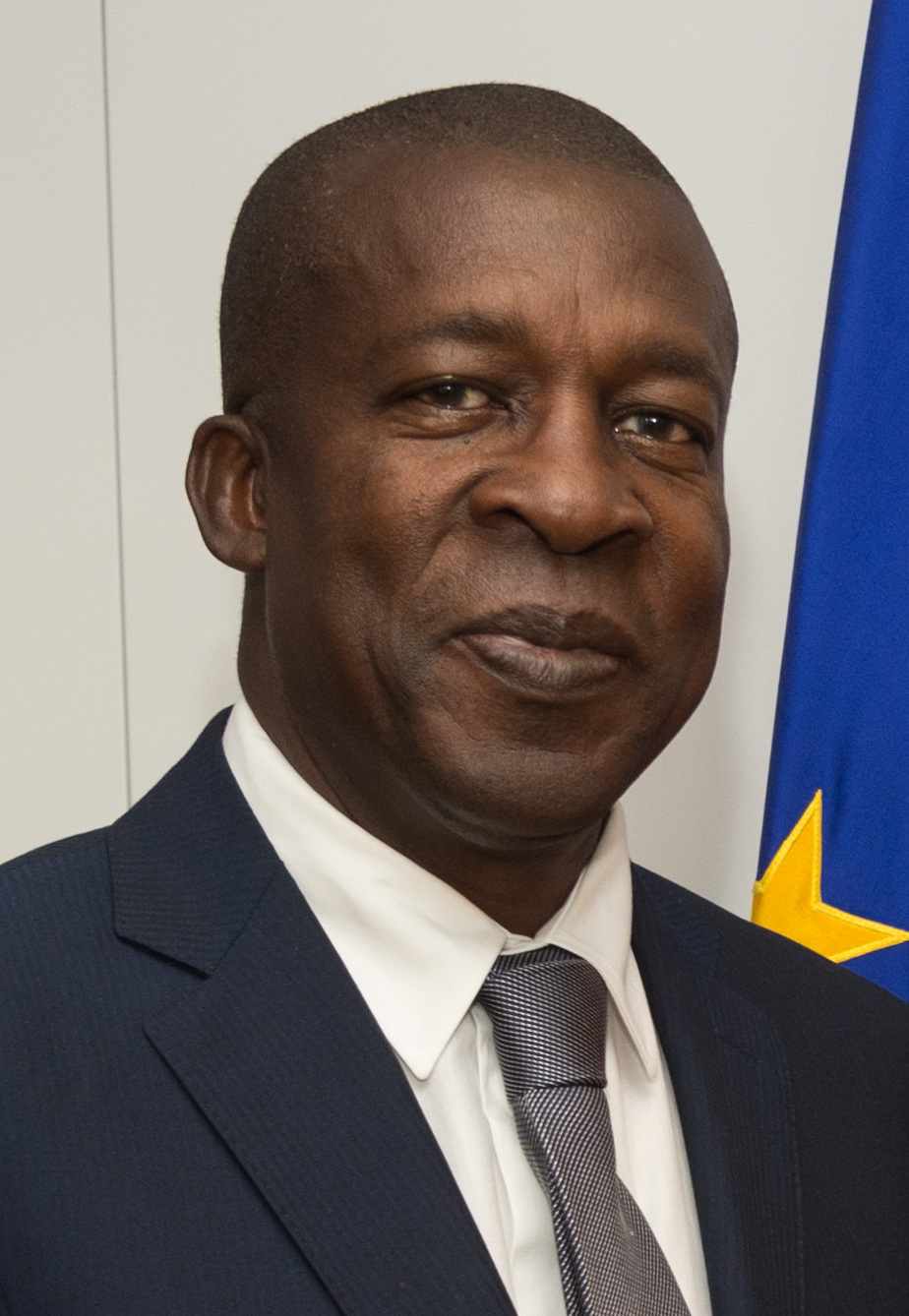
Jacques Cornano in 2015

Jacques Cornano (born 18 November 1956, in Saint-Louis, Guadeloupe) is a French politician who was elected to the French Senate on 25 September 2011, representing the Department of Guadeloupe.

== Professional career ==
Before taking up his political offices, Jacques Cornano used to work as a teacher. Professor of Electrical engineering, he used to teach in Guadeloupe (Basse-Terre and Grande-Terre) as well as in the École Normale Nationale de l’Apprentissage (ENNA) of Toulouse. Once back in Guadeloupe, he was elected president of Aigle, a cultural and sporting association. He also succeeded in opening an electro-technical class in the High School of Marie-Galante in 1978. This was also the time when the population of Saint-Louis de Marie-Galante (his hometown) asked him to return to his native island so he could run for the municipal elections.

== Political itinerary ==
=== Mayor of Saint-Louis de Marie-Galante ===
Even though Jacques Cornano was still a teacher in Capesterre-Belle-Eau, the inhabitants of Saint-Louis asked him to run for the municipal elections and to present an opposition list against the outgoing mayor, François PAMÉOLE. Since then, Jacques Cornano has been elected twice in the first round of voting as Mayor of Saint-Louis. Indeed, during his first mandate he managed to tackle the city’s debt and was then elected again in 2008 as well as in 2014.

=== Substitute deputy of Éric Jalton and Departement Councillor ===
On the occasion of the French legislative elections of 2002, Jacques Cornano became the substitute deputy of Éric Jalton (deputy of the first circonscription [sic?] of Guadeloupe). Since the latter was elected again in 2007, Jacques Cornanohas remained in this position. Also very involved in local life, he became a councillor for the Canton de Saint Louis after being elected Mayor of Saint-Louis. He occupied this position until his election as Senator in 2011.

=== Senator of Guadeloupe ===
In 2011, Jacques Cornano ran for the Senate elections and was elected Senator of Guadeloupe (Miscellaneous Left) with 53.65% of the votes in the second round, along with his colleagues, Mr Jacques GILLOT and Mr Felix DESPLAN. Because of his roots in Marie-Galante, Jacques Cornano pays particular attention to issues relating to the islanders. The main example of this is probably the issue of fairness in the context of the principle of territorial continuity for "the southern islands" (Marie-Galante, la Désirade and the îles des Saintes), an important topic that he strongly defends.

As part of his senatorial duties, Jacques Cornano is a member of the delegation of Overseas territories and of the Commission on Sustainable Development, infrastructure, equipment and land. In early 2015, he was also appointed rapporteur of the working group "Les Outre-Mer confrontés au changement climatique" within the context of the preparation of the 21st Conference of Parties (COP21).
