= Aurélie Filippetti =

French politician and writer

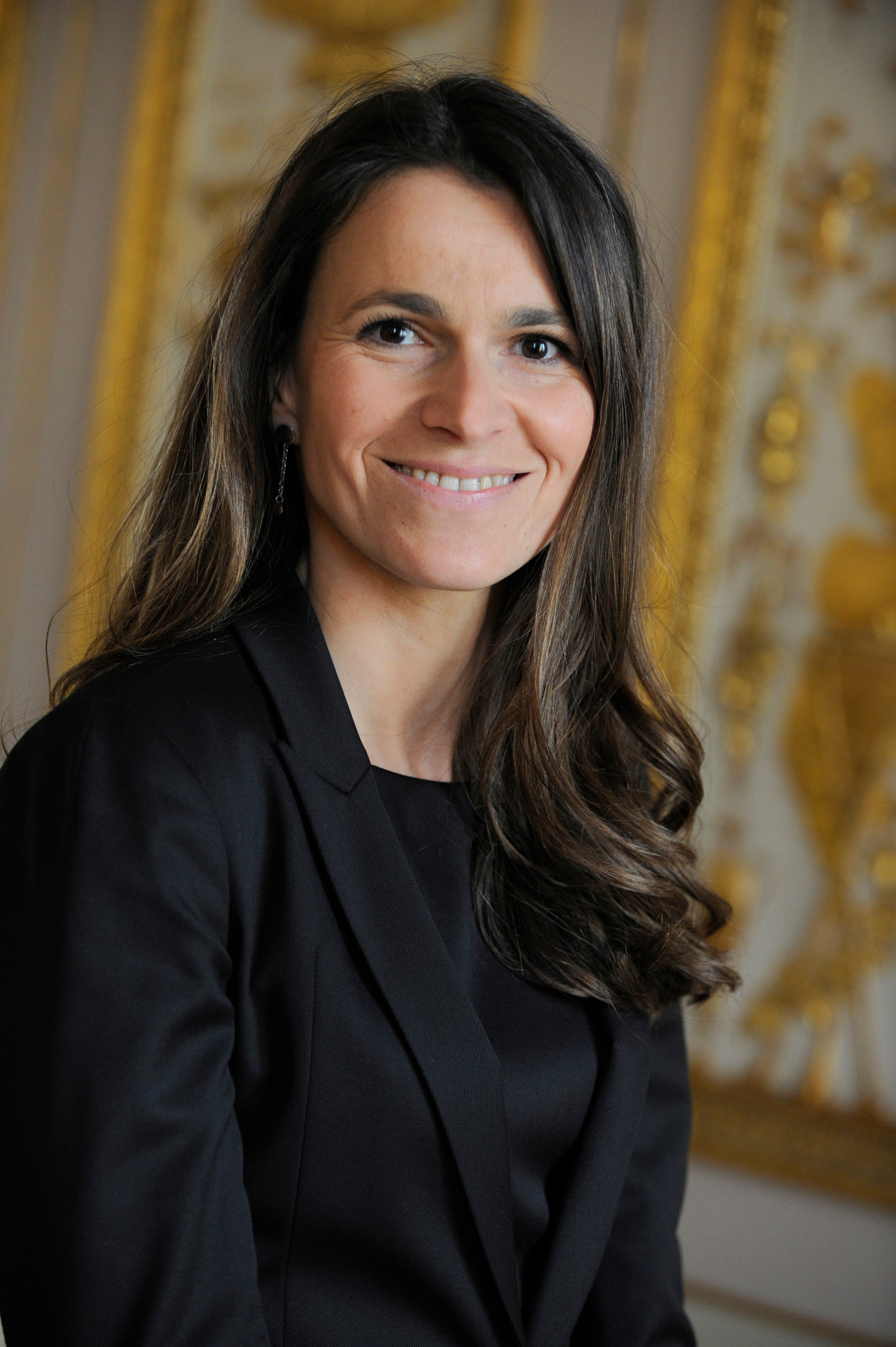

Member of the National Assembly for Moselle's 1st constituency
- In office 27 September 2014 – 20 June 2017
- Preceded by: Gérard Terrier
- Succeeded by: Belkhir Belhaddad

French Minister of Culture and Communications
- In office 16 May 2012 – 26 August 2014
- President: François Hollande
- Prime Minister: Jean-Marc Ayrault; Manuel Valls
- Preceded by: Frédéric Mitterrand
- Succeeded by: Fleur Pellerin

Personal details
- Born: 17 June 1973 (age 53) Villerupt, France
- Party: The Greens (1999–2006); Socialist Party (2006–2018); Génération.s (2018–present)
- Domestic partner(s): Frédéric de Saint-Sernin; Arnaud Montebourg
- Children: 2
- Education: École normale supérieure de lettres et sciences humaines

Aurélie Filippetti (French pronunciation: [ɔʁeli filipɛti]; born 17 June 1973) is a French politician and novelist. She served as French Minister of Culture and Communications from 2012 until 2014, first in the government of Jean-Marc Ayrault and then in the government of Manuel Valls.

== Early life and career ==
Filippetti is of Italian descent and her family originates from Gualdo Tadino, Umbria. She is an alumna of the elite École normale supérieure de Fontenay–Saint-Cloud, she received an agrégation in Classic Literature.

== Career as a writer ==
Filippetti's first novel Les derniers jours de la classe Ouvrière (The Last Days of the Working Class), published by Stock in 2003, has been translated into several languages. In 2003, Filippetti wrote the script for the theatre production Fragments d'humanité.

== Political career ==
Filippetti was a delegate of the French Greens for the Paris municipality and acted as the technical adviser for the Minister of the Environment, Yves Cochet, from 2001 to 2002.

From 2007 until 2012, Filippetti was a member of the National Assembly of France, representing the Moselle département. In parliament, she served on the Committee on Cultural Affairs (2007-2008), the Committee on Legal Affairs (2008-2010) and the Finance Committee (2010-2012).

On Filippetti's initiative, the National Assembly passed a law in 2013 preventing internet booksellers from offering free delivery to customers, in an attempt to protect the country's struggling bookshops from the growing dominance of US online retailer Amazon. In 2014, Filippetti dismissed Anne Baldassari, the director of the Musée Picasso, after mounting criticism of her management.

Following the resignation of Arnaud Montebourg in protest against Hollande's economic policies, Filippetti and Benoît Hamon also resigned on 25 August 2014.

Following her resignation, Filippetti returned to parliament, where she served on the Finance Committee from 2014 until 2017. In the vote on the 2015 budget, she was one of 39 socialist deputies who abstained. She lost her parliamentary seat in the 2017 election.

In the Socialist Party's presidential primaries, Filippetti endorsed Montebourg as the party's candidate for that year's presidential elections. When Hamon was chosen instead, she joined his campaign team as spokesperson.

Filippetti was excluded for 18 months after supporting a dissident list, and announced January, 17th 2018 that she left the Socialist Party and joined Génération.s., the political movement of Benoît Hamon, her former colleague in the French Government.

Later in 2018, Filippetti announced her intention to resign from politics.

In 2016, she was appointed president of the Cinemed film festival. She resigned in 2019 and was succeeded by Leoluca Orlando, former mayor of Palermo.

Filippetti is the director of Cultural Affairs for the City of Paris.

In 2026 Filippetti represented the organisation of Cultural Affairs of the City of Paris as a member of the commission to develop a list of 72 women in STEM proposed to be added to the 72 men named on the Eiffel Tower.

== Controversy ==
On 9 November 2004, Filippetti and Xavière Tibéri wrangled after a tense district council meeting. Each of them accused the other one of assault or threats. Tibéri had a head trauma, which she claimed was caused by Filippetti pushing her over; she filed a complaint.

In 2008, Filippetti made headlines when she went public with allegations that former IMF head Dominique Strauss-Kahn had sexually attacked her.

== Personal life ==
Filippetti was in a relationship with economist Thomas Piketty. In 2009, she filed a complaint of domestic violence against him; Piketty apologized for his actions and Filippetti quickly dropped the charges.

In September 2014, Filippetti and Arnaud Montebourg sued Paris Match for invasion of privacy for reporting they are romantically involved; the weekly's cover featured a photo of them during a trip to San Francisco.

From 2014 to the beginning of 2017, Filippetti had a relationship with Montebourg, with whom she had a daughter, Jeanne, born in September 2015. Her first daughter, Clara, is from a previous relationship.

== Bibliography ==
- Les Derniers Jours de la Classe ouvrière, Stock, 2003, Réédité en Livre de Poche (ISBN 2253108596)
- Un homme dans la poche, Stock, 2006

== See also ==
- Audun-le-Tiche#Historical association with mining
