= Saône-et-Loire's 6th constituency =

French legislative constituency

6th constituency of Saône-et-Loire
- inline Constituency of the National Assembly of France
- Deputy: constituency abolished
- Department: Saône-et-Loire
- Cantons: Beaurepaire-en-Bresse, Chalon-sur-Saône Sud, Cuiseaux, Cuisery, Louhans, Montpont-en-Bresse, Montret, Pierre-de-Bresse, Saint-Germain-du-Bois, Saint-Germain-du-Plain, Saint-Martin-en-Bresse, Tournus, Verdun-sur-le-Doubs.

The 6th constituency of Saône-et-Loire was a French legislative constituency in the Saône-et-Loire département.

Following the 2009 redistricting, the constituency was abolished; its borders, however, are nearly coterminous with the redrawn 4th constituency.

== Deputies ==
Election	Member	Party
1986	constituency created	
1988	René Beaumont	UDF
1997	Arnaud Montebourg	PS
2012	constituency abolished	

== Election results ==
=== 1997 ===
Legislative Election 1997: Saône-et-Loire 6th constituency – 2nd round
Party	Candidate	Votes	%	±%
PS	Arnaud Montebourg	28,373	53.67	
UDF	René Beaumont	24,495	46.33	
Turnout		54,084	69.60	
PS hold		Swing		

=== 2002 ===
Legislative Election 2002: Saône-et-Loire 6th constituency – 2nd round
Party	Candidate	Votes	%	±%
PS	Arnaud Montebourg	27,176	55.43	+1.76
UMP	Francis Szpiner	21,850	44.57	
Turnout		50,824	63.16	–6.44
PS hold		Swing	–1.76	

=== 2007 ===
Legislative Election 2007: Saône-et-Loire 6th constituency – 2nd round
Party	Candidate	Votes	%	±%
PS	Arnaud Montebourg	29,361	50.34	–5.09
UMP	Arnaud Danjean	28,965	49.66	+5.09
Turnout		59,514	69.90	+6.74
PS hold		Swing	–5.09	

== Sources ==
- Official results of 1997 French legislative election: "Résultats des élections législatives des 25 mai et 1er juin 1997 par circonscription" (in French).
- Official results of French elections from 1998: "Résultats électoraux officiels en France" (in French).
