= Henri Cabanel =

French politician (born 1959)

Henri Cabanel (born March 9, 1959) is a French politician. He has served as a member of the Senate of France since 2014, representing the Hérault department.

== Biography ==
A Winemaker by profession, he was elected general councilor for the canton of Servian in 2003, then appointed vice-president of the general council in 2011.

He left this latter position in 2014 when he became a senator, saying he wanted to devote himself fully to his new mandate, in line with his commitment to not holding multiple offices at the same time.

In the Senate, he is a member of the European Democratic and Social Rally group and sits on the Economic Affairs Committee and the Business Delegation.

In 2016, he joined Arnaud Montebourg campaign team for the 2017 primary election. He subsequently became a member of the party created by the former minister, L'Engagement.
