= New Deal (France) =

French left political party

New Deal Nouvelle Donne
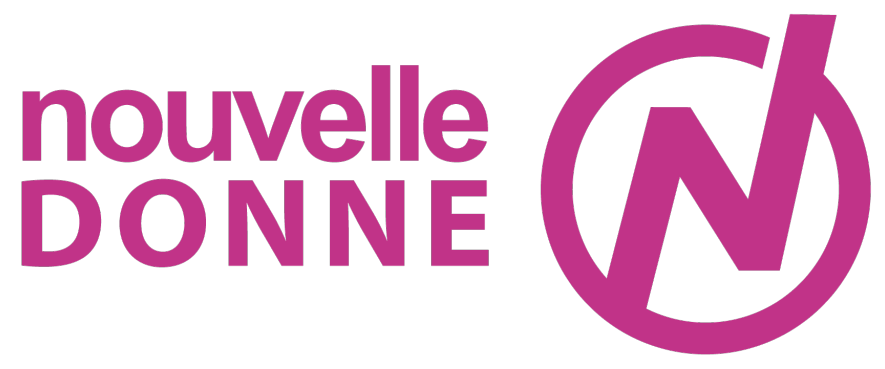
- Co-Presidents: Arnaud Lelache; Aline Mouquet
- Founder: Pierre Larrouturou
- Founded: 28 November 2013
- Headquarters: Paris
- Membership (2016): 2,500
- Ideology: Progressivism; Keynesianism
- Political position: Centre-left to left-wing
- National affiliation: New Popular Front (2024–present); New Ecological and Social People's Union (2022–2024)
- European Parliament group: Progressive Alliance of Socialists and Democrats
- Colors: Fuchsia
- National Assembly: 0 / 577
- Senate: 0 / 348
- European Parliament: 0 / 74

Website
- www.nouvelledonne.fr

New Deal (French: Nouvelle Donne) is a Keynesian liberal and progressive political party in France. It was founded on 18 November 2013 by Pierre Larrouturou. Its stated aims are to renew how democracy is used, and it has social, ecological and economic goals, which could be defined as left-wing.

== History ==
In the wake of the 2012 French presidential election, the "Collectif Roosevelt" was launched to promote 15 propositions to all the candidates, which had been signed into a manifesto by over 100,000 people. After François Hollande's victory, Pierre Larrouturou and Stéphane Hessel chose to put these ideas to vote within the Parti Socialiste (PS) at the Toulouse meeting, which was to elect the new leader of the party. However, their motion obtained only 11.78% of the votes, ranking it third.

Following these events, Pierre Larrouturou announced the creation of the New Deal party, effectively leaving the Socialist Party, on 28 November 2013. The party was named after the New Deal, the political program launched by Franklin D. Roosevelt in the 1930s to get the United States out of the Great Depression. New Deal has highlighted that very low economic growth in France has been the norm for a generation, and postulates that the crisis is the result of inequalities of economic redistribution, in terms of wealth and working time. For instance, it proposes the revision of fiscal policies and the division of labour, though reducing working time. Those policies would be sustained by Keynesian policies, based on ecological needs.

The party wants to unite citizens who have not previously been involved in politics, supporters of the Left Front, the Europe Ecology – The Greens, the Socialist Party (PS), The MoDem, people from social Gaullism, CEOs, as well as contingent workers, and French celebrities.

== Political position ==
New Deal is located on the left-wing of the political spectrum, in the context of French politics, but it is sometimes described as the centre-left. The party values political, conscientious, speech, and individual freedom, and supports social justice and environmentalism.

New Deal is also a socially liberal party. While in French politics social liberalism is generally classified as centrist, New Deal is classified as more left-leaning than the Socialist Party, a centre-left party with a tendency towards social democracy. The party can be seen as advocating progressivism.

== Election results ==
=== European Parliament ===
Election	Leader	Votes	%	Seats	+/−	EP Group
2014	Unclear	549,734	2.90 (#8)	0 / 79	New	−
2019 (Note: Run in a joint list with PS, PP and PRG, that won 6 seats in total.)	Raphaël Glucksmann	1,403,170	6.19 (#6)	1 / 79	▲1	S&D
2024 (Note: Run in a joint list with AE, that won no seats.)	Pierre Larrouturou	13,251	0.05 (#22)	0 / 81	▼1	−

== See also ==
- Political Parties of France
- MoDem
- Europe Ecology – The Greens
- Social Gaullism
- Left Front (France)
- New Deal liberalism
- Reiwa Shinsengumi, another liberal party classified as "left-wing".
