= Daniel Reiner =

French politician (born 1941)

Daniel Reiner (born 17 January 1941 in Moissac) was a member of the Senate of France, representing the Meurthe-et-Moselle department from 2001 to 2017. He is a member of the Socialist Party.
