= René Beaumont =

French politician

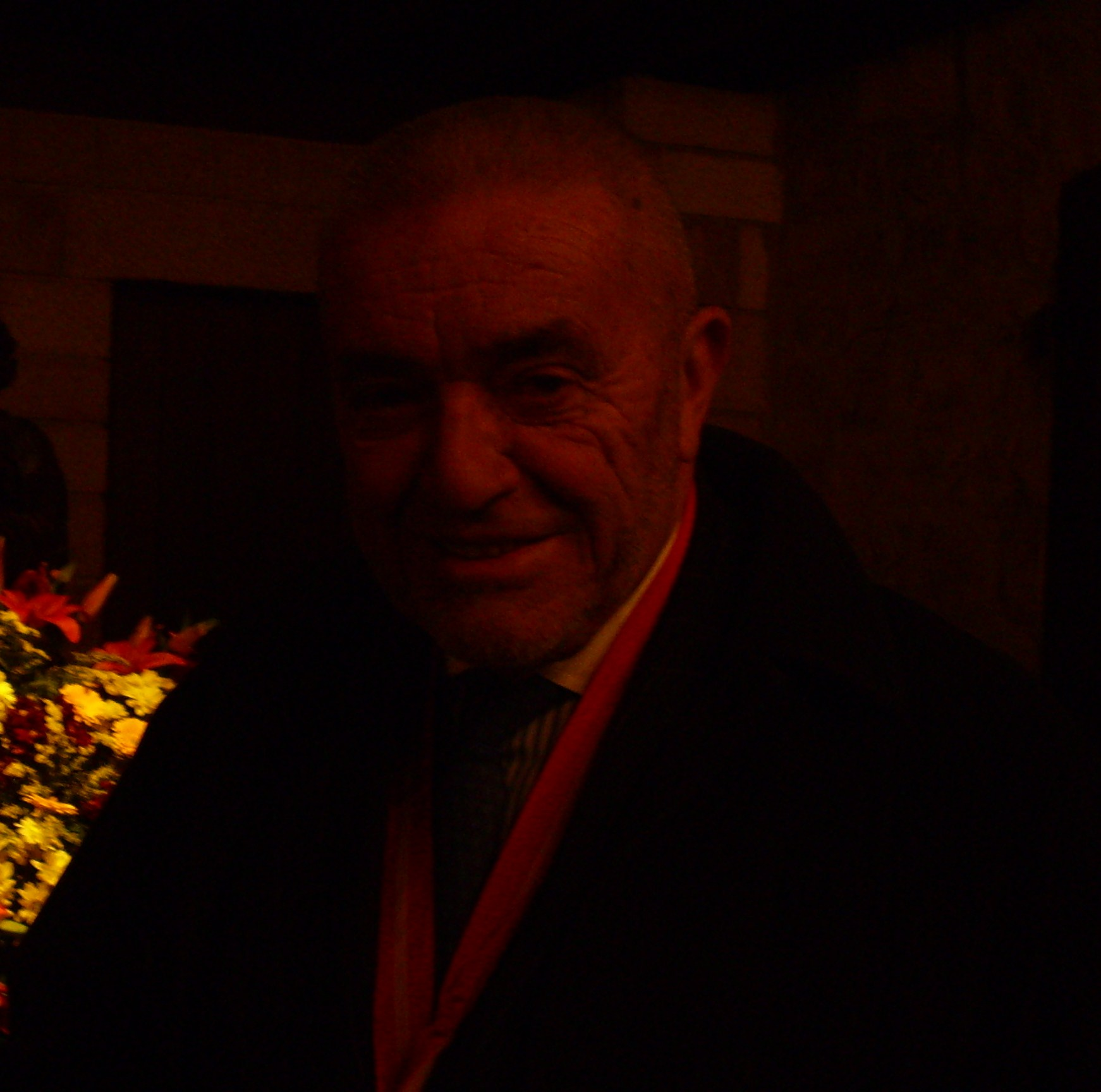
René Beaumont (French politician)

René Beaumont (born 29 February 1940 in Lyon) is a French politician. He was a member of the Union for French Democracy and is currently a member of the Union for a Popular Movement. A veterinarian by profession, he has also been a senator from Saône-et-Loire since 26 September 2004.

== Other positions ==
- Adjunct to the mayor of Varennes-Saint-Sauveur
- President of the Communauté de communes du Canton de Cuiseaux

== Former positions ==
- Deputy of Saône et Loire from 1986 to 1988, then deputy of the 6th district (Louhans) from 1988 to 1997, lost in 1997 to Arnaud Montebourg;
- President of the Conseil Général de Saône-et-Loire from 1985 to 2004;
- Mayor of Varennes-Saint-Sauveur from 1970 to 2001.
