= Marie-Hélène Aubert =

French politician

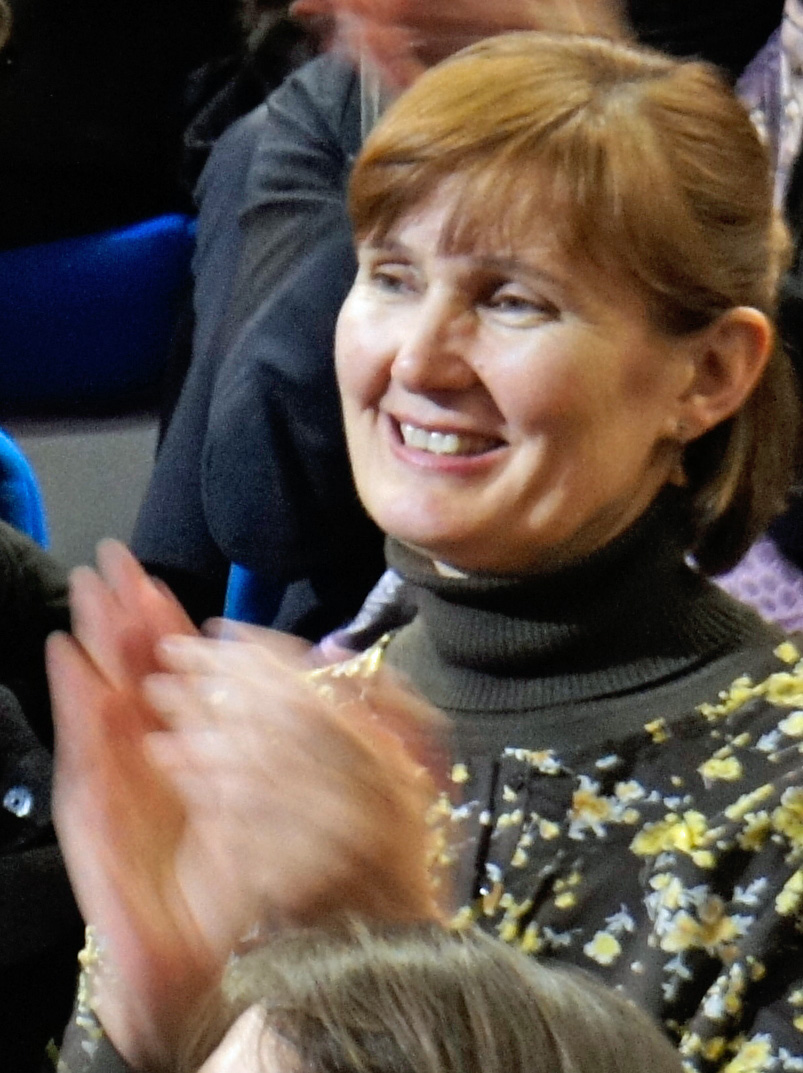
Marie-Hélène Aubert (2012)

Marie-Hélène Aubert (French pronunciation: [maʁi elɛn obɛʁ]; born 16 November 1955 in Nantes) is a French politician and former Member of the European Parliament for the West of France. She is a member of the Socialist Party, having quit the Greens in 2008. Aubert was a Vice Chair of the ACP-EU Joint Parliamentary Assembly.
