= Michel Vergoz =

French politician

Member of the French Senate
- In office 2011–2017
- Constituency: Réunion

Mayor of Sainte-Rose, Réunion
- Incumbent
- Assumed office 5 July 2015
- In office 20 March 1989 – 18 March 2001

Personal details
- Born: January 10, 1950 (age 76) Saint-Denis, Réunion
- Party: La République En Marche!
- Occupation: Pharmacist

Michel Vergoz (born 10 January 1950) is a member of the Senate of France. He was first elected in 2011, and represents the Réunion department. A pharmacist by profession, he serves as a member of the Socialist Party. He was the mayor of Sainte-Rose, Réunion from 1989 to 2001.
