= Daniel Raoul =

French politician (born 1941)

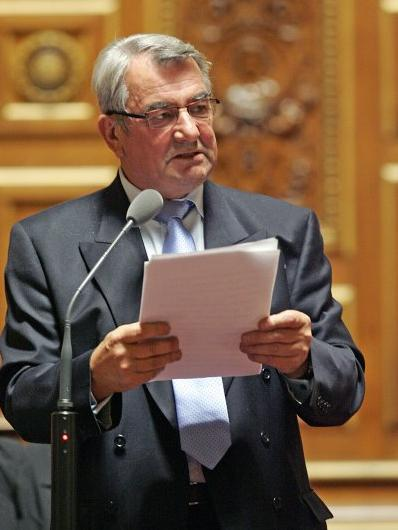
Daniel Raoul

Daniel Raoul (born 28 July 1941) is a former member of the Senate of France who represented the Maine-et-Loire department from 2001 to 2017. He is a member of the Socialist Party.
