= Pascal Demarthe =

French politician

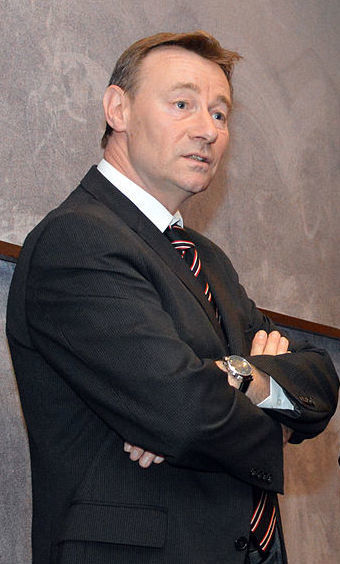
- Pascal Demarthe
- Born: 29 January 1960 (age 66); Abbeville, Somme, France
- Occupation: Politician
- Political party: Socialist Party

Pascal Demarthe (born 29 January 1960) is a French politician. He has served as a member of the National Assembly since 2014, representing Somme.
