= Jean-Luc Bennahmias =

French politician (born 1954)

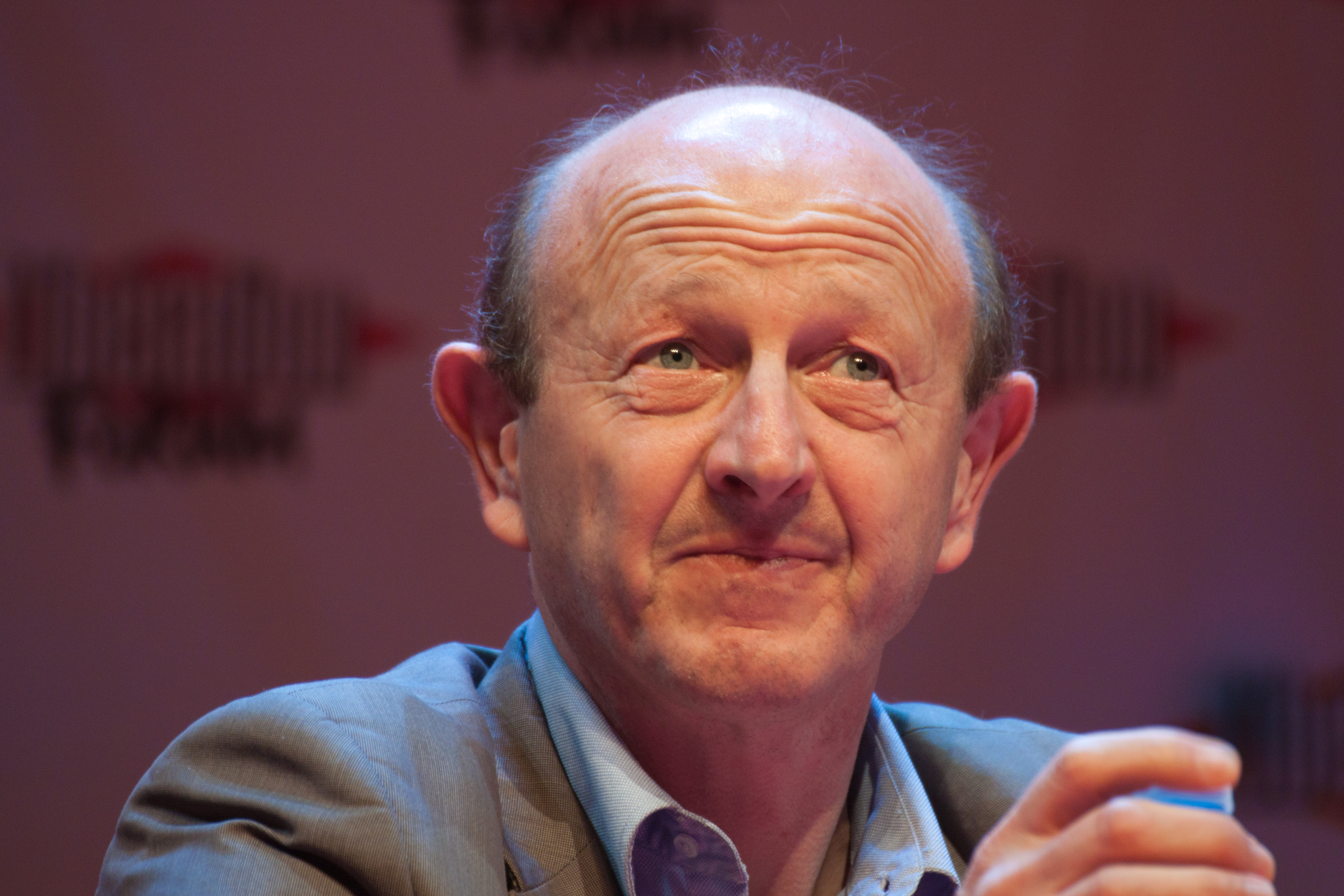
- Jean-Luc Bennahmias in 2012

Member of the European Parliament
- In office 2004–2014
- Constituency: South East France

Member of the Regional council of Provence-Alpes-Côte d'Azur
- In office 2004–2010
- President: Michel Vauzelle

Personal details
- Born: 2 December 1954 (age 71) Paris, France
- Party: Democratic Front

Jean-Luc Bennahmias (born 2 December 1954) is a French politician.

== Political career ==
Bennahmias was National secretary of the Green Party (1997–2001), Regional councillor (1992–1996) and Chairman of the Green Group on the Provence-Alpes-Côte d'Azur Regional Council (2004–2010), Member of the European Parliament (2004–2014). He joined in 2007 the Democratic Movement, and sat on the European Parliament's Committee on Employment and Social Affairs and was also a substitute for the Committee on Culture and Education, a substitute for the Committee on Petitions, a member of the Delegation for relations with South Africa, and a substitute for the Delegation for relations with Canada.

Bennahmias was the candidate of the Democratic Movement for the municipal elections in Marseille in March 2008. He left the centrist party to create his own centre-left party in 2014.

== Professional career ==
- Advanced Technician's Certificate (1976)
- University diploma in training (1984)
- Journalist (1974–1994)

== Personal life ==
He is of Sephardi Jew descent.
