= École supérieure de journalisme =

Higher education institution in France

The ESJ or École supérieure de journalisme (in English: Tertiary college of Journalism) is an institution of higher education and French Grande École dedicated to the study of Journalism. It has three sites in France:

- ESJ Lille
- ESJ Montpellier is linked to the ESJ Lille
- ESJ Paris is still independent from the two others
