= François Marc =

French politician

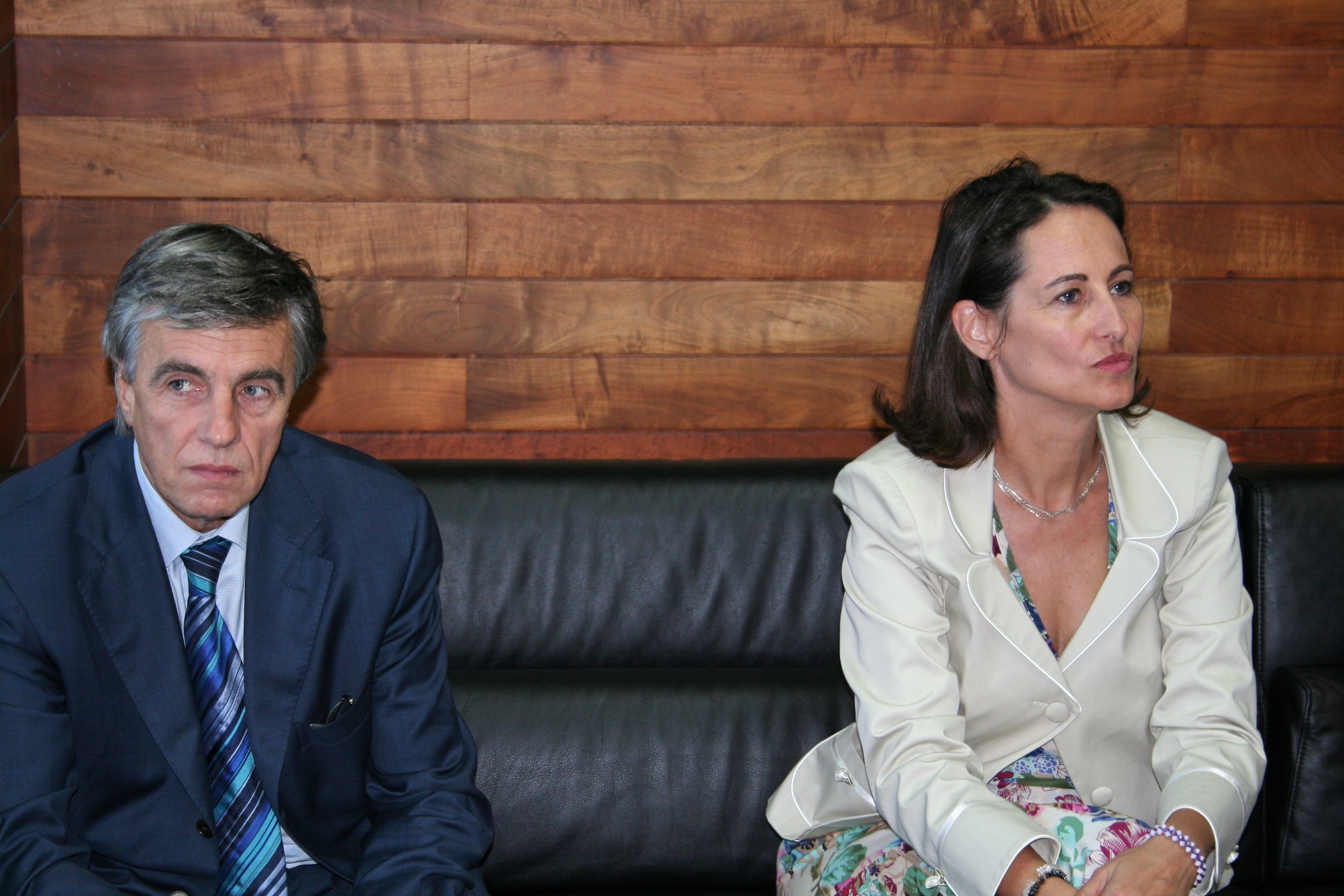
François Marc with Ségolène Royal (October 2006)

François Marc (born 19 March 1950) is a former member of the Senate of France, representing the Finistère department from 1998 to 2017. He is a member of the Socialist Party.
