= Arnaud Montebourg =

French politician, lawyer and entrepreneur (born 1962)

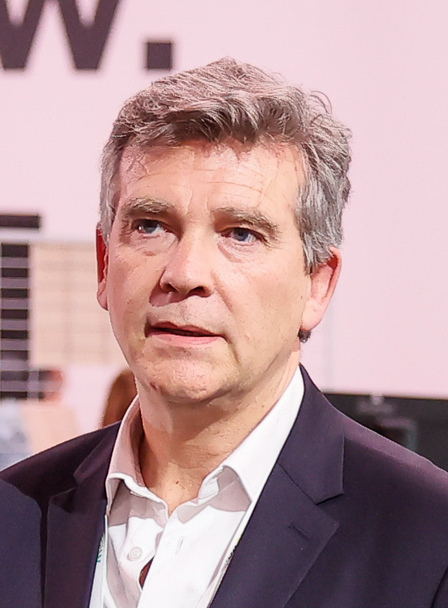
- Montebourg in 2022

Minister of Economy, Industrial Renewal and Digital Affairs (Note: Minister of Industrial Renewal until 2 April 2014.)
- In office 16 May 2012 – 25 August 2014
- Prime Minister: Jean-Marc Ayrault; Manuel Valls
- Preceded by: Éric Besson
- Succeeded by: Emmanuel Macron

President of the General Council of Saône-et-Loire
- In office 27 March 2008 – 21 June 2012
- Preceded by: Christophe Sirugue
- Succeeded by: Rémi Chaintron

Member of the National Assembly for Saône-et-Loire's 6th constituency
- In office 12 June 1997 – 16 June 2012
- Preceded by: René Beaumont
- Succeeded by: Rémi Chaintron

Personal details
- Born: 30 October 1962 (age 63) Clamecy, France
- Party: Socialist Party (1985–2018); L'Engagement (2021–present)
- Spouse(s): Hortense de Labriffe (1997–2010); Amina Walter (m. 2021)
- Domestic partner(s): Audrey Pulvar (2010–2012); Aurélie Filippetti (2014–2017)
- Education: University of Burgundy; Panthéon-Sorbonne University; Sciences Po; INSEAD
- Occupation: Lawyer; Entrepreneur

Arnaud Montebourg ([aʁno mɔ̃t(ə)buʁ]; born 30 October 1962) is a French politician, lawyer and entrepreneur who served as Minister of Industrial Renewal from May 2012 to April 2014, then as Minister of Economy, Industrial Renewal and Digital Affairs until August 2014. He is a former member of the Socialist Party (PS), having participated in its 2011 and 2017 presidential primaries, finishing third both times. Following his 2017 primary run, he withdrew from active politics but remained a public commentator, leaving the PS in 2018.

A native of Nièvre, Montebourg grew up in neighbouring Côte-d'Or. He worked as a lawyer in Paris until his election to the National Assembly in the 6th constituency of Saône-et-Loire in 1997, a seat he retained until his appointment to the government to 2012. Locally, Montebourg was elected to the General Council of Saône-et-Loire for the canton of Montret from 2008 to 2015, holding the council's presidency from 2008 to 2012. In 2014, comments he made criticising the government's economic policy led to its resignation the day following, and the formation of a new government. Montebourg had characterised his political action as social-patriotic, criticising the government's austerity measures.

In 2015, Montebourg founded Les Équipes du Made in France, a company designed to support French businesses in agriculture and industry. In the years that followed, he helped launch a number of French businesses, including in the production of honey (Bleu Blanc Ruche) in 2018 and almonds (Compagnie des amandes) in 2023, as well as in railway transport (Ferromobile) in 2022. Ahead of the 2022 presidential election, he announced his candidacy, before withdrawing.

== Early life and education ==
Montebourg was born on 30 October 1962, in the French commune of Clamecy, in Nièvre department. His father, Michel Montebourg, who was a tax inspector for the Ministry of Economy and Finances, was born in 1933. His mother, Leïla Ould Cadi, who was born in 1939 in Algeria, was of Algerian and French descent; she was born into a family of wālis (governors) from Hachem in Northern Algeria. His Algerian grandfather fought in the French Army during World War II. His Algerian great-grandfather, Ahmed Ould Cadi, who was an agha (chieftain), fought against the Ottoman caliphate before joining the French Army. He was appointed Grand Cross of the Legion of Honour in 1867.

Montebourg began working as a lawyer in 1990 with notable lawyer Thierry Lévy in Paris.

He has worked in several publicised cases. In 1995, he worked as the lawyer of Christian Didier, assassin of René Bousquet. Bousquet was a former Vichy official who had been indicted for war crimes and was soon to be tried. Didier was convicted in 1995 and received a 10-year sentence. Didier did not want to be considered insane, so Montebourg helped get the court to recognise him as responsible for the act.

== In the National Assembly ==
Montebourg was first elected to the National Assembly in Saône-et-Loire in the 1997 legislative election. He was reelected in 2002 and 2007.

In 2001, together with Bastien François, a professor of Political Science at Panthéon-Sorbonne University, Montebourg became the cofounder of the Convention pour la VI-ème République (C6R). This convention called for significant constitutional changes, and for a Sixth French Republic. Its objectives were to decrease the power of the president and allow a parliamentary balance.

Montebourg was one of the founding members of the political movement known as the Nouveau Parti Socialiste (New Socialist Party), where he defended economical protectionism and sovereignty. When the movement ended due to internal difficulties, he created a new movement within the Socialist Party called Rénover, Maintenant (Renewal, Now). He was one of the leading opponents of President Jacques Chirac's immunity from prosecution, especially concerning the corruption scandals in the Paris region.

Montebourg also supported reporter Denis Robert for his role in revealing the illegal system of double-accounts maintained by Clearstream, a clearing-house based in Luxembourg, involving high-ranking politicians. He has also been engaged in a campaign against the rules governing taxation of foreign nationals and the banking secrecy of Switzerland.

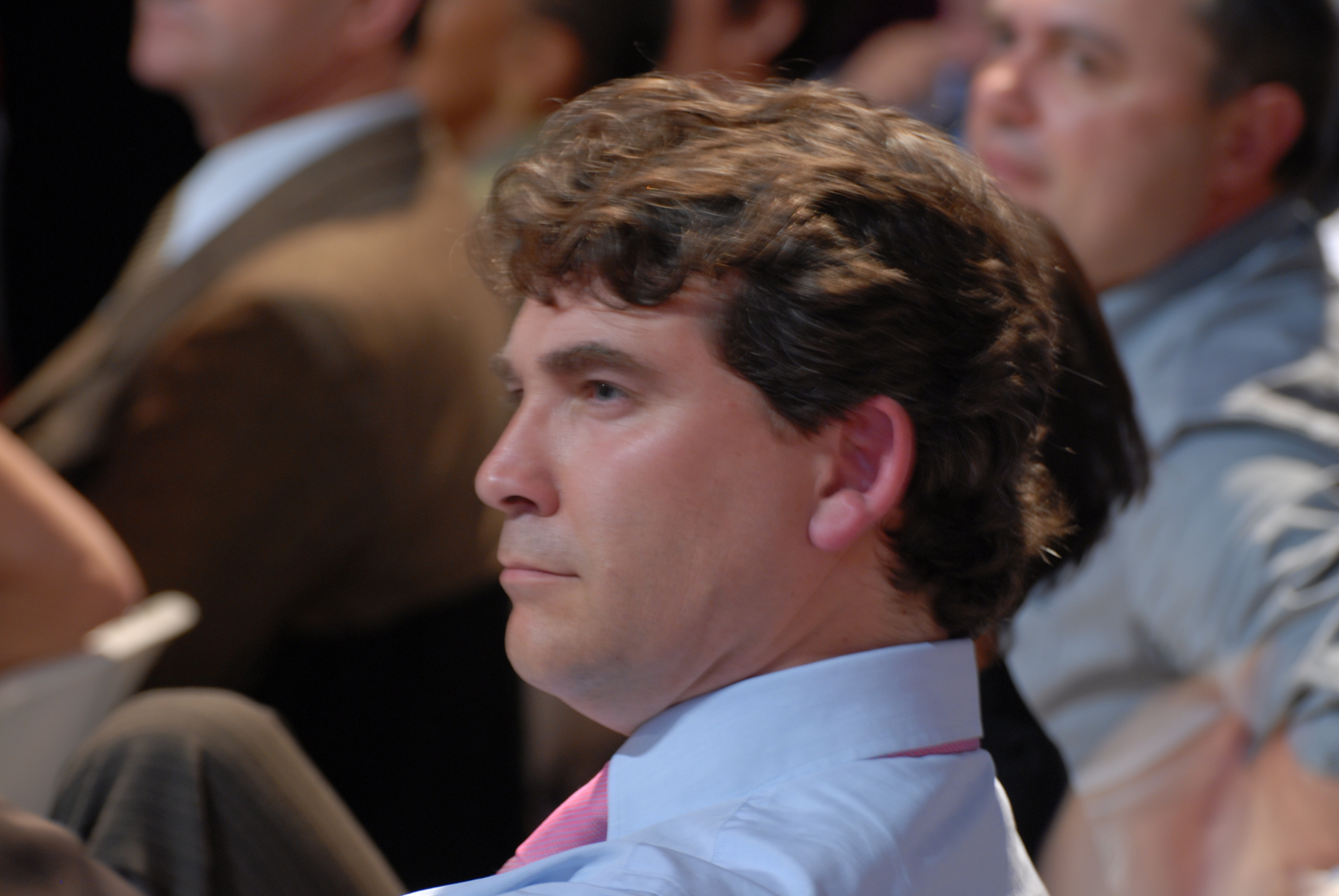
Montebourg at a Ségolène Royal rally featuring José Luis Rodríguez Zapatero in Toulouse ahead of the 2007 presidential election

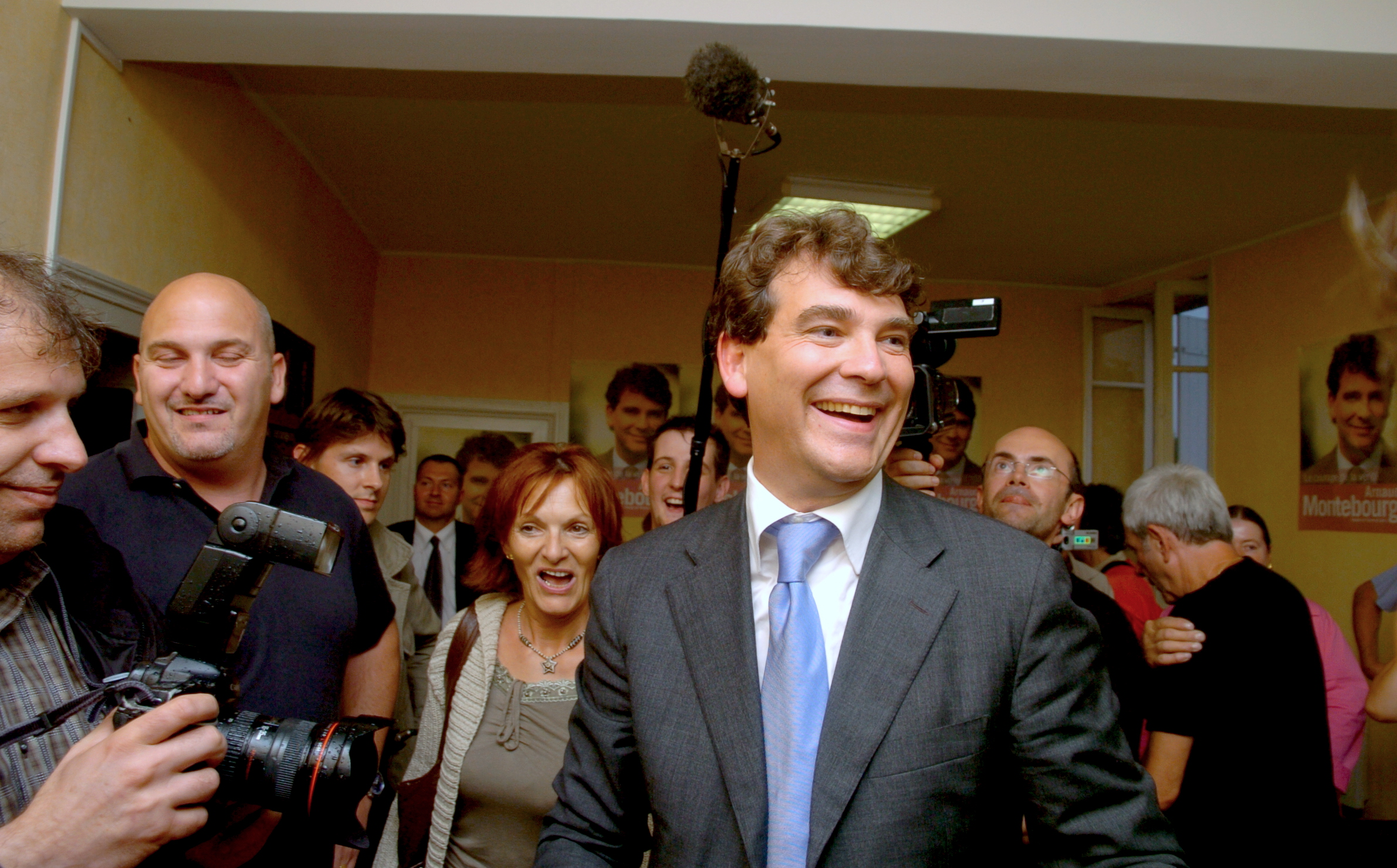
Montebourg on the evening of his reelection to the National Assembly on 17 June 2007

Montebourg was appointed spokesman for Ségolène Royal's presidential campaign following his endorsement of her candidacy during the Socialist Party primary election in November 2006. On 18 January 2007, Royal suspended him from her campaign for one month the day after he gave an interview on a Canal+ talk show, where he said, "Ségolène Royal has only one fault, her partner." He was referring to the contradictory statements on tax policy made by Royal's partner, François Hollande, who was at the time serving as First Secretary of the Socialist Party. Montebourg had offered his resignation, which Royal declined to accept.

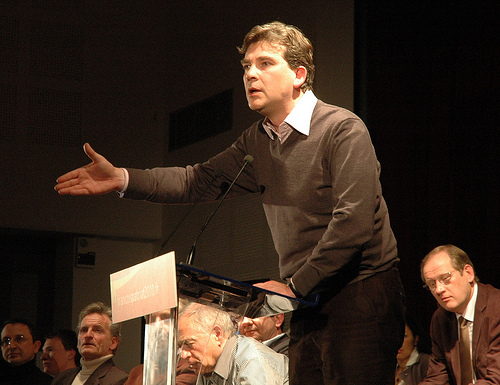
Montebourg speaking to constituents in Blanzy, 2010

In 2008, Monteboug became President of the General Council of Saône-et-Loire, elected in the canton of Montret, while at the same time retaining his mandate as a parliamentarian. In 2011, when Dominique Strauss-Kahn was released from prison and flown back to France, Montebourg urged him to apologise for embarrassing the Socialist Party.

== In government under the presidency of François Hollande ==
Montebourg finished third in the Socialist Party's primary election for the 2012 presidential election, receiving about 17% of the vote. François Hollande finished first; after Hollande was elected President of France, Montebourg was appointed Minister of Industrial Renewal on 16 May 2012 in the government of Prime Minister Jean-Marc Ayrault. On 2 April 2014, his portfolio was expanded to become the Ministry of Economy, Industrial Renewal and Digital Affairs in the government of Manuel Valls, following Pierre Moscovici leaving the government.

Montebourg defended nuclear energy, considering it "an industry of the future" despite the 2011 Fukushima Daiichi nuclear disaster. On national interests in international trade alliances, Montebourg made further controversial statements about Lakshmi Mittal by declaring that "Mittal's lies since 2006 are overwhelming… he has never kept his word", urging him to leave the country: "We no longer want Mittal in France because they don't respect France."

Montebourg considered the General Electric takeover of Alstom a risk to French sovereignty. He notably introduced a decree, the décret Alstom, nicknamed décret Montebourg by the press, extending the French state's right to veto foreign takeovers of assets in the energy, water, transport, telecommunication, public health sectors. Montebourg was quoted as saying the decree protected France's strategic interests and represented the end of laissez-faire economic policy.

On 11 February 2014, Montebourg was among the guests invited to the state dinner hosted by US President Barack Obama in honour of Hollande at the White House.

On 28 May 2014, Montebourg said that if the United Kingdom "were to vote to leave the EU, France will roll out the red carpet to British investors who will flee their country. They will all come to France because companies need Europe." Nevertheless, he supports a balance between the EU's interests and states' interests.

On 24 August 2014, Montebourg made public comments disparaging the government's economic policy. He resigned the following day, citing policy differences with Valls; Montebourg had presented himself as a social-patriot, criticising the government's austerity measures. Montebourg was supported in this criticism by Education Minister Benoît Hamon and Culture Minister Aurélie Filippetti. On 26 August, Valls presented Hollande with the resignation of his government.

== Businesses ==
In October 2014, Montebourg enrolled in the INSEAD graduate business school for a four-week course and sought a bursary for his studies.

In January 2015, he launched Les Équipes du Made in France with his savings, to "implement French projects", as "a tool for bringing together financial, industrial, production and management teams to either take over or create businesses." The company's focus lies on agricultural and industrial projects. Between 16 and 26 February 2015, he was invited as a visiting professor of economics at Princeton University.

On 19 March 2015, he was appointed vice president of the supervisory board of the furniture chain Habitat. On 26 March, the French-based consulting and business analyst company Talan announced that Montebourg had been given a place on its strategic policy committee.

In 2023, Les Echos reported Montebourg to be at the helm of ten businesses.

== Candidacy in the 2017 Socialist primary election ==
On 21 August 2016, he announced his plans to run as a candidate for the Socialist Party's presidential nomination in the 2017 presidential election. He finished third with 17.8% of the vote.

== Candidacy in the 2022 presidential election ==
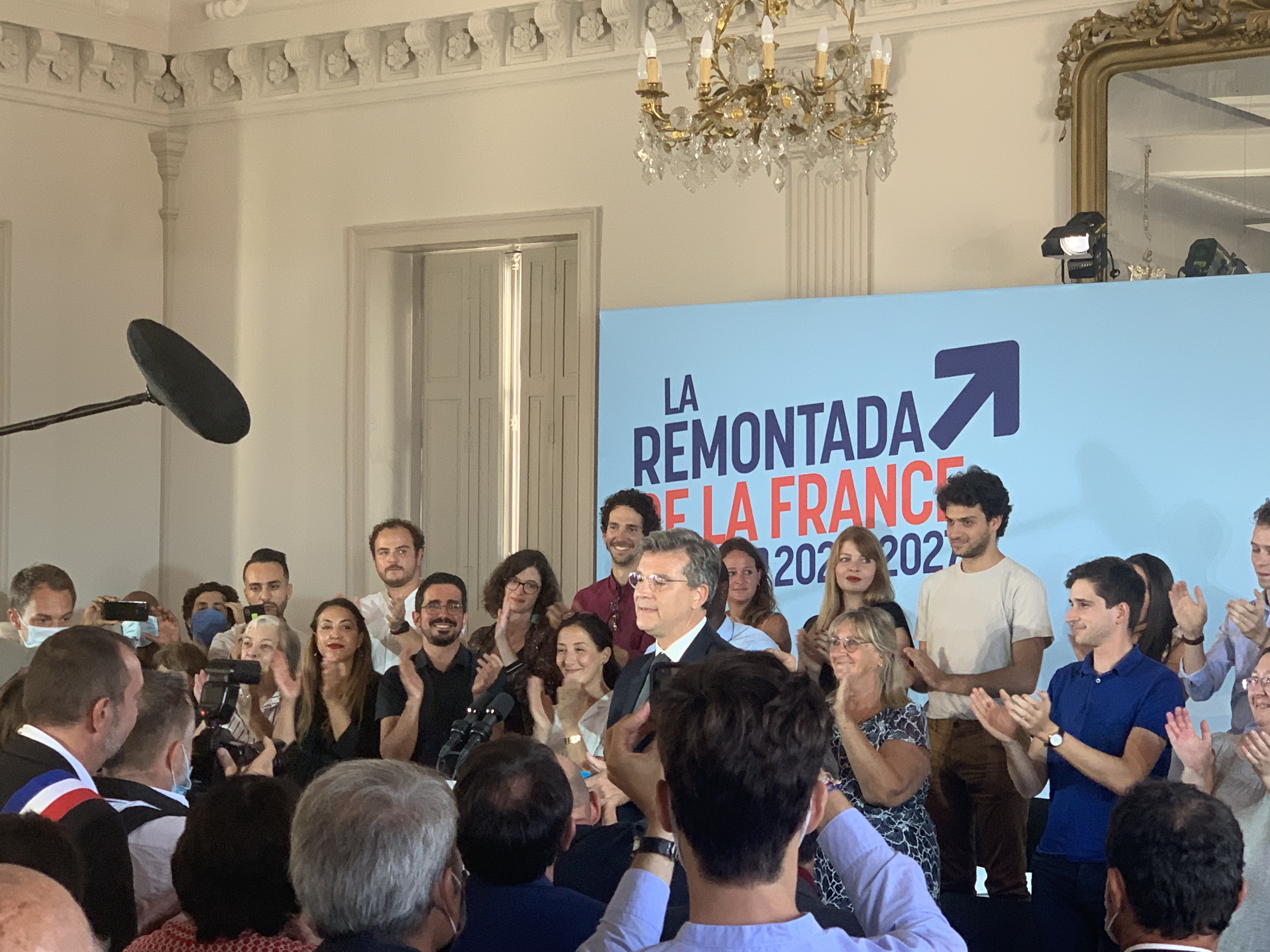
Montebourg announcing his presidential candidacy in Clamecy in 2021

On 4 September 2021, after having taken a step back from politics in 2017, Montebourg announced his candidacy in the 2022 presidential election from his home town of Clamecy, without going through a party primary election. Earlier in 2021 a new party was launched, L'Engagement. With the party lacking significant funds, only events were funded; instead of booking a hotel room after campaign events, he indicated staying over at supporters' houses.

His supporters included the Citizen and Republican Movement, founded by Jean-Pierre Chevènement, the former Socialist minister Laurence Rossignol, Socialist senators Mickaël Vallet and Jean-Claude Tissot, demographer Emmanuel Todd, economist Gaël Giraud, politologist Thomas Guénolé, and economist and entrepreneur Valentin Przyluski. He withdrew from the race on 20 January 2022, after failing to gain momentum. He did not endorse other candidates.

== Personal life ==
Montebourg lived from 2010 to 2012 with journalist Audrey Pulvar and from 2014 until 2017 with fellow minister Aurélie Filippetti, with whom he has a daughter, Jeanne, born in September 2015.

In February 2015, Montebourg was called a hero for saving several fellow diners in the New York City brasserie Balthazar from serious injury by single-handedly holding up a large mirror which had fallen from the restaurant's wall.
