= Pierre Larrouturou =

French politician

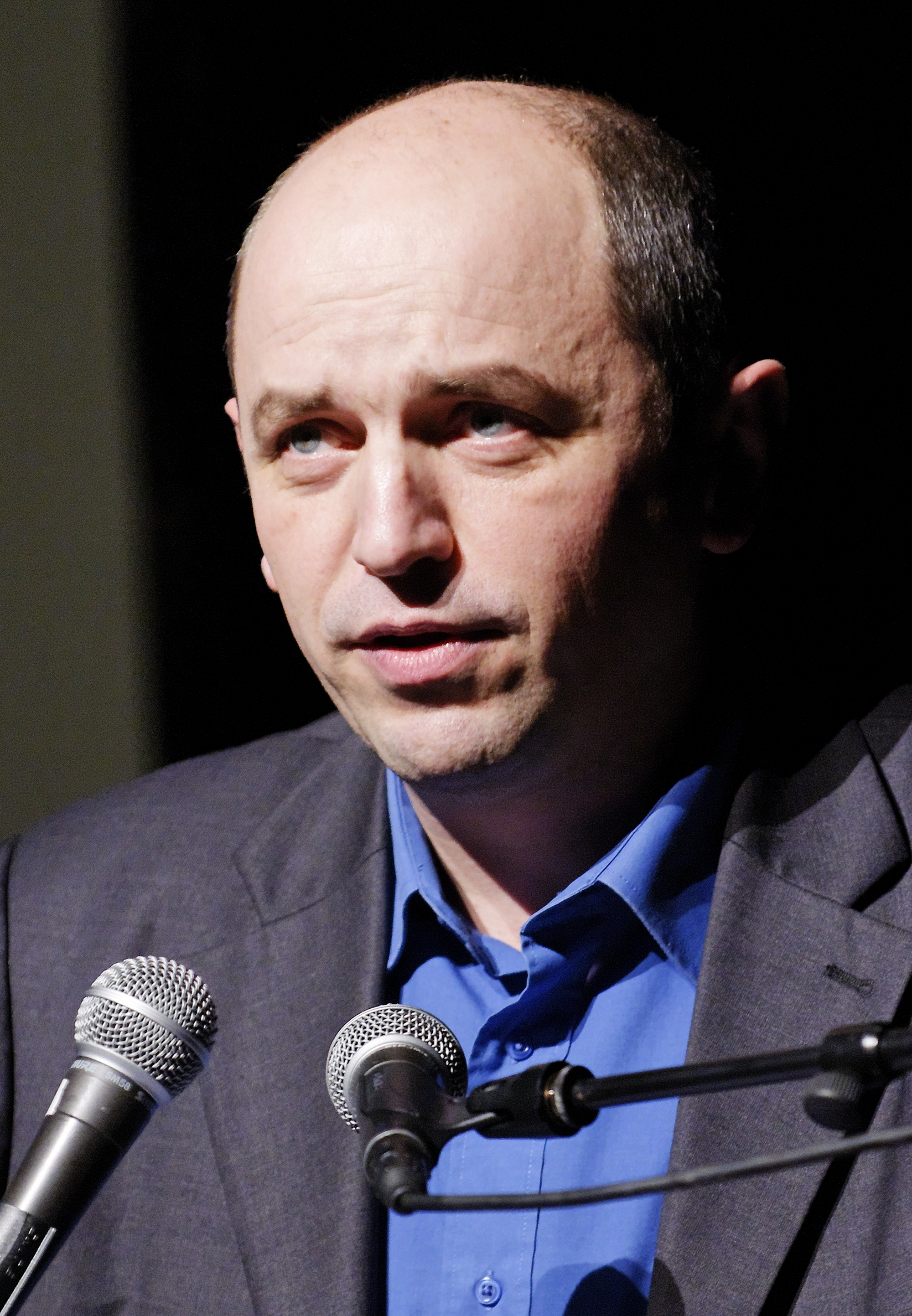
- Pierre Larrouturou in 2010

Member of the European Parliament for France
- In office 2 July 2019 – 15 July 2024

Personal details
- Born: 19 September 1964 (age 61) Périgueux, France
- Party: Socialist

Pierre Larrouturou (born 1964) is a French economist and politician who has been serving as a Member of the European Parliament from 2019 to 2024. He previously was a regional councilor of the Île-de-France.

== Political career ==
=== Early beginnings ===
While still a consultant for the accounting firm Arthur Andersen, Larrouturou first entered national politics in 1993 by issuing a widely discussed 54-page manifesto advocating for a switch to a four-day workweek in France.

=== Member of the European Parliament, 2019–2024 ===
In parliament, Larrouturou has been serving on the Committee on Budgets since 2019. In this capacity, he was his parliamentary group's rapporteur on the budget of the European Union for 2021.

In addition to his committee assignments, Larrouturou is part of the parliament's delegations to the Israel and to the EU-Ukraine Parliamentary Association Committee. He is also a member of the Spinelli Group and the European Parliament Intergroup on Climate Change, Biodiversity and Sustainable Development.

In 2020, Larrouturou made headlines when he went on hunger strike to demand the EU introduce a financial transaction tax by 2024 and to protest against budget plans that downgraded programs on health, research and climate change.

In 2023, Larrouturou was the only French member of the Committee on Budgets not to vote in favor renting 15,000 square meters of office space for the European Parliament in Strasbourg from the French government, arguing that “given the budgetary constraints that are weighing on us I don’t think that renting or acquiring a new building is a priority.”

== Controversy ==
In October 2019, visitors to the European Parliament whom Larrouturou had allowed to enter the building misbehaved. Larrouturou was subsequently sanctioned for his guests’ breach of the rules, specifically those that forbid the compromising of “the smooth conduct of parliamentary business and [...] the maintenance of security and order on Parliament’s premises or the functioning of its equipment.”

== Personal life ==
Larrouturou is married and has two children.
