= Félix Desplan =

French politician (born 1943)

Félix Desplan (born 22 February 1943 in Guadeloupe) is a French politician who represented the department of Guadeloupe in the French Senate from 2011 to 2017.

== Biography ==
A middle school principal by profession, Félix Desplan entered politics during the 1971 municipal elections, when he ran in Pointe-Noire, Guadeloupe and became deputy mayor. He became mayor of this municipality following the 2001 municipal elections and was re-elected in 2008.

Elected regional councilor in 1988, he joined the Departmental Council of Guadeloupe in 2004 following his election in the canton of Pointe-Noire. He immediately became second vice-president of the departmental assembly, then first vice-president in 2008. He announced that he would be stepping down from this position following his election to the Senate.

He ran in the 2011 senatorial elections under the FGPS banner. On September 25, 2011, he obtained 47.92% of the votes in the second round and was elected senator of Guadeloupe. At the end of September 2013, he handed over his position as mayor of Pointe-Noire, Guadeloupe to his first deputy, Tony Sinivassin.
