= Moissac Jewish Children's Home =

- Maison des enfants de Moissac (French)
- Interactive map of Moissac Jewish Children's Home
- Location: 18 Quai du Port, Moissac, Tarn-et-Garonne, France

History
- Built: 18th century building; home established 5 December 1939 – November 1943 (central home); 1944–1951 (Hôtel Moulin)

Site notes
- Governing body: Éclaireurs Israélites de France (EIF)
- Owner: Private residence (commemorative plaque on site; part of Villes et Villages des Justes de France)

The Moissac Jewish Children's Home (La Maison des enfants de Moissac) was a shelter operated by the Jewish Scout Movement (Les Éclaireurs israélites de France, EIF), in the town of Moissac in the Tarn-et-Garonne department of France, between December 1939 and November 1943. Established at the initiative of EIF founder Robert Gamzon at 18 Quai du Port by scout troop leaders Shatta and Bouli Simon, the home sheltered approximately 500 Jewish refugee children and adolescents during the Second World War, with up to 180 residents in the main home and other safe houses in Moissac at any one time. In addition to providing sanctuary, it fostered Jewish education and appreciation of Jewish culture and tradition among its residents, and gradually became a centre for the Jewish resistance movement in southern France.

The Home was founded after the issuing of a 1939 French government directive to parents and other responsible adults to evacuate children and adolescents from the cities just before France declared war on Germany on September 3 of that year. The Home in Moissac was established in a building that had been requisitioned by local authorities to house refugees. Thanks to its scouting affiliations and the Vichy Regime's "back to the land" policy, it initially operated legally. However, as the Vichy regime's anti-Jewish laws intensified and especially when German forces occupied the southern Free Zone (la Zone libre) in November 1942, the home began to rely increasingly on forged identity documents produced by municipal officials and the scouts themselves, and active assistance from teachers, townspeople, and the Jewish resistance network The Sixth (La Sixième), which emerged from the scouting movement. Throughout the war, the home was supported by the town's mayors, Roger Delthil and Louis Moles.

In October 1943, German military police conducted an exploratory inspection/visit of the home. Shortly thereafter, police officer André Capdordy provided an urgent tip-off to Shatta and Bouli Simon of an imminent Gestapo raid. The Simons immediately initiated the 15-day emergency dispersal (planquing), permanently dissolving the central home in November 1943 before any Gestapo raid could take place. Because of this early warning, no children were present when authorities returned. The children in residence at that time, in a dispersal process known among the scouts as "planquing," were protected in the surrounding countryside by local families (many of them from the farming community), or by educational and religious institutions. Some were smuggled to Switzerland or Spain. All children under the direct protection of Shatta and Bouli survived the war.

After the Liberation of France, to continue to support orphaned children and young survivors from the internment camps, Shatta and Bouli Simon, resumed their activities at a new location in Moissac, the Hôtel Moulin which had been converted from a former mill on the banks of the Tarn river. Their sheltering, educational and vocational activities at the hotel ended in October 1951, when most of the home's activities were moved to Château de Laversine. For their activities in shielding the children, and helping the Jewish resistance movement, ten people from the town of Moissac have been recognised by Yad Vashem as Righteous among the Nations. In addition to the ten people from Moissac itself, this article mentions twelve other people recognised as Righteous Among the Nations by Yad Vashem for helping to protect children from the Moissac Home.

== 1923-1938: Founding of the EIF and Early Pre-War Planning ==
In 1923, 18-year old Robert Gamzon, impressed by a visit to a Protestant Scout camp three years earlier, founded the Jewish Scout Movement of France, the Éclaireurs Israélites de France (EIF, today known as Les Éclaireuses et Éclaireurs Israélites de France [EEIF]). Other Jewish youth movements existed, some of them religious and others linked to left Zionist political groups, which recruited their members mainly from young immigrants, but they were extremely divided. The Jewish Scout Movement was intended to be an attractive non-political alternative for young people who wanted to meet other boys and girls of their own age. It requested membership in 1928 of the Interfédéral Scouting association (Bureau interfédéral du scoutisme), the national branch of the World Organisation of the Scout Movement, which was made up of Catholic, Protestant and secular French scouting movements, but it was only admitted in 1938. From the beginning, Robert Gamzon and Edmond Fleg, its honorary president, wanted the EIF to embrace all secular and religious strains of Judaism. From 1929, it admitted female scouts and equal participation of boys and girls, a choice which was perceived as revolutionary at the time.

After Hitler's seizure of power, Robert Gamzon had anticipated the outbreak of another war and his fears were confirmed by the Munich Agreement of September 1938. At the beginning of 1939, the EIF and the Children's Aid Society Œuvre de secours aux enfants (OSE) began to hold joint consultations about how to evacuate young jews from French cities if the worst came to the worst. A leader of the scout movement, 30-year-old Shatta Simon (née Hirsch), was tasked by Robert Gamzon to organise children's homes away from Paris as quickly as possible. The objective was neither to set up boarding schools nor orphanages, but family-style homes where children, necessarily separated from their parents, "could continue to blossom together while waiting for the conflict to subside." Six suitable locations were found: Moissac in the Tarn-et-Garonne department; Le Ruffie and Saint Céré in the Lot Department; Villefranche-de-Rouergue and Sainte-Affrique in the department of Aveyron; and Beaulieu-sur-Dordogne in Corrèze. Armed with a list of buildings requisitioned by the authorities to shelter refugees, Shatta arrived in Moissac at the end of Summer in 1939. After the fall of France, four of the refuges closed. Only Beaulieu and Moissac, the one which Shatta Simon and her husband Bouli ran, continued to function.

== Late 1939-1940 ==
=== Outbreak of War ===
When France declared war on Germany on Sunday, September 3, 1939, the Government feared that the enemy would bombard major French cities. It issued an order to evacuate children from the cities as soon as possible. French families sent their youngest children to wet nurses or caregivers in the countryside, while schools and town halls coordinated the departure of older children. The Jewish scout movement at first mobilised only to take charge of its own members, but the evacuation plan quickly had to pivot to meet the needs of hundreds of destitute foreign Jewish families whose needs were not being met by schools or town halls, and who crowded, panicked, into the Jewish scouting movement's national headquarters in Paris asking for help to have their children evacuated from the city. Most of the youngsters whom the young EIF leaders had to transport to safety were no longer French children steeped in scouting culture, but foreign Jewish children, often from very poor refugee families, who spoke little French and whose parents had already fled with them from anti-Semitic persecution in the countries of their birth.

=== How Refugees were welcomed to the Town of Moissac ===
Senator-Mayor Roger Delthil set the tone for the entire town at the outbreak of the war by issuing a public appeal reminding residents of the national solidarity Moissac had received after the catastrophic 1930 Tarn flood, declaring it was the town's moral duty to welcome and protect refugees. He made a requisitioned building available to Shatta and Bouli Simon to establish La Maison des enfants (The Children's Home).

=== Opening of 18 Quai du Port ===
Shatta and Bouli Simon officially opened the Children's Home in Moissac on December 5, 1939, at number 18 Quai du Port (the building has since been renumbered to number 4). Shatta Simon was born Sarolta (Charlotte) Hirsch in the village of Sighișoara in Transylvania on January 29, 1910. In 1933, following the example of her brother Sigismond, she left Romania to study medicine in France. One of her first actions in Paris was to join the Jewish scout movement, where Robert Gamzon soon recognised her organisational skills. To finance her medical studies, she trained as a social worker, but her engagement in the scouting movement and the subsequent outbreak of war put an end to her ambition of becoming a doctor. Bouli Simon, whose real first name was Edouard, was the son of a family which had moved to Normandy from Lorraine and had become successful in the textile industry.

The male and female scout troop leaders who helped Shatta and Bouli to equip and run the house in Moissac were between 16 and 25 years old. Apart from scouting, nothing had prepared them to provide education and care for evacuated children. All were volunteers, and at first they believed that the hostilities would not last long. Answering the call of Robert Gamzon, Shatta, and Bouli these young people embarked on a mission true to the motto on their official uniform badges: "To do good, always ready!" But no one could foresee how long hostilities would last. No one could imagine that the majority of the children sheltered at Moissac would never again see their parents, brothers, or sisters.

Shatta also employed local people in the home: Madame Deschamps, the cook, and her husband, who, with Armand Lifchitz, was responsible for acquiring food; and a Spanish refugee couple to help with the housework, Costa and his wife Fifine.

Shatta welcomed the children into a scout home whose core principles were constantly reinforced: "Be a builder, and not an arguer or a quibbler"; "Never separate yourself from your community"; "Be always ready to do good; and "Faithfulness in small things is the foundation of everything great." Many of the children arrived speaking only German, Polish or Yiddish. Upon arrival, they were immediately told, "Ici, on parle français - Here we speak French, and only French," and that rule was enforced without exception. It was seen as a vital safety measure to have the children speaking French without an accent as quickly as possible, not only to help communication between themselves but also in case of police raids in which they would have to pass themselves off as French children.

The central address at Moissac was soon supplemented by other houses in the town, including numbers 4 and 12 of the Quai du Port. Contributions to the financing of the home came from the Central Jewish Consistory of France, the OSE, the French Jewish Scout Movement and 400 francs per child per month from American Jewish Joint Distribution Committee. But money was always tight. In later years, some of the residents remembered, "We were hungry, but we always had something to eat. During the week we were allowed 1,300 calories a day, but on the Sabbath Shatta always managed to give us 1,700 calories, on the Sabbath we ate meat."

=== The Arrivals in the Home ===
The very first group of arrivals was of young French Jewish scouts evacuated from Paris and the Alsace-Lorraine region. Then, as word of mouth spread at the end of 1939, families from recent immigrant and refugee Jewish communities, many of them completely destitute, began to flock to the EIF Secretariat at 27, avenue de Ségur in Paris to ask for help in getting their children out of Paris. Few parents could contribute to the costs of travel and subsistence for their children, but that was no obstacle. As soon as a large enough group of children was enrolled, Shatta was notified of the group's arrival in the charge of a scout leader. As the German invasion progressed, panicked Austrian, Belgian, Czechoslovak, German, Dutch, Hungarian, Luxembourger, and Polish refugee families arrived in the unoccupied southern Free Zone, and some of them also sent their children to Moissac. After October 4, 1940, children began to be saved from the internment camps where they had been locked up with their parents, the best known of which were Gurs, Rivesaltes, Le Vernet, Les Milles, Agde and Noé.

"With the agreement of the Ministry of the Interior, the OSE and the EIF installed teams of volunteer internees in the camps. They tried to do everything within their power on the ground, such as organising cultural and social spaces, schools, scout groups, daycare centres, and so on. But, above all, they sought to secure release of the children, something which remained possible until July 1942... The Jewish Scouts took on an increasingly significant role. Sometimes, the youngest children were smuggled out hidden under a coat to deceive the guards. Elsewhere, the scouts helped olhildren crawl under the barbed wire to freedom. Ninon Haït-Weyl, Ruth Lambert, Théo Bernheim, and Shatta's sister, Beugie, as well as David Donoff and other Scout leaders, drew upon all their talents and courage to rescue children from these “deportation holding centres.” Thanks to what may have been an intentional oversight by the Perpignan prefecture, some teenagers over the age of fifteen were released… Shatta obtained an authorisation from the departmental prefect and took in about fifty interned children… These foreign Jewish children arriving in Moissac had endured inhuman hardships: persecution, exile, and, for some, arrest, deportation and the murder of their parents, brothers, and sisters. The youngest among them did not even know their own names, their places of birth, or the occupations of the parents from whom they had received no news."

Other groups also helped to save children from the camps, among them the Quakers. The United States maintained diplomatic relations with Vichy France until the German army invaded the previously unoccupied Free Zone in November 1942. During that time, American Quaker delegates were legally allowed to enter the camps to provide food and other material relief such as clothes, shoes and blankets. They also put pressure on the Vichy collaborationist regime to release children. Once extracted, the children were placed in a broad network of rescue homes. The EIF home at Moissac served as one of the primary hubs for this network. After December 11, 1941, when Nazi Germany had declared war on the United States, the Quakers had shifted their work to clandestine cooperation with Jewish resistance movements.

=== Internal Organisation ===
In a conference given in Paris in 2006, Catherine Lewertowski, described the running of the Home. The children, at any onetime, could number up to 180 in the main house and its annexes. What could have been a grim refugee shelter was purposely fashioned by Shatta and Bouli to become a self-governing community where children traumatised by exile or deportation and loss of their parents could find safety, dignity, and a sense of family through study, respect for tradition, and play while continuing to live openly as Jews despite the surrounding persecution.

Welcoming children arriving from across Europe, often crying and speaking no French, Shatta Simon refused to let the home sink into despair or victimhood. Her guiding principle was simple: "Tragedy is not an option, we choose life.” She immediately anchored new arrivals in a protective normality, telling them immediately, “Now, put down your suitcase, and then you'll get washed and you'll eat with your scout patrol, and tomorrow you will go to school. After that, we'll see." Her primary operational rule for the scout patrol leaders was that no child was ever to be left alone to brood or feel abandoned.

Daily and weekly routines were maintained around hygiene, meals, education, and spiritual life, with a continual emphasis on how to prepare the children how to act in the case of Vichy police raids. Scouting was not an extracurricular activity at Moissac; it was the way of life. The entire house was structured according to the Jewish Scouts patrol system and age groups. The cub scouts, aged from 6-12, attended local primary schools. The scouts, aged 12-16 attended local secondary schools or served apprenticeships with tradespeople in the town, and the senior boy and girl scouts were trained in the advanced vocational workshops or worked on the nearby Charry farm school. Dormitories were partitioned into distinct patrol quarters that the children decorated themselves. Each patrol elected its own leader and assumed collective responsibility for its sleeping and living space, daily chores, and its younger members. The daily routine was to be up by 7 o'clock, then to do morning exercises and gymnastics in the fresh air, down by the river bank whenever possible. This was followed by a morning wash, bed-making, and doing collective chores such as peeling stones of potatoes for more than a hundred young mouths.

After that, the younger children marched in orderly rows across the Napoléon bridge to their schools in the town or to their assigned vocational training workshops. Every afternoon during the coffee break, the elder scouts gathered for a "Council of Leaders" to discuss educational progress and housekeeping matters.

The highlight of the week was Shabbat, which was organised by Shatta as a conscious act of cultural resistance through tradition and celebration. On Friday afternoon, the children took hot baths and dressed in clean white shirts for the boys and pleated skirts for the girls. They walked through the streets of Moissac to the public bathhouse, singing Hebrew and scout songs out loud in broad daylight while the local townspeople benevolently looked on. Back at the home, Shatta draped tables with white sheets and arranged Star of David centrepieces made from hawthorn and wildflowers gathered by the girls. As evening fell, candles were lit, blessings were recited, and Shabbat songs echoed throughout the courtyard. A much-loved moment, remembered by all the former residents came at the end of the Friday night services, when, at the end of prayers,, Madame Deschamps ("la mère Desche," as she was fondly known), would shout out the words, "Les nouilles! – The noodles!" from the kitchen, signalling that it was time to drop the pasta for the evening meal into boiling water.

"Finally," wrote François Boulet, explaining the spiritual power of the Home, "we must return to the religious factor in the moral success of the refuge… Optimistic and joyful Judaism created ‘the Friday miracle’ in Moissac, the ‘Oneg Shabbat’: songs, games, acted-out biblical scenes, stories of the people of Israel… Whilst the local population may not have been able to appreciate the spiritual success, particularly in a town marked by radical secularism and Freemasonry, they could nevertheless appreciate the moral success of a refuge devoid of misconduct, which did not use the black market or create other problems. In any case, the Jewish festivals were celebrated right out on the streets of Moissac without criticism from the townspeople, which, in itself, was quite exceptional in both ‘free’ and occupied France.

Catherine Lewertowski, who has spent much time talking to former residents of the home, has heard them say, decades later, that although many of them did not remain strictly religious as adults, every single one of them still laid a clean white tablecloth on Friday evening in memory of Moissac.

Music, Song, and Play to Counter the Doldrums

To keep the children cheerful, Shatta and the scout leadership counted heavily on music and choral singing, led by 16-year-old scout leader Henri Milstein (who received transcribed scores from Léo Cohn). The choir practice gave the children a song for every occasion, marching songs, Shabbat hymns, campfire tunes, and festive melodies.

Particular attention was also paid to giving the children occasions for play. In winter 1941, the home organized massive snowball fights and children built snowmen. Campfires, theatrical skits, games, and group outings were activities regularly practiced to invoke the healing power of the group, and to ensure that moments of grief were borne collectively rather than in isolation. Survivor and filmmaker Nicolas Ribowski, who made the film "J'avais oublié: la maison des Justes de Moissac - "I had Forgotten: The House of the Righteous of Moissac," reflected later that these daily educational, physical, and spiritual activities did not merely keep him and his comrades alive. They repaired their damaged spirits and built a lifelong "reserve of courage."

=== The Scout Network in the Town ===
François Boulet has also written:

"The young Scouts knew "the people of Moissac”: the Catholic Scouts, farmers, tradespeople, and local dignitaries; the mayor of Moissac, Dr. Louis Moles, who treated sick children (in the home) until the Liberation; at the townhall itself, Manuel Paul Darrac, the secretary, along with his assistant Alice Pelous, and an employee named Henriette Ducom; Lieutenant Lantier of the Gendarmerie; Madame Deschamps, the cook, nicknamed “Mother Desche”; the elementary and middle schools, where speaking French well became essential for the group’s integration; three boarders took shorthand and typing classes at the Genyer School, run by nuns of the Congregation of the Mercies, and the mother superior granted the boarders permission to skip classes on Saturdays due to Shabbat; let us not forget Mr. Chaudron, a locksmith, who taught (his craft) to Jewish children; likewise, Mr. Dreuil, a cabinetmaker from Moissac; Mr. Roger, a greengrocer; Jean Gainard, a coal and wood merchant, who offered his identification papers (to Henri Wahl, a leader of the Jewish Resistance); and Louis Légère, a shoemaker, who was close to the Scouting movement."

== Scout Leadership, Key Staff, and Educators of the Moissac Network ==
Name & Alias / Codename	EIF Role / Position at Moissac	Wartime Rescue, Educational & Resistance Contribution	Post-War Career & Historical Legacy
Léo Cohn	Religious Educator & Scout Chaplain	Composed scout songs, directed Jewish studies, and provided spiritual guidance at Moissac and the Lautrec farm school. Manufactured religious calendars and texts in hiding.	Arrested while transporting young people to the Spanish border in May 1944; deported to Auschwitz/Görlitz, where he perished shortly before liberation.
Herta-Cohn Bendit	German lawyer and refugee.	Took refuge with son Gabriel in Moissac in 1942, helped with administrative matters in the Home, and worked to organise safehouse placements (planques) for the children.	Managed the OSE children's home in Cailly-sur-Eure, France, and then, from 1949, took over the economic management of the Jewish Maimonide high school in Boulogne-Billancourt. Mother of Gabriel and Daniel Cohn-Bendit.
Robert Gamzon ("Beaver")	Founder & National Commissioner of the EIF	Ideological founder of Jewish scouting in France; oversaw the EIF's transition to clandestinity and founded the armed Jewish Maquis (Compagnie Marc Haguenau) in the Montagne Noire.	Led the liberation of Castres in August 1944; emigrated to Israel in 1949 and died by drowning there in 1961.
Ninon Haït-Weyl ("Nicole Harcourt")	Social Worker & Ecclesiastical Liaison	Managed central social services for La Sixième; liaised with Church leaders (including Bishop Pierre-Marie Théas of Montauban) to secure baptismal templates, official stamps, and convent safehouses.	Survived the war; remained active in international Jewish social services and survivor support networks.
Elisabeth "Bugie" Hirsch	Administrator, Scout Leader (Cheftaine), & Courier	Sister of Shatta Simon; handled secretarial operations at Quai du Port, acted as a courier for La Sixième, and subsequently organized Pyrenean border smuggling routes guiding youth to Spain.	Survived the war and remained dedicated to youth work and family history documentation; key witness for Moissac commemorations.
Dr. Sigismond "Djigo" Hirsch	Medical Director & Regional Sector Chief	Brother of Shatta Simon; treated the children's health, built protective capital by treating local gendarmes for free, and directed the Auvillar security sector (Lissac farm), placing over 100 youth with local farmers, to many of whom he had provided medical care.	Survived arrest and internment at Buchenwald; returned to practice medicine and advocate for Holocaust memory until his death in 1990.
Liliane Klein-Lieber ("Luciole")	EIFCoordinator	Following the devastating Free Zone round-ups of August 26, 1942, Liliane Klein-Lieber was dispatched directly to Moissac by EIF leadership to coordinate emergency social work and logistics for the underground rescue wing, La Sixième (The Sixth).	Survived the war, became very active in social and women's scouting causes. Awarded the Legion of Honour. Was a delegate of the National Council of French Women.
Simon Lévitte	Senior Educational Director & Forgery Pioneer	Organized the initial vocational workshops at 18 Quai du Port; set up the home’s first clandestine forgery lab on the third floor before moving to Grenoble to direct UGIF/EIF youth leadership training.	Major post-war educator and community leader; founded the Centre Éducatif d'Israël in Paris and promoted Jewish educational renewal in France and Israel.
Georges Lévitte	Intellectual & Pedagogical Educator	Brother of Simon Lévitte; shaped the cultural, philosophical, and Jewish spiritual curriculum at Moissac, teaching Hebrew, history, and literature to children and staff.	Renowned French-Jewish scholar, translator, and editor; co-directed the Alliance Israélite Universelle publications and translated major Jewish philosophical texts.
Denise Lévy ("Belette" / alias "Denise Laurens")	National Liaison & Placement Coordinator	Supervised the network of young female couriers (convoyeuses); coordinated monthly distribution of funds, bleached ration cards, and medical care to hidden children across the Southern Zone.	Survived the occupation; recognized as a crucial organizer of the EIF underground network.
Georges Loinger	National Athletic Director (EIF / OSE) & Swiss Border Escape Chief	Organised physical training across EIF homes including Moissac; established the Annemasse escape line (Réseau Garel). Personally guided the first major cohort of Moissac youth across the Swiss border in spring 1943, saving over 350 children.	President of the Anciens de la Résistance Juive de France (ARJF); awarded the Commandeur de la Légion d'Honneur; passed away in 2018 at the age of 108.
Marcel Marceau (born Marcel Mangel)	1923–2007 (Strasbourg)	EIF scout leader and resister (cousin of Georges Loinger). Frequented the Moissac home starting in 1942, entertaining children, teaching mime as a communication tool for escaping in silence, and assisting escape lines.	Internationally acclaimed mime artist ("Bip the Clown") and cultural icon; veteran of the French Resistance.
Henri Milstein	Born ~1926	Recruited as a 16-year-old scout leader at Moissac; appointed choir director (chef de chorale) by Shatta Simon to build morale and psychological resilience.	Reunited Moissac alumni choir in post-war commemorations to preserve the home's musical heritage.
Isaac Pougatch ("Poug"), Nina Gourfinkel & Juliette Pary	Directors of the Charry Agricultural Farm School	Managed the 10-hectare EIF farm school at Charry (near Moissac), combining rigorous agricultural apprenticeship with Hebrew studies, music, and spiritual grounding for refugee teenagers.	Prominent author, educator, and advocate for Jewish folk culture and youth education in post-war France.
Lazare Prajs (Greyhound)	Although aged only 18, when the Home was opened he became the Senior Troop Leader, "Le Grand Chef."	He evacuated children from the home in 1943, in the time of "planquing" and made fake identity papers for them. He later recalled how the young secretary at the town hall of Montboucher, near Bourganeuf, had reacted when he discovered that young Jews were camping nearby and were in danger of arrest. "He made everything he had available to us: the town hall stamp, ID cards... I looked for this guy after the war, but I couldn't find him. A Righteous. I told him everything. He just opened the doors of the cabinet in his office and he gave me everything.”	At the beginning of 1944 he was obliged to flee to Israel to avoid being caught. He taught literature at the University of Tel-Aviv and died in 2008.
Léon Rosen	Senior scout.	He worked closely with the Garel Network and the OSE. For the Moissac Home during the "planquing," he moved children from camp to camp and provided them with false identities, helping them to remember their "new" names in order to save them from deportation	After Moissac, he fought in the Free French Forces and after the Libération taught history at the Alsatian School in Paris. In 1974, he was one of the initiators of the first major efforts to collect, secure, and repatriate Jewish archives and Resistance documents scattered abroad.
Charlotte "Shatta" Simon (née Hirsch)	Founder, Co-Director & Mother Figure of La Maison des enfants	Co-founded the home in 1939; designed the "Three Circles" emergency safety protocol. Maintained morale, scouting routines, and psychological resilience for ~500 children; directed the 1943 emergency dispersal (le planquing).	Continued directing post-war children's homes in Moissac (Hôtel Moulin) and Laversine (Oise) until 1968. Honored alongside Bouli across France as a central figure of Jewish rescue.
Édouard "Bouli" Simon	Co-Director & House Father	Managed daily logistics, negotiations with local authorities, food supply lines, and agricultural training. Coordinated clandestine safehouse placements with La Sixième.	Co-directed post-war rehabilitation centres for child Holocaust survivors; active leader in French scouting and Jewish community reconstruction.
Henri Wahl ("Chamois" / alias "Jean Gainard")	Operational Rescue & Forgery Director (La Sixième)	Managed nationwide logistics for document forgery and safehouse networks. Traveled across France under the identity of Moissac coal merchant Jean Gainard to distribute false papers and rescue youngsters.	Survived the war; wrote key early historical accounts documenting the clandestine operations of La Sixième and the EIF.

== 1941-November 1942 ==
=== Official Status ===
When the Home opened at 18 Quai du Port on December 5, 1939, it was established as a temporary evacuation shelter and family-style children's home (maison d'enfants) under the auspices of the Éclaireurs Israélites de France (EIF), to accommodate children evacuated from major cities like Paris and Strasbourg to protect them from potential aerial bombardments.

By March 1941, the Jewish Scout movement had managed to get the Home recognised by the Vichy collaborationist regime as a state-recognized vocational training centre. This strategic official recognition was sought by the EIF leadership for three main reasons:

- It would allow them to protect foreign and stateless Jewish teenagers, who would otherwise be targeted for internment or forced labour battalions. Attendance at a recognised apprentice training centre legally classified these older youngsters as students, giving them administrative protection.
- The accreditation would allow the home to hire Jewish academics, engineers, scientists, and lawyers who had been stripped of their right to exercise their professions by Vichy’s anti-Semitic statutes of 1940, and allow them to have jobs as workshop directors and educators.
- It would allow them to set up structured technical workshops for electricity, metallurgy, carpentry, bookbinding, tailoring, dressmaking, and dental prosthetics, in addition to the Charry farm school for agricultural training.

Scouting activities and attendance at the town’s schools would continue to remain the norm for the younger children.

=== Agricultural Expansion to Charry (March 1941) ===
Robert Gamzon was interested in rural work camps for future pioneers: “To work the land is to work on oneself,” he often said. In March 1941, a farm cum agricultural school was started by the EIF on the rural estate of Charry at Viarose, about five kilometres from Moissac. The estate had been abandoned for a quarter of a century. An initial group of 11 young Jews, mostly from Central Europe (seven young men and four young women) grew to 15 men and 10 women by July 1942, and during that time they reclaimed 25 acres of land at Charry for agricultural use.

The Charry farm was managed from 1941 to late 1942 by Juliette Pary and her husband Isaac Pougatch, both of whom had previously worked at the Moissac children's home. In an article about Isaac Pougatch, Samuel Boussion described Charry as a "...kibbutz-like school farm [...] which contributed to the development of a pioneer ideal based on manual and agricultural labour, as well as religious, cultural, and political Zionism..."

When Vichy inspectors, prefects, or social service officials visited Charry, they did not see the "subversive" urban elements they had sometimes expected to see. Instead, they observed orderly, disciplined, and hard-working youths singing scout songs and doing manual labour. "Paradoxically," wrote François Boulet, "it was the war and the regime that fostered this 'return to the land.' For the Vichy government, these rural Scout groups were implementing a policy (which they encouraged) aimed at providing vocational guidance for young people and encouraging a return to the land; as such, they received government subsidies until 1942 as vocational training centres."

In addition to the farm at Charry, Shatta managed to get an abandoned 3/4 acre site not far from the Home at Quai du Port. She set ten of the youngsters there to work to turn it into a vegetable farming operation.

=== The Two Mayors of Moissac ===
At the outbreak of the war in 1939, when Roger Delthil famously established Moissac’s culture of hospitality by appealing to residents to welcome all refugees, reminding them of the moral debt the town owed for the national aid it received after the catastrophic 1930 Tarn flood, he had been the Radical Party mayor of Moissac since 1925. After the German attack of May 10, 1940, and the ensuing exodus of people from Paris, the North of France and Belgium, at least 16,000 refugees were housed in Moissac for at least two months. The population of the town tripled, from 8,200 people to more than 24,000. Following the armistice signed between Philippe Pétain and the Nazis towards the end of June, 1940, the Vichy regime systematically abolished elected municipal councils and replaced their elected mayors, especially if they were left-leaning or openly republican like Delthil, with state-appointed mayors. In March, 1941, Dr. Louis Moles was appointed to replace Roger Delthil as mayor of Moissac, a post he held until the Liberation, at which time Roger Delthil was reinstated as mayor.

In spite of being appointed by the Vichy regime, Dr. Moles did not enforce anti-Semitic directives against the children's home. Instead, he continued in the same vein as Roger Delthil and became a protector of both the Home and the broader refugee community.

Both Delthil and Moles were practicing doctors. Throughout his tenure as mayor, Dr. Moles served as the official general practitioner (médecin attitré) for the Children’s Home. He regularly visited the houses at the Quai du Port to examine the children, treat illnesses, and oversee sanitary conditions. His mayorship permitted him to become a "vital administrative protector" for Shatta and Bouli Simon, inasmuch as he could provide legal cover for the home, allowing it to function, unperturbed, under the legal status of an official youth scouting and apprentice training centre (centre de formation professionnelle). Dr. Moles also permitted members of his municipal staff, specifically Town Clerk Manuel Darrac, Darrac's assistant Alice Pelous, and another town hall employee, Henriette Ducom, to actively undermine orders from the Vichy regime. Under Moles's administration, these town hall officials systematically provided authentic municipal seals, blank forms, false residence permits, and official food ration cards (tickets d'alimentation) to Jewish Scout leaders and the fake identity paper manufacturers of the underground "Sixth" resistance movement, which organised and coordinated the "planquing" of the children among local familes, schools and religious institutions. Dr. Moles also assisted Shatta Simon, the home's director, in navigating Vichy bureaucracy to secure food ration allocations during the severe wartime shortages.

=== The Summer 1942 Turning Point ===
The Vél d'Hiv mass round-up of Jews in the Paris region by the Vichy police force took place on July 16 and 17, 1942. The people arrested were deported to Nazi Germany. On August 25, 1942, EIF leader Robert Gamzon ("Castor") was tipped off by Gilbert Lesage, a senior official in the Vichy social services, that police round-ups targeting foreign Jews across the so-called Free Zone were scheduled for dawn the following day. The tip-off also contained the information that all the Austrian, German and Russian children, whatever their age, were to be arrested. The Jewish Scout leaders at Moissac had already been feeling the urgency of planning for the eventuality of such a raid on the Home. For the summer, the children had been sent to camp in the area of Bourganeuf in the Creuse department. Castor immediately raised a general alarm among the Scout leaders. Henri Wahl was given the order to warn Henri Milstein, who was supervising the 200 youngsters at the camp at Bourganeuf, of the absolute danger for the young people aged 15 and over, and they were immediately sent to hide in the forests. Shatta Simon and the other scout leaders immediately divided the younger children into small, mobile groups known as "flying camps," (camps volants), that continually moved through the countryside and wooded areas to avoid detection. The youngsters at the Charry farm were also warned.

"The rescue operation that they planned would not have been possible without the courage of the “Righteous,” who were willing to risk their lives to save those who could still be saved. Righteous individuals from the town of Moissac and its surroundings. But also Righteous individuals in Vichy, such as Gilbert Lesage, who had been an ally since the start of the war. As director of the Social Services for Foreigners in Vichy, he informed Gamzon of the laws and decrees being drafted, as well as of the upcoming round-ups."

When the Vichy police descended upon the Home at 18, Quai du Port on August 26, 1942, they only found Shatta. When she opened the door, the police commissioner gave her the names of the "illegal" children he was there to arrest. Shatta said that the children were away for the time being, and he didn't seem surprised to hear this. When he asked for the travel documents that had authorised the trip, and showed the destination, Shatta apologised and said that she had "mislaid them." The commissioner did not press the issue, and the police wagons left the home empty. However, there were other foreign Jewish people living in Moissac at that time, not connected with the Home, and four adults were arrested.

When one of the leaders, Léon Rosen, finally hazarded a visit to Moissac from the flying camps, he came back with the news that they would have to continue to hide. Leon helped the children with false papers, for which they needed to memorise false names and new pasts. They were, unknowingly, developing and experimenting methods that would be used months later to save the smaller children, in the dispersal and hiding process that became known as "planquing." Lazare Prajs, another of the leaders of the group, whose scout name was "Lévrier - Greyhound," remembered afterwards, how the young secretary of the mayor of Montboucher, near Bourganeuf, had reacted when he discovered that young Jews were camping nearby and were in danger of arrest. "“He made everything he had available to us: the town hall stamp, ID cards... I looked for this guy after the war, but I couldn't find him. A Righteous. I told him everything. He just opened the doors of the cabinet in his office and he gave me everything.”

=== A Change of Status for the Jewish Scouts and the Creation of "The Sixth" ===
Between March and October 1942, the Jewish Scout Movement was placed under the authority of the General Union of French Jews (UGIF - Union générale des israélites de France), created in December 1941 to act as the governing body for all Jews in France. It was modelled on the Judenräte (Jewish councils) set up by the Nazis in towns and ghettos in occupied Eastern Europe. In the beginning, the UGIF provided welfare, soup kitchens, and some homes to shelter children, but it was soon used by the Vichy regime and the Nazis to catalogue, isolate, and control the Jewish population. In 1943 and 1944, the Gestapo raided UGIF orphanages and centres, such as the Lamarck Street centre in Paris (in July 1944), deporting hundreds of children and staff to extermination camps like Auschwitz.

Rather than completely disbanding when faced with the obligation to accept UGIF control, the scout leaders, spearheaded by the movement's founder, Robert Gamzon (scout name "Castor - Beaver"), agreed to officially absorb their personnel into the southern branch of the UGIF (UGIF-Sud). The EIF became the Fourth Section of the UGIF’s Youth Directorate, tasked legally with overseeing Jewish youth welfare, community centers, and rural farming schools. Crucially, Gamzon secured a seat on the central board of UGIF-Sud, positioning himself to build a protective shield over the scouts.

Thus, the Jewish Scout Movement managed to become one of the UGIF’s departments responsible for social welfare, while its purely “scouting” activities remained under the jurisdiction of the French Scouting movement. Under the legal umbrella of carrying out its regime-approved activities, the scout movement created a clandestine resistance movement named La Sixième ("The Sixth"). The name itself, The Sixth, was an insider code: officially, the team operated on paper as the 6th Division of the Youth Directorate (the Service Social des Jeunes or Youth Social Service) inside the UGIF. But, unofficially, "The Sixth" served as a cover for its members clandestine activities, using the UGIF budget legally to procure vehicles and travel permits to move freely across France, to transport children and scope out new hiding places.

In August 1942, when mass round-ups of foreign Jews spread across the "unoccupied" Free Zone, the EIF leadership realised that absolute legality could now prove a death sentence. It was then, that under the leadership of Marc Haguenau (scout name Colombe - Dove), that the scouts ramped up the activities of "The Sixth". Among other activities, at 18, Quai du Port, the scouts set up a workshop to produce forged documents: identity cards, ration cards, passports, and baptismal certificates. On January 5, 1943, the Commissariat for Jewish Affairs ordered the effective dissolution of the Jewish Scout Movement, however, its social, educational, and agricultural activities continued until October.

By the winter of 1943, the façade of the UGIF "umbrella" could no longer protect the scouts. The Germans had fully occupied the south, and the Gestapo began aggressively raiding UGIF homes. The EIF completely dropped its legal cover and dissolved its youth sections, fully devoting The Sixth to the armed resistance. Tragically, Marc Haguenau was captured by the Gestapo in 1944 and committed suicide to avoid breaking under torture. In his honour, the remaining scouts formed an armed guerrilla cell called the Marc Haguenau Company, which joined the Jewish Fighting Organisation, the "Organisation Juive de Combat" which played a full part in the armed liberation of southwestern France and, most notably, under the command of Robert Gamzon, liberated the City of Castres from the Germans on August 20-21, 1944. Gamzon, at the head of 350 Jewish fighters, the core of whom were former scouts, accepted the surrender of 4,000 German soldiers.

== November 1942-Late 1943 ==
The next attempted round-up carried out by French authorities against the home targeted the Charry farm on February 22, 1943. But, once again, the police commissioner apparently left empty-handed. At the police station in Moissac, the policeman André Capdordy tasked with the surveillance of "Foreigners and Jews" proved to be a source of protection for refugees. He was constantly in contact with Shatta Simon, and warned her about coming round-ups. He also helped Manuel Darrac and Alice Pelous in supplying Shatta with false papers for the children. In 1943, he was in contact with the members of the Resistance in Moissac and with the clandestine resistance fighters in the maquis.

=== German Occupation of the Free Zone ===
The Germans took control of the Free Zone in southern France on November 11, 1942. On January 5, 1943, the collaborationist Commissariat for Jewish Affairs ordered the effective dissolution of the Jewish Scout Movement, but their educational, and agricultural activities continued until October of that year. The demarcation line between the free zone and the occupied zone was officially abolished on March 1, 1943, and the former Free Zone became known as the Southern Zone. After that date, round-ups became more frequent. The young people at 18 Quai du Port and its annexes managed to escape several of them. In the Spring of 1943, in an official letter to his colleague in the Aveyron department, François Marion, the Prefect (the highest official government representative) for the area around Moissac obtained an authorisation for Shatta Simon to take 160 children on a camping holiday in the Aveyron for two months, from August 5 to the end of September. When the children had to leave the home for short periods outside those dates, under Shatta's hands-on leadership, they had to stay constantly on the move. During one period of five days forced absence from Moissac, in what Shatta called "des camps volants - flying camps," they put up and took down their tents in a new camp every day. But the risks were mounting. It became clear to the Jewish Scout leadership that it would be suicidal not to close the house and disperse the children.

== October-November 1943 ==
=== Le "Planquing" - Going into Hiding ===
In October, 1943, an urgent tip-off from local police officer André Capdordy about an imminent raid by the German military police (and not the Vichy police force, this time) triggered an emergency evacuation, after which the scouts made a definitive decision to close the home. Before it shut down in November, 1943, "A very solemn-looking Bouli Simon, Shatta's husband, stood up in front of the last children left in the Home, asked for silence and announced that they were going to have to leave the home and be dispersed to different locations. The youngsters were stunned by the news. It was their last Shabbat together, the last Shabbat of October 1943. 'No matter what happens, you will never be alone,' Bouli reassured the children. 'And in any case, you must all be back here for the first Shabbat after the Liberation. And those who are late for the start of the service had better watch out!'”

The closing of the home at 18, Quai du Port did not mean the end of Shatta and Bouli Simon's work with the children. It marked the beginning of a new phase, which the scout leaders describe as "planquing," an anglicisation of the French word to hide, "se planquer."

=== The "Three Circles" ===
In a conversation with Catherine Lewortowski, Shatta Simon described how the concept of the three circles she had developed worked at the most basic level: the case of an unexpected raid on the Home, in which the first circle meant that for every child, an emergency hiding location around Moissac had to have been arranged in advance, such as a local farmer who had agreed to shelter a child or children; the Second Circle, was an alternative contact or host family if the first host was unavailable for any reason; and, if the second host also could not take them in, they had to resort to the Third Circle, which was that they had to use their scouting training and manage on their own.

But the scouts always had a longer term "three circle" plan, which was put into effect in the last days of the Home at 18 Quai du Port at the end of October, 1943. Depending on their circumstances, the children were dispersed through three channels. The first one was with Christian families under false identities, the second in institutions such as boarding schools (known in France as "internats") and the third, for those most at risk, for example those who spoke with very strong foreign accents, clandestine accompaniment to Switzerland or Spain. From October 23, 1943, until the Liberation, young male and female scout leaders provided support for the children placed with families or institutions in these arrangements, ensuring that each one of them was visited at least once a month and provided with clothes or whatever other necessary items could not be supplied by the families or institutions. This network operated according to a system of small, tightly compartmentalized groups, but in such a way that no one would “feel abandoned.” The rural work camps were not permanently disbanded until March 1944.

Shatta and Bouli Simon were themselves "planqués", while continuing to manage the clandestine network and visit the children. Shatta took on the identity of Alice Pelous, a Moissac town hall employee.

== 1944-1950s ==
=== The Liberation ===
The message from Bouli had been clear. All the children had been ordered to get together for the first Shabbat after the Liberation in Moissac.

“That Friday evening, we arrived in Moissac from all corners of France, by bus, by train, or by hitchhiking, from wherever we had been hidden. Not a single child missed the appointment. But, alas, many of those who had worked heroically to save us were missing. They had given their lives for us, to offer us a world of safety and tenderness instead of the world of terror," wrote Laure Schindler-Levine.

Ida Akerman-Tieder said in an interview with the Jerusalem Post in 2019, “After the war, our parents never returned from deportation. All the children who were hidden, away from their families and deprived of their identities and familiar surroundings, came back to Moissac....

The author of the newspaper article continued, "It was a time when returning deportees were warmly welcomed and perceived as heroes if they had been resistance fighters. It was then that Ida Tieder felt as if they were the 'children of silence,' those nobody ever spoke about even though they had made it through the war without their parents. In the aftermath of the war Moissac was a place that enabled children to renew their lives. It also became a sort of cultural and intellectual center where many Jewish intellectuals were invited to lecture on Jewish philosophy. The Jewish Scouts’ children’s home was the starting point of a postwar Jewish identity based on Torah. This atmosphere, which she enjoyed until the age of 18, helped Akerman-Tieder begin again. While studying, she also taught school children at Moissac, but adapting to daily life was still difficult without parents."

=== Post-War Relocation: The Hotel Moulin ===
After the war, the original house at 18 Quai du Port, even with its annexes, was not large enough to accommodate the scout children who had returned to Moissac, and whose numbers had been augmented by other children and orphans freed from extermination camps. The total number in Shatta and Bouli's immediate care rose to 300. The municipality of Moissac provided the Jewish scouts with a new home in the former mill, the "Grand Moulin," which had been converted into a hotel (the Hotel Moulin). The dedicated vocational apprenticeship and training centre took on a new life. The Hotel Moulin was a palace compared to number 18, Quai du Port, with one whole floor for the girls, another for the boys and a third for the directors.

=== 1951: The Château of Laversine ===
In October 1951, Shatta, her team, and the children relocated to the OSE-sponsored home at the Castle of Laversine in the Oise department in northern France. However, administrative closeout and vocational transition activities in Moissac extended until 1953. Shatta and Bouli continued their life's work there with Jewish and non-Jewish children, facing other types of difficulty from those at Moissac, until 1993, when Bouli passed away and Shatta retired. The home at the Château de Laversine is now named the Maison d'enfants Shatta-et-Bouli-Simon in their honour.

== Some of the Children Who Stayed at the Home ==
In his book Moissac 1939-1945, Cité de Justes, François Boulet wrote,, "The number of children who passed through this home in Moissac between 1940 and 1944 is estimated at 500, including both departures and arrivals. This figure may be slightly overestimated, although it seems plausible; the total of 500 includes the children’s families as well as the group leaders." Catherine Lewertowski gives the same number, and adds, "They were between 2 and 18 years old. Some stayed for only a few days, others for a number of years. All of them were saved. They all escaped deportation, except for one who, taken away by his parents, died with them in the camps."

The two tables below show the variety of backgrounds from which the children came to Moissac, and how they fared after the war.

=== Children of Parents who had made their Own Way to France ===
Name	Year of Birth / Origin	Wartime Experience & Rescue at Moissac	Post-War Career & Historical Legacy
Freddy Arom (Freddy Simha)	1930, (Germany, to a family of Galician origin.)	After escaping from the Rivesaltes internment camp, Freddy and his brother were taken to the Home in Moissac.	In June 1944, Freddy went to Palestine. He went back to France in 1951 to complete his musical studies.
Gabriel Cohn-Bendit	1936 (Paris)	Arrived at the home with his mother, Herta-Cohn Bendit, stayed in the infants' quarters; during "planquing" hidden under false papers (Jean Collet) with local host families (Collet and Kauffmann).	Became a lifelong militant in France for alternative schooling for vulnerable young people.
Maurice Daar (Moyshe)	1925, (Galicia)	The OSE and the EIF helped Moyshe to escape from the Agde internment camp. He stayed in Moissac for nearly two years and helped his mother to escape from Rivesaltes.	Escaped to Switzerland and became a psychiatrist.
Henri, Daniel & Suzette Fajnzang	1928, 1929, 1930 (Antwerp)	Entrusted to Moissac in May 1941 after facing anti-Semitic harassment at school in Lizac; hidden in 1943 in Beaumont-de-Lomagne by teachers Jean-Marie and Jeanne Arquié.	Survived the war; older brother Jules survived concentration camp death marches, while brother Joseph served in the armed Resistance.
Jean-Claude Grumberg	1939 (Paris)	Brought to Moissac in 1943 as a traumatized three-year-old boy alongside his seven-year-old brother, Maxime, after his father was arrested and deported.	Celebrated French playwright, screenwriter, and author; recipient of multiple Molière Awards. Returned to Moissac in 2014 to retrace his childhood.
Bernard Kalikstein (Calcif)	1927 (Paris, to a family of Polish origin.)	Caught up in the Vel d’Hiv round-up of 1942. Sent by his family to Moissac. Joined the Resistance and participated in the Liberation of Castres and Mazamet. Incorporated into the Army of de Lattre de Tassigny.	After demobilisation, stayed in Moissac for five years. Larter, became chief electrician at the Théâtre de l’Étoile in Paris.
Serge Klarsfeld	1935 (Bucharest)	Sheltered at Moissac for five weeks in June 1940 during the exodus from Paris before moving to Masgelier; his father was later deported to Auschwitz.	World-renowned historian, lawyer, and Nazi hunter; co-founder of Fils et Filles des Déportés Juifs de France (FFDJF).
Henny Lehrmann	1927 (Stuttgart)	Freed from the Rivesaltes camp by the OSE and the EIF, she went to Moissac in 1944 and stayed there for a number of years.	Lived in Paris.
Itzhak Michaeli (Mika)	1922 (Poland)	A member of the Hashomer Hatzair youth movement, he arrived at Moissac in June 1940. After being arrested and interned in the Rivesaltes camp, he escaped and became an educator at the Montintin home, where he helped in the dispersal of the children, before joining Georges Lévitte’s School of the Prophets.	Emigrated to Israel, where he held down important positions in the Secret Service and the Ministry of Foreign Affairs.
Nicolas Ribowski	1939 (Paris)	Hidden at Moissac alongside his brother David and sister Bella after their parents were arrested and murdered in Auschwitz.	Prominent French film and television director; directed the documentary J'avais oublié : la maison des Justes de Moissac (2005) and serves as Vice-President of the memory association.
Laure Schindler-Levine	1927 (Berlin)	Saved from the Gurs internment camp in May, 1941, by Elisabeth Hirsch. After the experience of “planquing,” until the end of the War, Laure returned to the Home to finish her secondary education.	Emigrated to Israel in 1953 and then to the United States where she became a librarian. She published a memoir of her childhood and the time spent at Moissac, in French, under the title L'Impossible au revoir. L'enfance de l'un des derniers "maillons de la chaîne" 1939-1945.
Edith Schwalb (Gelbart)	1932 (Vienna)	Sent to Moissac in 1941 after fleeing Austria and Belgium; hidden during the late 1943 planquing under a false identity.	Subject of Kathy Kacer's award-winning Holocaust remembrance book Hiding Edith (2006); settled in Canada.
Jean-Claude Simon	1939 (Paris)	Son of Shatta and Bouli. Lived at the Home until 1943. During the dispersal, at first taken in by the Ginisty family; and then placed in the care of Alice & Édouard Lebreil.	Returned to Moissac after the Libération; stayed the Hôtel Moulin; completed medical studies; distinguished career as a cardiologist in Paris; gave testimony for Yad Vashem Righteous ceremonies; serves as President of the Moissac, ville de Justes oubliée association.
Dr. Ida Akerman-Tieder	1927 (Berlin)	Joined her siblings Sarah and Martin at Moissac after their parents were deported in August 1942; remained at the home until age 18.	Respected Paris pediatrician and psychoanalyst; author of And You Shall Tell Your Children; immigrated to Israel in 1990.
Sarah Kaminsky (née Tieder)	1926 (Berlin)	Sheltered at Moissac; transferred in 1943 by La Sixième to Lamagistère under false identity with Édouard & Alice Lebreil, where she passed her exams in June 1944.	Primary witness whose testimony secured Yad Vashem Righteous recognition for the Lebreil family in 2006.

==== Marianne Cohn ====
Marianne Cohn (known as Marianne Colin in the Resistance movement) was born in Mannheim, Germany, in 1922. Her family emigrated to Spain in 1934 and to France in 1939. Her parents were interned in the Gurs Internment Camp, and Marianne was taken to the Children's House in Moissac by the Jewish scouts, where she quickly became a troop leader. Soon after the Zone libre (the Free Zone) was invaded by the German army on November 11, 1942, she joined a Zionist youth resistance movement, the MJS, where she worked as a courier and escorted refugee children out of France. She also operated as part of the Garel network operated by the OSE in coordination with the Jewish scouts and French resistance contacts. During the night of May 31, 1944, she was captured by the Gestapo while smuggling 28 Jewish children, most of them of German origin, over the Swiss border. Imprisoned in Annemasse with the children, she refused an attempt to help her to escape because she feared it would lead to reprisals against them. On July 7-8, Marianne and five other members of the French Resistance were taken in the middle of the chilly night into the woods of La Rape at Ville-la-Grand, a few miles from Annemasse, where they were beaten to death with batons, rifle butts, and shovels. The mass grave was discovered at the end of August. Marianne had most probably been raped before she was killed.The children were freed on July 7, 1944. For once, the Swiss authorities raised the barrier between the two countries, and the children were allowed freely into Switzerland.

=== Children of the Wagner-Bürckel Deportation Campaign ===
On October 22 and 23, 1940, approximately 6,500 Jews, including 563 children, were deported from Baden and the Saarpfalz areas in Germany to the Gurs Internment Camp in the unoccupied so-called Free Zone of France. It became known as the Wagner-Bürckel Aktion, after the names of the two Nazi Gauleiters responsible for it. Of the children, 417 survived: 206 hidden with families, on farms, in monasteries, or as part of the Resistance in France; 96 were brought to safety in the U.S. or elsewhere overseas with the help of Quaker activists in France. 104 escaped to Switzerland. Nine survived extermination camps.” For some of these rescued children, Brigitte and Gerhard Brändle found evidence that Moissac played a role in their rescue. However, this was likely the case for more children than the Brändles could document. One example is Erich Gaber, mentioned below, for whom they could confirm rescue by the OSE but not his long-standing connection to the Children's Home in Moissac. The fact that in their book the Brändles often use the term "Nazi-Wehrmacht," when writing about actions against Jews, shows that they intentionally refused to linguistically separate the German army from the Nazi system whose war and occupation it served.

Name(s) & Year of Birth	Year of birth / Origin	Wartime Experience (after Gurs) & Rescue at Moissac	Post-War Career & Historical Legacy
Siegfried Adler	1928, (Mannheim)	Extracted from Gurs in February 1941 by American Quakers to Aspet orphanage; transferred to Moissac home post-Liberation.	Remained in France; buried in Mannheim.
Lucia / Lucie Alexander (alias Lucie d'Aubrinon) (born 1927)	1927, (Illingen, Saar)	Parents deported to Auschwitz. Rescued from Gurs August 11, 1942 by EIF volunteers; hidden in Brive; lived at Moissac home post-Liberation (photographed there 1944).	Completed hairdressing apprenticeship; survived in France.
Norbert Cahn & Walter Cahn	1930, 1933 (Karlsruhe)	Transferred from Gurs to Rivesaltes; parents murdered in Auschwitz. Rescued from Rivesaltes by OSE, taken to Moissac; issued false papers and hidden in Dieulefit after Nov 1942.	Liberated Aug 1944 by Canadian forces; both immigrated to live with relatives in the USA in 1947.
Heinz Coßmann	1926 (Heidelberg)	Rescued from Gurs and sheltered at Moissac home July 1942; fled independently to Switzerland Dec 1942 (EIF assisted).	Immigrated to Palestine 1945 with mother; died there in a car accident in 1946.
Trude Elkan	1923 (Speyer)	Extracted from Gurs February 1941 by Quakers to Aspet. Transferred to Moissac after Aug 26, 1942 raid.	Trained as student dressmaker at post-war Hôtel Moulin (Centre Artisanal). Immigrated to Chicago, USA, in Jan 1947 via London.
Ferdinand Heinz Falkenberg	1927 (Karlsruhe)	Rescued by OSE staff from Gurs, brought to Moissac; sheltered there while parents obtained US visas in Marseille.	Sailed to New York Dec 1941; settled in San Francisco.
Erika Fleischhacker (married name Erika Gold) (b. 1928)	1928 (Merchingen / Mannheim)	Transferred from Gurs to Rivesaltes; parents murdered in Auschwitz. Saved with false papers; hidden in Bordeaux, Montauban, and Toulouse.	Stayed on in Moissac after the Liberation. Immigrated to New York Dec 1947; married Samuel Gold in 1949.
Erich Gaber (alias Etienne Gerbier)	1932 (Karlsruhe / Heidelberg)	Deported to Gurs in Oct 1940. Arrived at Moissac home May 8, 1941; hidden on rural farm as Etienne Gerbier (Nov 1942–Nov 1943).	Returned to Moissac until 1949/50. Settled in France (Saint-Brieuc).
Leo Goldlust & Paula Goldlust	1924, 1928 (Konstanz)	Transferred from Gurs to Rivesaltes; mother murdered in Auschwitz; father died in London. Leo was freed from Rivesaltes summer 1942, EIF false papers, Vichy youth camp, sheltered at Moissac, joined Maquis & French Army. Paula: OSE rescued to Masgelier/Chambéry/Annecy, escaped to Switzerland May 1943.	As a French soldier, Leo helped to liberate Konstanz in 1945. Both immigrated to the USA (Paula in 1947, Leo in 1954).
Fred / Zvi Freddy Groß (1930–1948)	1930 (Mannheim)	Deported to Gurs and Rivesaltes; parents deported to Auschwitz. Rescued from Rivesaltes May 15, 1942 by EIF to Moissac; later to Toulouse.	Sailed on a Youth Aliyah ship to Palestine via Cyprus in 1947. Joined Irgun/Etzel in Jerusalem; fell in battle May 16, 1948 during Israeli War of Independence; reburied on Mount Herzl.
Margot Günther (alias Marguerite Guery; married name Margot Jeremias)	1926 (Heidelberg)	Deported to Gurs and Rivesaltes; parents deported to Auschwitz. Rescued April 1942; hidden as nanny (Marguerite Guery) in Brive and Ussel.	Went to Moissac after the Liberation for pediatric nurse training. Married Martin Jeremias; settled in USA.
Ruth Haas	1924 (Rülzheim)	Deported to Gurs with family. At Moissac home July 1942; hidden in Carcassonne; escaped across Swiss border Dec 24, 1942 with cousin Thea Kahn.	Immigrated to the USA after the war.
Ruth Hamburger	1930, (Malsch, Heidelberg)	Deported to Gurs; rescued Feb 1941 by Quakers to Aspet.	Immigrated to Boston, USA, in Jan 1947.
Alfred Joseph & Marianne "Marion" Joseph	1925, 1929, (Mannheim)	Transferred from Gurs to Rivesaltes. Brought to Moissac, false identity; hidden on two rural farms until Liberation. Rescued from Rivesaltes; sheltered at Moissac children's home (photographed 1944).	After the Liberation, stayed at the lived at Moissac Centre Artisanal (Vocational training centre). Both siblings immigrated together to the USA in Dec 1946.
Hans Kahn (alias René Albert Philibert) (b. 1927)	1927 (Mannheim)	Interned at Rivesaltes camp. Rescued autumn 1941 to Moissac; false papers (René Albert Philibert), hidden near Agen Aug 1942.	Returned to Moissac post-war. Immigrated to Palestine in 1947.
Irene Kahn	1924 (Walldürn)	It is not known how she survived in France after the Gurs internment.	She is pictured in a photograph taken in Moissac in 1944, and the Brändles said she was still living in Moissac in 1946.No other information has been found.
Thea Kahn (married name Thea Theresa Zwern)	1922 (Mannheim)	Transferred from Gurs to Rivesaltes; at Moissac July 1942; was hidden with a family in Carcassonne; escaped to Switzerland Dec 24, 1942 with cousin Ruth Haas.	Immigrated to USA June 1947; married Elias Zwern.
Helmut (Isaac) Krämer ("Zébu")	1925 ( Bonn / Reil)	Transferred from Gurs to Rivesaltes with parents. Brought to Moissac June 1942 by Pastor André Dumas, joined Resistance (nom de guerre Zébu), escaped to Spain 1944.	Immigrated to Palestine 1944 (Kefar-Ata).
Irene Krämer (born 1921)	1921 (Bonn)	Rescued from Rivesaltes by OSE workers. Hidden in Vabre with false Protestant scout papers provided by Pastor Robert Cook and the Rulland sisters. Reunited with her brother at the EIF Lautrec farm school.	Irene worked as a nursery school teacher in Dijon, France after the war.
Doris Landmann (Dorle) (1926–2008)	1926 (Mannheim)	Extracted from Gurs and hidden by OSE. Mother and brother died in Auschwitz.	Sheltered at Moissac after the Liberation. Immigrated to New York, USA, July 1947; dressmaker in Flushing.
Paul Levie, Hans Levie & Salo / Freddy Levie	1928, 1929, 1940 (Saarwellingen)	Transferred from Gurs to Rivesaltes; father murdered in Auschwitz. Salo rescued and taken July 1942 to Limoges Pouponnière (small children's home);	Hans & Paul lived at Moissac home immediately after the war. All three brothers immigrated with mother Anna to USA.
Gretel Levy	1926 (Breisach)	Transferred from Gurs to Rivesaltes (March 1941); mother died in camp. Extracted from Rivesaltes by EIF volunteers; sheltered at Moissac home.	Survived war; father and brother Bruno fought in the French Resistance.
Erich Mann	1923 (Kaiserslautern)	Transferred to Rivesaltes; parents and brother killed in Auschwitz. Rescued from Rivesaltes; sheltered at Moissac home; joined the French Resistance.	Immigrated to USA July 1948; tailor in Los Angeles.
Manfred Mayer (alias Marcel Mantes) and Heinz Mayer	1929, 1932 (Hoffenheim)	Rescued from Gurs February 1941 by Quakers to Aspet, then Catholic orphanage in Toulouse. Manfred brought to Moissac 1942, hidden on farm as Marcel Mantes, also at Beaumont-de-Lomagne boarding school, joined Jewish Resistance; Heinz escaped to Switzerland May 1944.	Manfred returned to Moissac (1944–1946), immigrated to Brooklyn, USA (Dec 1946); Heinz went to Israel (1948); brothers reunited in Israel in 1972.
Richard Plato	1925, (Mannheim)	Transferred from Gurs to Rivesaltes; parents murdered in Auschwitz. Rescued June 1942 from Rivesaltes; sheltered at Moissac home; escaped to Switzerland October 31, 1942 (OSE/EIF/Cimade/MJS).	Immigrated to Palestine in 1945.
Ludwig Schlorch (b. 1929)	1929 (Kuppenheim)	Rescued by OSE from Rivesaltes; hidden at Montintin; escaped French Militia (Milice) raid. Hidden at Beaulieu-sur-Dordogne.	Was at the Moissac home after the Liberation (photographed there in 1944). Immigrated to USA in 1946.
Renée Stein	1923 (Vienna)	Saved from Rivesaltes by the OSE. Brought to the Farm of Charry in June 1942, became a very good friend of Hannelore Trautmann.	In 1948, she married Gustav Karl, an Auschwitz survivor.
Hannelore Annette Trautmann (married name Haguenauer)	1923 (Karlsruhe)	Arrived at Moissac in July 1942 from Rivesaltes; later hidden in Cazaubon (Château Bégué) by Mayor Fernand Sentou, then joined the communist UJJF resistance in Lyon. Mother murdered in Auschwitz.	Survived and spent decades documenting resistance history, securing Yad Vashem Righteous honors for rescuers of herself and Renée Stein in Cazaubon and Lyon.
Oskar Max Trautmann	1926 (Karlsruhe)	Deported to Gurs and then Rivesaltes; mother murdered in Auschwitz; saved by OSE, sheltered at Moissac from Aug 26, 1942.	Immigrated to the USA in 1946.
Erna Ullmann (alias Erna Ulmer)	1928 (Pforzheim)	Interned at Rivesaltes. Rescued by OSE (Chabannes); hidden in Moissac & Beaumont-de-Lomagne under protection of teachers Jean-Marie & Jeanne Arquié; lived after the war at Hôtel Moulin.	Immigrated to USA in January 1947

== The Ten Righteous Among the Nations of Moissac ==
Yad Vashem officially recognised 10 citizens of Moissac as Righteous Among the Nations for their exceptional bravery in shielding and saving children of the Home. However, many other Righteous, who helped to save Moissac home children, but who did not themselves live in Moissac, such as Jeanne and Jean-Marie Arquié, who lived in Beaumont-de-Lomagne, about 24 miles away, are mentioned elsewhere in this article. The 10 people from the town of Moissac itself are:

Rescuer Name	Role / Occupation	Key Rescue & Resistance Contributions	Yad Vashem Recognition Date
Alida Bourel	Local Farmer	Partnered with her husband Pierre to care for and protect Bernard Simon and the Simon family in hiding.	April 1, 2014
Eli Henri Bourel	Farmer (Son of Pierre & Alida)	Worked alongside his parents to maintain security, the running of the farm, and daily care for the hidden Simon family members.	April 1, 2014
Pierre Bourel	Farmer	Provided safe shelter, food, and long-term concealment on his farm for members of the Simon family (including Bouli's nephew, Bernard Simon) from summer 1942 to December 1944.	April 1, 2014
Renée Bourel	Farmer (Daughter-in-law of Pierre & Alida)	Assisted the Bourel family network in sheltering and feeding the Simon family throughout the German occupation.	April 1, 2014
Manuel Darrac	Municipal Secretary (Town Clerk)	Supplied authentic municipal seals, blank identity cards, false residence permits, and food ration cards; alerted EIF leadership to coming round-ups and provided safe addresses.	June 24, 1990
Henriette Ducom	Municipal Employee	Secured forged identity documents and ration cards for children and scout leaders (including Elisabeth "Bugie" Hirsch); located physical safehouses in town and the surrounding countryside.	May 16, 1989
Jean Gainard	Coal Merchant	Supplied coal to heat the children's home; surrendered his entire set of personal identity documents (ID card, ration book, baptismal certificate, driver's license) to La Sixième leader Henri Wahl, allowing Wahl to travel safely across France.	May 1, 1989
Albini Jean Ginisty ("Jean")	Local Citizen & Resistance Member	Hid chemical forgery equipment and soft linoleum stamps for La Sixième; sheltered Shatta and Bouli Simon's eldest son, Jean-Claude, presenting him as an adopted son.	October 15, 2013
Ernestine Maria Ginisty	Local Citizen	Partnered with her husband Albini Jean in concealing the forgery workshop and raising Jean-Claude Simon under an assumed name with the silent complicity of local neighbours.	October 15, 2013
Alice Pelous	Deputy Municipal Secretary	Collaborated with Darrac in stamping false identity cards and issuing ration books; lent her own personal identity papers to Shatta Simon during the 1943 dispersal.	June 24, 1990

== 12 Other Righteous Among the Nations associated with Helping Children from the Moissac Home ==
Rescuer Name(s)	Location / Role	Key Rescue & Resistance Contribution	Children / Youth Protected
Jean-Marie Arquié & Jeanne Arquié	Schoolteachers in Beaumont-de-Lomagne (Tarn-et-Garonne)	Provided long-term safe shelter and false identities; courageously pulled a bluff on suspicious Vichy police during a school raid in 1943.	Erna Ullmann, Daniel Fajnzang, and Suzette Fajnzang.
Pastor Robert Cook	Protestant Pastor in Vabre (Tarn)	Helped shield refugee youngsters in the Tarn region, issuing false Protestant scout papers to protect them during round-ups.	Irene Krämer.
Sophie Coursange	Rescuer in Lyon (Rhône)	Provided safe lodging and assistance to older girls from Moissac who relocated to Lyon to join the communist-aligned resistance (Union de la Jeunesse Juive de France).	Renée Stein and Hannelore Trautmann (Haguenauer).
Pastor André Dumas	Cimade volunteer & Protestant Pastor	Extracted interned youth from the Rivesaltes camp and brought them to Moissac in June 1942; later secured release and false papers for youth after failed border crossings.	Isaac (Helmut) Krämer.
Édouard Lebreil & Alice Lebreil	Residents of Golfech / Lamagistère (Tarn-et-Garonne)	Provided rural safehouses; took in young Jean-Claude Simon (son of Shatta and Bouli) under the alias "Lepoux" during intense armed fighting in summer 1944.	Sarah Tieder-Kaminsky and Jean-Claude Simon.
Gilbert Lesage	Director of Social Services for Foreigners in Vichy (Quaker activist)	Used his high-ranking position within the Vichy administration to secretly tip off EIF leader Robert Gamzon on August 25, 1942, regarding upcoming mass round-ups, enabling emergency dispersals.	Children of the Moissac Home (Bourganeuf summer camp cohort).
Hélène Rulland & Simone Rulland	Rescuers in the Tarn department	Worked alongside local Protestant networks to shelter and care for refugee girls who were dispersed from Moissac or the EIF farm school at Lautrec.	Irene Krämer.
Fernand Sentou & Yvette Sentou	The Mayor (Gers) and his wife.	Provided safe accommodation, false identity documents, and official municipal protection to hidden youth.	Hannelore Trautmann and Renée Stein.

== Keeping the Memory Alive ==
Moissac, ville de justes oubliée (Moissac, the Forgotten Town of the Righteous) founded by Simone and Jean-Claude Simon, the son of Shatta and Bouli Simon, is an association dedicated to preserving the memory of the Children's Home and the protective climate and actions of the population of Moissac and surrounding farming families, individuals and institutions who saved Jewish children in the town. It provides a network and homecoming platform for the "children of Moissac" and their descendants, now scattered worldwide. At first, the association collected testimonies and worked alongside the French Committee for Yad Vashem to successfully petition for recognition of its local Righteous.

Since then, it has hosted historical colloquiums (notably in 2013 and 2016), and protected physical markers in the town of the people and places associated with the activities of the Home. In 2013, a promenade starting at the historic Moulin de Moissac, which housed the home for six years after the war, was officially renamed L'Esplanade des justes to honour the town's righteous. A part of the association's preservation work has been to develop immersive digital spaces, such as the online Virtual Visits of the Maison des Justes, which is devoted to the psychological states of children who survived the Nazi Occupation of France thanks to the Jewish Scout home at Moissac, only to find, upon returning to it after the war that they had no parents left. The film director, Nicolas Ribowsky, is the vice-president of the association.
