= Marine Hamelet =

French politician (born 1967)

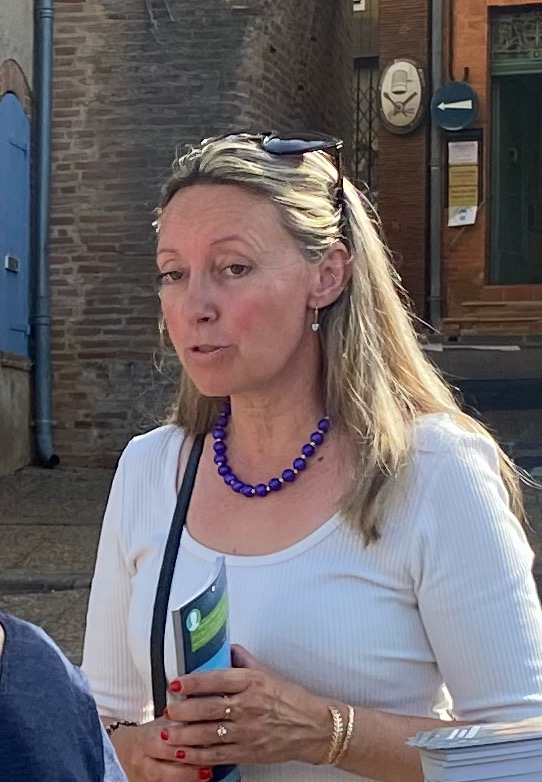

Member of the National Assembly for Tarn-et-Garonne's 2nd constituency
- Incumbent
- Assumed office 22 June 2022
- Preceded by: Sylvia Pinel

Personal details
- Born: 13 July 1967 (age 58) Savigny-sur-Orge, France
- Party: National Rally

Marine Hamelet (born 13 July 1967) is a French politician who has represented the 2nd constituency of the Tarn-et-Garonne department in the National Assembly since 2022. She is a member of the National Rally (RN).

== Career ==
A native of Savigny-sur-Orge south of Paris, Hamelet holds a degree in law and a master's degree in business studies. She worked as an executive for a sales company prior to her entering politics.

In the 2022 legislative election, she stood as the National Rally candidate in the 2nd constituency of Tarn-et-Garonne. Her campaign was notably supported by fellow National Rally politician Romain Lopez, who has served as Mayor of Moissac since 2020. She won the seat and succeeded Sylvia Pinel of the Radical Party of the Left, who failed to qualify for the second round. Hamelet hereby became the first member of the National Assembly elected in Tarn-et-Garonne for the National Rally in history.

In Parliament, she sits on the Committee on Foreign Affairs.

== Personal life ==
Hamelet resides in Saint-Orens-de-Gameville, Tarn-et-Garonne.
