= Participatory democracy in the European Union =

Overview article

Participatory democracy "is founded on the direct action of citizens who exercise some power and decide issues affecting their lives". Participatory democracy refers to mechanisms through which citizens are involved in public decision-making processes, not as an alternative to representative democracy but as a complement to it.

== History of participatory democracy in the European Union ==
In the past several years, the European Union (EU) has been going through a crisis that has been described as a "crisis of legitimacy" or as a " democratic deficit". To overcome this, the EU has put in place different strategies, one of them being that of participatory democracy. The EU has included the thematic of participation in its communication since the 2000s with the White Paper of the Prodi Commission which was published in July 2001.

The Lisbon Treaty, which came into force in 2009, marks another step forward in terms of citizen participation at the European level. Indeed, "in order to bring citizens closer to decision-making in Europe, the Treaty of Lisbon introduces, in an unprecedented way, elements that promote citizens' participation in the democratic life of the Union":

- The principle of participatory democracy is enshrined in Article 11 of the EU Treaty;
- The treaty creates a citizens' initiative right;
- The Treaty recognises the importance of dialogue between citizens, civil society associations and the institutions of the EU;
- The Council of Ministers sits in public when it deliberates and votes on European legislation.

Since a few years, a number of scholars, such as Sabine Saurugger, have notice an institutionalisation of a ‘participatory norm’ in the EU. This is reflected in the fact that nowadays it is difficult to create policies that have not been subject to some kind of participation by European citizens. This is reflected, for example, in the fact that the European Commission regularly seeks the opinion of citizens and stakeholders when developing policies or legislation.

As author Graham Smith highlights, it is important to know whether these democratic mechanisms really offer decision-making power for citizens. By emphasising this point, Smith refers to the incumbent democracy of author Ricardo Blaug, who argues that democracy is primarily motivated to preserve and improve existing institutions by maximising well-ordered participation, which means that today's democracy attempts to improve participation while maintaining control over it by institutionalising it. It is relevant to question the nature of the participatory mechanisms set up at European level and their degree of effectiveness. As Sherry Arnstein pointed out, "Participation without redistribution of power is empty and frustrating process for the powerless. It allows the powerholders to claim that all sides were considered, but makes it possible for only some of those sides to benefit, it maintains the status quo."

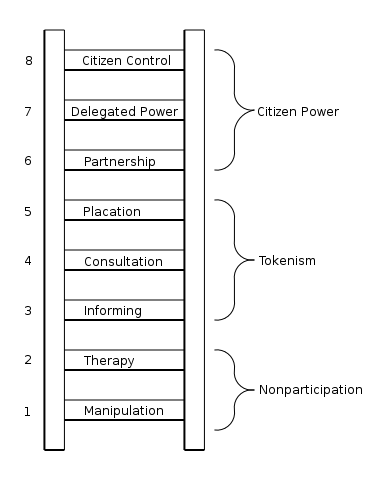
Ladder of participation - Sherry Arnstein

=== The ladder of participation of Arsntein ===
The ladder of participation, which was theorised by the author Sherry Arnstein in 1996, provides an indication of the level of participation of citizen participation mechanisms. As explained by the organisation Organizing Engagement: "the Ladder of Citizen Participation is one of the most widely referenced and influential models in the field of democratic public participation."

This is how this ladder of participation breaks down:

1. Manipulation:At this lowest level of the ladder, participation generally corresponds to a public relations tool put in place by political decision-makers.
2. Therapy: the elected representatives believe that citizens are not able to take actively part into the decision-making process and thus they "subject citizens to paternalistic education exercises, or clinical group therapy, as a form of enlightenment."
3. Informing: This level consists of informing citizens about their rights and responsibilities. At this level, information is one-way and goes from policy makers to citizens and there is no possibility for citizens to respond. " The most frequent tools used for such one-way communicationate are the news media, pamphlet, poster and responses to inquiries."
4. Consultation: At this level, citizens are invited to give their opinion. However, there is no guarantee that their opinions will be taken into consideration."The most frequent methods used for consulting people are attitude surveys, neighborhood meetings, and public hearings." As Arnstein says "what citizens achieve in all this activity is that they have "participated in participation‟ and what the powerholders achieve is the evidence that they have gone through the required motions of involving those people".
5. Placation: The distinction between the rung of consultation and placation is very subtle. In the rung of placation, a certain margin of influence is given to citizens who participate in the mechanisms "but their participation is largely or entirely tokenistic: citizens are merely involved only to demonstrate that they were involved."
6. Partnership: This implies that power is reallocated through bargaining between powerholders and citizens. Both sides "agree to share planning and decision·making responsibilities through such structures as joint policy boards, planning committees and mechanisms for resolving impasses. After the groundrules have been established through some form of give-and-take, they are not subject to unilateral change."
7. Delegated power: At this penultimate level, citizens have real power over a particular programme/policy/project, to the point that they "hold the significant cards to assure accountability of the program to them."
8. Citizen control: It is the highest level of the ladder of participation. This form of participation is the most advanced and an ideal to be achieved. Citizen control implies that "participants or residents can govern a program or an institution, be in full charge of policy and manageria.l aspects, and be able to negot iate the conditions under which "outsiders" may change them."

The 8 levels of the ladder of participation are themselves organised into three distinct categories:

- Level 1 and 2 are part of the category "nonparticipation"

Situated at the lowest levels of the ladder of participation, these two rungs are not really intended to create citizen participation. These levels correspond to the willingness of those with political power to educate, or even cure, the citizens taking part in these mechanisms.

- Level 3, 4 and 5 are part of the category "Degrees of Tokenism"

Tokenism is "the practice of making only a perfunctory or symbolic effort to do a particular thing, especially by recruiting a small number of people from underrepresented groups in order to give the appearance of sexual or racial equality within a workforce". It is a symbolic use of measures and decisions. Tokenism is a higher level of participation where citizens can make their voices heard but have no guarantee that they will be taken into account because all power remains in the hands of the political decision-makers.

- Level 6, 7 and 8 are part of the category "Degrees of citizen power"

The last level of the ladder corresponds to the most advanced forms of citizen participation. At these levels, real power is given to citizens, enabling them to have a real impact in societal debates. The mechanisms corresponding to these rungs remain exceptional and not very widespread.

== Permanent tools/mechanisms of participatory mechanism at the EU level ==
=== European Citizens' Initiative ===
The European Citizens' Initiative (ECI) is the most recent European participatory tool and it is "the world’s first transnational citizens’ initiative mechanism". The ECI, as a bottom-up mechanisms, is intended to give to the European citizens the right to ask the European Commission to adopt legislation. It was introduced with the Lisbon Treaty in the Article 11 paragraph 4, and has been operational since the first of April 2012. Presented as a tool to improve direct democracy in the EU, "there is, however, no element of mandate, and thus the measure has been conceived as an agenda-setting device, rather than a direct democracy measure."

The European Citizen's Initiative in numbers
Status	Number
Registration requests	101
Initiatives registered	76
Successful Initiatives	6

It can be seen that the number of initiatives that are considered as successful is low. It is also important to know what is defined as a successful initiative. Today, an initiative is considered to be successful if it has managed to gather the minimum one million signatures required. However, there is no mention of the nature of the commission's response as a determinant of the success or failure of the initiative. Up until now, the commission has formally responded to these successful initiatives by producing a Communication. However,"no initiative has so far resulted in a legislative action".

==== The European Citizens' Initiative on the Arnstein participatory ladder ====
According to Arnstein's ladder of participation, the European Citizens' Initiative is approximately on the 5th rung of the ladder (placation). Indeed, through this mechanism, European citizens are invited to make their voice heard on a particular issue of their choice. The difference with the consultation level is that citizens are free to decide on the subject of their initiative, as well as how they want to promote it in order to reach the required one million signatures. However, there is no room for negotiation between the citizen and the commission, as the commission has full control over the European Citizens' Initiative procedure, which is the reason why this mechanism cannot be ranked higher.

=== Right to petition ===
The right of petition, created with the entry into force of the Maastricht Treaty, is the oldest bottum-up mechanism available at the European level. It allows European citizens to submit a petition to the European Parliament. This mechanism can be considered as an agenda-setting tool as it allows European citizens to address the European institutions with a specific complaint or request for action. The ability to use a petition is subject to various conditions. For example, the petition must concern one of the EU's policy areas and the person submitting the petition must be an EU citizen/resident of an EU member state or a company/organisation with its registered office in the EU. The Petitions Committee is the key player in the right of petition since it is responsible for determining whether a petition is admissible or not and for organising the follow-up of the petition if it is considered receivable. In general, about 2/3 of the petitions received are considered valid.

==== The right to petition on the Arnstein participatory ladder ====
According to Arnstein's ladder of participation, the right to petition is located at the row number 3 (information). Indeed, if we refer to the definition of the level 3, Arnstein speaks of one-way communication from policy-makers to citizens. As the author Sophia Russack points out: "At the EU level, petitions do not usually result in legislative action but serve more as an information tool that operates in two directions. They convey information from citizens to the institutions with regards to implementation problems on the ground and shortcomings of individual cases." She also explains that petition "hardly trigger any other political attention or action such as plenary discussion or resolution adoption by the EP, or the launch of infringement procedures by the Commission. Very few petitions are transferred to the political level and rarely do they gain media attention"

=== Public consultations ===
Public consultations allow European citizens to give their opinion on a draft initiative of the European Commission or on "evaluations of the performance of existing EU actions". This right of consultation is enshrined in the Treaty on European Union in Article 11 paragraph: "The European Commission shall carry out broad consultations with parties concerned in order to ensure that the Union's actions are coherent and transparent." This top-down mechanism can be considered and an input mechanisms in policy formation. The European Commission has carried out 454 public consultations between 2015 and 2018. The average number of contributions has been growing, from an average of 461 contributions in 2015, to an average of 2,091 contributions in 2018.

==== Public consultations on the Arnstein participatory ladder ====
According to Arnstein's ladder of participation, public consultations by the European Commission are approximately on the 4th rung of the ladder (Consultation). Indeed, we can indeed speak here of consultation as mentioned by Arnstein: citizens are invited to give their opinion but there is no guarantee that their opinions will be taken into consideration. "Consultations fall under the category of ‘information provision’ in which groups “are invited to present evidence that may include facts, views, values and preferences" and as explained by Sophia Russack "these consultations do not serve to give citizens any direct control over or involvement in policymaking, rather it is experts that provide knowledge and feedback."

=== Freedom of information ===
Freedom of information is another participatory tool that can be included in the "administrative actions" category. Reflected in Article 15 of the Treaty on the Functioning of the EU, freedom of information allows European citizens and residents of EU member states to have access to documents of the European institutions. Freedom of information can be seen as both a top-down and a bottum-up mechanism: many documents are available online, but it is also possible to request access to documents that are not published. However, the European Commission has the right to refuse to publish or forward specific documents if they are included in the exceptions to public access defined in the regulation 1049/2001.

==== Freedom of information on the Arnstein participatory ladder ====
According to Arnstein's ladder of participation, freedom of information can be situated on the 3rd rung of the ladder (information). Again, this mechanism functions as a one-way communication mode where the EU provides, either from its own initiative or upon request, documents from the EU institutions. Freedom of information is a mechanism for guaranteeing the transparency of the European institutions. However, "transparency does not equal participation: it underpins democratic governance as it facilitates the accountability of policymakers, but it does not in itself guarantee increased democratic legitimacy".

== Occasional event / experiment of participatory democracy ==
=== Tomorrow’s Europe (2007) ===
The tomorrow's Europe event is considered to be the first deliberative polling organised at European level and bringing together citizens from different member states. The aim of this event was to stimulate democratic debate at European level and to address various social and economic issues affecting the EU. As part of the Plan D for Democracy of the European Commission, Tomorrow's Europe was organised by Notre Europe with the support of several other institutions (European Parliament, several think thanks,...). From the 12 to the 14 October 2007, the event brought together 362 citizens selected at random from the 27 EU Member States in the European Parliament in Brussels. The participants " were asked to respond to a series of questions, before and after discussions" with the aim of subsequently studying whether this deliberative process had led to a change of opinion on these issues.

==== Tomorrow's Europe on the Arnstein participatory ladder ====
The Tomorrow's Europe event can be situated at the 4th rung of the ladder (consultation). Indeed, what stands out most when considering the results of this event is the educational and informative aspect:"as a result of deliberating, the participants became dramatically more informed and changed their views about a number of important issues." In addition to this, one of Fishkin's (the creator of the deliberative polls) objectives was " to explore the effects deliberation and enhanced knowledge had on the attitudes and opinions of the public." It can be seen here that the event was more about involving citizens, educating them and studying the effects and results of the mechanism than about involving them in the European decision-making process.

=== Conference on the future of Europe (2021) ===
"The Conference on the Future of Europe is a citizen-led series of debates and discussions that will enable people from across Europe to share their ideas and help shape our common future." As part of Ursula Von Der Leyen's political strategy, this conference aims to give European citizens an "active role in shaping the future of the EU and its policies." As the event is still in the development stage, it is not possible at this point to define its accurate position on the Arnstein participation ladder. However, it is important to underline that the final declaration adopted by the institutions in charge (European Parliament, Council of the EU and European Commission) no longer mentions the possibility of treaty changes, as initially proposed by the European Parliament. This already reduces the possible impact of European citizens on the EU decision-making process and thus already potentially brings this event lower on the participation ladder.

== Overview of participatory tools and events at European level classified according to Arnstein's ladder of participation ==
Participatory mechanisms at the EU level
Participatory tools and events	Level on Arnstein's ladder of participation
European Citizen's initiative	5 - Placation
Public consultation	4 - Consultation
Tomorrow's Europe	4 - Consultation
Freedom of information	3 - Information
Right to Petition	3 - Information
Conference on the future of Europe	/

=== Limits of the ladder of participation ===
Arnstein's ladder of participation does not take into account some central elements of participatory democracy. The Arnstein ladder does not take into account the accessibility of the mechanisms it offers to citizens. This is because some of the mechanisms are complex and require a certain amount of expertise in order to be used effectively (e.g. the European Citizens' Initiative or the consultations organised by the European Commission) that some mechanisms may not be considered accessible to the general public.

In addition to technical complexity, many authors have observed that these mechanisms tend to be instrumentalised by organised civil society actors, by lobbies instead of the average European citizen, and therefore do not represent the views of the ordinary European. The ladder also does not take into account the degree of inclusion/ the inclusive nature of the mechanism it offers to citizens. The inclusive aspect refers, for example, to the way in which citizens are selected to participate in citizen consultations.

== See also ==
- Participatory democracy
- European Union
- European Commission
- European Parliament
- European Citizen's Initiative
- Right to petition
- Conference on the future of Europe
