= Sylvia Pinel =

French politician

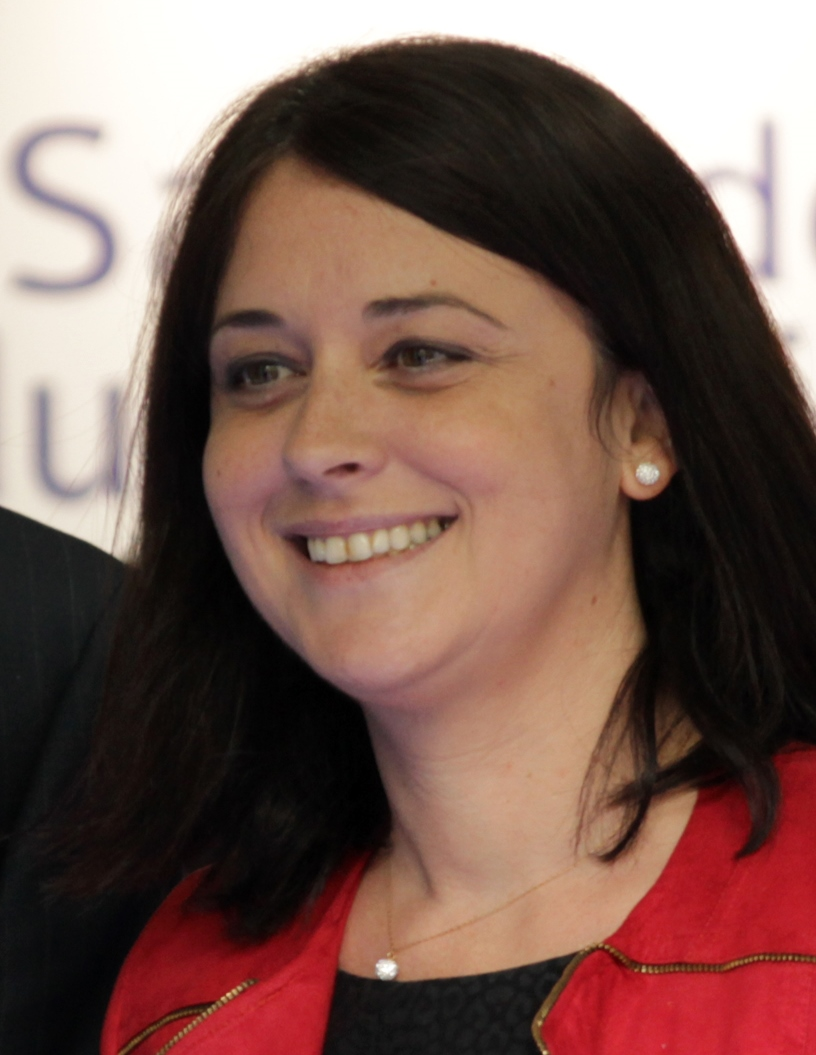
- Sylvia Pinel in 2013

Member of the National Assembly for Tarn-et-Garonne's 2nd constituency
- In office 12 March 2016 – 21 June 2022
- Parliament: 14th and 15th (Fifth Republic)
- Preceded by: Jacques Moignard
- Succeeded by: Marine Hamelet
- Parliamentary group: RRDP (2016-2017); NI (2017-2018); LIOT (2018-2021); App. LIOT (2021-2022)
- Constituency: Tarn-et-Garonne's 2nd
- In office 20 June 2007 – 21 July 2012
- Parliament: 13th and 14th (Fifth Republic)
- Preceded by: Jacques Briat
- Succeeded by: Jacques Moignard
- Parliamentary group: SRC (2007-2012); RRDP (2012)
- Constituency: Tarn-et-Garonne's 2nd

Co-president of the Radical Movement
- In office 9 December 2017 – 8 February 2019 Serving with Laurent Hénart
- Preceded by: Party created
- Succeeded by: Laurent Hénart (alone)

Member of the Regional council of Occitanie
- In office 4 January 2016 – 1 July 2021
- President: Carole Delga
- Constituency: Tarn-et-Garonne

Minister of Housing, Territorial Equality, and Rurality
- In office 2 April 2014 – 11 February 2016
- President: François Hollande
- Prime Minister: Manuel Valls
- Government: Valls I and II
- Preceded by: Cécile Duflot
- Succeeded by: Emmanuelle Cosse (Housing); Jean-Michel Baylet (Territorial planning and Rurality)

Minister of Arts and Crafts, Trade and Tourism
- In office 16 May 2012 – 31 March 2014
- President: François Hollande
- Prime Minister: Jean-Marc Ayrault
- Government: Ayrault
- Preceded by: Frédéric Lefebvre
- Succeeded by: Valérie Fourneyron (Trade and Arts and Crafts); Fleur Pellerin (Tourism)

Personal details
- Born: 28 September 1977 (age 49) L'Union, Haute-Garonne, France
- Party: PRG
- Education: Toulouse 1 University Capitole

Sylvia Pinel (French: [silvja pinɛl]; born 28 September 1977) is a French politician who served as a member of the National Assembly of France from 2016 to 2022, representing the 2nd constituency in the Tarn-et-Garonne department. Since 3 September 2016, she has been the leader of the moderate and social-liberal centre-left Radical Party of the Left.

== Early life and education ==
Pinel attended Lycée Michelet in Montauban, and received a DESS focusing on litigation and arbitration and a DEA in European law at Toulouse at the Toulouse 1 University Capitole, she studied her first year of law school at the university center of Montauban.

Pinel's mother was Deputy Mayor of Fabas, worked with Senator-Mayor radical Pierre Tajan. Her father, Michel Pinel, who died in 2011, was an alderman in Gargas.

== Political career ==
=== Member of the National Assembly, 2007–2012 ===
In the second round (run-off) election to the National Assembly in 2007, Pinel was elected in the 2nd constituency of Tarn-et-Garonne (Castelsarrasin). In the second round (run-off) election to the National Assembly in 2012, she was re-elected in the same constituency by 30,445 votes (54.31%) to 20,417 (40.14%) for her opponent, Dulac; there were 50,862 valid votes cast out of 89,289 electors.

In parliament, Pinel served on the Committee on Legal Affairs (2007-2012) and the Defence Committee (2016-2017).

=== Career in government ===
On 16 May 2012, Pinel was appointed Junior Minister for Crafts, Trade, and Tourism at the French Ministry of Productive Recovery by President François Hollande; shortly after, on 18 June 2012, she became Minister for Crafts, Trade, and Tourism at the French Ministry of Productive Recovery.

On 2 April 2014, Pinel was appointed Minister of Territorial Equality and Housing in the government of Prime Minister Manuel Valls. During her time in office, France announced measures in 2015 to boost its housing market, providing €2 billion ($2.15 billion) in tax relief to banks offering new zero-interest mortgages.

In the Socialist Party's primaries, Pinel ran to become the party's candidate in the 2017 French presidential election; she was the only female candidate. She eventually lost against Benoît Hamon.

=== Member of the National Assembly, 2017–2022 ===
In the second round (run-off) of the 2017 French legislative election, Pinel was re-elected in the same constituency by 21,398 votes (55.40%) to 17,230 (44.60%) for her National Front opponent, Romain Lopez; there were 38,628 valid votes cast out of 93,329 electors.

In parliament, Pinel served on the Commission on Economic Affairs from 2019 to 2022. She was also a member of the Finance Committee (2017-2020).

Following the formation of the Liberties and Territories (LT) parliamentary group in 2018, Pinel became its deputy chairwoman, under the leadership of co-chairs Bertrand Pancher and Philippe Vigier. When Vigier left the group in 2020, she succeeded him as co-chair.

Pinel lost her seat in the first round in the 2022 French legislative election. It was won by National Rally candidate Marine Hamelet in the second round.
