= Tarn-et-Garonne's 2nd constituency =

Constituency of the National Assembly of France

2nd constituency of Tarn-et-Garonne
- inline Constituency of the National Assembly of France

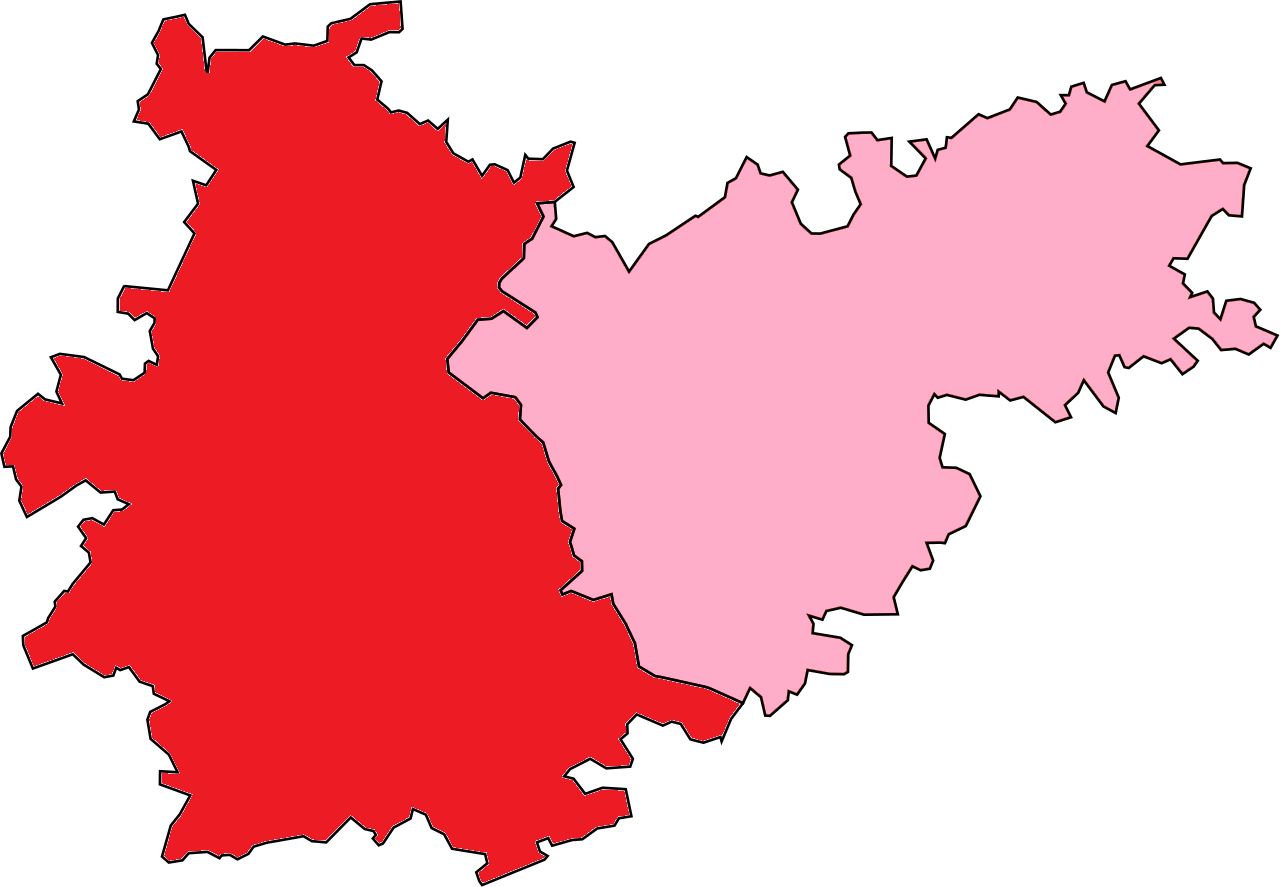
- Tarn-et-Garonne's 2nd Constituency shown within the Tarn-et-Garonne
- Deputy: Marine Hamelet; RN
- Department: Tarn-et-Garonne
- Cantons: Auvillar, Beaumont-de-Lomagne, Bourg-de-Visa, Castelsarrasin I, Castelsarrasin II, Grisolles, Lauzerte, Lavit, Moissac I, Moissac II, Montech, Montaigu-de-Quercy, Saint-Nicolas-de-la-Grave, Valence, Verdun-sur-Garonne
- Registered voters: 93,323

The 2nd constituency of the Tarn-et-Garonne (French: Deuxième circonscription de Tarn-et-Garonne) is a French legislative constituency in Tarn-et-Garonne département. Like the other 576 French constituencies, it elects one MP using the two-round system, with a run-off if no candidate receives over 50% of the vote in the first round.

== Description ==
The 2nd constituency of Tarn-et-Garonne is one of two in the department. This largely rural constituency covers its western half and includes the towns of Castelsarrasin and Moissac.

The seat has broadly followed national trends, however the small Radical Party of the Left has enjoyed a monopoly on the centre left candidature as part of an agreement with the much larger Socialist Party. At the 2017 election En Marche! failed to stand a candidate and the far right National Front secured a place in the final round at the expense of the mainstream conservative The Republicans who came third in the first round.

== Assembly Members ==
Election	Member	Party
1988	Jean-Michel Baylet	PRG
1993	Jacques Briat	UDF
1997	Jean-Paul Nunzi	PS
2002	Jacques Briat	UMP
2007	Jacques Briat	UMP
2012	Sylvia Pinel	PRG
2017	Sylvia Pinel	PRG
2022	Marine Hamelet	RN

== Election results ==
=== 2024 ===
Candidate	Party	Alliance	First round		Second round	
Candidate	Party	Alliance	Votes	%	Votes	%
Marine Hamelet	RN		32,578	49.17	37,015	61.51
Claudie Chrétien	LFi		12,286	18.54	23,166	38.49
Jules Duffaut	HOR	Ensemble	10,335	15.60		
Anne Ius	PRG	DVG	9,952	15.02		
Françoise Ratsimba	LO		791	1.19		
Claire Aymes	Ind		310	0.47		
Valid votes			66,252	96.57	60,181	88.37
Blank votes			1,545	2.25	5,655	8.30
Null votes			811	1.18	2,265	3.33
Turnout			68,608	70.59	68,101	70.06
Abstentions			28,586	29.41	29,098	29.94
Registered voters			97,194		97,199	
Result			RN HOLD			

=== 2022 ===
Legislative Election 2022: Tarn-et-Garonne's 2nd constituency
Party	Candidate	Votes	%	±%
RN	Marine Hamelet	15,187	31.00	+9.37
HOR (Ensemble)	Christian Astruc	10,083	20.58	N/A
PRG	Sylvia Pinel	9,892	20.19	−7.12
LFI (NUPÉS)	Nathalie Manchado	9,272	18.93	−0.65
REC	Frédéric Cases	2,463	5.03	N/A
Others	N/A	2,093	4.27	
Turnout		48,990	52.26	+3.43
2nd round result
RN	Marine Hamelet	23,678	54.99	+10.39
HOR (Ensemble)	Christian Astruc	19,384	45.01	N/A
Turnout		43,062	49.95	+8.56
RN gain from PRG				

=== 2017 ===
Legislative Election 2017: Tarn-et-Garonne's 2nd constituency
Party	Candidate	Votes	%	±%
PRG	Sylvia Pinel	12,450	27.31	
FN	Romain Lopez	9,857	21.63	
LR	Mathieu Albugues	8,579	18.82	
LFI	Ivan Jacquemard	6,282	13.78	
DVG	Thierry Hamelin	2,742	6.02	
EELV	Dominique Parcellier	1,661	3.64	
PCF	Françoise Tardin	986	2.16	
Others	N/A	3,024		
Turnout		45,581	48.83	
2nd round result
PRG	Sylvia Pinel	21,398	55.40	
FN	Romain Lopez	17,230	44.60	
Turnout		38,628	41.39	
PRG hold				

=== 2012 ===
Legislative Election 2012: Tarn-et-Garonne's 2nd constituency
Party	Candidate	Votes	%	±%
PRG	Sylvia Pinel	22,887	42.05	
FN	Marie-Claude Dulac	10,457	19.21	
UMP	Philippe De Vergnette	9,462	17.38	
DVD	Jacques Briat	4,560	8.38	
FG	Maximilien Reynes-Dupleix	2,978	5.47	
EELV	Joëlle Simonet	1,909	3.51	
Others	N/A	2,176		
Turnout		54,429	60.95	
2nd round result
PRG	Sylvia Pinel	30,445	59.86	
FN	Marie-Claude Dulac	20,417	40.14	
Turnout		50,862	56.96	
PRG hold				

=== 2007 ===
Legislative Election 2007: Tarn-et-Garonne's 2nd constituency
Party	Candidate	Votes	%	±%
UMP	Jacques Briat	19,874	37.51	
PRG	Sylvia Pinel	15,458	29.17	
MoDem	Valérie Rabassa	5,603	10.57	
FN	Pierre Verdier	2,751	5.19	
Far left	Laurence Carrara	1,834	3.46	
LV	Alain Jean	1,697	3.20	
CPNT	Jean-Yves Jouglar	1,695	3.20	
PCF	Françoise Durand	1,552	2.93	
Others	N/A	2,525		
Turnout		54,416	64.46	
2nd round result
PRG	Sylvia Pinel	26,811	50.71	
UMP	Jacques Briat	26,062	49.29	
Turnout		55,201	65.41	
PRG gain from UMP				

=== 2002 ===
Legislative Election 2002: Tarn-et-Garonne's 2nd constituency
Party	Candidate	Votes	%	±%
UMP	Jacques Briat	18,853	35.98	
PS	Jean-Paul Nunzi	14,866	28.37	
FN	Claude Michel	7,993	15.26	
CPNT	Chantal Delmas	2,334	4.45	
PCF	Hugues Bauchy	1,928	3.68	
LV	Genevieve Delfau	1,408	2.69	
LCR	Laurence Carrara	1,382	2.64	
Far right	Sandra Martinez	1,154	2.20	
Others	N/A	2,475		
Turnout		54,163	69.42	
2nd round result
UMP	Jacques Briat	26,537	54.22	
PS	Jean-Paul Nunzi	22,408	45.78	
Turnout		51,724	66.31	
UMP gain from PS				

=== 1997 ===
Legislative Election 1997: Tarn-et-Garonne's 2nd constituency
Party	Candidate	Votes	%	±%
PS	Jean-Paul Nunzi	13,391	26.14	
UDF	Jacques Briat	13,247	25.86	
FN	Claude Michel	7,585	14.81	
PCF	Michel Bertrand	4,786	9.34	
LV	Jean-Jacques Fraisse	2,034	3.97	
DVD	Roger Delfau	1,285	2.51	
MRC	Gérard Laveron	1,033	2.02	
Others	N/A	2,631		
Turnout		54,541	73.00	
2nd round result
PS	Jean-Paul Nunzi	27,437	51.63	
UDF	Jacques Briat	25,705	48.37	
Turnout		57,356	76.80	
PS gain from UDF				
