= European Initiative Prize =

Journalism prize in the European Union

The European Initiative Prize (French: Prix de l'Initiative Européenne) is a journalism prize, created in 2003 by the Maison de l’Europe de Paris and the European Press Club with the support of the European Parliament. The prize is awarded annually to media contributors who distinguished themselves with high quality work on European Union topics.

The award ceremony takes place every year in June at the Maison de l’Europe de Paris within the Hotel de Villiers, private mansion of the 19th century, property of the City of Paris and situated in the 17th district of Paris.

The ceremony is usually preceded by a debate on European topics. The jury – currently chaired by former MEP and Catherine Lalumière, President of the Maison de l’Europe de Paris – consists of French and European intellectuals. The Prize consists of a diploma of honour and of a piece of art, offered by the European Parliament. Usually, three "ex æquo" prizes are awarded annually.

== List of Laureates ==
=== 2019 Edition ===
- Alain Devalpo, association Globe Reporters
- Caroline Gillet, reporter of France Inter and France Culture for her French show « Foule Continentale »
- Jon Henley, correspondent for The Guardian

=== 2018 Edition ===
- Sylvain Kahn, professor and researcher at Sciences Po
- Marie-Christine Vallet, director of the European editorial at Radio France
- Voix d'Europe, blog created by two editors Virginie Cardoso and Chloé Lourenço
- The Vox Pop programme on Arte, represented by Marc Berdugo, producer of the show

=== 2017 Edition ===
- Olivier Breton, director of ParisBerlin
- Jacques Delors, former President of the European Commission
- Enrico Letta, former Secretary to the Council of Ministers of Italy and president of the Jacques Delors Institute

=== 2016 Edition ===
- Christophe Ayad, member of the Panama Papers project, journalist for the French newspaper Le Monde
- Franck Bourgeron, managing editor, La Revue Dessinée
- Daniel Cohn-Bendit for his journalistic work
- France Télévisions

=== 2015 Edition ===
- Cartooning for Peace
- Eurochannel
- Le Nouvel Observateur's Journées Europe

=== 2014 Edition ===
- Yves Bertoncini, Notre Europe –Jacques Delors Institute & Thierry Chopin, Robert Schuman Foundation (France) for their report: Des visages sur des clivages : les élections européennes de mai 2014
- Europavox
- Public Sénat

=== 2013 Edition ===
- Kattalin Landaburu, France 24
- Rudolf Chimelli, journaliste
- Euronews

=== 2012 Edition ===
- Nicolas Gros-Verheyde of Bruxelles2.eu
- Érik Izraelewicz, director of Le Monde
- Stefan de Vries, journalist

=== 2011 Edition ===
- Daniel Desesquelle presenting the Carrefour de l'Europe programme on 5 avril 2013 in Strasbourg.
- Alberto Toscano, journalist
- Pascal Verdeau, journalist, France 3

=== 2010 Edition ===
- Paul Germain, Le Bar de l’Europe TV5 Monde
- Stéphane Leneuf, Le Téléphone sonne – spécial Europe – France Inter
- Jean Quatremer, Libération newspaper

=== 2008 Edition ===
- Françoise Crouïgneau, chief international editor, Les Échos daily newspaper
- Philippe Dessaint for Kiosque on TV5 Monde
- Jean-Pierre Gouzy, former president of the European Journalist Association (AJE)

=== 2009 Edition ===
- Véronique Auger, rédactrice en chef de la rédaction Européenne de France 3
- Courrier International
- Quentin Dickinson, directeur chargé des Affaires européennes – Radio France

=== 2007 Edition ===
- Jérôme Clément, président d’Arte
- Daniel Vernet, directeur des Relations Internationales « Le Monde »
- Laurence Aubron pour « Eur@dionantes »

=== 2006 Edition ===
- Ferdinando Riccardi, Marina Gazzo, editors of l’Agence Europe
- Gérard Lignac, director general of Les Dernières Nouvelles d'Alsace
- Bernard Guetta, journalist and columnist at France Inter and L'Express

=== 2005 Edition ===
- Christine Ockrent for the programme France Europe Express on France 3
- François-Régis Hutin, Director -General, President of Ouest-France newspaper

=== 2004 Edition ===
- Cafebabel.com – online magazine
- France Culture's Cause Commune
- Anne-marie Autissier for her review, Culture Europe International
- La Croix newspaper
