= Juliette Pary =

Juliette Pary (August 6, 1903 – October 1, 1950) was a Jewish-French-Russian-born journalist, writer, translator and educator.

== Biography ==
Born Julia Gourfinkel in Odesa, she grew up in a Haskalah family which involved itself in Jewish life. She studied languages and literature. Following the Russian Revolution her family's financial situation deteriorated. Following the example of her sister, the writer Nina Gourfinkel, she moved to Paris, where she changed her surname to Pary, in homage to the city. She began working as a translator, and translated detective novels by Agatha Christie. From 1928 to 1930 she wrote in the nascent newspaper Embassies and Consulates (Ambassades et Consulats) about French diplomacy. She translated German novels by Stefan Zweig and Hermann Hesse.

In 1931 Pary married Isaac Pougatch, a Ukrainian refugee, who worked in an art gallery. Following the seizure of power by the Nazis in Germany, she and her husband helped German Jewish refugees, and worked with the Zionist youth organization Agriculture and Crafts (Agriculture et artisanat) and wrote in the weekly Jewish Journal (Journal Juif). Between 1933 and 1935 she published three novels.

In the 1930s Pary wrote for different magazines, among them Marianne and Regards, and was involved with the French Left Popular Front. In 1938 she was the Jewish delegate to the international women's conference on peace and democracy, and published articles about it. For three months she managed a Jewish children's summer camp. She depicted this period in her book My 126 children (Mes 126 gosses) which was adapted into a movie. Along with her husband she translated Anton Makarenko from Russian and Sholem Asch from Yiddish.

In 1940 Pary and her husband Isaac Pougatch escaped from the Germans to Moissac, where they managed an agricultural farm based on Zionist principals attached to the Jewish Children's Home in the town. In 1942 they escaped to Switzerland, and there she once again helped to save Jewish orphans. By 1944 she had returned to France and become a liaison officer for the Ministry of Prisoners, Deportees, and Refugees. In 1946 she published poems in German. In 1948 she published her experiences in the summer camps in the inter-war years in the book Law and freedom (Droit et liberté). In 1949 she got divorced.

After the founding of the Israeli State, Pary went to the Negev, and was the first European journalist to write about the Southern front in the 1948 Arab–Israeli War. Her impressions of it were published in the book Images from Young Israel (Images du jeune Israël)
