= Romain Lopez =

French politician and the mayor of Moissac

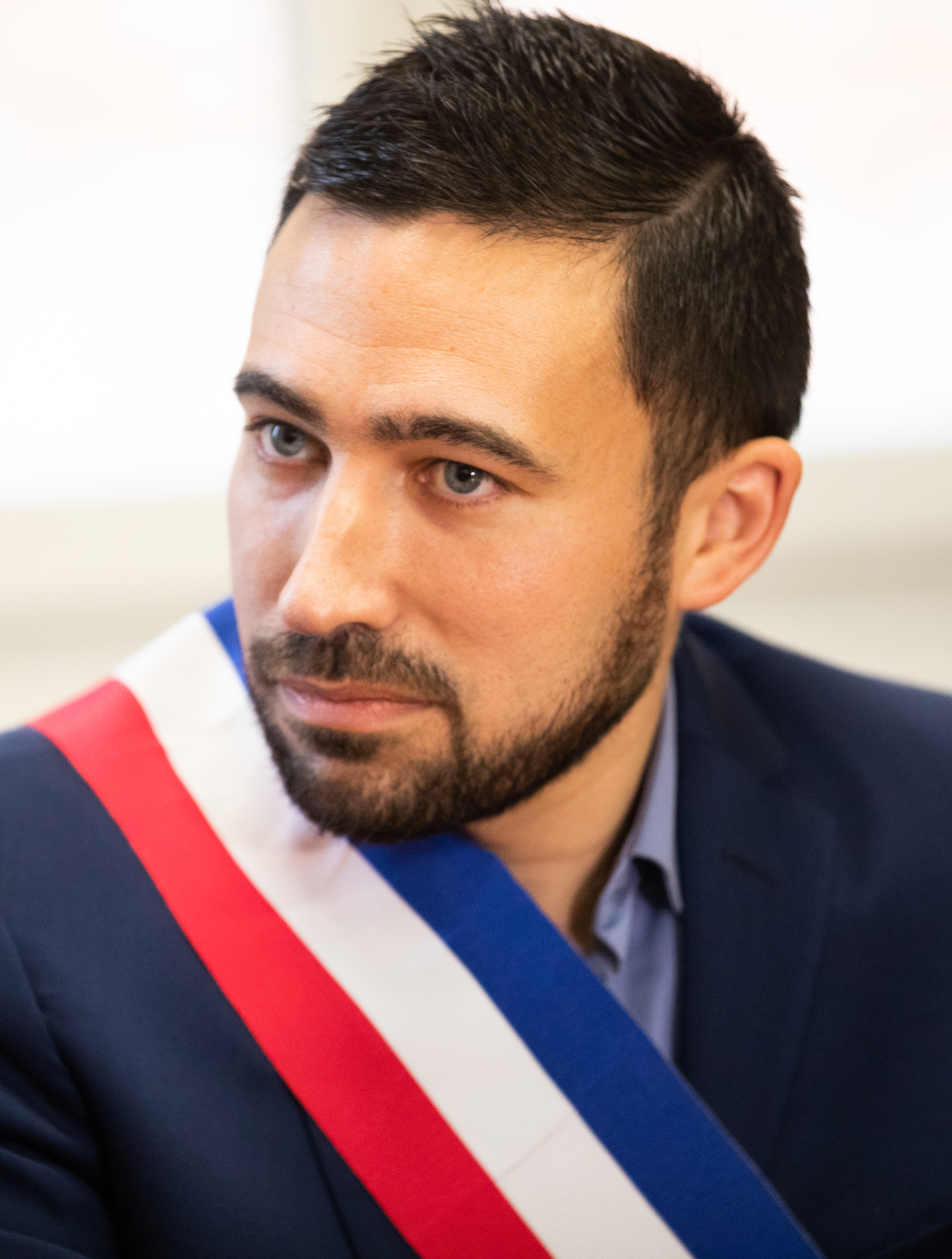
- Romain Lopez, mars 2022

Mayor of Moissac
- Incumbent
- Assumed office 4 July 2020
- Preceded by: Jean-Michel Henryot

Departmental councilor of Tarn-et-Garonne for Canton of Moissac
- Incumbent
- Assumed office 1 July 2021
- Preceded by: Jean-Michel Henryot

Personal details
- Born: 1989 (age 36–37) Moissac
- Party: FN/RN
- Occupation: Politician

Romain Lopez (born 1989) is a French politician and the mayor of Moissac.

== Biography ==
He was born in Moissac in 1989 and holds a master's degree in political science and another in history.

Romain Lopez joined the Front National (since 2018 National Rally) at the end of 2013. Running as the National Rally candidate, he was elected mayor of Moissac on 28 June 2020.
