= Alberto Toscano (journalist) =

Italian journalist

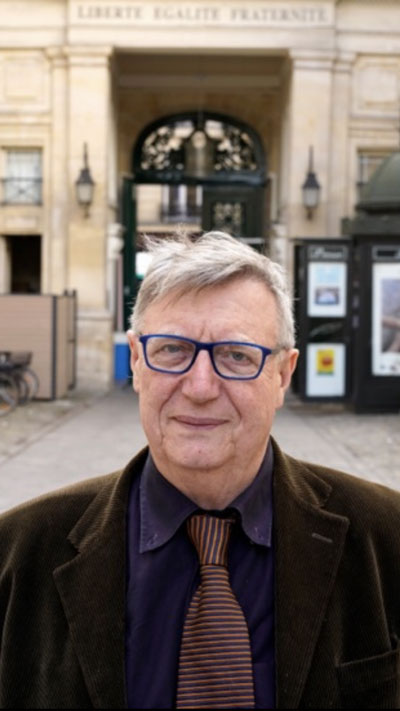

Alberto Toscano (born March 25, 1948) is an Italian journalist, writer and political scientist living in France since 1986 and working with several Italian and French media.

== Biography ==
Alberto Toscano was born in Novara, Piedmont, and graduated in political science from the Università Statale in Milan, Italy, in 1973 with a thesis on the war in Indochina. From 1974 to 1982, he worked as a researcher at the Istituto degli Studi di Politica Internazionale (ISPI) in Milan and served as the editor of the ISPI weekly review Relazioni Internazionali. In 1977 and 1978 he received journalism training from the CFJ journalism school in Paris, France. Appointed International Bureau chief of the Italian weekly Rinascita in 1982-1983, he was then editor and special correspondent of the daily newspaper L'Unità until 1986, when he became the Paris correspondent of the daily economic magazine ItaliaOggi.

He is the author of over 5000 articles on France, published by Italian newspapers of several political tendencies: ItaliaOggi, L'Indipendente, Il Giornale.

He works as a journalist and political commentator for several media outlets — in Italy with the press agency Agenzia Giornali Associati (AGI), the RAI public radio and the private television group Mediaset, and in France with Nouvel Observateur, RFI, France Culture, France Inter and TV5. It also collaborates with the daily La Croix and served as president of the Foreign Press Association in France in 1996-1997, and currently serves as the president of the European Press Club since 2000 and President of the cultural association Piero Piazzano di Novara since 2001. Finally, since 2008, he is a member of the Board of Directors of the French Section of the Union of Francophone Press (UPF).

He is visiting professor in Political Science at Sciences-Po in Bordeaux. He is a member of the Training and Research Unit of Italian Language and Literature at the Sorbonne University in Paris.

He was received into the French National Order of Merit.

== Bibliography ==
He is the author of several books published both in French and Italian:

- Terzo Mondo: dal neutralismo al non-allineamento, Moizzi editore, (collective work), Milano, 1976
- La Cina compie il miliardo, éditions Il Corriere del Ticino, Lugano, 1980.
- Indira Gandhi, éditions Marzorati, Milan, 1980
- L'India oggi, éditions Franco Angeli, Bologne, 1984 (collective work), Iglesias Award in 1985.
- La frontiera difficile. Relazioni Urss-Cina, (collective work), éditions Editori Riuniti, Rome, 1986.
- L'anti-américanisme en Italie, Cahiers d'Histoire sociale, Albin Michel, Paris, 2003 (collective work on European Anti-Americanism).
- L'Italie aujourd'hui, situation et perspectives après le séisme des années 1990, (collective work), L'Harmattan, Paris, 2004.
- France-Italie. Coups de tête, coups de cœur, Tallandier, Paris, 2006.
- Critique amoureuse des Français, Hachette, Paris 2009.
- Vive l'Italie. Quand les Français se passionnaient pour l'unité italienne, Armand Colin, Paris, 2010.
- Critica amorosa dei francesi, Interlinea Edizioni, Novara, 2011.
- Ces gaffeurs qui nous gouvernent, Fayard, 2011.
- Chapter « Italie » in Dictionnaire des Sexualités, Robert Laffont, Paris, 2014.
- Sacrés Italiens, Armand Colin, Paris, 2014.
- Benedetti Italiani!, Della Porta Editori, Pisa, 2014.
- I Giornali della Grande guerra – Les journaux de la Grande guerre; Istituto italiano di cultura – Mission du centenaire de la Première Guerre mondiale, Paris, 2014.
- Sihanouk e gli equilibri asiatici, Giuffré editore, Milano, 2014.
- Les Solidarités, sous la direction de Michel Wieviorka, Editions Sciences humaines, Parigi, 2017.
- Un vélo contre la barbarie nazie. L'incroyable destin du champion Gino Bartali, Armand Colin, Parigi, 2018.
- Che fine ha fatto il 68? (a cura di G. Cominelli) Guerini editore, Milano, 2018
