= Daniel Cohn-Bendit =

French-German politician (born 1945)

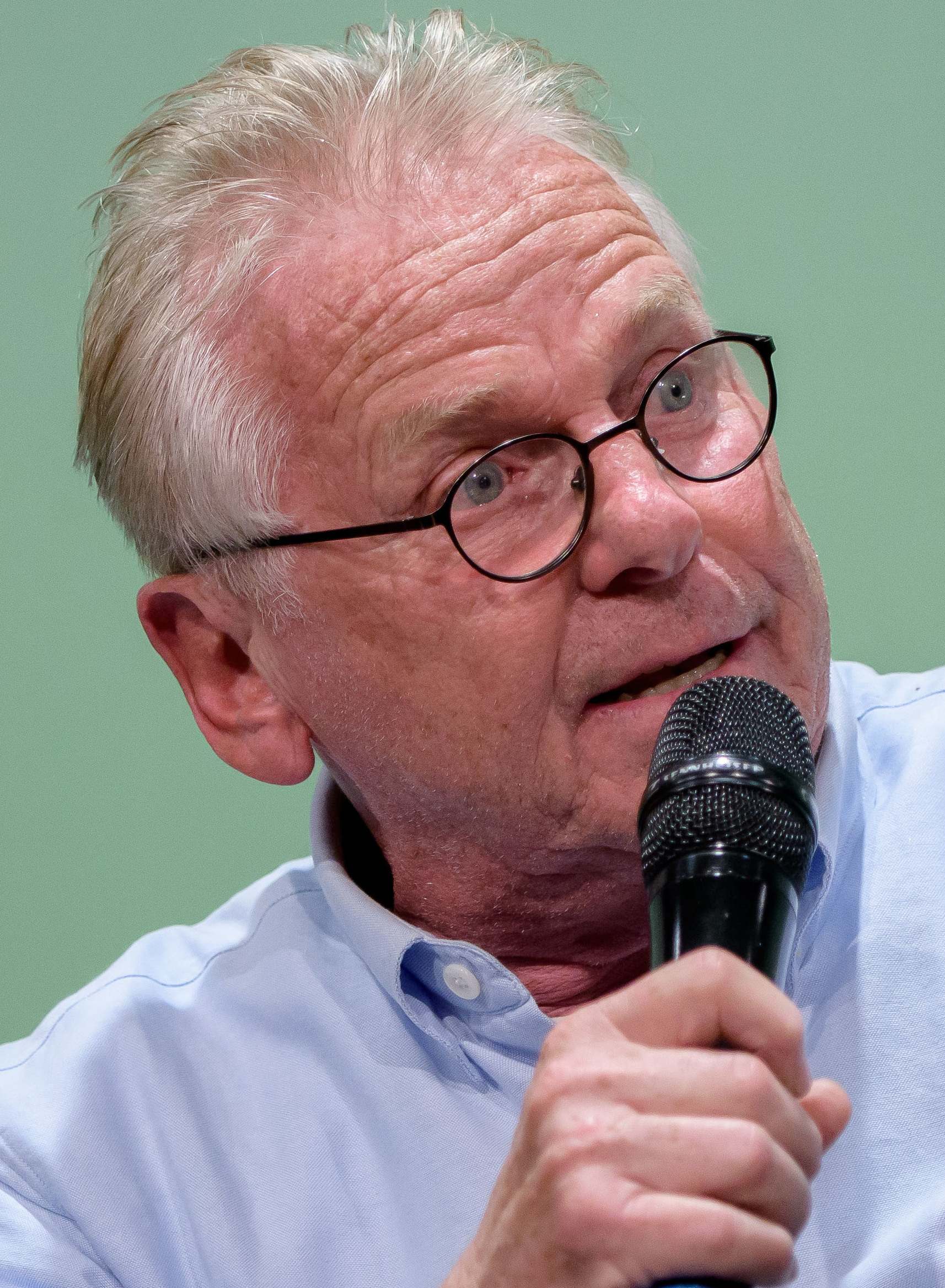
- Cohn-Bendit in 2018

Leader of Greens–European Free Alliance in the European Parliament
- In office 20 July 2004 – 1 July 2014 Serving with Rebecca Harms
- Preceded by: Paul Lannoye
- Succeeded by: Philippe Lamberts

Member of the European Parliament for Germany (France; 1999–2004; 2009–2014)
- In office 19 July 1994 – 1 July 2014
- Preceded by: multi-member district
- Succeeded by: multi-member district

Personal details
- Born: Daniel Marc Cohn-Bendit; 4 April 1945 (age 81) Montauban, Occitania, France
- Citizenship: Stateless (1945–1959); German (since 1959); French (since 2015)
- Party: Alliance 90/The Greens (1984–); Europe Écologie–The Greens (2010–2012)
- Other political affiliations: Les Verts (1984–2010)
- Relations: Gabriel Cohn-Bendit (brother)
- Children: 1
- Education: Paris-Sud University (no degree); University of Paris X: Nanterre (no degree)
- Website: Official website

Daniel Marc Cohn-Bendit (French: [danjɛl maʁk kɔ̃n bɛ̃ndi]; German: [ˈdaːni̯eːl maʁk koːn ˈbɛndɪt, -ni̯ɛl]; born 4 April 1945) is a French-German politician. Born stateless to a German-Polish Ashkenazi Jewish family, Daniel Cohn-Bendit obtained German citizenship in 1959 and French citizenship in 2015.

Cohn-Bendit was a student leader during the unrest of May 1968 in France and was also known during that time as Dany le Rouge (French for "Danny the Red", because of both his politics and the colour of his hair). He was co-president of the group European Greens–European Free Alliance in the European Parliament. He co-chairs the Spinelli Group, a European Parliament inter-group aiming at relaunching the federalist project in Europe. He was a recipient of the European Parliament's European Initiative Prize in 2016.

Cohn-Bendit's 1970s writings on sexuality between adults and children later proved controversial in 2001 and 2013. The same can be said of his statements to Radio Télévision Suisse (RTS) that same year, and his statements on the French TV show Apostrophes in 1982.

== Early life ==
Daniel Cohn-Bendit was born in Montauban, France on 4 April 1945, shortly after the Allied liberation of southern France.

His parents were German Jews who fled Nazi Germany in 1933. His father, Erich Cohn-Bendit, was a Berlin-based lawyer, self-proclaimed atheist and committed Trotskyist who had worked as a defense attorney for the Rote Hilfe and represented Hans Litten. His mother, Herta Cohn-Bendit (née David; 1908–1963), was born in Poznań and also worked as a lawyer. Several of their relatives who remained in Berlin were deported to Riga in 1942/43, where they either perished or were murdered.

In Paris, his parents became part of a circle of Jewish intellectuals that included Walter Benjamin, Heinrich Blücher, and philosopher Hannah Arendt, whose works would later strongly influence Daniel. After Erich was interned twice in 1939/1940, the family, including Daniel's older brother Gabriel Cohn-Bendit (born 1936), moved to Montauban, near Toulouse.

Following the war, they relocated to Paris and then to Cailly-sur-Eure in Normandy, where his parents ran a Jewish children's home. In 1949, the family returned to Paris when Herta took over the economic management of the Jewish École Maïmonide. His parents initially planned to emigrate to the United States and therefore did not apply for French citizenship for Daniel.

In 1952, Erich established a law practice in Frankfurt, while Herta and Daniel remained in Paris. Although his father applied for French citizenship for Daniel in 1958, the application remained incomplete due to missing documentation, leaving him stateless for several years. That same year, Daniel and his mother also moved to Frankfurt. The move was particularly difficult for the 13-year-old Daniel, who later recalled, "I cried every night... Even when one defends immigration, you have to know that it's horrible to be forced to leave. It chokes you."

In 1968, he was one of the vocal figures at the Congress of Carrara, one of the major anarchist congresses of the 20th century - his positions failed to gather broad support and he was broadly put in minority.

In Germany, he attended the progressive Odenwaldschule in Ober-Hambach near Heppenheim, Hesse.

== Selected works ==
He is the co-author, with his brother Gabriel Cohn-Bendit, of Obsolete Communism: The Left-Wing Alternative (Linksradikalismus: Gewaltkur gegen die Alterskrankheit des Kommunismus, 1968). This book combines an account of the events of May 1968 with a critique of Stalinism, the French Communist Party and the trade union establishment. The authors acknowledged their intellectual debt to the libertarian socialist group Socialisme ou Barbarie, especially Cornelius Castoriadis ("Pierre Chaulieu") and Claude Lefort.

== Allegations of sex with minors ==
In 2001, it was revealed that Cohn-Bendit had authored a 1976 article in the cultural-political magazine das da, in which he graphically described engaging in sexual activities with children under his care at a Frankfurt kindergarten. In 2013, a recording was discovered wherein Cohn-Bendit described an "incredibly erotic game" with a minor. With regard to the das da article, Cohn-Bendit claimed the described activities were not based on true events and were an "obnoxious provocation".

Swiss Radio Television (RTS) has undermined Cohn-Bendit's defense by citing him in their 2015 show C'était mieux avant (It Was Better Before). The remarks made by Daniel Cohn-Bendit in the 1975 show Destins are described as more than ambiguous: "Example, Daniel Cohn-Bendit... in the TSR program Destins in 1975, he made more than ambiguous statements about his relationships with children: "By having experiences with kids, playing with them, having emotional and even sexual relationships, sexual in the emotional sense, caresses, etc., I learned a lot about myself"."

== In popular culture ==
A modified photo of Cohn-Bendit confronting a police officer in May 1968 was used as cover art for the British punk-rock band Crisis for their 1997 compilation album We Are All Jews and Germans.

== Bibliography ==
- Daniel Cohn-Bendit and Gabriel Cohn-Bendit, Obsolete Communism: The Left-Wing Alternative, London: Andre Deutch, 1968 – translation of Le Gauchisme, remède à la maladie sénile du communisme (1968).
- Daniel Cohn-Bendit and Cornelius Castoriadis, De l'écologie à l'autonomie, Le Seuil, 1981.

== See also ==
- Federal Europe
- Pro-Europeanism
- Europe Ecology – The Greens
