= Gabriel Cohn-Bendit =

French activist and academic (1936–2021)

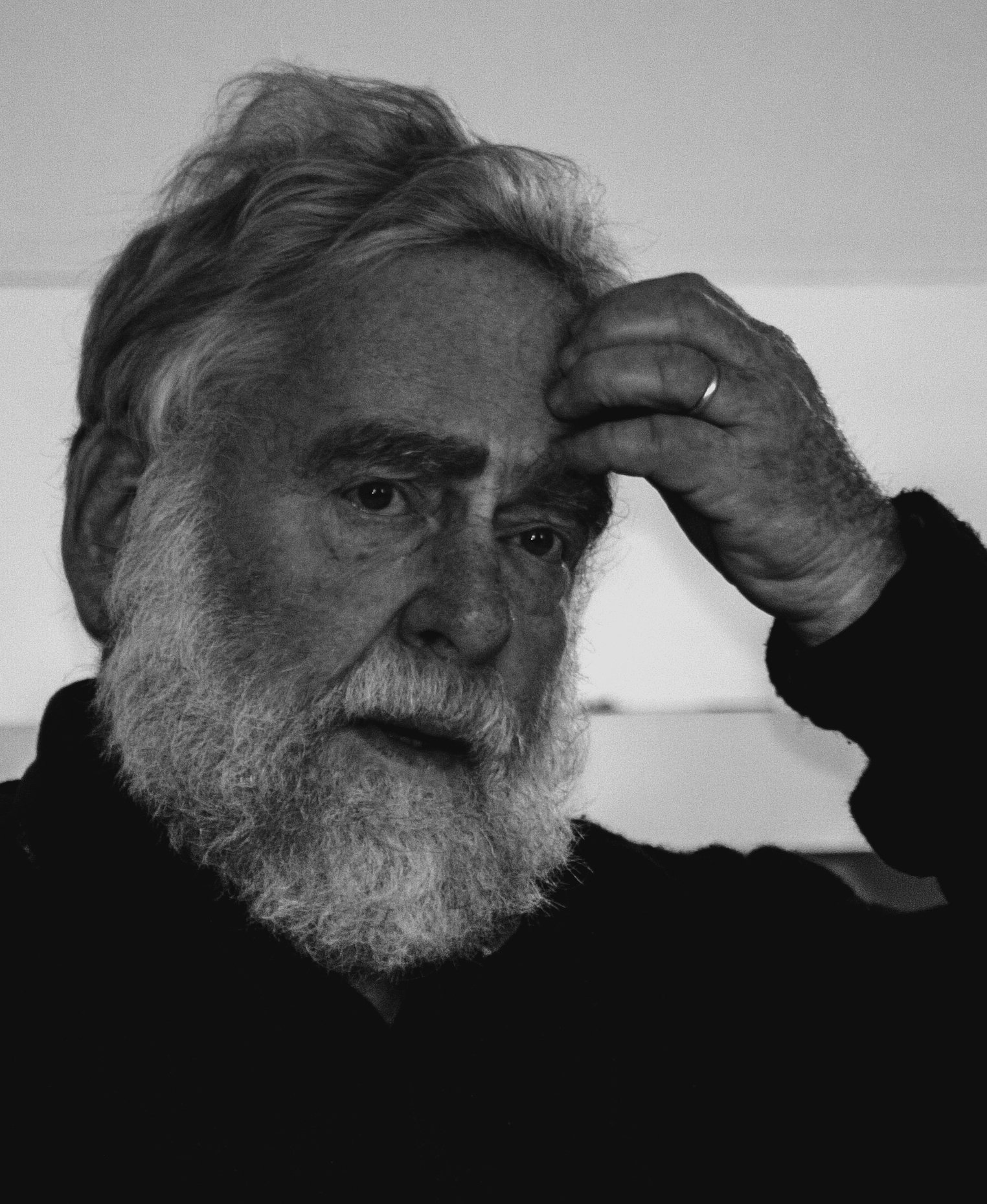
- Born: Jean-Gabriel Cohn-Bendit; 14 April 1936; Montrouge, France
- Died: 17 December 2021 (aged 85); Toulouse, France
- Occupations: Activist, professor
- Relatives: Daniel Cohn-Bendit (brother)

Gabriel Cohn-Bendit (14 April 1936 – 17 December 2021) was a French activist and academic. He frequented anarchist circles and was part of the far-left in the 1960s and 1970s while later joining the Socialist Party and The Greens.

== Biography ==
Gabriel was the son of lawyer Eric Cohn-Bendit and jurist Herta Cohn-Bendit, both German Jews who had fled following the rise of Nazi Germany and Adolf Hitler. He grew up in the 15th arrondissement of Paris, sharing a neighborhood with Walter Benjamin, Hannah Arendt, and Max Ophüls. He became a French citizen after World War II, unlike his brother, Daniel, who opted for German citizenship until 2015.

During World War II, Cohn-Bendit's parents took refuge in Montauban, with his mother serving as treasurer of the Maison des enfants de Moissac. From 1943 to 1944, he lived in hiding with a family of the French Resistance under the false identity of a Belgian refugee. He returned to Paris in 1947 to live with his paternal grandmother. His parents returned the following year, but moved to Germany where his father continued to practice law. He studied at the Lycée Buffon and was notably the classmate of Laurent Terzieff, Philippe Robrieux, Alain Lancelot, and Jean-François Burgelin.

After secondary school, Cohn-Bendit studied philosophy, influenced by Jean-Paul Sartre, who also inspired him to join the French Communist Party. He then joined the Socialisme ou Barbarie movement, headed by Cornelius Castoriadis. In 1959, he moved to Saint-Nazaire after his wife obtained a job there, and he earned a degree in German, subsequently becoming a secondary school teacher of the language. At the time, Socialisme ou Barbarisme was involved in the 1955 Saint-Nazaire strikes. He integrated into his community by meeting local leftist activists, such as Alexandre Hébert of the Workers' Force. In 1962, he joined the Unified Socialist Party. Cohn-Bendit served as national leader of the École émancipée from 1973 to 1975. However, he soon after departed from many of the leftist organizations, such as the Syndicat national des enseignements de second degré.

After the election of François Mitterrand in 1981, Cohn-Bendit successfully advocated for the opening of the Lycée expérimental de Saint-Nazaire. He taught there until 1987, when he left France for Ouagadougou to serve as a German teacher. However, he was unable to settle into Burkina Faso and returned to France and founded the Groupement des retraités éducateurs sans frontières. In 2009, he applied for Burkinabè citizenship, which he acquired the following year. Throughout his later career, he was known as a "tireless activist of alternative education". In 2003, he participated in the Conseil national de l'innovation pour la réussite scolaire, where his ideas led to the establishment of the "Réseau éducation pour tous en Afrique".

Cohn-Bendit died in Toulouse on 17 December 2021, at the age of 85.

== Publications ==
- (with Daniel Cohn-Bendit) Le Gauchisme, remède à la maladie sénile du communisme (1968)
- Intolérable intolérance (1981)
- Nous sommes en marche (1999)
- L'École doit éduquer à la désobéissance : le lycée expérimental de Saint-Nazaire (2001)
- Lettre ouverte à tous ceux qui n'aiment pas l'école (2003)
- École de Tersac, Lycée de Saint-Nazaire : Alternatives à l'Education nationale (2006)
- À bas le Parti Vert! Vive l'écologie! (2011)
- Pour une autre école, Repenser l’éducation, vite ! (2013)
