= Canton of Moissac =

Canton of France

Coordinates: 44.10°N 1.09°E

The canton of Moissac is an administrative division of the Tarn-et-Garonne department, in southern France. It was created at the French canton reorganisation which came into effect in March 2015. Its seat is in Moissac.

It consists of the following communes:

1. Lizac
2. Moissac
3. Montesquieu
