= Nina Gourfinkel =

Russian Jewish writer

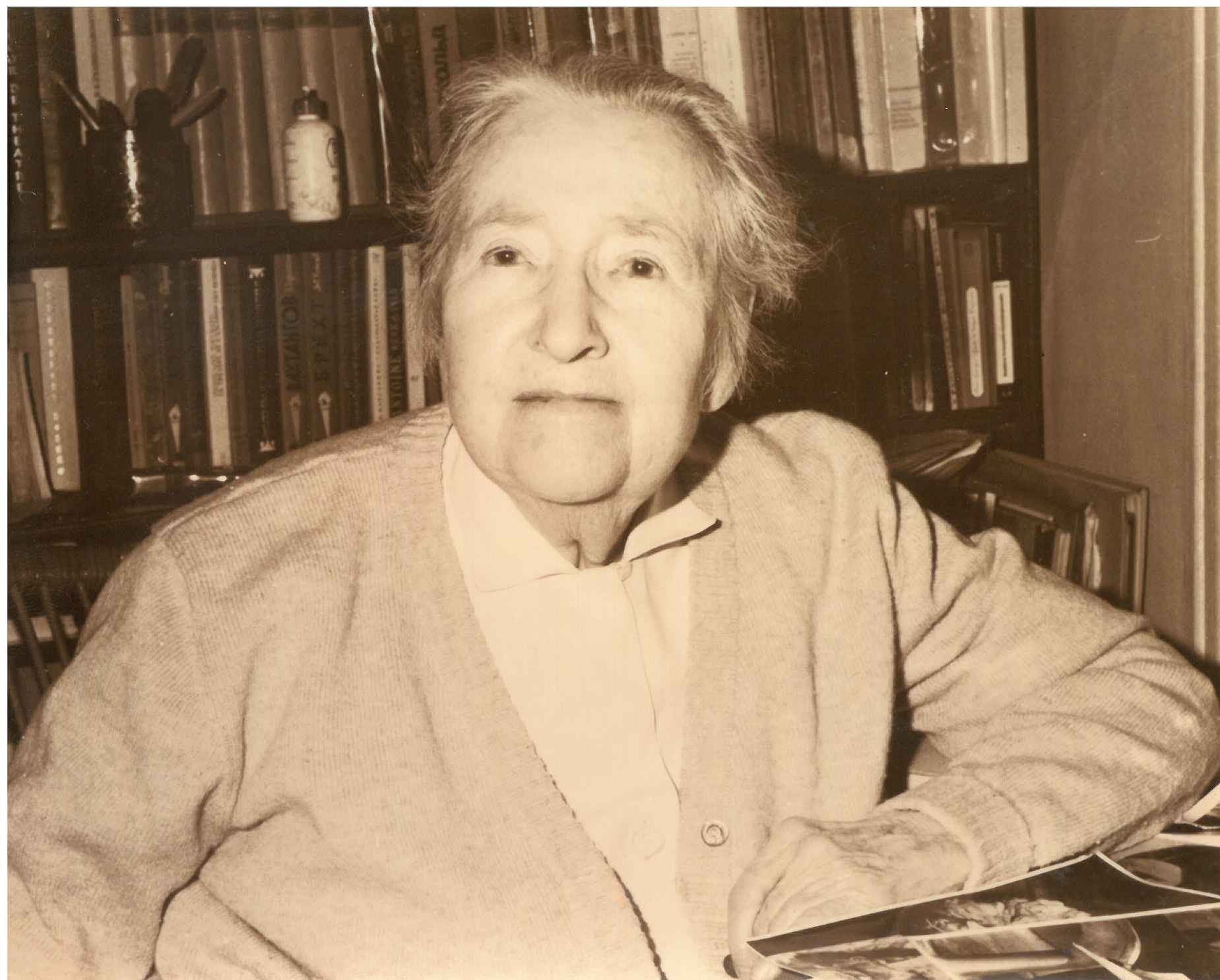
Nina Gourfinkel

Nina Lazavrevna Gourfinkel or Gurfinkel (1898 – 1984) was a Russian Jewish writer living in France. During World War II she worked to provide housing for Jews and other displaced people in the Zone libre. She wrote on Russian theatre and literature, with translations and biographies of Tolstoy, Dostoyevsky, Stanislavski, Gogol, Lenin, Maxim Gorky and Chekhov.

== Life ==
Nina Gourfinkel was born to Jewish parents in Odessa. Her sister was the journalist, writer and translator Juliette Pary. Her father was a doctor who had previously practiced in Saint Petersburg. She studied in Russia, where she was a close friend of Lydia Ginzburg.

In 1925 Gourfinkel moved to Paris. One of her first publications introduced Russian formalism to French literary criticism, and her later book on Tolstoy was influenced by the work of OPOJAZ members Boris Eikhenbaum and Viktor Shklovsky. She was a friend of Irène Némirovsky, and established herself as an expert on contemporary Russian theatre.

In summer 1940 Gourfinkel started working to provide relief for people displaced by World War II. In 1941, together with Joseph Weill of OSE and Alexandre Glasberg, she helped found an organization providing hostels in the Zone libre for men and women, mostly Jews, who had been released from French internment camps. She continued working for the organization in Lyon after the war.

== Works ==
- 'Les nouvelles méthodes d'histoire littéraire en Russie', Le Monde Slave, Vol. 6 (1929), pp.234-263
- Théâtre russe contemporain [Contemporary Russian theatre]. Paris: Albert, 1930
- (tr. with Léon Chancerel) Ma vie dans l'art by Konstantin Stanislavski. Paris: Ed. Albert, 1934.
- Tolstoï sans tolstoïsme [Tolstoy without Tolstoyism]. Paris: Éditions du Seuil, 1946
- (tr. with Dominique Arban) Correspondance de Dostoievski: Première traduction intégrale et conforme au texte russe [Correspondence of Dostoyevsky: a first complete translation in accordance with the Russian text]. Paris : Calman-Lévy, 1949. 4 vols.
- Aux prises avec mon temps [Struggles with my time]. Paris: Éditions du Seuil, 1953. Vol. 1 Naissance d'un monde [Birth of a world]; vol. 2 L'autre patrie [The other homeland].
- Constantin Stanislavski. Paris: L'Arche, 1955
- Nicolas Gogol, dramaturge. Paris: L'Arche, 1956.
- (tr. with Jacques Mauclair) Ivanov by Anton Chekhov. In Théâtre complet, Vol. 1. Paris : L'Arche,, 1958
- Lenin. New York: Grove Press, 1961. Translated by Maurice Thornton from the French Lénine.
- Gorky. New York: Grove Press, 1960. Translated by Ann Feshbach from the French.
- Dostoïevski, notre contemporain [Dostoyevsky our contemporary]. Paris: Calmann-Lévy, 1961
- (tr. and ed.) Le théâtre théâtral [Theatrical theatre] by Vsevolod Meyerhold. Paris: Gallimard, 1963.
- Anton Tchékhov: textes de Tchékhov, documents, chronologie, répertoire des oeuvres, bibliographie, illustrations. Paris: Seghers, 1966
