= Moissac =

- Commune
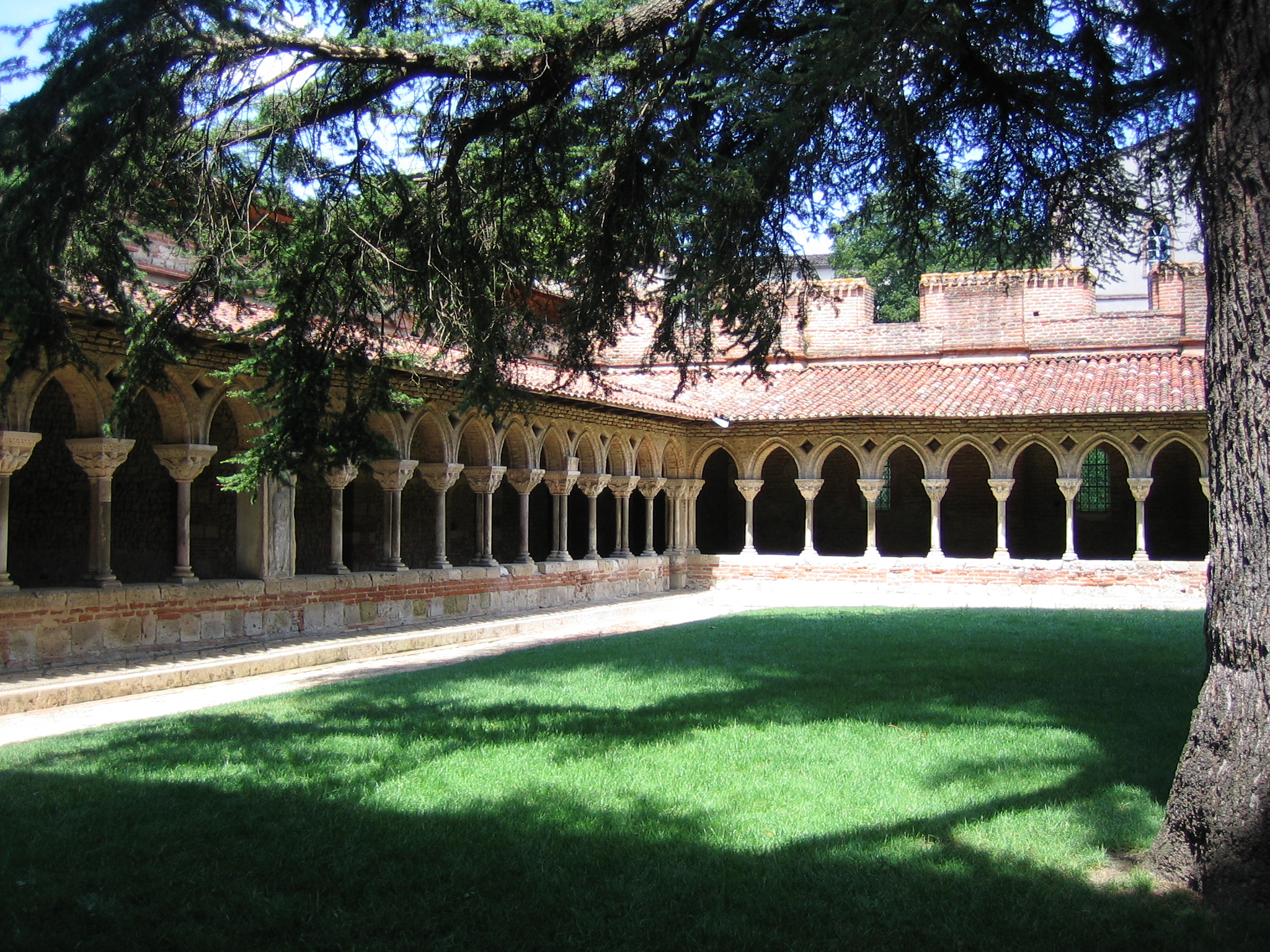
- Cloister of the Saint-Pierre abbey

- Coat of arms
- Location of Moissac
- Location within France Location within Occitanie
- Coordinates: 44°06′20″N 1°05′10″E
- Country: France
- Region: Occitania
- Department: Tarn-et-Garonne
- Arrondissement: Castelsarrasin
- Canton: Moissac

Government
  - Mayor (2020–2026): Romain Lopez (RN)
- Area^{1}: 85.95 km^{2} (33.19 sq mi)
- Elevation: 76 m (249 ft)
- Highest elevation: 199 m (653 ft)
- Lowest elevation: 59 m (194 ft)
- Population (2023): 13,419
  - Density: 156.1/km^{2} (404.4/sq mi)
- Time zone: UTC+01:00 (CET)
  - Summer (DST): UTC+02:00 (CEST)
- INSEE/Postal code: 82112 /82200
- ^{1} French Land Register data, which excludes lakes, ponds, glaciers > 1 km^{2} (0.386 sq mi or 247 acres) and river estuaries.

Moissac (French pronunciation: [mwasak]) is a commune in the Tarn-et-Garonne department in the Occitanie region in southern France. The town is situated at the confluence of the rivers Garonne and Tarn at the Canal de Garonne. Route nationale N113 was constructed through the town and between Valence-d'Agen and Castelsarrasin. It is served by Moissac station on the Bordeaux-Toulouse line.

== History ==
Initially Moissac was part of the department of Lot. In 1808, Napoleon decreed the city be attached to the new department of Tarn-et-Garonne. It was the chief town of the district from 1800 to 1926.

Moissac was heavily damaged in March 1930 by flooding of the Tarn, which devastated much of southwestern France. It was counted as a 100-year flood. One hundred twenty people were reported to have died in the city.

At the beginning of the Second World War, Senator-Mayor Roger Delthil, encouraged the people of the town to welcome refugees from bombarded cities in the north of France. In a house requisitioned by Roger Delthil, a home for Jewish Children separated from their parents was set up at 18, Quai du Port, by the Éclaireurs israélites de France, the French Jewish scout movement. Run by the scout leaders Shatta and Bouli Simon, it benefited from the protection of many of the people of Moissac, including officials at the town hall, and helped to save many hundreds of young Jewish lives. Ten men and women of Moissac have been recognised by Yad Vashem as Righteous Among the Nations for the help they gave in saving Jewish children from deportation.

In 2020, National Rally politician Romain Lopez was elected mayor.

== Moissac Abbey ==
Moissac is known internationally for the artistic heritage preserved in the medieval Moissac Abbey. This church is a site on the World Heritage Site Routes of Santiago de Compostela in France.

Saint-Pierre Church, former abbey church with the portal (1130), one of the masterpieces of Romanesque sculpture. All that remains of the 11th-century building is the massive bell tower-porch, a sort of keep with a walkway, built for defensive purposes but whose top floor only dates from the end of the Gothic period.

== Sights ==
- Church of Saint-Martin de Moissac. Parts of the church date from the 3rd century. The church has preserved paintings from the XIVth century. The church was classified as a historic monument in 1922.
- Church of Saint-Michel de Moissac. The old Saint-Michel de Moissac church located at 49 rue Malaveille, mentioned in 1073, but its origin can be older.

== Population ==
Historical population
| Year | Pop. | ±% p.a. |
|---|---|---|
| 1968 | 11,856 | — |
| 1975 | 11,826 | −0.04% |
| 1982 | 11,184 | −0.79% |
| 1990 | 11,971 | +0.85% |
| 1999 | 12,321 | +0.32% |
| 2007 | 12,377 | +0.06% |
| 2012 | 12,470 | +0.15% |
| 2017 | 13,039 | +0.90% |
| 2023 | 13,419 | +0.48% |
Source: INSEE

== Waterways ==
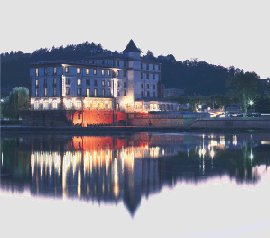
Hotel le Moulin de Moissac, in operation since 1474.

There are important waterways in Moissac: the Tarn flows through the centre of town, as does the Canal de Garonne (formerly Canal latéral à la Garonne), the extension of the Canal du Midi from Toulouse to Bordeaux. Together, these two canals are sometimes known as the Canal des deux mers (lit. canal of the two seas) connecting the Atlantic Ocean with the Mediterranean Sea.

== Twin towns ==
- Astorga, Spain

== See also ==
- Communes of the Tarn-et-Garonne department
- André Abbal
