= Second Valls government =

38th Government of the French Fifth Republic

- 38th Government of France

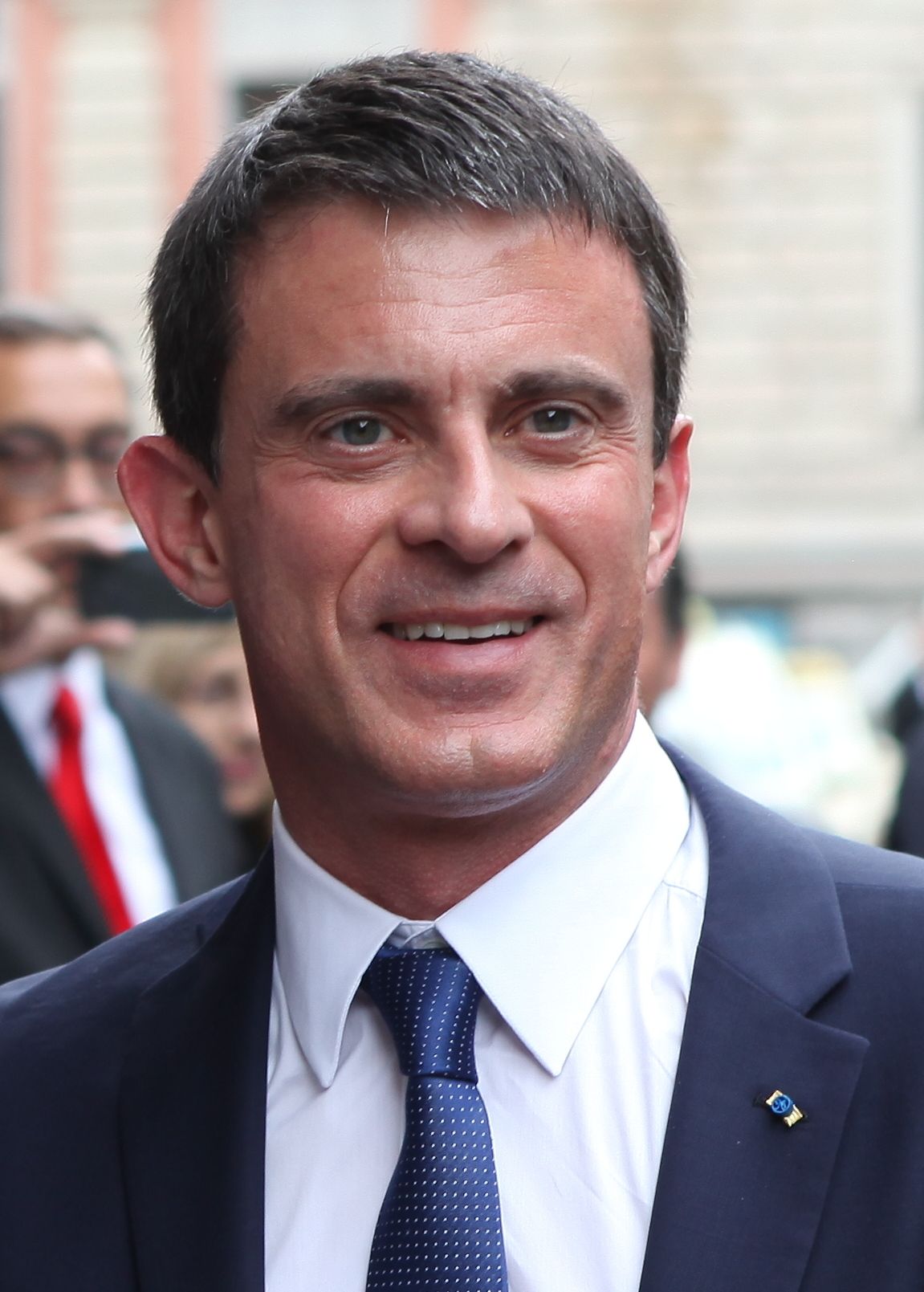
- Manuel Valls
- Date formed: 27 August 2014
- Date dissolved: 6 December 2016

People and organisations
- Head of state: François Hollande
- Head of government: Manuel Valls
- No. of ministers: 16
- Member parties: Socialist Party; Radical Party of the Left; After 11 February 2016 : Socialist Party; Radical Party of the Left; Écologistes !
- Status in legislature: Majority

History
- Predecessor: First Valls government
- Successor: Cazeneuve government

The Second Valls government was the thirty-eighth government in the French Fifth Republic.

It was led by Manuel Valls, who was appointed Prime Minister of France on 27 August 2014; it consisted of 15 ministers from the Socialist Party (PS) and 2 from the Radical Party of the Left (PRG).

Following Valls's decision to focus on his campaign for the Socialist Party presidential primary, he resigned from his functions on 6 December 2016. The government was succeeded by the Cazeneuve government.

In 2014, the government faced the challenges in unifying a divided Socialist Party and addressing France's economic issues.

Because of the upcoming regional elections in December 2015, Valls faced internal criticism, particularly over his economic reforms, including business-friendly tax cuts. In his speech at the Socialist Party's convention in August 2015, Valls highhilghted the need for "visibility" and "predictability" in the government's actions, trying to find the support of his reforms from the Socialists. However, the criticism inside the party and the government continued and was exacerbated by Economy Minister Emmanuel Macron, who criticised some past socialist economic policies, including the controversial 35-hour workweek.

== Prime minister ==
Post	Name	Party
Prime Minister	Manuel Valls	PS

== Ministers ==
	Post	Name	Party
	Minister of Foreign Affairs and International Development	Laurent Fabius (until 11 February 2016); Jean-Marc Ayrault (from 11 February 2016)	PS
	Minister of Ecology, Sustainable Development and Energy	Ségolène Royal	PS
	Minister of National Education, Higher Education and Research	Najat Vallaud-Belkacem	PS
Christiane Taubira	Minister of Justice; Keeper of the Seals	Christiane Taubira (until 27 January 2016); Jean-Jacques Urvoas (from 27 January 2016)	Walwari (app. PRG); PS
	Minister of Finance and the Economy	Michel Sapin	PS
	Minister of Economy, Industry and Digital Affairs	Emmanuel Macron (until 30 August 2016)	Ind.
	Minister of Social Affairs, Health	Marisol Touraine	PS
François Rebsamen	Minister of Labour, Employment and Social Dialogue	François Rebsamen (until 2 September 2015); Myriam El Khomri (from 2 September 2015)	PS
	Minister of Defence	Jean-Yves Le Drian	PS
	Minister of the Interior	Bernard Cazeneuve	PS
	Minister of the Urbanity, Youth Affairs and Sports	Patrick Kanner	PS
	Minister of Decentralisation, State Reform and Public Service	Marylise Lebranchu (until 11 February 2016); Annick Girardin (from 11 February 2016)	PS; PRG
	Minister of Culture and Communication	Fleur Pellerin (until 11 February 2016); Audrey Azoulay (from 11 February 2016)	PS
	Minister of Agriculture, Agrifood and Forestry, Government Spokesperson	Stéphane Le Foll	PS
	Minister of Housing and Territorial Development	Sylvia Pinel (until 11 February 2016); Emmanuelle Cosse (from 11 February 2016)	PRG; Écologistes !
	Minister of Overseas France	George Pau-Langevin (until 30 August 2016); Ericka Bareigts (from 30 August 2016)	PS
	Minister of Spatial Planning and Rurality (from 11 February 2016)	Jean-Michel Baylet	PRG
	Minister for Family, Children and Women's Rights	Laurence Rossignol	PS

=== Secretaries of State ===
Post	Ministry	Name	Party
Secretary of State for Relations with Parliament	Prime Minister	Jean-Marie Le Guen	PS
Secretary of State for State Reform and Simplification	Prime Minister	Thierry Mandon (until 17 June 2015); Clotilde Valter (17 June 2015 to 11 February 2016); Jean-Vincent Placé (from 11 February 2016)	PS; Écologistes !
Secretary of State for European Affairs	Minister of Foreign Affairs and International Development	Harlem Désir	PS
Secretary of State Development and Francophonie	Minister of Foreign Affairs and International Development	Annick Girardin (until 11 February 2016); André Vallini (from 11 February 2016)	PRG; PS
Secretary of State for Foreign Trade, Tourism and French overseas	Minister of Foreign Affairs and International Development	Thomas Thévenoud (until 4 September 2014); Matthias Fekl (from 4 September 2014)	PS
Secretary of State for Transport, Marine and Fisheries	Ecology, Sustainable Development and Energy	Alain Vidalies	PS
Secretary of State for real equality (from 11 February 2016)	Prime Minister	Ericka Bareigts	PS
Secretary of State Aid Victims (from 11 February 2016 to 30 August 2016)	Prime Minister	Juliette Méadel	PS
Secretary of State for Higher Education and Research	Minister of National Education, Higher Education and Research	Geneviève Fioraso (until 17 June 2015); Thierry Mandon (from 17 June 2015)	PS
Secretary of State for the Budget	Minister of Finance and the Economy	Christian Eckert	PS
Secretary of State for Veterans	Defence	Kader Arif (until 21 November 2014); Jean-Marc Todeschini (from 21 November 2014)	PS
Secretary of State for Vocational Training and Apprenticeship (from 11 February 2016)	Minister of Labour, Employment and Social Dialogue	Clotilde Valter	PS
State Secretary for the Disabled and against Social Exclusion	Minister of Social Affairs, Health and Women's Rights	Ségolène Neuville	PS
Secretary of State for Seniors and Autonomy (from 11 February 2016)	Minister of Social Affairs, Health	Pascale Boistard	PS
Secretary of State for Trade, Crafts, Consumer and Social Economy and Solidarity	Minister of Finance and the Economy	Carole Delga (until 17 June 2015); Martine Pinville (from 17 June 2015)	PS
State Secretary for Digital Affairs and Innovation	Minister of Finance and the Economy	Axelle Lemaire	PS
Secretary of State for International Relations Climate and Biodiversity (from 11 February 2016)	Minister of Ecology, Sustainable Development and Energy	Barbara Pompili	Écologistes !
Secretary of State for Sports	Minister of Women's Rights, Urbanity, Youth Affairs and Sport	Thierry Braillard	PRG
Secretary of State of the City (from 11 February 2016)	Minister of the Urbanity, Youth Affairs and Sports	Hélène Geoffroy	PS
Secretary of State for Local Authorities (from 11 February 2016)	Minister of Spatial Planning and Rurality	Estelle Grelier	PS
Secretary of State for Industry (from 1 September 2016)	Minister of Finance and the Economy	Christophe Sirugue	PS

== Changes ==
- On 4 September 2014, Thomas Thévenoud, Secretary of State for Foreign Trade, Tourism and French overseas, resigns following problems with the tax authorities. He is replaced by Matthias Fekl.
- On 21 November 2014, Kader Arif, Secretary of State for Veterans, resigns following an investigation into public procurement awards. He is replaced by Jean-Marc Todeschini.
- On 17 June 2015, Geneviève Fioraso, Secretary of State for Higher Education and Research, resigned for health reasons. She is replaced by Thierry Mandon. The latter, until now Secretary of State for State Reform and Simplification, is himself replaced by Clotilde Valter. Carole Delga, Secretary of State for Trade, Crafts, Consumer and Social Economy and Solidarity, resigns. She is a candidate for regional elections in Occitanie. She is replaced by Martine Pinville.
- On 2 September 2015, François Rebsamen, Minister of Labour, Employment and Social Dialogue, announced his resignation following his election as mayor of Dijon. He is replaced by Myriam El Khomri.
- On 27 January 2016, Christiane Taubira, Minister of Justice and Keeper of the Seals, announced his resignation. She is replaced by Jean-Jacques Urvoas.
- On 11 February 2016, Laurent Fabius, Minister of Foreign Affairs and International Development, resigns following his election as president of Constitutional Council . He is replaced by Jean-Marc Ayrault, former prime minister. Marylise Lebranchu, Minister of Decentralisation, State Reform and Public Service, is replaced by Annick Girardin. The latter, until now Secretary of State Development and Francophonie, is himself replaced by André Vallini. Fleur Pellerin, Minister of Culture and Communication, is replaced by Audrey Azoulay. Sylvia Pinel, Minister of Housing and Territorial Development, announced his resignation following his election as vice-president of Regional council of Occitanie. She is replaced by Emmanuelle Cosse. Clotilde Valter, Secretary of State for State Reform and Simplification becomes Secretary of State for Vocational Training and Apprenticeship. She is replaced by Jean-Vincent Placé.
- On 27 January 2016, George Pau-Langevin, Minister of Overseas France, resigned. She is replaced by Ericka Bareigts. Emmanuel Macron, Minister of Economy, Industry and Digital Affairs, announced his resignation following to devote himself to his political movement, En Marche!.

Preceded by First Valls government	Government of France; 2014–2016	Succeeded by Cazeneuve government
