= Cazeneuve government =

39th government in the Fifth Republic of France

- 39th Government of France

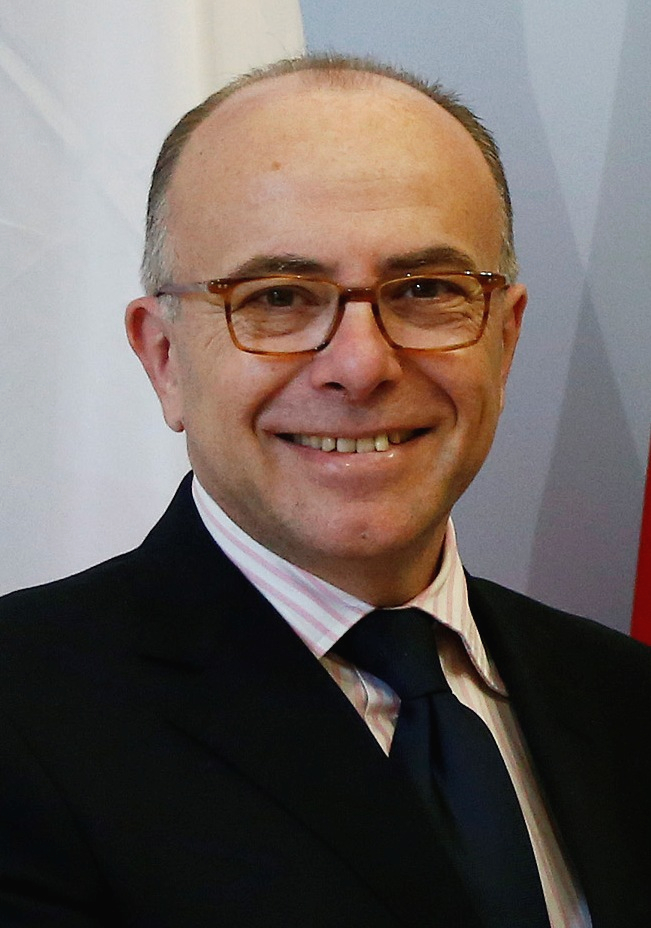
- Bernard Cazeneuve
- Date formed: 6 December 2016
- Date dissolved: 15 May 2017

People and organisations
- Head of state: François Hollande
- Head of government: Bernard Cazeneuve
- No. of ministers: 18
- Member parties: Socialist Party; Radical Party of the Left; Ecologist Party
- Status in legislature: Majority

History
- Predecessor: Second Valls government
- Successor: First Philippe government

The Cazeneuve government (French: Gouvernement Bernard Cazeneuve) was the thirty-ninth government in the Fifth Republic of France. It was led by Bernard Cazeneuve who was appointed Prime Minister of France on 6 December 2016. It consisted of 15 ministers from the Socialist Party (PS), two from the Radical Party of the Left (PRG) and one from Ecologist Party (PE).

Ahead of 2017 presidential election, incumbent President François Hollande announced he would not run for a second presidential term after which incumbent Prime Minister Manuel Valls announced his candidacy at the 2017 Socialist Party presidential primary election and resignation from the position of the Prime Minister the following day. Bernard Cazeneuve, who served as Minister of the Interior under Valls, was appointed head of a new government which resumed almost entirely the composition of the preceding one.

== Members ==
=== Prime minister ===
Post	Name	Party
Prime Minister	Bernard Cazeneuve	PS

=== Ministers ===
Post	Name	Party
Minister of Foreign Affairs and International Development	Jean-Marc Ayrault	PS
Minister of Ecology, Sustainable Development and Energy	Ségolène Royal	PS
Minister of National Education, Higher Education and Research	Najat Vallaud-Belkacem	PS
Minister of Justice; Keeper of the Seals	Jean-Jacques Urvoas	PS
Minister of Finance and the Economy	Michel Sapin	PS
Minister of Social Affairs and Health	Marisol Touraine	PS
Minister of Labour, Employment and Social Dialogue	Myriam El Khomri	PS
Minister of Defence	Jean-Yves Le Drian	PS
Minister of the Interior	Bruno Le Roux (until 21 March 2017); Matthias Fekl (from 21 March 2017)	PS
Minister of the City, Youth and Sports	Patrick Kanner	PS
Minister of Decentralisation, State Reform and Public Service	Annick Girardin	PRG
Minister of Culture and Communication	Audrey Azoulay	Ind.
Minister of Agriculture, Agrifood and Forestry; Government Spokesman	Stéphane Le Foll	PS
Minister of Housing and Territorial Development	Emmanuelle Cosse	PE
Minister of Overseas France	Ericka Bareigts	PS
Minister of Spatial Planning, Rurality and Territorial Collectivities	Jean-Michel Baylet	PRG
Minister of Family, Children and Women's Rights	Laurence Rossignol	PS

=== Secretaries of State ===
Post	Ministry	Name	Party
Secretary of State for Relations with Parliament	Prime Minister	André Vallini	PS
Secretary of State for State Reform and Simplification	Prime Minister	Jean-Vincent Placé	PE
Secretary of State for Aid to Victims	Prime Minister	Juliette Méadel	PS
Secretary of State for European Affairs	Minister of Foreign Affairs and International Development	Harlem Désir	PS
Secretary of State for Development and Francophonie	Minister of Foreign Affairs and International Development	Jean-Marie Le Guen	PS
Secretary of State for Foreign Trade, Tourism and French citizens abroad	Minister of Foreign Affairs and International Development	Matthias Fekl (until 21 March 2017)	PS
Secretary of State for Transport, the Sea and Fisheries	Minister of Ecology, Sustainable Development and Energy	Alain Vidalies	PS
Secretary of State for Biodiversity	Minister of Ecology, Sustainable Development and Energy	Barbara Pompili	PE
Secretary of State for Higher Education and Research	Minister of National Education, Higher Education and Research	Thierry Mandon	PS
Secretary of State for the Budget	Minister of Finance and the Economy	Christian Eckert	PS
Secretary of State for Trade, Crafts, Consumption and the Social and Solidarity Economy	Minister of Finance and the Economy	Martine Pinville	PS
Secretary of State for Digital Affairs and Innovation (until 27 February 2017)	Minister of Finance and the Economy	Axelle Lemaire	PS
Secretary of State for Industry (until 27 February 2017); Secretary of State for Industry, Digital Affairs and Innovation (from 27 February 2017)	Minister of Finance and the Economy	Christophe Sirugue	PS
Secretary of State for Disabled People and the Fight against Exclusion	Minister of Social Affairs and Health	Ségolène Neuville	PS
Secretary of State for Seniors and Autonomy	Minister of Social Affairs and Health	Pascale Boistard	PS
Secretary of State for Veterans	Minister of Defence	Jean-Marc Todeschini	PS
Secretary of State for Vocational Training and Apprenticeship	Minister of Labour, Employment and Social Dialogue	Clotilde Valter	PS
Secretary of State for Local Authorities	Minister of Spatial Planning, Rurality and Territorial Collectivities	Estelle Grelier	PS
Secretary of State for the City	Minister of the City, Youth and Sports	Hélène Geoffroy	PS
Secretary of State for Sports	Minister of the City, Youth and Sports	Thierry Braillard	PRG

== Changes ==
The following changes were made to the Cazeneuve government:

- On 27 February 2017, Axelle Lemaire resigned from her post of Secretary of State for Digital Affairs and Innovation to devote time to the presidential campaign of Benoît Hamon and her candidacy in the upcoming legislative election. The post of Secretary of State for Digital Affairs and Innovation was taken over by Christophe Sirugue.
- On 21 March 2017, Bruno Le Roux resigned from his post of Minister of the Interior, after accusations of alleged fictitious parliamentary assistant jobs held by his minor daughters while he was a member of the National Assembly. He was replaced by the Secretary of State for Foreign Trade, Tourism and French citizens abroad Matthias Fekl. The post of Secretary of State for Foreign Trade, Tourism and French citizens abroad was abolished.

Preceded by Second Valls government	Government of France; 2016–2017	Succeeded by First Philippe government
