= Finance Committee (French National Assembly) =

Standing committee of the French National Assembly

Committee for Finance
- 16th legislature
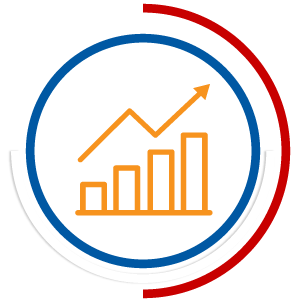

Leadership
- Commission's president: Éric Coquerel, LFI since 30 June 2022
- Rapporteur General of the Budget: Charles de Courson, LIOT since 20 July 2024
- Seats: 73

The Finance, General Economy and Budgetary Monitoring Committee (French: Commission des Finances, de l'Économie générale et du Contrôle budgétaire), known as the Finance Committee, is one of the eight standing committees of the French National Assembly. It is traditionally chaired by a member of the largest opposition party.

== Jurisdiction ==
The powers of the Commission for Economic Affairs are as follows :

- Public finances
- Finance laws
- Programming laws for multi-year public finance guidelines
- Control of budget execution
- Local taxation
- Economic conditions
- Monetary Policy
- Banks
- Insurance
- Domain
- State participation

The reform of the Standing Orders of the National Assembly of May 27, 2009 introduced that the chairmanship of the finance committee is vested in the opposition.

== List of chairmen ==
Portrait	Name	Constituency	Took office	Left office	Political party	Legislature
	Didier Migaud	Isère's 4th constituency	June 28, 2007	February 23, 2010	PS	13th legislature
	Jérôme Cahuzac	Lot-et-Garonne's 3rd constituency	February 24, 2010	June 19, 2012	PS	13th legislature
	Gilles Carrez	Val-de-Marne's 5th constituency	June 28, 2012	June 20, 2017	UMP	14th legislature
	Éric Woerth	Oise's 4th constituency	June 29, 2017	June 21, 2022	LR	15th legislature
	Éric Coquerel	Seine-Saint-Denis's 1st constituency	June 30, 2022	Incumbent	LFI	16th legislature

== Current Bureau's Committee ==
Composition of the bureau
Post	Name	Constituency	Group
Chairman	Éric Coquerel	Seine-Saint-Denis's 1st constituency	LFI
General Reporter	Charles de Courson	Marne's 5th constituency	LIOT
Vice-chair	Nadia Hai	Yvelines's 7th constituency	RE
Vice-chair	François Jolivet	Indre's 1st constituency	HOR
Vice-chair	Véronique Louwagie	Orne's 2nd constituency	LR
Vice-chair	Mohamed Laqhila	Bouches-du-Rhône's 11th constituency	DEM
Secretary	Fabien Di Filippo	Moselle's 4th constituency	LR
Secretary	Marina Ferrari	Savoie's 1st constituency	DEM
Secretary	Christine Pirès-Beaune	Puy-de-Dôme's 2nd constituency	SOC
Secretary	Benjamin Dirx	Saône-et-Loire's 1st constituency	RE
