= Francis Geng =

French politician (1931–2022)

Member of the French National Assembly
- In office 19 March 1978 – 1 April 1993
- Succeeded by: Jean-Claude Lenoir
- Constituency: Orne's 2nd constituency

Personal details
- Born: 23 September 1931 14th arrondissement of Paris, France
- Died: 10 April 2022 (aged 90)
- Party: UDF; CDS

Francis Geng (23 September 1931 – 10 April 2022) was a French politician. A member of the Union for French Democracy, he served in the National Assembly from 1978 to 1993. He died on 10 April 2022 at the age of 90.
