= Jean-Vincent Placé =

French politician (born 1968)

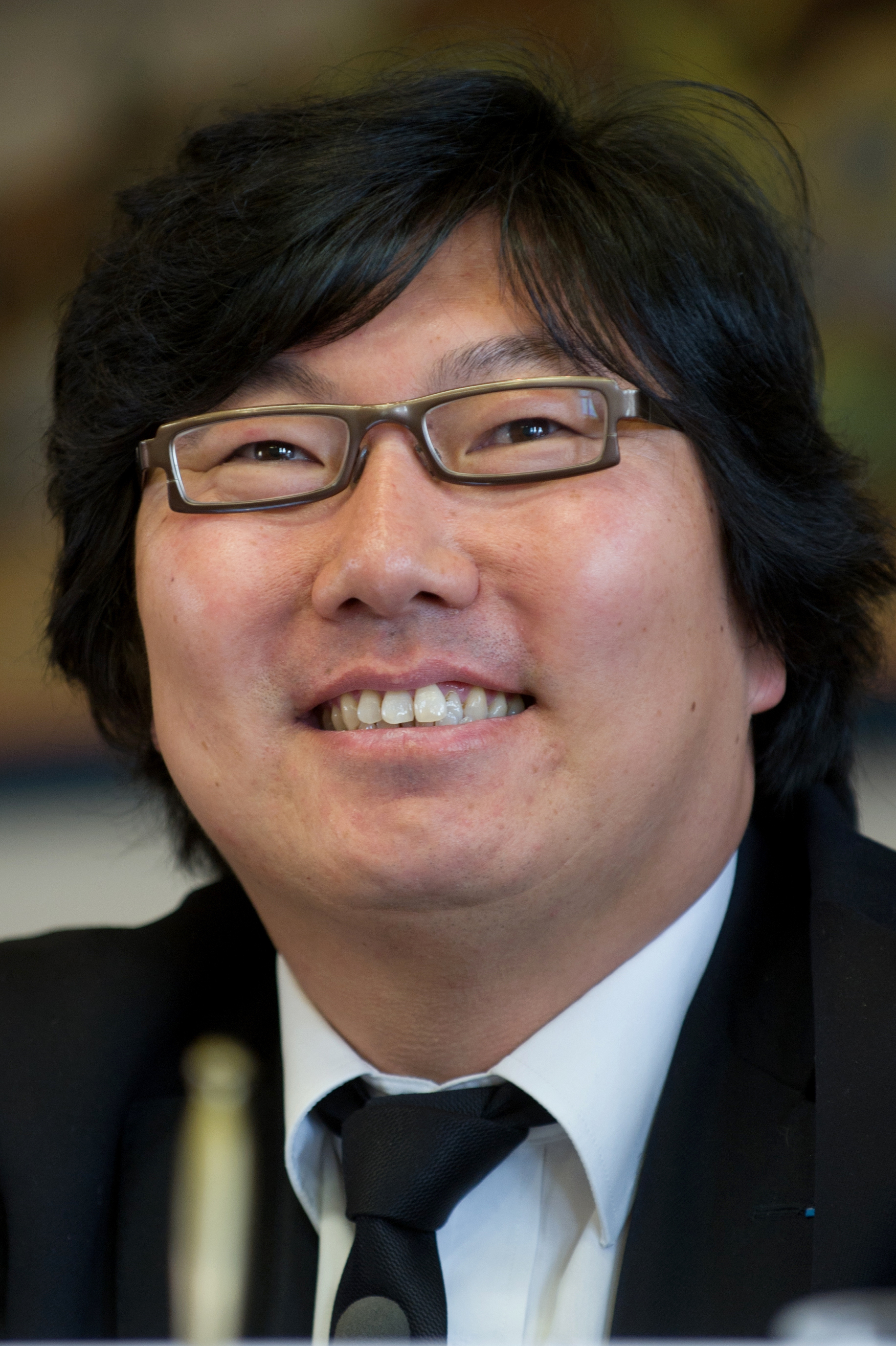

Member of the Regional Council of Île-de-France
- In office 28 March 2004 – 27 June 2021

Senator for Essonne
- In office 18 June 2017 – 1 October 2017
- Preceded by: Bernard Vera
- Parliamentary group: SOC
- In office 1 October 2011 – 11 March 2016
- Succeeded by: Bernard Vera
- Parliamentary group: SOC-EELV (2011–2012); ECOLO (2012–2016)

Secretary of State for State Reform and Simplification
- In office 11 February 2016 – 10 May 2017
- President: François Hollande
- Prime Minister: Manuel Valls; Bernard Cazeneuve
- Preceded by: Clotilde Valter

Personal details
- Born: Kwon Oh bok 12 March 1968 (age 58) Seoul, South Korea
- Party: PRG (1993–2001); The Greens (2001–2010); EELV (2010–2015); PE (2015–present)
- Domestic partner(s): Cécile Duflot; Éva Sas
- Education: University of Caen

Jean-Vincent Placé (born 12 March 1968) is a South Korean-born, French Green politician.

Adopted by a French family as a child, Placé entered politics as a member of the Radical Party of the Left before joining Europe Ecology – The Greens. He and fellow Green François de Rugy left the party in 2015 to found their own Ecologist Party.

He formerly was Senator for the department of Essonne, Secretary of State for State Reform and Simplification in the Second Valls government, and president of political group Union des démocrates et des écologistes.

== Early life and career ==
Little is known about Placé's origins, apart from the fact that he spent part of his childhood in an orphanage in Suwon, South Korea. Although his birth certificate states he was born Kwon Oh-bok (권오복) in Seoul on 12 March 1968, Placé himself has expressed doubts about the date because of his situation as an orphan; at the time of his adoption by a French family in 1975, he reportedly appeared younger than his official age. He then grew up with his adoptive family in Normandy.

After studying economics, Placé, then 26 years old, met La Rochelle mayor and Parliament member Michel Crépeau and became active within his party "Movement of Radicals of the Left" (later Radical Party of the Left). According to L'Obs, Placé also joined the Grand Orient de France, France's largest Masonic organization. He became an attaché to Crépeau until Crépeau's death in 1999, after which Placé left the Radical Party and joined The Greens, which later became Europe Ecology – The Greens (EELV).

== Political career ==
The 2004 French regional elections saw Jean-Vincent Placé being elected as a member of the regional council of Île-de-France, on a list of candidates led by Socialist Jean-Paul Huchon, as the result of an alliance between The Greens and the Socialist Party. Placé was subsequently elected as the head of the Green group within the council.

In 2011, under EELV membership, Placé was elected as senator for the department of Essonne. In 2012, he became the first president of the newly formed Ecologist group in the French Senate.

In 2014, Placé publicly criticized the "leftist" direction his party was allegedly taking and lamented it had become "the party of Romani people and Palestine" instead of focusing on environmental issues. Eventually, in 2015, upset by talks of alliance between EELV and the Left Front for the regional elections, Jean-Vincent Placé and François de Rugy both left EELV and founded their own centre-left, green party, Écologistes ! (later the Ecologist Party). The party then participated in the creation of political group Union des démocrates et des écologistes (UDE) of which Placé became the first president.

From 2016 to 2017, he was appointed by then-Prime Minister Manuel Valls as "Secretary of State for State Reform and Simplification" in Valls's second government. In order to access government office, Placé stepped down from his positions as senator and president of the Senate's Ecologist group.

In 2016, Placé applied for the honorary title of Colonel of the citizen reserve forces within the 13th Parachute Dragoon Regiment.

In December 2016, when Bernard Cazeneuve was appointed prime minister, Placé retained his position within his government as Secretary of State for State Reform and Simplification.

In the 2017 Socialist primaries, Jean-Vincent Placé showed support for former prime minister Manuel Valls, who eventually lost the primary to Benoît Hamon. Placé then backed the Socialist candidate Hamon during the presidential campaign.

Following the formation of Prime Minister Édouard Philippe's first government in 2017, Placé was no longer a member of the French government and took back his position within the Senate, this time as a member of the Socialist and Republican group.

In September 2017, after being mugged in the streets of Paris, he publicly expressed his desire to put his political career on hold, thus declining to stand in the then-upcoming senatorial elections. When Placé made his announcement, his name was not on any candidate list for the Senate. He remained a member of the regional council of Île-de-France.

In April 2018, following issues with alcoholism and a publicized incident in a Paris nightclub, Placé resigned from his position as president of UDE.

== Legal issues ==
In 2011, during an appearance on television, Placé reacted to then-UMP member of Parliament Christian Vanneste's recent comments about same-sex marriage, by calling Vanneste "despicable" and claiming he had a reputation for "homophobic", "racist", "maybe even antisemitic" remarks. Vanneste then sued Placé for defamation. A Paris court eventually sentenced Placé to a €500 fine and ordered him to pay Vanneste €1,500 in damages.

In 2013, an investigation by newspaper Le Canard enchaîné revealed that Placé owed more than €18,000 to the region of Île-de-France, mostly in unpaid traffic fines. Placé, who acknowledged his mistake, explained he was "not a man of numbers" and swore to pay his fines. In 2014, he stormed out of a talk show where the topic was brought up again, saying his situation was now resolved.

In September 2017, Placé was assaulted in the streets of Paris: the robbers took his cellphone, credit card, and €7,000 watch. Placé later told the press he was considering putting his political career on hold.

On the night between 4 and 5 April 2018, an intoxicated Placé was arrested outside a Paris nightclub by French police and kept into custody for 37 hours. He was charged with "disrespect towards police officers", "racial insults" and "violent behavior under the influence", and brought to the courts. Placé then resigned from his position as president of UDE. In an interview with Paris Match, Placé apologized for disorderly intoxication and revealed he had been struggling with alcoholism for several months. However, he denied allegations of any sexist or racist behavior. In September 2018, a Paris court found him guilty of "acts of violence" and gave him a €1,000 fine and a three-month suspended sentence, while dismissing the charge of "racial insults".

== Personal life ==
Although Placé was born in South Korea and spent part of his childhood there, he claims little relation to his birth country and credits his identity to education within the "School of the [French] Republic". After being adopted in 1975 by a French family he describes as politically "Gaullist", he did not set foot in South Korea again until an official visit in 2011. While there, he said to the local press "France is my country" and reportedly told locals he was unable to speak their language.

Placé was previously in a relationship with fellow Green politician Cécile Duflot. After the end of what Placé calls a "love story", he began a relationship with another Green politician, French Parliament member Éva Sas. Together they had a daughter who was born in November 2013. Placé and Sas separated in 2014.

== Authored books ==
- Placé, Jean-Vincent; Geisler, Rodolphe (2015). "Pourquoi pas moi!" (in French). Plon Editions. ISBN 978-2259230117.
