= Jean Lenoir =

Jean Lenoir may refer to:

- Jean-Charles-Pierre Lenoir (1732–1807), French lawyer and policeman
- Jean-Claude Lenoir (born 1944), member of the National Assembly of France
- Jean Lenoir (composer) (1891–1976), French film and popular composer
- Étienne Lenoir (1822–1900), also known as Jean J. Lenoir, built the first practical gas engine
