= Hélène Laporte =

French politician (born 1978)

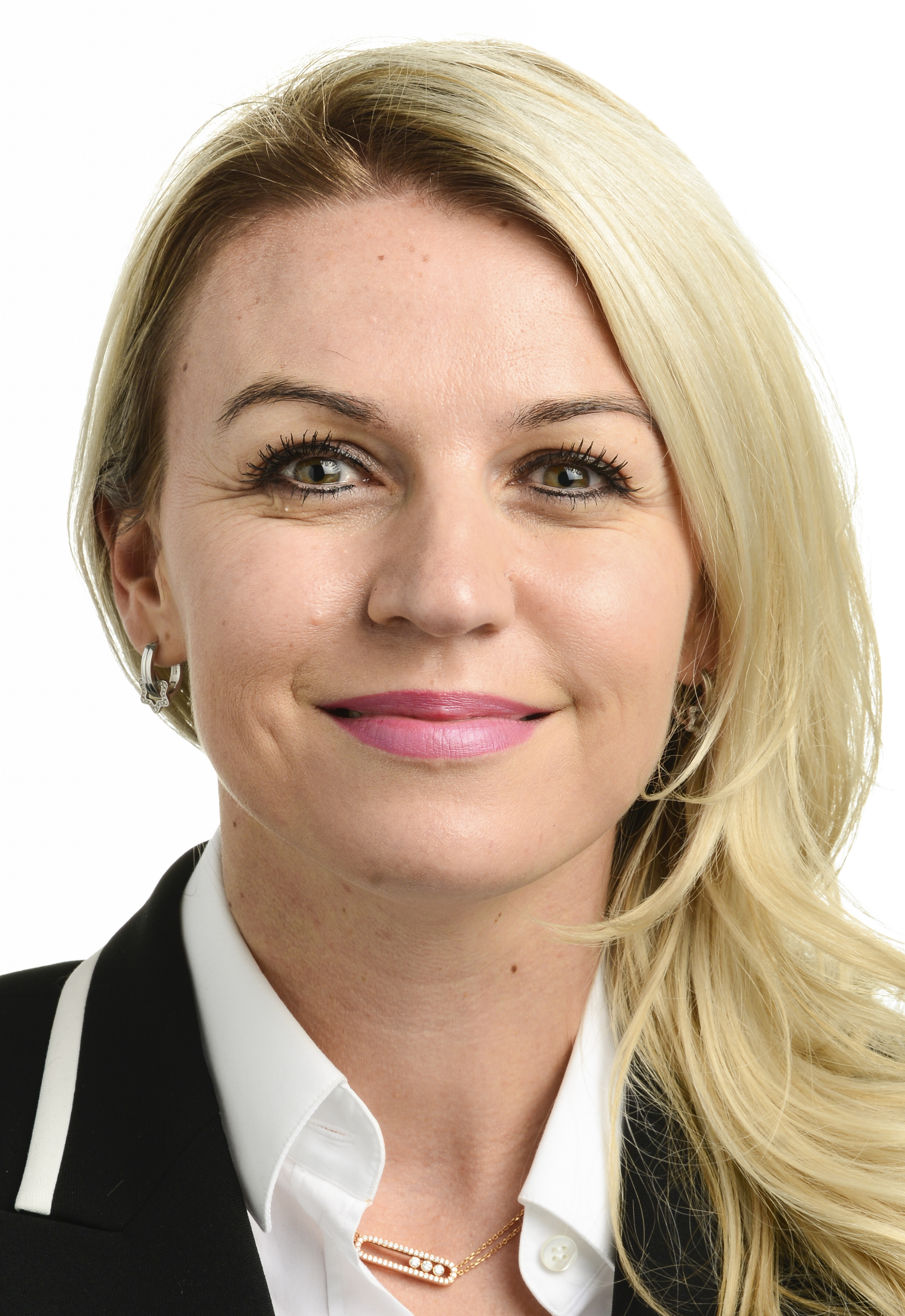

Vice President of the National Assembly
- Incumbent
- Assumed office 29 June 2022

Member of the National Assembly for Lot-et-Garonne's 2nd constituency
- Incumbent
- Assumed office 29 June 2022
- Preceded by: Alexandre Freschi

Member of the European Parliament for France
- In office 2 July 2019 – 28 June 2022
- Succeeded by: Marie Dauchy

Personal details
- Born: 29 December 1978 (age 47) Villeneuve-sur-Lot, France
- Party: National Rally
- Children: 2
- Profession: Politician

Hélène Laporte (French pronunciation: [elɛn lapɔʁt]; born 29 December 1978) is a French politician who was elected as a National Rally (part of the Identity and Democracy) group Member of the European Parliament (MEP) in the 2019 European parliamentary election. She was vice president of the National Assembly from 2022 to 2024.

== Early life and local political career ==
Hélène Laporte was born on 29 December 1978 in Villeneuve-sur-Lot, France. Her mother Isabelle Laporte was elected as a National Front councillor on the Villeneuve municipal council in 2014. Her maternal grandfather Jacques Laporte was a candidate for the National Front in the 1997 French legislative election. She is a banking analyst for Crédit Agricole.

Laporte joined the National Front in 2014. In the 2015 French regional elections, she was elected as a councillor for the party in Lot-et-Garonne. Laporte contested the 2017 French legislative election in Lot-et-Garonne's 2nd constituency. Alexandre Freschi of the La République En Marche! party won the seat after the second round of voting. National Front changed their name to National Rally in June 2018.

== European and national career ==
Laporte stood as a candidate for National Rally in the 2019 European parliamentary election. She was second on her party's list, and was elected as one of its 22 MEPs in France. (Note: In the election, the party won 23 seats however Jean-Lin Lacapelle was elected in a reserve seat that he can only take if the United Kingdom leaves the European Union.) She is part of the Identity and Democracy group. In the European Parliament, Laporte is a member of the Committee on Budgets, and is part of the delegation to the Euro-Latin American Parliamentary Assembly.

She was invited to Russia in 2020 as an "international expert" to observe the constitutional referendum that allowed Vladimir Putin to be candidate to Russian presidential elections until 2036. Despite several allegations of fraud, she called the referendum a "democracy lesson". 10 MEPs from the National Rally were invited to observe this refendum. She also praised the organization of the election in the Russian journal Ria Novosti.

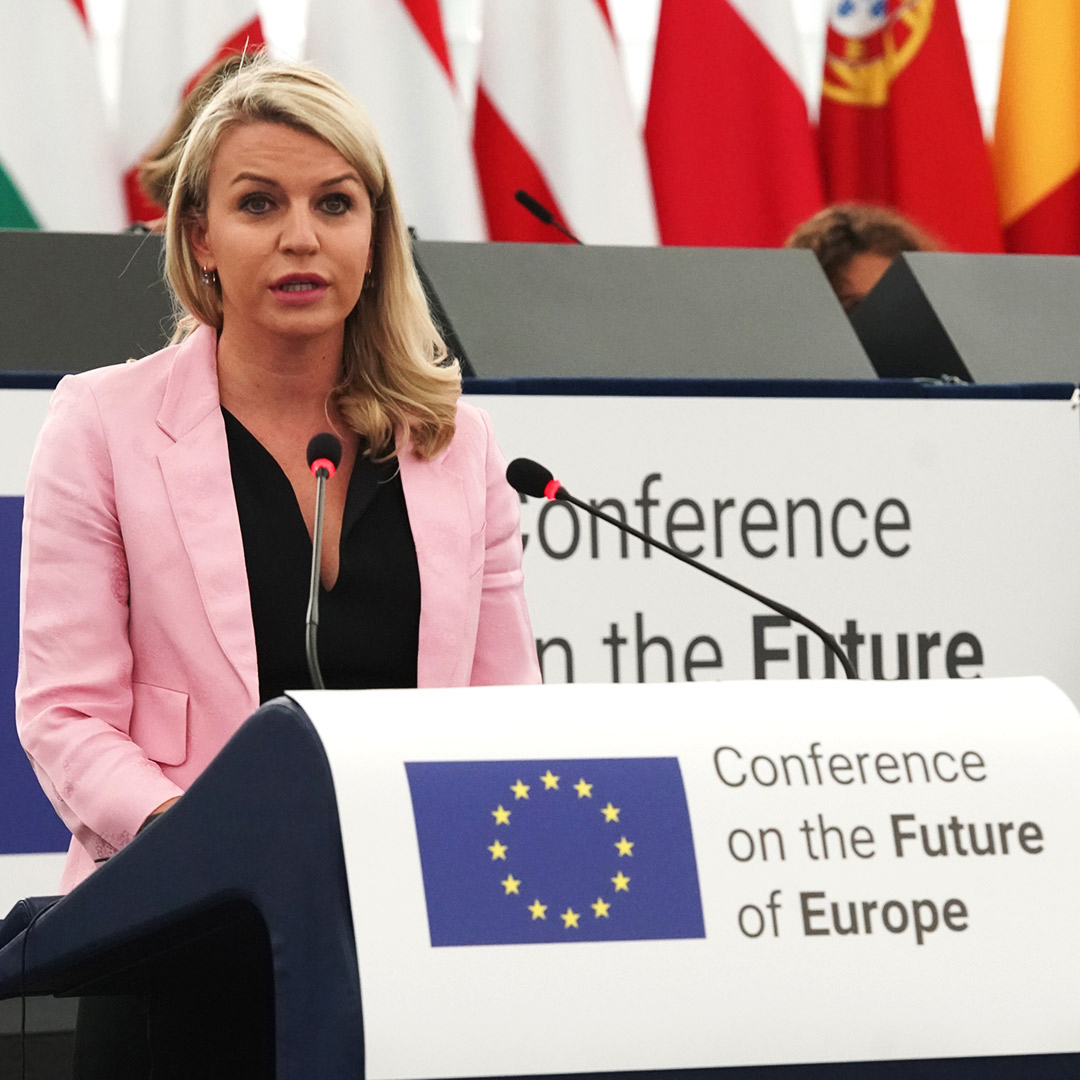
Laporte at the inaugural plenary session of the Conference on the Future of Europe on 13 June 2021 in Strasbourg

She was elected a 2nd constituency during the 2022 French legislative election and has served as vice president of the National Assembly since 29 June 2022.

== Personal life ==
Laporte is married, and has two children.
