= Michel Diefenbacher =

French politician

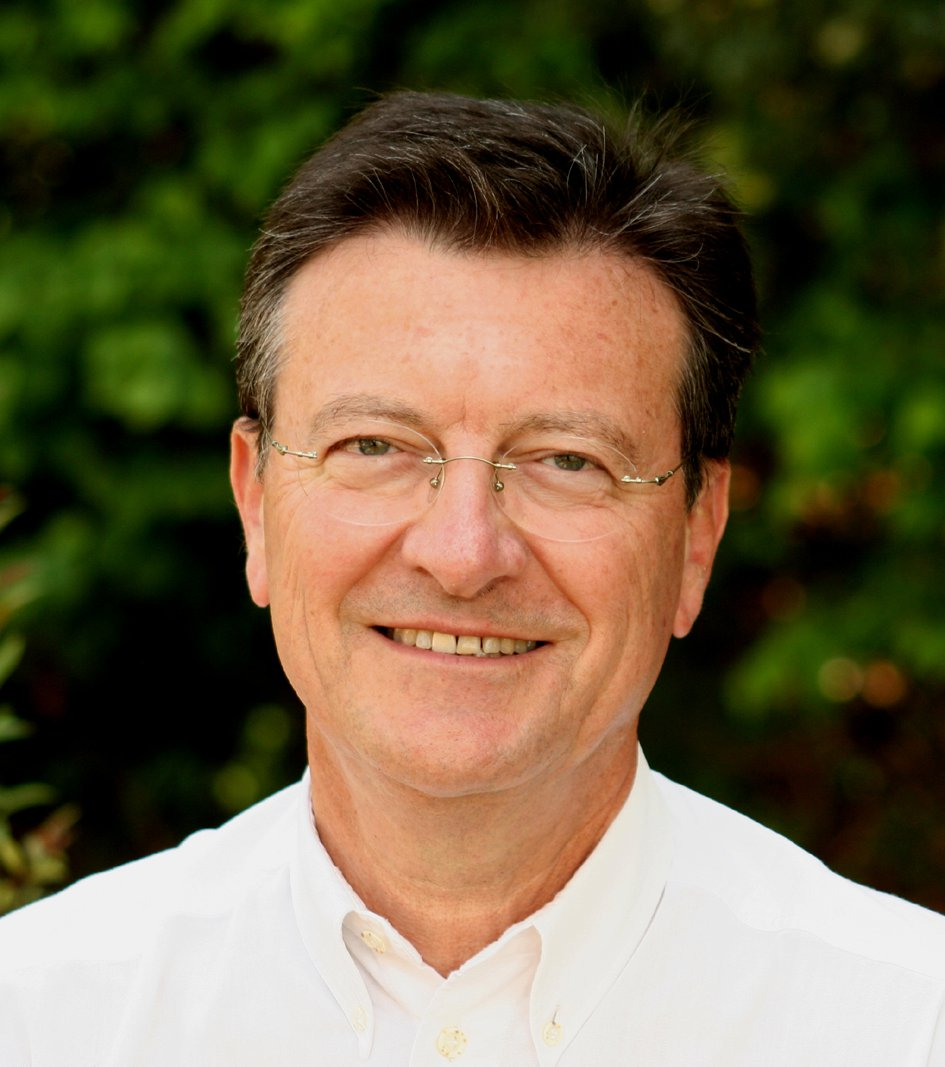
- Diefenbacher in 2007

Member of the National Assembly for Lot-et-Garonne's 2nd constituency
- In office 19 June 2002 – 19 June 2012
- Preceded by: Gérard Gouzes
- Succeeded by: Matthias Fekl
- Parliamentary group: UMP

Regional Councillor for Aquitaine
- In office 21 March 2010 – 13 December 2015

Personal details
- Born: 15 July 1947 Sarrebourg, France
- Died: 9 October 2017 (aged 70) Birac-sur-Trec, France
- Party: UMP
- Education: Sciences Po; ENA

Michel Diefenbacher (15 July 1947 – 9 October 2017) was a French politician and member of the National Assembly of France. He represented the Lot-et-Garonne department, and was a member of the Union for a Popular Movement.
