= Patrick Kanner =

French politician

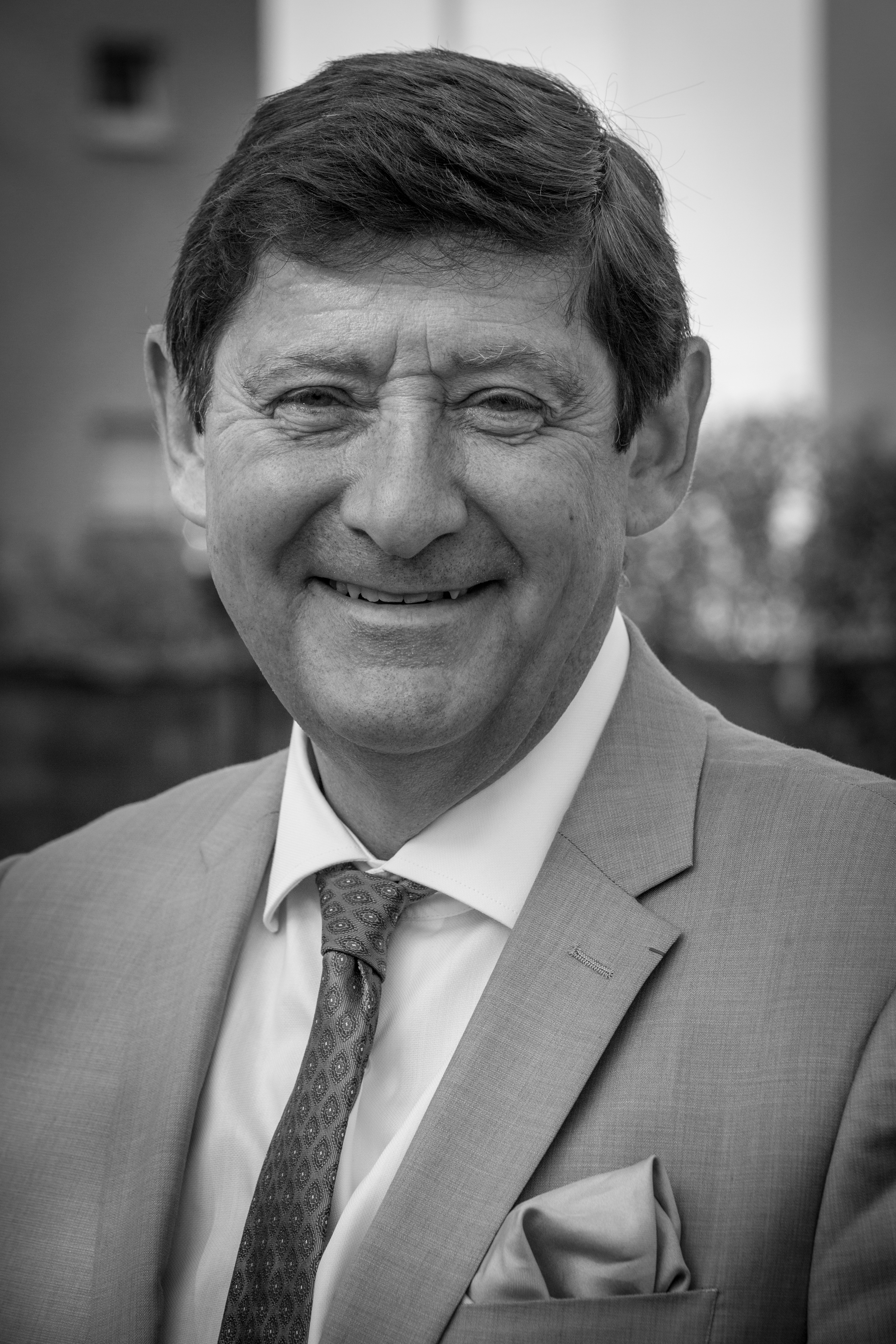
- Kanner in 2014

Senator for Nord
- Incumbent
- Assumed office 1 October 2017

President of the Socialist group in the Senate
- Incumbent
- Assumed office 23 January 2018
- Preceded by: Didier Guillaume

Minister of the City, Youth and Sports
- In office 26 August 2014 – 10 May 2017
- Prime Minister: Manuel Valls; Bernard Cazeneuve
- Preceded by: Najat Vallaud-Belkacem
- Succeeded by: Laura Flessel

President of the General Council of Nord
- In office 31 March 2011 – 22 September 2014
- Preceded by: Bernard Derosier
- Succeeded by: Didier Manier

Personal details
- Born: 29 April 1957 (age 69) Lille, France
- Party: Socialist Party
- Education: Lille 2 University of Health and Law

Patrick Kanner (French pronunciation: [patʁik ka.ne]; born 29 April 1957) is a French politician serving as president of the Socialist group, defeating Éric Kerrouche and Michaël Weber. A member of the Socialist Party, he has represented the department of Nord since 2017. Kanner previously served as President of the General Council of Nord from 2011 to 2014 and Minister of the City, Youth and Sports from 2014 to 2017.

== Early life and education ==
Kanner is the son of Polish Jews who fled Nazism to France. He grew up in Lille and studied at Lille 2 University of Health and Law.

== Political career ==
=== Career in local politics ===
Kanner was elected to the municipal council of Lille in 1989. He became Mayor Pierre Mauroy's youngest adjoint the same year, a position he kept when Martine Aubry assumed the mayorship in 2001. In 1998, he was also elected to the General Council of Nord.

=== Career in government ===
Elected to the presidency of the Nord General Council in 2011, Kanner became Minister of the City, Youth and Sports in the Second Valls government, succeeding Najat Vallaud-Belkacem. He remained in office in the Cazeneuve government.

=== Senator for Nord ===
In 2017, Kanner was elected to the Senate. Following the announced retirement of Didier Guillaume, he was elected president of the Socialist group in the Senate with 47 votes, against Laurence Rossignol with 25 votes, on 23 January 2018.

Ahead of the Socialist Party's 2017 primaries, Kanner endorsed Manuel Valls as the party's candidate for the presidential election later that year.

In the Socialist Party's 2018 convention in Aubervilliers, Kanner publicly endorsed Stéphane Le Foll as candidate for the party's leadership.
