= Thomas Thévenoud =

French politician

Member of the National Assembly for Saône-et-Loire's 1st constituency
- In office 17 June 2012 – 17 June 2017
- Preceded by: Gérard Voisin
- Succeeded by: Benjamin Dirx

Secretary of State for External trade
- In office 26 August 2014 – 4 September 2014
- President: François Hollande
- Prime Minister: Manuel Valls
- Preceded by: Fleur Pellerin
- Succeeded by: Matthias Fekl

Personal details
- Born: 5 May 1974 (age 52) Dijon, France
- Party: Socialist Party
- Education: Sciences Po

Thomas Thévenoud (born 5 May 1974) is a French politician. He is a member of the National Assembly of France, a former trade minister, and a former member of the French Socialist Party. He represents the first legislative district of the Saône-et-Loire department since 2012, and has been vice-president of the general council of the department since 2008.
