= Jean-Pierre Worms =

French sociologist and parliamentarian (1934–2019)

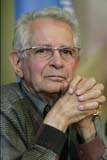

Member of the National Assembly for Saône-et-Loire's 1st constituency
- In office 1981–1993

Personal details
- Born: 16 July 1934 Courbevoie, France
- Died: 12 July 2019 (aged 84) Paris, France
- Party: Socialist Party

Jean-Pierre Worms (16 July 1934 – 12 July 2019) was a French sociologist and former parliamentarian who was active in the associative sector.

He combined the profession of sociologist with political activity which was initially militant but is now mainly associative.

He was elected to the city council of Mâcon (Saône-et-Loire, Burgundy, France) in 1977 and became assistant mayor in charge of economic affairs. He was a member of the Conseil général of Saône-et-Loire for the canton of Mâcon-South from 1989 - 1995. He was active in promoting local economic development and the income guarantee called the revenu minimum d'insertion (RMI).

As a representative of the French parliament to the parliamentary assembly of the Council of Europe, he bore responsibility for the additional protocol to the European Convention of Human Rights defining and protecting the rights of national minorities. He is quoted as saying "Along with decentralisation, it is the thing of which I am proudest during my twelve years in parliament".

He died on 12 July 2019, at age 84.
