= Saône-et-Loire's 1st constituency =

Constituency of the French Fifth Republic

1st constituency of Saône-et-Loire
- inline Constituency of the National Assembly of France

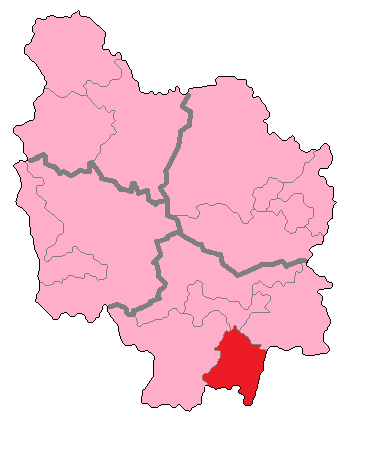
- Saône-et-Loire's 1st Constituency shown within Burgundy
- Deputy: Benjamin Dirx; RE
- Department: Saône-et-Loire
- Cantons: La Chapelle-de-Guinchay, Cluny, Lugny, Mâcon-Centre, Mâcon-Nord, Mâcon-Sud, Matour, Tramayes.
- Registered voters: 72,448

The 1st constituency of the Saône-et-Loire is a French legislative constituency in the Saône-et-Loire département.

== Description ==
The 1st constituency of the Saône-et-Loire is based around the town of Mâcon in the south of Saône-et-Loire.

At the 2012 election Thomas Thévenoud of the Socialist Party defeated the long term incumbent conservative Gérard Voisin who had held the seat since 1993. Since 2017, the seat has been held by Benjamin Dirx of the centrist LREM party.

== Historic Representation ==
| Election | Member | Party |
|---|---|---|
| 1986 | Proportional representation – no election by constituency | |
| 1988 | Jean-Pierre Worms | PS |
| 1993 | Gérard Voisin | UDF |
| 1997 | Gérard Voisin | DL |
| 2002 | Gérard Voisin | UMP |
| 2007 | Gérard Voisin | UMP |
| 2012 | Thomas Thévenoud | PS |
| 2017 | Benjamin Dirx | LREM |
| 2022 | Benjamin Dirx | LREM |
| 2024 | Benjamin Dirx | RE |

== Election results ==
=== 2024 ===
| Candidate | Party | Alliance | First round | | | Second round | | |
| Candidate | Party | Alliance | Votes | % | +/– | Votes | % | +/– |
|---|---|---|---|---|---|---|---|---|
| Rachel Drevet | RN | | 17,602 | 34.65 | +15.54 | 19,636 | 39.44 | new |
| Benjamin Dirx | RE | Ensemble | 15,546 | 30.60 | -5.47 | 30,145 | 60.56 | +3.31 |
| Jean-Luc Delpeuch | LE | NFP | 14,017 | 27.59 | +0.02 | withdrew | | |
| Jean-Philippe Belville | LR | UDC | 2,368 | 4.66 | | | | |
| Jean-Armand Roy | DLF | | 836 | 1.65 | -0.42 | | | |
| Christophe Springaux | LO | | 429 | 0.84 | -0.31 | | | |
| Votes | | | 50,798 | 100.00 | | 49,781 | 100.00 | |
| Valid votes | | | 50,798 | 97.36 | -0.49 | 49,781 | 94.98 | +2.92 |
| Blank votes | | | 934 | 1.79 | +0.24 | 2,051 | 3.91 | -1.88 |
| Null votes | | | 444 | 0.85 | +0.25 | 579 | 1.10 | -1.05 |
| Turnout | | | 52,176 | 69.33 | +19.79 | 52,411 | 69.63 | +22.95 |
| Abstentions | | | 23,084 | 30.67 | -19.79 | 22,862 | 30.37 | -22.95 |
| Registered voters | | | 75,260 | | | 75,273 | | |
| Result | | | RE HOLD | | | | | |

=== 2022 ===
Legislative Election 2022: Saône-et-Loire's 1st constituency
| Party | Candidate | Votes | % | ±% |
|---|---|---|---|---|
| LREM (Ensemble) | Benjamin Dirx | 13,041 | 36.07 | -1.80 |
| EELV (NUPÉS) | Patrick Monin | 9,965 | 27.57 | +8.22 |
| RN | Aurélien Dutremble | 6,909 | 19.11 | +9.35 |
| LR (UDC) | Christophe Juvanon | 2,615 | 7.23 | −14.92 |
| REC | Myriam Bize | 1,694 | 4.69 | N/A |
| DLF (RPR) | Armand Roy | 747 | 2.07 | 0.22 |
| Others | N/A | 1,179 | - | − |
| Turnout | | 36,150 | 49.54 | +0.63 |
2nd round result
| LREM (Ensemble) | Benjamin Dirx | 18,349 | 57.25 | -0.04 |
| EELV (NUPÉS) | Patrick Monin | 13,702 | 42.75 | N/A |
| Turnout | | 32,051 | 46.68 | +7.84 |
| LREM hold | | | | |

=== 2017 ===
Legislative Election 2017: Saône-et-Loire's 1st constituency
| Party | Candidate | Votes | % | ±% |
|---|---|---|---|---|
| LREM | Benjamin Dirx | 13,499 | 37.87 | N/A |
| LR | Jean-Patrick Courtois | 7,898 | 22.15 | −0.03 |
| FN | Nicola Caboche | 3,480 | 9.76 | −2.10 |
| LFI | Patricia Baci | 3,418 | 9.59 | N/A |
| PS | Catherine N'Diaye | 2,022 | 5.67 | −30.65 |
| EELV | Claire Mallard | 1,458 | 4.09 | −0.54 |
| DVD | Gérard Voisin | 1,271 | 3.57 | N/A |
| DLF | Armand Roy | 816 | 2.29 | N/A |
| Others | N/A | 1,788 | - | − |
| Turnout | | 35,650 | 48.91 | −9.29 |
2nd round result
| LREM | Benjamin Dirx | 16,219 | 57.29 | N/A |
| LR | Jean-Patrick Courtois | 12,090 | 42.71 | −3.16 |
| Turnout | | 28,309 | 38.84 | −16.05 |
| LREM gain from PS | | | | |

=== 2012 ===
Legislative Election 2012: Saône-et-Loire's 1st constituency
| Party | Candidate | Votes | % | ±% |
|---|---|---|---|---|
| PS | Thomas Thevenoud | 15,316 | 36.32 | +9.30 |
| UMP | Gérard Voisin | 9,354 | 22.18 | −25.45 |
| DVD | Christine Robin | 6,902 | 16.37 | N/A |
| FN | Evlyne Jurain | 5,000 | 11.86 | +7.90 |
| EELV | Nicole Eschmann | 1,951 | 4.63 | +2.05 |
| FG | Jacquy Lievre | 1,910 | 4.53 | +2.23 |
| MoDem | Sophie Micollet | 994 | 2.36 | −8.54 |
| Others | N/A | 737 | - | − |
| Turnout | | 42,164 | 58.20 | −1.40 |
2nd round result
| PS | Thomas Thevenoud | 21,525 | 54.13 | +9.68 |
| UMP | Gérard Voisin | 18,244 | 45.87 | −9.68 |
| Turnout | | 39,769 | 54.89 | −3.80 |
| PS gain from UMP | | | | |

=== 2007 ===
Legislative Election 2007: Saône-et-Loire's 1st constituency
| Party | Candidate | Votes | % | ±% |
|---|---|---|---|---|
| UMP | Gérard Voisin | 18,819 | 47.63 | −3.04 |
| PS | Nicole Eschmann | 10,676 | 27.02 | N/A |
| MoDem | Christophe Juvanon | 4,308 | 10.90 | N/A |
| FN | Christophe Besset | 1,566 | 3.96 | −6.30 |
| LCR | Jean-François Jezequel | 1,066 | 2.70 | +0.51 |
| LV | Jean-Michel Peyraud | 1,020 | 2.58 | −7.10 |
| PCF | Olivier Taviot | 907 | 2.30 | −1.15 |
| Others | N/A | 1,152 | - | − |
| Turnout | | 40,195 | 59.60 | −3.68 |
2nd round result
| UMP | Gérard Voisin | 21,380 | 55.55 | N/A |
| PS | Nicole Eschmann | 17,106 | 44.45 | N/A |
| Turnout | | 39,577 | 58.69 | N/A |
| UMP hold | | | | |

=== 2002 ===
Legislative Election 2002: Saône-et-Loire's 1st constituency
| Party | Candidate | Votes | % | ±% |
|---|---|---|---|---|
| UMP | Gérard Voisin | 19,824 | 50.67 | N/A |
| EXG | Yves Pagnotte | 6,807 | 17.40 | N/A |
| FN | Maurice Martin | 4,014 | 10.26 | −3.44 |
| LV | Laurent Develay | 3,788 | 9.68 | N/A |
| PCF | Chantal Bathias | 1,351 | 3.45 | −3.57 |
| LCR | Jean-François Jezequel | 858 | 2.19 | N/A |
| Others | N/A | 2,479 | - | − |
| Turnout | | 40,033 | 63.28 | −2.72 |
| UMP gain from PR | | | | |

=== 1997 ===
Legislative Election 1997: Saône-et-Loire's 1st constituency
| Party | Candidate | Votes | % | ±% |
|---|---|---|---|---|
| PR (UDF) | Gérard Voisin | 14,529 | 38.99 | |
| PS | Michel Rognard | 9,133 | 24.51 | |
| FN | Maurice Martin | 5,105 | 13.70 | |
| PCF | Chantal Bathias | 2,615 | 7.02 | |
| DVE | Jean-Pierre Bonnin | 2,224 | 5.97 | |
| GE | Nathalie Denne | 1,384 | 3.71 | |
| LO | René Boudier | 918 | 2.46 | |
| DVG | Jérôme Caltran | 742 | 1.99 | |
| DVG | Françoise Mitterrand | 614 | 1.65 | |
| Turnout | | 39,855 | 66.00 | |
2nd round result
| PR (UDF) | Gérard Voisin | 22,588 | 56.44 | |
| PS | Michel Rognard | 17,431 | 43.56 | |
| Turnout | | 42,920 | 71.09 | |
| PR hold | | | | |

== Sources ==
Official results of French elections from 2002: "Résultats électoraux officiels en France" (in French).
