= Véronique Louwagie =

French politician

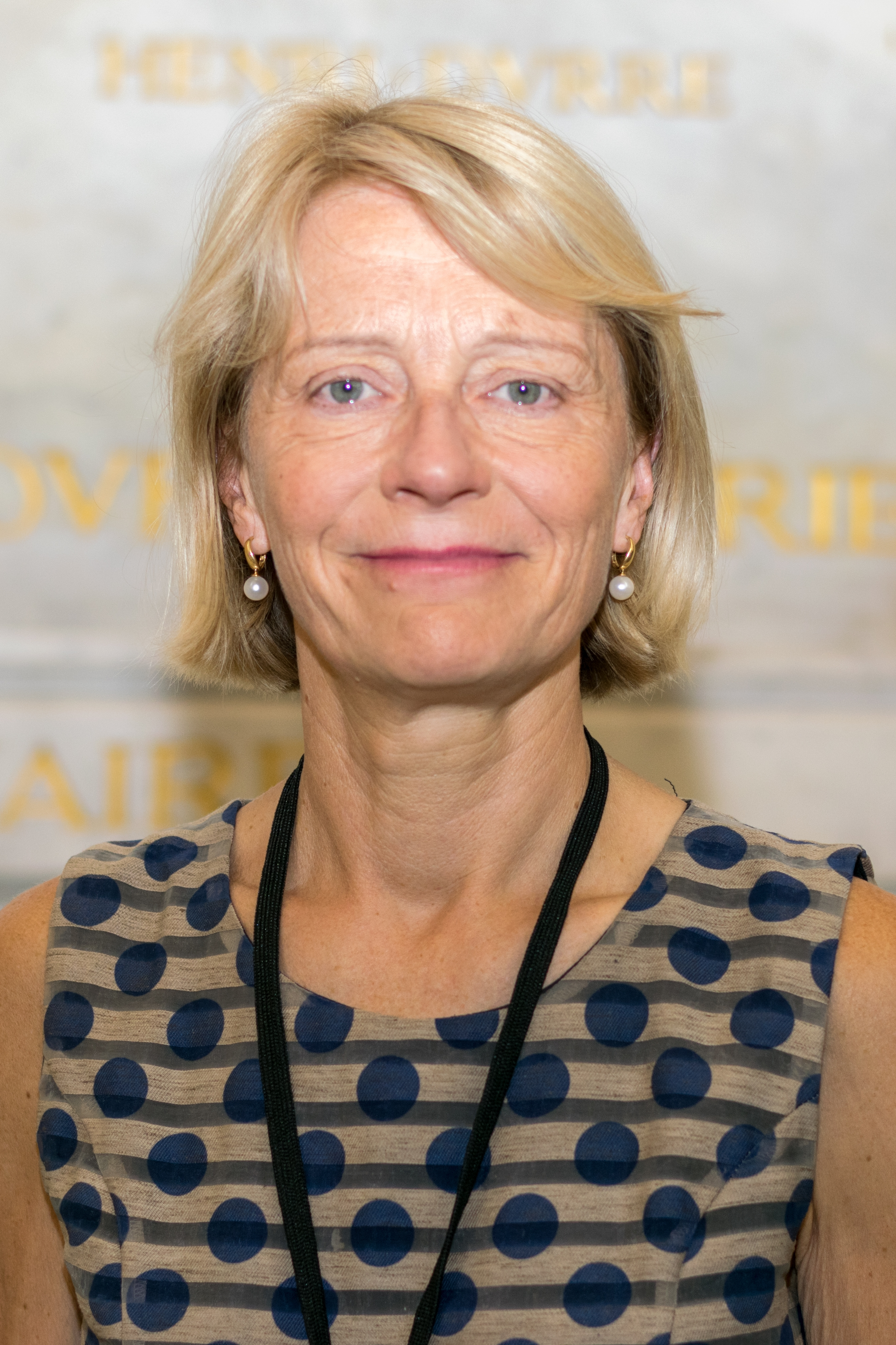

Member of the National Assembly for Orne's 2nd constituency
- Incumbent
- Assumed office 20 June 2012
- Preceded by: Jean-Claude Lenoir

Personal details
- Born: 20 March 1961 (age 65) Buis-sur-Damville, Eure, Normandy, France
- Party: The Republicans

Véronique Louwagie (born 20 March 1961) is a French politician of The Republicans (LR) who has served as Minister Delegate for Trade, Crafts, Small and Medium Enterprises, Social and Solidarity Economy in the government of Prime Minister François Bayrou from 2024 to 2025. She previously represented Orne's 2nd constituency in the National Assembly from 2012 to 2024.

== Political career ==
During her time in parliament, Louwagie served on the Finance Committee. In this capacity, she was the parliament's rapporteur on the health budget. In addition to her committee assignments, she was a member of the French-Turkish Parliamentary Friendship Group.

Following the 2017 elections, Louwagie served as one of the eleven deputy chairpersons of the Republicans' parliamentary group, under the leadership of chairman Christian Jacob.

In the Republicans’ 2016 presidential primaries, Louwagie endorsed François Fillon as the party's candidate for the office of President of France. In the Republicans’ 2017 leadership election, she endorsed Laurent Wauquiez. In 2018, Wauquiez included her in his shadow cabinet.

Following Jacob's election as LR chairman, Louwagie announced her candidacy to succeed him as leader of the party's parliamentary group. In an internal vote in November 2019, she eventually came in fifth out of six candidates; the position went to Damien Abad instead.

In 2023, the Republicans' chairman Éric Ciotti appointed Louwagie as member of his shadow cabinet and put her in charge of the party's positions on the national budget.

== Political positions ==
In July 2019, Louwagie voted against the French ratification of the European Union’s Comprehensive Economic and Trade Agreement (CETA) with Canada.

== Other activities ==
- Caisse d'amortissement de la dette sociale (CADES), Member of the Supervisory Board
