= Éric Coquerel =

French politician (born 1958)

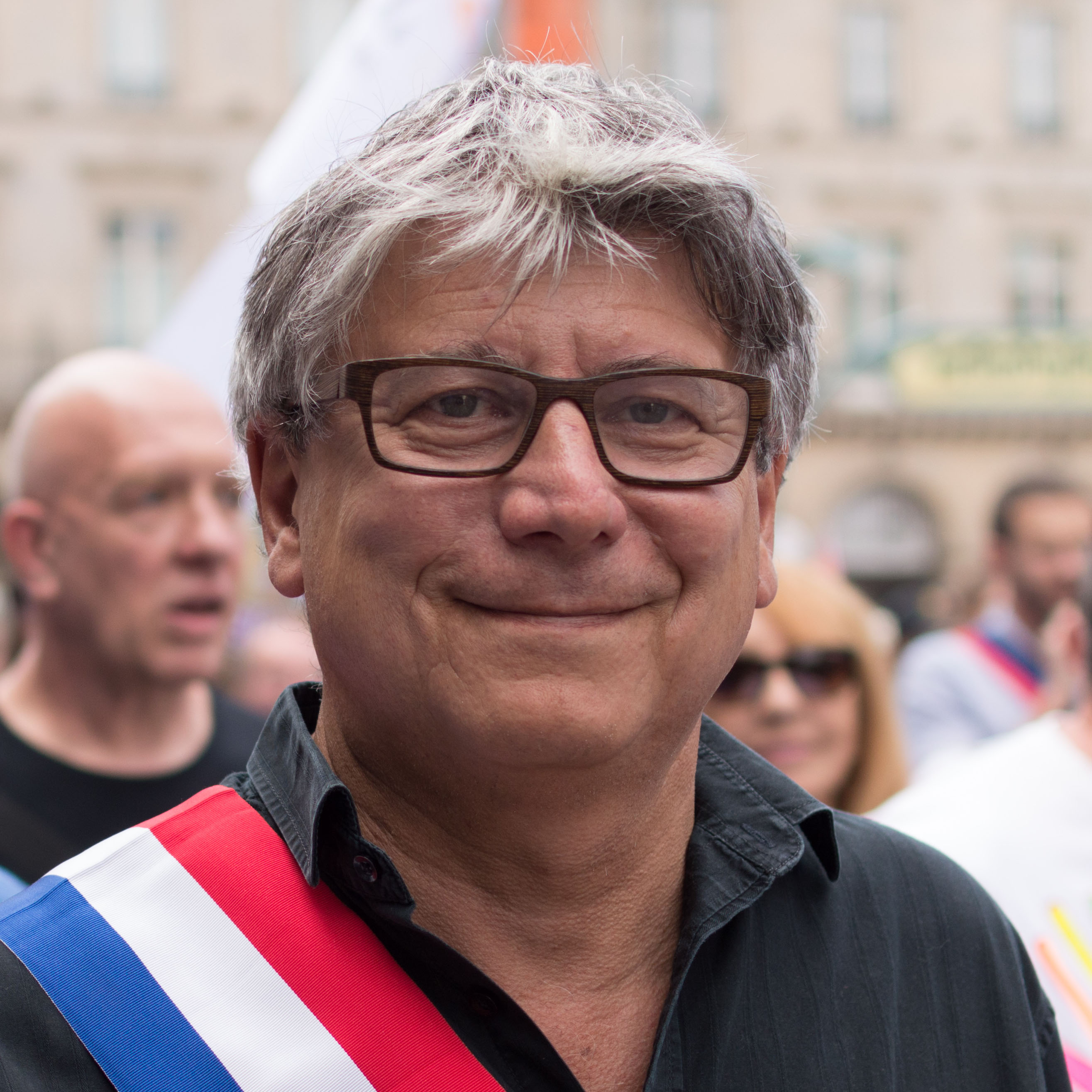
- Éric Coquerel in 2017

Member of the National Assembly for Seine-Saint-Denis' 1st constituency
- Incumbent
- Assumed office 21 June 2017
- Preceded by: Bruno Le Roux

President of the Finance Committee of the National Assembly
- Incumbent
- Assumed office 30 June 2022
- Preceded by: Éric Woerth

Personal details
- Born: 30 December 1958 (age 66); Courbevoie, France
- Political party: La France Insoumise

Éric Coquerel (French pronunciation: [eʁik kɔkʁɛl]; born 30 December 1958) is a French politician representing La France Insoumise (LFI). He was elected to the French National Assembly on 18 June 2017, representing the department of Seine-Saint-Denis. In 2022, following the parliamentary elections, he was elected chair of the Finance Committee.

== Accusations of inappropriate behaviour with women ==
Rumors have long circulated about his behaviour with women. He was formally accused on 2 July 2022 of "inappropriate gestures" by Sophie Tissier, a former figure of the yellow vests protests. The latter declared having seized the committee against sexual violence of La France Insoumise.

== See also ==
- 2017 French legislative election
