= Lot-et-Garonne's 2nd constituency =

Constituency of the National Assembly of France

2nd constituency of Lot-et-Garonne
- inline Constituency of the National Assembly of France

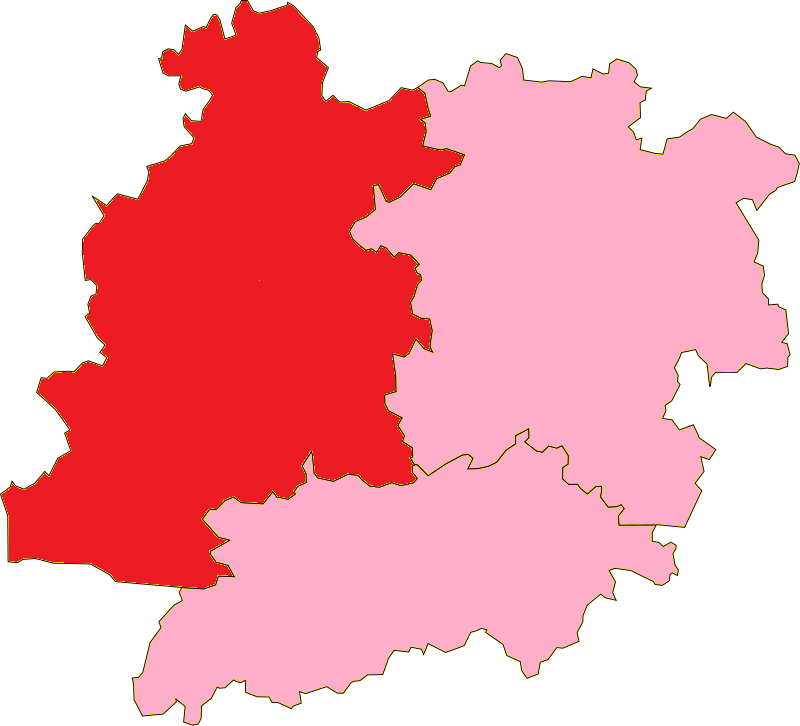
- Lot-et-Garonne's 2nd Constituency shown within Lot-et-Garonne
- Deputy: Hélène Laporte; RN
- Department: Lot-et-Garonne
- Cantons: Bouglon, Casteljaloux, Castelmoron-sur-Lot, Damazan, Duras, Houeillès, Lauzun, Marmande Est, Marmande Ouest, Le Mas-d'Agenais, Meilhan-sur-Garonne, Port-Sainte-Marie, Seyches, Tonneins
- Registered voters: 76963

The 2nd constituency of Lot-et-Garonne (French: Deuxième circonscription de Lot-et-Garonne) is a French legislative constituency in the Lot-et-Garonne département. Like the other 576 French constituencies, it elects one MP using a two round electoral system.

== Description ==
The 2nd Constituency of Lot-et-Garonne covers the north west portion of the Department. Politically since 1988 the seat has swung between the mainstream left and right broadly in line with the national trend. In common with the other two seats in the department it voted for the En Marche candidate at the 2017 election. That election featured a strong performance by the National Front whereby their candidate secured 2nd place in the 1st round of voting and over 40% in the run off.

== Assembly members ==
Election	Member	Party
1988	Gérard Gouzes	PS
1993	Georges Richard	RPR
1997	Gérard Gouzes	PS
2002	Michel Diefenbacher	UMP
2007	Michel Diefenbacher	UMP
2012	Matthias Fekl	PS
2014	Régine Povéda	PS
2017	Alexandre Freschi	LREM
2022	Hélène Laporte	RN
2024	Hélène Laporte	RN

== Election results ==
=== 2024 ===
Candidate	Party	Alliance	First round		Second round	
Candidate	Party	Alliance	Votes	%	Votes	%
Hélène Laporte	RN		25,283	49.31	28,203	57.20
Christophe Courregelongue	PS	NPF	13,787	26.89	21,103	42.80
Jean-Marie Lenzi	REN	Ensemble	11,272	21.99		
Nathalie Lambolez	LO		929	1.81		
Valid votes			51,271	96.12	49,306	91.69
Blank votes			1,195	2.24	3,060	5.69
Null votes			877	1.64	1,409	2.62
Turnout			53,343	69.33	53,775	69.87
Abstentions			23,601	30.67	23,188	30.13
Registered voters			76,944		79,963	
Result			RN HOLD			

=== 2022 ===
Legislative Election 2022: Lot-et-Garonne's 2nd constituency
Party	Candidate	Votes	%	±%
RN	Hélène Laporte	12,233	30.55	+10.22
PS (NUPÉS)	Christophe Courregelongue	10,423	26.03	-5.83
LREM (Ensemble)	Alexandre Freschi	10,259	25.62	-2.77
LR (UDC)	Martine Calzavara	2,339	5.84	−7.98
REC	Isabelle Hénaff	2,018	5.04	N/A
LMR	Patrick Maurin	1,604	4.01	N/A
PA	Michel Vendège	646	1.61	N/A
LO	Laetitia Redoulez	516	1.29	N/A
Turnout		40,038	53.15	−0.84
2nd round result
RN	Hélène Laporte	16,516	39.44	−0.84
PS (NUPÉS)	Christophe Courregelongue	12,880	30.75	N/A
LREM (Ensemble)	Alexandre Freschi	12,484	29.81	−29.91
Turnout		41,880	55.56	+12.30
RN gain from LREM				

=== 2017 ===
Legislative Election 2017: Lot-et-Garonne's 2nd constituency
Party	Candidate	Votes	%	±%
LREM	Alexandre Freschi	11,473	28.39	N/A
FN	Hélène Laporte	8,214	20.33	+2.40
PS	Matthias Fekl	6,869	17.00	−18.09
LR	Emilien Roso	5,584	13.82	−17.51
LFI	Sylvio Guingan	3,917	9.69	N/A
PCF	Michel Ceruti	1,086	2.69	−8.84
EELV	Mathilde Boeuf	1,003	2.48	−0.06
Others	N/A	2,266		
Turnout		40,412	52.50	−9.06
2nd round result
LREM	Alexandre Freschi	19,883	59.72	N/A
FN	Hélène Laporte	13,413	40.28	N/A
Turnout		33,296	43.26	−16.84
LREM gain from PS				

=== 2012 ===
Legislative Election 2012: Lot-et-Garonne's 2nd constituency
Party	Candidate	Votes	%	±%
PS	Matthias Fekl	16,781	35.09	
UMP	Michel Diefenbacher	14,982	31.33	
FN	Etienne Bousquet-Cassagne	8,572	17.93	
FG	Raymond Girardi	5,513	11.53	
EELV	Pierre Salane	1,214	2.54	
Others	N/A	757		
Turnout		47,819	61.56	
2nd round result
PS	Matthias Fekl	25,049	53.65	
UMP	Michel Diefenbacher	21,641	46.35	
Turnout		46,690	60.10	
PS gain from UMP				
