= Orne's 2nd constituency =

Constituency of the National Assembly of France

2nd constituency of Orne
- inline Constituency of the National Assembly of France

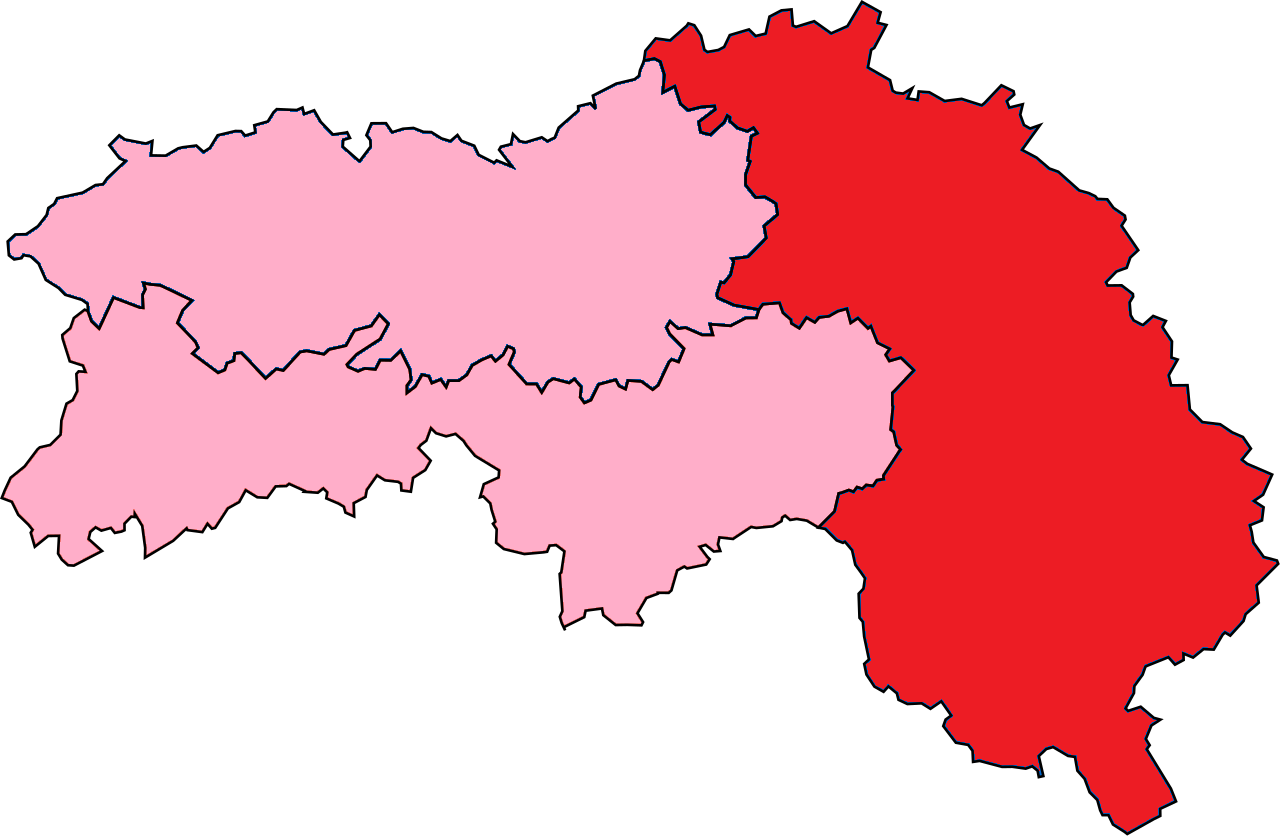
- Orne's 2nd Constituency shown within Orne

- Orne in France
- Deputy: Véronique Louwagie; LR
- Department: Orne
- Cantons: Cantons de : L'Aigle Est, L'Aigle Ouest, Bazoches-sur-Hoëne, Bellême, La Ferté-Frênel, Gacé, Longny-au-Perche, Le Merlerault, Mortagne-au-Perche, Moulins-la-Marche, Nocé, Pervenchères, Rémalard, Le Theil, Tourouvre, Vimoutiers
- Registered voters: 67447

The 2nd constituency of the Orne (French: Deuxième circonscription de l'Orne) is a French legislative constituency in the Orne département. Like the other 576 French constituencies, it elects one MP using a two round electoral system.

== Description ==
The 2nd Constituency of the Orne covers the eastern portion of the department including the town of L'Aigle.

Since 1988 the seat has always returned conservative or centre right deputies to the National Assembly including the first woman to represent the seat Véronique Louwagie.

== Assembly Members ==
Election	Member	Party
1988	Francis Geng	UDF
1993	Jean-Claude Lenoir	UDF
1997	Jean-Claude Lenoir	UDF
2002	Jean-Claude Lenoir	UMP
2007	Jean-Claude Lenoir	UMP
2012	Véronique Louwagie	UMP
2017	Véronique Louwagie	LR
2022	Véronique Louwagie	LR

== Election results ==
=== 2024 ===
Legislative Election 2024: Orne's 2nd constituency
Party	Candidate	Votes	%	±%
DVG (NFP)	Guillaume Sacriste	7,336	16.77	n/a
HOR (Ensemble)	Amale El Khaledi	3,060	7.00	−6.87
DVD	Véronique Louwagie	14,411	32.95	+0.23
LO	Bernadette Velly	470	1.07	n/a
DLF	Séverine Prehu	456	1.04	n/a
RN	Gérard Vienne	17,502	40.01	+15.48
REC	Raymond Herbreteau	455	1.04	−2.87
DIV	Patrick Levacher	49	0.11	n/a
Turnout		43,739	97.80	+47.11
Registered electors		64,536		
2nd round result
DVD	Véronique Louwagie	23,433	54.43	+21.48
RN	Gérard Vienne	19,621	45.57	+5.56
Turnout		43,054	96.27	−1.53
Registered electors		64,536		
DVD hold		Swing		

=== 2022 ===
Legislative Election 2022: Orne's 2nd constituency
Party	Candidate	Votes	%	±%
LR (UDC)	Véronique Louwagie	10,759	32.72	+1.81
RN	Alexandre Morel	8,067	24.53	+8.09
EELV (NUPÉS)	Cécile Bussiere	5,318	16.17	−0.72
HOR (Ensemble)	Amale El Khaledi	4,562	13.87	−17.12
REC	Amaury De Bourbon Parme	1,287	3.91	N/A
LMR	Denis Mousset	944	2.87	N/A
FGR	Christophe Joseph	719	2.19	N/A
Others	N/A	1,225	3.73	
Turnout		32,881	50.69	−0.62
2nd round result
LR (UDC)	Véronique Louwagie	18,118	60.80	+6.07
RN	Alexandre Morel	11,679	39.20	N/A
Turnout		29,797	48.59	+4.75
LR hold				

=== 2017 ===
Legislative Election 2017: Orne's 2nd constituency
Party	Candidate	Votes	%	±%
LREM	Ophélie Lerouge	10,727	30.99	
LR	Véronique Louwagie	10,699	30.91	
FN	Francine Lavanry	5,690	16.44	
LFI	Jean-Claude Marie	2,987	8.63	
PS	Serge Delavallée	1,854	5.36	
EELV	Pierre Ristic	1,005	2.90	
DLF	Philippe Camus	694	2.00	
Others	N/A	959		
Turnout		34,615	51.31	
2nd round result
LR	Véronique Louwagie	16,182	54.73	
LREM	Ophélie Lerouge	13,386	45.27	
Turnout		29,568	43.84	
LR hold				

=== 2012 ===
2012 legislative election in Orne's 2nd constituency
Candidate	Party	First round		Second round	
Candidate	Party	Votes	%	Votes	%
Véronique Louwagie	UMP	13,068	32.84%	23,162	60.00%
Souad El Manaa	PS	11,106	27.91%	15,441	40.00%
Patrick Fourny	FN	6,032	15.16%		
Jean-François De Caffarelli	UMP dissident	3,315	8.33%		
Jean Sellier	UDF dissident?	2,859	7.18%		
Jean-Claude Marie	FG	1,423	3.58%		
Claude Gazengel		774	1.95%		
Bernard Allain	UDN	368	0.92%		
Chantal Flores	LO	332	0.83%		
Dominique Hatton	DLR	330	0.83%		
Georges Hubelhardt	NPA	186	0.47%		
Valid votes		39,793	97.92%	38,603	95.77%
Spoilt and null votes		847	2.08%	1,605	3.98%
Votes cast / turnout		40,640	59.05%	40,308	58.56%
Abstentions		28,183	40.95%	28,529	41.44%
Registered voters		68,823	100.00%	68,837	100.00%
