= Benjamin Dirx =

French politician

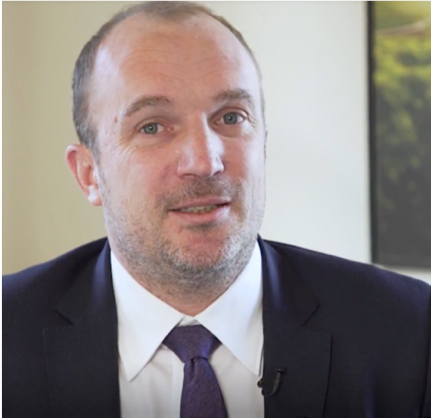

Member of the National Assembly for Saône-et-Loire's 1st constituency
- Incumbent
- Assumed office 2017
- Preceded by: Thomas Thévenoud

Personal details
- Born: 25 January 1979 (age 47) Villefranche-sur-Saône, France
- Party: La République En Marche!
- Education: University of Burgundy

Benjamin Dirx (born 25 January 1979) is a French entrepreneur and politician of La République En Marche! (LREM) who has been serving as a member of the French National Assembly since the 2017 elections, representing the department of Saône-et-Loire.

== Political career ==
In parliament, Dirx has been a member of the Finance Committee since 2018. He has also been a member of the Committee on Foreign Affairs (2017–2018) and the Committee on European Affairs (2017–2020). On the Finance Committee, Dirx is the parliament's rapporteur on the national budget for higher education and on shareholder activism.

Since 2020, Dirx has been part of his parliamentary group's leadership under chair Christophe Castaner.

== Political positions ==
Together with Éric Woerth, Dirx published a non-legally binding report in 2019 which garnered international attention for its recommendations on preventing short-sellers and activists from unfairly destabilising French corporates. These included widening the disclosures of short positions to derivatives instruments, pushing for more transparency around the borrowing and lending of stock, and investigating whether market functions are jeopardised once short selling reaches a certain volume of shares.

In July 2019, Dirx decided to abstain from a vote on the French ratification of the European Union’s Comprehensive Economic and Trade Agreement (CETA) with Canada.

== See also ==
- 2017 French legislative election
