= Bruno Le Roux =

French politician (born 1965)

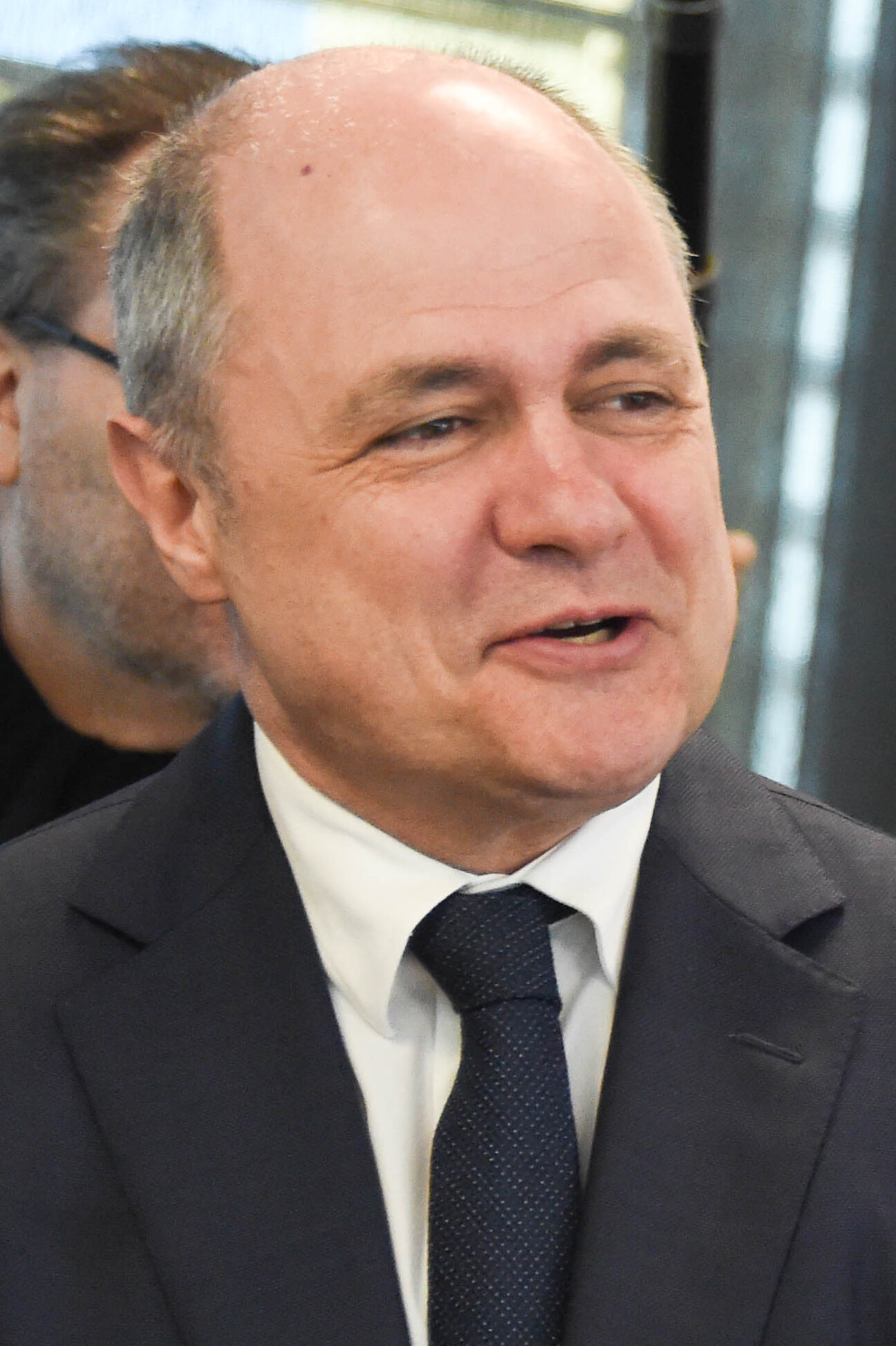
- Bruno Le Roux in 2017

Minister of the Interior
- In office 6 December 2016 – 21 March 2017
- Prime Minister: Bernard Cazeneuve
- Preceded by: Bernard Cazeneuve
- Succeeded by: Matthias Fekl

Leader of the Socialist Group in the National Assembly
- In office 21 June 2012 – 6 December 2016
- Preceded by: Jean-Marc Ayrault
- Succeeded by: Seybah Dagoma (Acting); Olivier Faure

Member of the National Assembly for Seine-Saint-Denis's 1st constituency
- In office 12 June 1997 – 20 June 2017
- Preceded by: Raoul Béteille
- Succeeded by: Éric Coquerel

Mayor of Épinay-sur-Seine
- In office 25 June 1995 – 18 March 2001
- Preceded by: Gilbert Bonnemaison
- Succeeded by: Hervé Chevreau

Personal details
- Born: 2 May 1965 (age 61) Gennevilliers, France
- Party: Socialist Party
- Education: Paris Nanterre University

Bruno Le Roux (French pronunciation: [bʁyno lə ʁu]; born 2 May 1965) is a French politician of the Socialist Party who served as the Minister of the Interior of France from December 2016 to March 2017.

== Political career ==
Le Roux was a member of the National Assembly of France where he represented the Seine-Saint-Denis department and was the leader of the Socialist, Ecologist & Republican Group. He led the Socialist Party in the National Assembly from 2012 until 2016.

In the Socialist Party's 2011 primaries, Le Roux endorsed François Hollande as the party's candidate for the 2012 presidential election.

On 6 December 2016, Le Roux was named Minister of the Interior in the government of Bernard Cazeneuve.

In 2015, news media reported that Le Roux was included in a Russian blacklist of prominent people from the European Union who are not allowed to enter the country.

Ahead of the Socialist Party's 2017 primaries, Le Roux endorsed Manuel Valls as the party's candidate for the presidential election later that year.

=== Resignation ===
On 21 March 2017, Le Roux was forced to resign from the government when it was revealed that he employed his two daughters, aged just 15 and 16, as parliamentary assistants and paid them a total of €55,000 ($59,000), using public funds, while he served as a deputy in the National Assembly. He was succeeded by Matthias Fekl, the Minister of State for Foreign Trade.

Party political offices
Preceded by Jean-Marc Ayrault	Leader of the Socialist Group in the National Assembly; 2012–2016	Succeeded by Seybah Dagoma; Acting
Political offices
Preceded by Bernard Cazeneuve	Minister of the Interior; 2016–2017	Succeeded by Matthias Fekl
