= Alexandre Freschi =

French politician

Member of the National Assembly for Lot-et-Garonne's 2nd constituency
- In office 21 June 2017 – 21 June 2022
- Preceded by: Matthias Fekl

Personal details
- Born: 17 May 1979 (age 47) Marmande, France
- Party: La République En Marche!
- Spouse: Marianne Milan
- Children: 2
- Education: Pantheon-Sorbonne University

Alexandre Freschi (born 17 May 1979) is a French politician of La République En Marche! (LREM) has been serving as a member of the French National Assembly from 2017 until 2022, representing the department of Lot-et-Garonne.

== Political career ==
In parliament, Freschi serves as member of the Committee on Cultural Affairs and Education and the Committee on European Affairs. In addition to his committee assignments, he is part of the parliamentary friendship groups with Italy and Portugal. In July 2019, Freschi voted in favor of the French ratification of the European Union’s Comprehensive Economic and Trade Agreement (CETA) with Canada.

== See also ==
- 2017 French legislative election
