= Matthias Fekl =

French politician (born 1977)

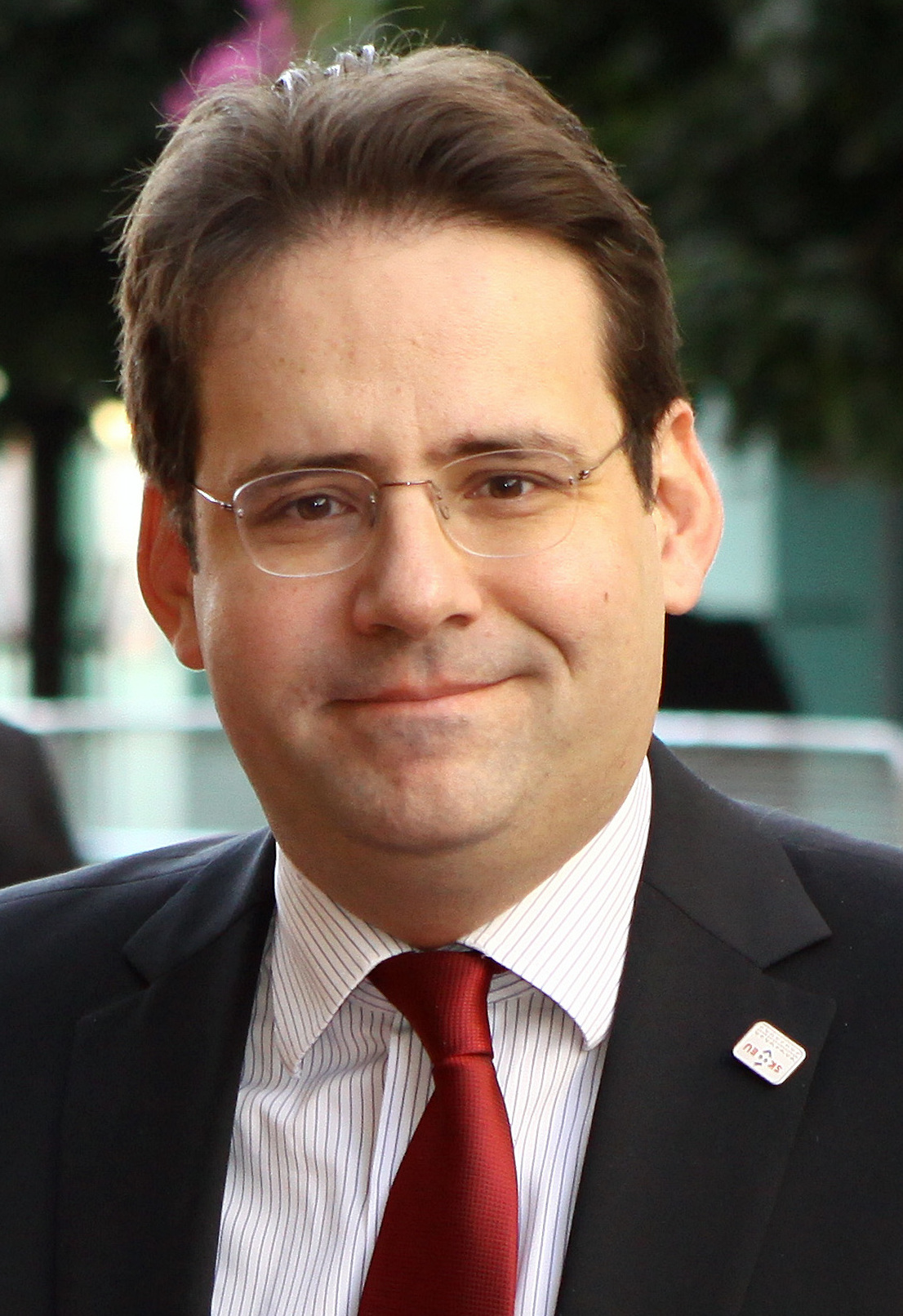

Minister of the Interior
- In office 21 March 2017 – 10 May 2017
- Prime Minister: Bernard Cazeneuve
- Preceded by: Bruno Le Roux
- Succeeded by: Gérard Collomb

Secretary of State for Foreign Trade, Tourism and French citizens abroad
- In office 4 September 2014 – 21 March 2017
- Prime Minister: Manuel Valls; Bernard Cazeneuve
- Preceded by: Thomas Thévenoud
- Succeeded by: Position abolished

Member of the National Assembly for Lot-et-Garonne's 2nd constituency
- In office 17 June 2017 – 20 June 2017
- Preceded by: Régine Povéda
- Succeeded by: Alexandre Freschi
- In office 20 June 2012 – 4 October 2014
- Preceded by: Michel Diefenbacher
- Succeeded by: Régine Povéda

Personal details
- Born: 4 October 1977 (age 48) Frankfurt, West Germany
- Party: Socialist Party
- Education: Lycée Henri-IV
- Alma mater: École normale supérieure de Lyon; Sciences Po; École nationale d'administration

Matthias Fekl (French pronunciation: [matja(s) fɛkl]; born 4 October 1977) is a French politician of the Socialist Party who served as Minister of the Interior in the government of Prime Minister Bernard Cazeneuve in 2017.

Fekl was first elected to the National Assembly in the second constituency of Lot-et-Garonne in 2012, retaining his seat until 2014, when he became Secretary of State for Foreign Trade, Tourism and French citizens abroad. In 2017, he briefly returned to Parliament for the remainder of his term. Since 2019, he has been serving as president of the Association of French Breweries.

== Early life and education ==
Fekl was born on 4 October 1977 in Frankfurt, West Germany. His father is a German university professor and his mother is a French teacher. He grew up in West Berlin before moving to Paris, where he graduated from the Lycée Henri-IV. He later studied at various universities (Sciences Po, École normale supérieure de Lyon, École nationale d'administration).

== Political career ==
=== Early political career ===
From 2010 to 2011, Fekl served as chief of staff to Jean-Pierre Bel, then president of the Socialist group in the Senate. When Bel became President of the Senate, Fekl served as his special adviser. Fekl was elected member of the National Assembly in the 2012 legislative election. During his time in Parliament, he was a member of the Committee on Legal Affairs. In 2012, Interior Minister Manuel Valls mandated Fekl with a report on immigration which was later submitted to Prime Minister Jean-Marc Ayrault.

On 11 February 2014, Fekl was among the guests invited to the state dinner hosted by U.S. President Barack Obama in honor of President François Hollande at the White House.

=== Secretary of State for Foreign Trade ===
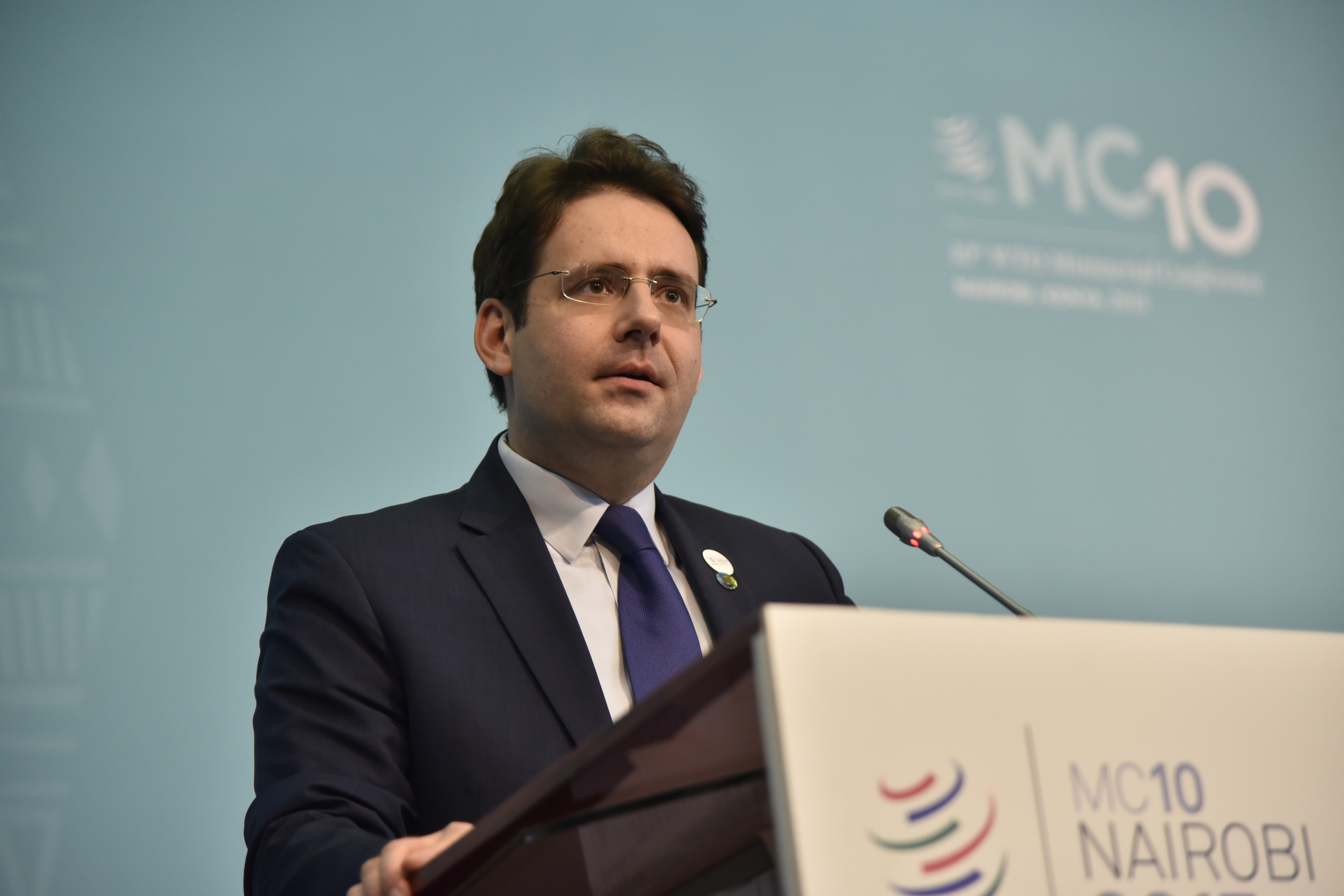
Fekl at the 2015 WTO Ministerial Conference in Nairobi

In 2014, Fekl was appointed to be Secretary of State for Foreign Trade at the Ministry of Foreign Affairs and International Development under the leadership of minister successive ministers Laurent Fabius and Jean-Marc Ayrault, succeeding Thomas Thévenoud. During his time in office, France opened a trade office in Tehran in September 2015, leading the charge of European countries angling for a share of the Iranian market after the Joint Comprehensive Plan of Action.

In October 2016, Fekl launched his own political movement, the Movement for the Life of Ideas and Alternatives (Mouvement pour la vie des idées et des alternatives, Movida). He also briefly belonged to the campaign team of Benoît Hamon for the 2017 presidential election.

=== Minister of the Interior ===
Fekl was appointed as Minister of the Interior on 21 March 2017, succeeding Bruno Le Roux, who was forced to resign after it was revealed that he had employed his two daughters, at the age of 15, as parliamentary assistants. In response to the March 2017 social unrest in French Guiana, Fekl and fellow cabinet member Ericka Bareigts were dispatched to the overseas French department by Prime Minister Cazeneuve. He ran for reelection to the National Assembly in the 2017 legislative election but was defeated by Alexandre Freschi, who stood for La République En Marche! (REM).

Ahead of the Socialist Party's 2018 convention in Aubervilliers, Fekl publicly endorsed Olivier Faure as candidate for the party's leadership.

== Other activities ==
- Terra Nova, Member of the Board of Directors

Political offices
Preceded by Bruno Le Roux	Minister of the Interior; 2017	Succeeded by Gérard Collomb
