= Bernard Vera =

French politician (born 1950)

Bernard Vera (born 5 March 1950 in Villefranche-de-Rouergue) is a former member of the Senate of France, representing the Essonne department from 2004 to 2011 and from 2016 to 2017. He is a member of the Communist, Republican, and Citizen Group.
