= Seine-Saint-Denis's 1st constituency =

Constituency of the National Assembly of France

1st constituency of Seine-Saint-Denis
- inline Constituency of the National Assembly of France

- The constituency in Seine-Saint-Denis
- Deputy: Éric Coquerel; LFI
- Department: Seine-Saint-Denis
- Registered voters: 61,804

The 1st constituency of Seine-Saint-Denis (French: Première circonscription de la Seine-Saint-Denis) is one of the 12 legislative constituencies in Seine-Saint-Denis département of France (93). Like the other 576 French constituencies, it elects one MP using the two-round system.

== Deputies ==
Election	Member	Party	Source
1988	Gilbert Bonnemaison	PS	
1993	Raoul Béteille	UDF	
1997	Bruno Le Roux	PS	
2002	Bruno Le Roux	PS	
2007	Bruno Le Roux	PS	
2012	Bruno Le Roux	PS	
2017	Éric Coquerel	LFI	
2022	Éric Coquerel	LFI	

== Election results ==
=== 2024 ===
Candidate	Party	Alliance	First round			Second round		
Candidate	Party	Alliance	Votes	%	+/–	Votes	%	+/–
Éric Coquerel	LFI	NFP	27,298	65.28	+9.12			
Jean-Pierre Monfils	RE	ENS	6,185	14.79	-4.10			
Julien Grazioli	RN		4,803	11.49	+4.26			
François Peguillet	LR		1,208	2.89	+0.37			
Gersende Le Maire	DVE		878	2.10	N/A			
Nabil Bouard	DIV		618	1.48	N/A			
Alain Aubry	LO		543	1.30	+0.21			
Paul Uhalde	DVG		204	0.49	N/A			
Emmanuel Bilongo Mambweni	DIV		62	0.15	N/A			
Gaëll Falisz	DIV		18	0.04	N/A			
Valid votes			41,817	98.18				
Blank votes			484	1.14	-0.11			
Null votes			290	0.68	-0.02			
Turnout			42,591	60.92	+22.54			
Abstentions			27,325	39.08	-22.54			
Registered voters			69,916					
Source: Ministry of the Interior, Le Monde
Result						LFI HOLD		

=== 2022 ===
Candidate	Party	Alliance	First round			Second round		
Candidate	Party	Alliance	Votes	%	+/–	Votes	%	+/–
Éric Coquerel	LFI	NUPÉS	13,608	53.79	+12.94	17,456	71.68	+19.95
Jeanne Dromard	LREM	Ensemble	4,780	18.89	-13.00	6,895	28.32	-19.95
Marie Brand	RN		1,829	7.23	+1.30			
Madioula Aidara Diaby	DVG		970	3.83	N/A			
Marianne Darmon	DVG		728	2.88	N/A			
Anne-Solenne Busch	REC		636	2.51	N/A			
François Peguillet	LR	UDC	616	2.43	-10.24			
Fouzia Zekri		FGR	600	2.37	N/A			
Mohamed-Jamil Abid	DVG		530	2.10	N/A			
Jérôme Hirigoyen	PA		368	1.45	N/A			
Alain Aubry	LO		276	1.09	N/A			
Francois Deroche	DVC		236	0.93	N/A			
Maïa Bahloul	POID		98	0.39	N/A			
Etienna Etienne	UDI	UDC	23	0.09	N/A			
Olga Ede	DVC		0	0.00	N/A			
Valid votes			25,298	98.05	+0.16	24,351	95.72	+2.60
Blank votes			323	1.25	-0.14	750	2.95	-1.39
Null votes			181	0.70	-0.02	339	1.33	-1.21
Turnout			25,802	38.38	+1.39	25,440	37.82	+5.60
Abstentions			25,802	61.62	-1.39	41,824	62.18	-5.60
Registered voters			67,235			67,264		
Source: Ministry of the Interior, Le Monde
Result						LFI HOLD		

=== 2017 ===
Candidate	Party	Alliance	First round			Second round		
Candidate	Party	Alliance	Votes	%	+/–	Votes	%	+/–
Sébastien Ménard	REM		7,136	31.89	N/A	8,951	48.27	N/A
Éric Coquerel	LFI		4,256	19.02	N/A	9,591	51.73	N/A
Marina Venturini	LR	UDC	2,834	12.67	N/A			
Yannick Trigance	PS		2,113	9.44	-38.02			
Frédéric Durand	PCF		1,693	7.57	-6.65			
Gérard Levental	FN		1,327	5.93	-4.76			
Dina Deffairi-Saissac	EELV		854	3.82	-0.90			
Bocar Niane	DIV		472	2.11	N/A			
Samir Laidi	DIV		242	1.08	N/A			
Anne-Laure Chaudon	EXG		202	0.90	N/A			
Kamel Bessaha	DIV		201	0.90	N/A			
Lorenzo de la Rochefoucauld	DIV		166	0.74	N/A			
Nadia Bouarissa	DIV		146	0.65	N/A			
Rachid Lounes	DVE		134	0.60	N/A			
Mohamed Bentahar	DIV		128	0.57	N/A			
Willène Pilate	DVE		124	0.55	N/A			
Stéphane Lobbé	DIV		116	0.52	N/A			
Élise Lecoq	EXG		98	0.44	N/A			
Patrick d'Hondt	DVE		52	0.23	N/A			
Jonathan Wilson	EXG		48	0.21	N/A			
Mariz Lechesne	DIV		34	0.15	N/A			
Valid votes			22,376	97.89	-0.58	18,542	93.12	+12.36
Blank votes			318	1.39	N/A	865	4.34	N/A
Null votes			164	0.72	N/A	505	2.54	N/A
Turnout			22,858	36.99	-9.24	19,912	32.22	-1.55
Abstentions			38,945	63.01	+9.24	41,892	67.78	+1.55
Registered voters			61,803			61,804		
Source: Ministry of the Interior
Result						LFI GAIN FROM PS		

=== 2012 ===
Candidate	Party	Alliance	First round			Second round		
Candidate	Party	Alliance	Votes	%	+/–	Votes	%	+/–
Bruno Le Roux	PS		11,928	47.46	+12.80	15,060	100.00	+37.29
Hayat Dhalfa*	PCF	FG	3,573	14.22	+1.56			
Salah Bourdi	NC		2,755	10.96	N/A			
Blandine Dejouy	FN	RBM	2,688	10.69	+5.67			
Mike Borowski	DVD		1,234	4.91	N/A			
Mamadou Keita	EELV		1,187	4.72	+1.25			
Youssef El Ouachouni	DIV		806	3.21	N/A			
Bernard Bres	EXD		320	1.27	N/A			
Naïma Amiri	EXG		274	1.09	N/A			
Cécile Abad	EXG		195	0.78	N/A			
Rosy Aline	DVD		110	0.44	N/A			
Elise Mbock	DIV		50	0.20	N/A			
Etienne Zoldi Dedieu	DIV		14	0.06	N/A			
Valid votes			25,134	98.47	+0.04	15,060	80.76	-16.14
Blank and null votes			390	1.53	-0.04	3,587	19.24	+16.14
Turnout			25,524	46.23	-3.97	18,647	33.77	-14.18
Abstentions			29,690	53.77	+3.97	36,567	66.23	+14.18
Registered voters			55,214			55,214		
Source: Ministry of the Interior
Result						PS HOLD		

* Withdrew before the 2nd round

=== 2007 ===
Candidate	Party	Alliance	First round			Second round		
Candidate	Party	Alliance	Votes	%	+/–	Votes	%	+/–
Bruno Le Roux	PS		8,641	34.66	+4.78	14,699	62.71	+11.88
Briggitte Espinasse	UMP	MP	5,928	23.78	-9.54	8,740	37.29	-11.88
Hayat Dhalfa	PCF		3,157	12.66	+2.29			
Claire O'Petit	MoDem		1,683	6.75	N/A			
Patrick Rivallain	FN		1,251	5.02	-7.39			
William Delannoy	DIV		1,245	4.99	N/A			
Madjid Challal	LV		864	3.47	-2.86			
Nathalie Oliver	LCR		807	3.24	+1.27			
Marianne Courrejou	DVE		271	1.09	N/A			
Monique Tesseyre	LO		268	1.08	-0.55			
Laurent Stocco	MPF		253	1.01	N/A			
Janine Maurice-Bellay	DVG		218	0.87	N/A			
Patrick Pedrot	EXG		165	0.66	N/A			
Eric Orpeliere	DIV		141	0.57	N/A			
Nicolas Dejeu	DIV		32	0.13	N/A			
Gwen-Aëlle Trombert	DIV		4	0.02	N/A			
Louis Campana	DIV		0	0.00	N/A			
Valid votes			24,928	98.43	-0.11	23,439	96.90	+0.88
Blank and null votes			397	1.57	+0.11	750	3.10	-0.88
Turnout			25,325	50.20	-6.95	24,189	47.95	-5.47
Abstentions			25,123	49.80	+6.95	26,259	52.05	+5.47
Registered voters			50,448			50,448		
Source: Ministry of the Interior
Result						PS HOLD		

=== 2002 ===
Candidate	Party	Alliance	First round			Second round		
Candidate	Party	Alliance	Votes	%	+/–	Votes	%	+/–
Hervé Chevreau	UDF	UPMP	8,023	33.32	+15.14	10,783	49.17	N/A
Bruno Le Roux	PS		7,194	29.88	+2.09	11,145	50.83	-17.21
Sylvie Collet	FN		2,987	12.41	-7.36			
Pierre Zarka	PCF		2,496	10.37	-8.24			
Michel Bourgain	LV		1,524	6.33	+1.95			
Jean-Yves Lesage	LCR		474	1.97	N/A			
Hayat Dhalfa	PR		462	1.92	+0.28			
Monique Tesseyre	LO		392	1.63	-1.44			
Nicole Lemetayer	MNR		236	0.98	N/A			
Yvette Ruiz-Lopez	GE		113	0.47	-2.55			
Célina Mélane	DIV		110	0.46	N/A			
Jean-Benoît Charrassin	DIV		64	0.27	N/A			
Paulette Laurier	DVD		1	0.00	N/A			
Valid votes			24,076	98.54	+1.48	21,928	96.02	+4.27
Blank and null votes			356	1.46	-1.48	908	3.98	-4.27
Turnout			24,432	57.15	-4.93	22,836	53.42	-10.14
Abstentions			18,316	42.85	+4.93	19,913	46.58	+10.14
Registered voters			42,748			42,749		
Source: National Assembly
Result						PS HOLD		

=== 1997 ===
Candidate	Party	Alliance	First round			Second round		
Candidate	Party	Alliance	Votes	%	+/–	Votes	%	+/–
Bruno Le Roux	PS	GP	7,691	27.79	+10.24	18,226	68.04	N/A
François-Xavier Sidos	FN		5,471	19.77	+0.98	8,562	31.96	N/A
Jacqueline Dambreville	PCF	GP	5,152	18.61	-0.38			
Raoul Béteille	RPR	Union	5,032	18.18	-8.79			
Michel Bourgain	LV	GP	1,211	4.38	-4.24			
Serge Le Balc'h	LO		850	3.07	N/A			
Clotilde Théret	GE		835	3.02	N/A			
Hervé Chevreau	LDI		549	1.98	N/A			
Bernard Perego	MDC	GP	455	1.64	N/A			
Marc Dumez	PT		192	0.69	N/A			
Pascale Oster	DIV		116	0.42	N/A			
Emmanuel Raymond	MDR		75	0.27	N/A			
Tuan Raban	EXD		49	0.18	N/A			
Valid votes			27,678	97.06	+0.70	26,788	91.75	-1.14
Blank and null votes			840	2.94	-0.70	2,409	8.25	+1.14
Turnout			28,518	62.08	+0.21	29,197	63.56	+2.44
Abstentions			17,419	37.92	-0.21	16,741	36.44	-2.44
Registered voters			45,937			45,938		
Source: National Assembly
Result						PS GAIN FROM DVD		

=== 1993 ===
Candidate	Party	Alliance	First round			Second round		
Candidate	Party	Alliance	Votes	%	+/–	Votes	%	+/–
Raoul Beteille	DVD	UPF	7,972	26.97		14,630	51.96	
Josiane Andros	PCF		5,613	18.99		13,525	48.04	
Pierre Pauty	FN		5,555	18.79				
Gilbert Bonnemaison	PS	ADFP	5,188	17.55				
Michel Bourgain	LV		2,548	8.62				
Georges Fournier	NERNA		811	2.74				
Serge Le Balc'h	EXG		711	2.41				
Jean-Philippe Suire	DVD		617	2.09				
Yvon Magne	DVE		396	1.34				
Roland Helie	EXD		151	0.51				
Valid votes			29,562	96.36		28,155	92.89	
Invalid votes			1,117	3.64		2,155	7.11	
Turnout			30,679	61.87		30,310	61.12	
Abstentions			18,909	38.13		19,278	38.88	
Registered voters			49,588			49,588		
Source: Ministry of the Interior
Result						DVD GAIN FROM PS		
