= Ecologist Party =

Political party in France

Ecologist Party Parti écologiste
- President: François de Rugy
- President in the National Assembly: Gilles Le Gendre
- Founders: François de Rugy; Jean-Vincent Placé
- Founded: 2 September 2015
- Split from: The Ecologists
- Ideology: Green politics; Green liberalism; Pro-Europeanism
- Political position: Centre-left
- National affiliation: Ensemble Citoyens (since 2021); La République En Marche! (since 2017); Union of Democrats and Ecologists (2015–2016)
- Colours: Blue, green
- National Assembly: 1 / 577
- Senate: 0 / 348

Website
- le-parti-ecologiste.fr

The Ecologist Party (French: Parti écologiste, PÉ), founded as Écologistes !, is a centre-left French political party that holds pro-European views, created in September 2015 by François de Rugy, President of the Europe Ecology – The Greens (EELV) group in the National Assembly and Jean-Vincent Placé, the President of the EELV group in the Senate.

This party was initially created as a reaction to the decision taken by EELV of making alliances with the Left Front. The aim of UDE founders was to create a reformist centre-left party, accepting globalization and market economy, and supporting president François Hollande. The founders of UDE declared they wanted to become a strong ally of the Socialist Party, and attract people from EELV or from the Democratic Movement.

Since 2017, the party is part of La Republique en Marche!
