= Emmanuelle Cosse =

French politician

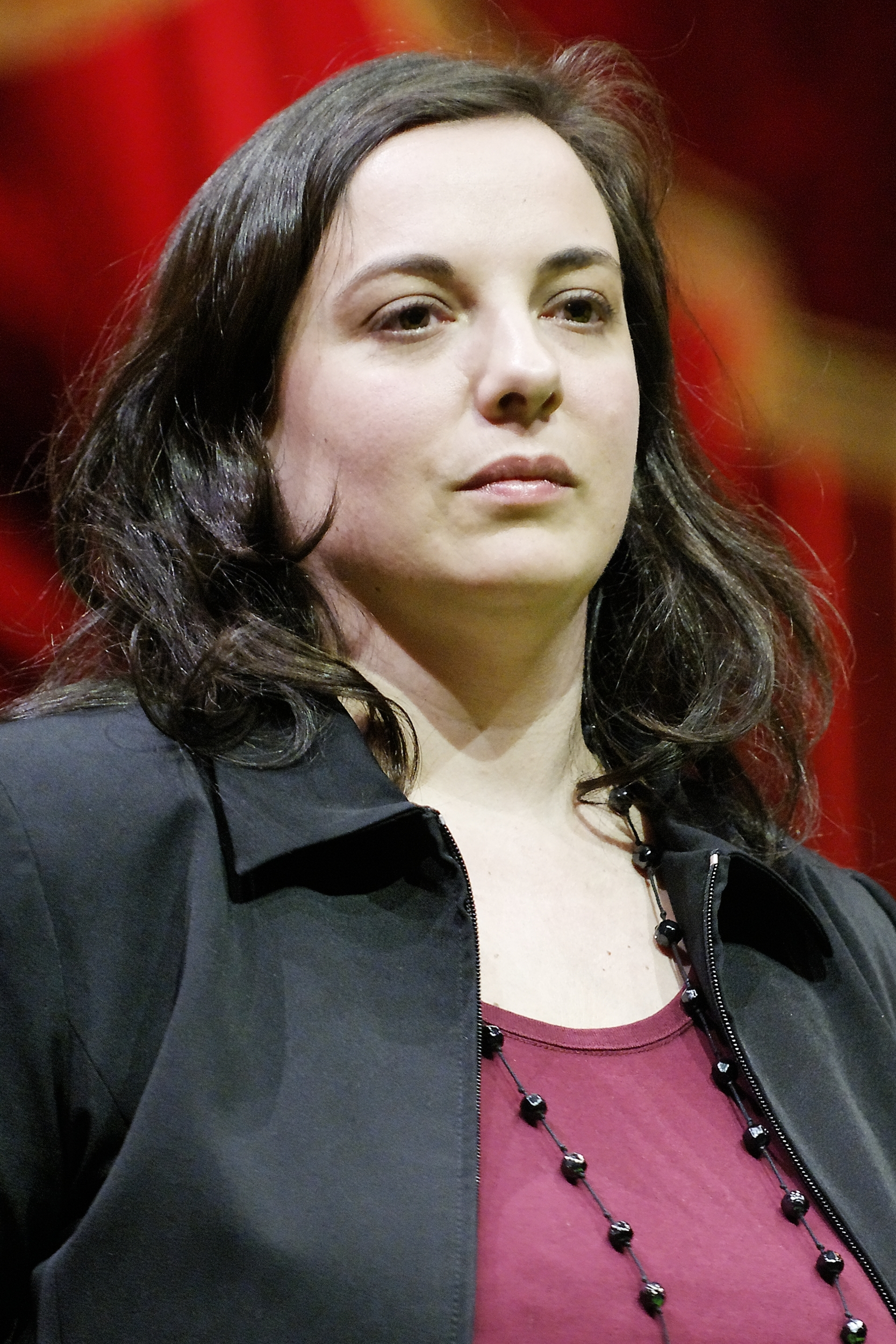
- Cosse in 2010

Minister of Housing and Sustainable Habitat
- In office 11 February 2016 – 10 May 2017
- President: François Hollande
- Prime Minister: Manuel Valls; Bernard Cazeneuve
- Preceded by: Sylvia Pinel
- Succeeded by: Richard Ferrand (Territorial Cohesion)

National Secretary of Europe Ecology – The Greens
- In office 30 November 2013 – 11 February 2016
- Preceded by: Pascal Durand
- Succeeded by: David Cormand

Member of the Regional Council of Île-de-France
- Incumbent
- Assumed office 26 March 2010

Personal details
- Born: 15 November 1974 (age 51) Paris, France
- Party: Europe Ecology – The Greens
- Spouse: Denis Baupin (m. 2015)

Emmanuelle Cosse (born 15 November 1974) is a French activist with LGBTQ and feminist groups, and a politician with the green party Europe Ecology – The Greens, as well as a journalist and magazine editor.

== Biography ==
A member of a prominent Leftist family, she first became an activist as a student with the Fédération indépendante et démocratique lycéenne.

The successor to Philippe Mangeot, from 1999 to 2001, she was president of ACT UP-Paris, the local chapter of international LGBT rights and HIV/AIDS direct action group ACT UP. She was Co-Editor in Chief of the high-profile magazine Regards, after having worked for several newspapers.

== Political career ==
She ran as a candidate with the party Europe Écologie (now Europe Écologie – Les Verts) during the 2010 French regional elections, in Île-de-France, which includes the city of Paris. She is currently Vice-President of the Regional Council of Île-de-France, administering the housing portfolio, since 26 March 2010. On 30 November 2013, she is elected National Secretary (in French secrétaire nationale) of Europe Écologie – Les Verts (EELV).

On 11 February 2016, Cosse was appointed to French President François Hollande's cabinet as Minister for Housing and Sustainable Habitat. She resigned from her position as National Secretary of Europe Ecology – Les Verts on the same day.

Ahead of the Socialist Party's 2017 primaries, Cosse publicly endorsed François de Rugy as the left-wing parties' candidate for the presidential election later that year.
