= Gérard Voisin =

French politician (born 1945)

Gérard Voisin (French pronunciation: [ʒeʁaʁ vwazɛ̃]; born August 18, 1945 in Mâcon, Saône-et-Loire) is a member of the National Assembly of France. He represents the Saône-et-Loire department, and is a member of the Union for a Popular Movement.
