= Juliette Méadel =

French politician (born 1974)

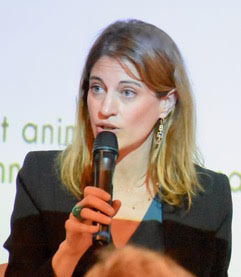
- Méadel in 2019

Minister Delegate for the City
- In office 23 December 2024 – 5 October 2025
- Prime Minister: François Bayrou
- Preceded by: Valérie Létard (Note: As Minister of Housing and Urban Renovation.)
- Succeeded by: Vincent Jeanbrun (Note: As Minister of the City and Housing.)

Secretary of State for Victims Aid
- In office 11 February 2016 – 10 May 2017
- Prime Minister: Manuel Valls; Bernard Cazeneuve
- Preceded by: Nicole Guedj (Note: As Secretary of State for Victims Rights, 2005.)
- Succeeded by: Position abolished

Personal details
- Born: Juliette Laure Jeanne Méadel; 17 April 1974 (age 52) Paris, France
- Party: Socialist Party (2005–2018); Progressist Federation (since 2022)
- Relatives: Cécile Méadel (sister)

Juliette Laure Jeanne Méadel (French pronunciation: [ʒyljɛt meadɛl]; born 17 April 1974) is a French lawyer and politician who served as Secretary of State for Victims Aid from 2016 to 2017 and Minister Delegate for the City from 2024 to 2025.

== Early life and education ==
Méadel was born in Paris in 1974, as the daughter of Lucien Méadel, who served as chief of staff to minister of agriculture Édith Cresson from 1981 to 1982, and a mother who worked as a teacher. She is the sister of sociologist Cécile Méadel. She grew up in a housing estate on the Rue du Commandant-René-Mouchotte in the 14th arrondissement. At the age of 7 in 1981, she celebrated the election victory of François Mitterrand alongside her parents at Rue Soufflot.

== Professional career ==
Méadel began working as a lawyer at Cozen O'Connor in 1998, and joined Linklaters & Alliance in 2000.

From 2009 to 2011, Méadel studied at the École nationale d'administration.

In 2011, she began working at the macroeconomic policy department of the Direction générale du Trésor. In 2012, she founded the association L'avenir n'attend pas, which she describes as a "do tank" in contrast to a think tank. From January to November 2013, she was the head of the think tank Terra Nova.

== Political career ==
Méadel first began campaigning for the Socialist Party in 2000. In the 2004 Île-de-France regional election, she was a candidate for the Regional Council of Île-de-France. From 2004 to 2009, she served as an adviser to Senator Jean-Pierre Bel.

In 2005, Méadel became a member of the national secretariat of the Socialist Party. During the 2005 European Constitution referendum, she campaigned for ratification of the Treaty establishing a Constitution for Europe. During the 2007 presidential election, she served as an adviser to the Socialist Party's candidate Ségolène Royal.

From 2008 to 2014, Méadel was a member of the municipal arrondissement council of the 14th arrondissement.

During the 2012 presidential election, Méadel was a member of François Hollande's campaign team, as the leader of an anti-discrimination policy working group. She was the leader of the Question de principes motion at the Socialist Party's Toulouse Congress in 2012, and was elected member of the party's national council, serving as its national secretary of industry until 2014. From 2014 to 2016, she served as spokesperson of the Socialist Party. At the Poitiers Congress in 2015, she supported the motion of Jean-Christophe Cambadélis and Manuel Valls.

Méadel was appointed secretary of state for victims in 2016, when the post was reestablished as a result of the Charlie Hebdo shooting and the November 2015 Paris attacks. She sought to establish a single point of contact between the Ministry of Foreign Affairs, the Ministry of Justice, the Ministry of the Interior and the Ministry of Health. The first major event during her tenure was the crash of EgyptAir Flight 804. She also oversaw the 2016 Nice truck attack. She left office in 2017, when the position was abolished.

Méadel supported Manuel Valls in the 2017 Socialist Party presidential primary, and endorsed Emmanuel Macron in the presidential election following Valls's loss to Benoît Hamon. She believed that Hamon would be unable to qualify for the second round of the election, and sought to prevent a runoff between Marine Le Pen and François Fillon. In the 2017 legislative election, she was a candidate for the National Assembly in Seine-et-Marne's 10th constituency. In February 2018, she was appointed member of the working group on the Service national universel. She was expelled from the Socialist Party ahead of the 2018 Aubervilliers Congress, due to her support for Macron. In October 2018, she was considered for the position of secretary of state for the Service national universel.

In the 2020 municipal elections, Méadel was elected municipal councillor of Montrouge. In 2022, she co-founded the political party Fédération Progressiste. In the 2024 European Parliament election, she was a candidate for member of the European Parliament, in fourth position on the list of the Radical Party of the Left.

== Honours ==
- Knight of the Legion of Honour (2024)
