= Jean-Marc Todeschini =

French politician

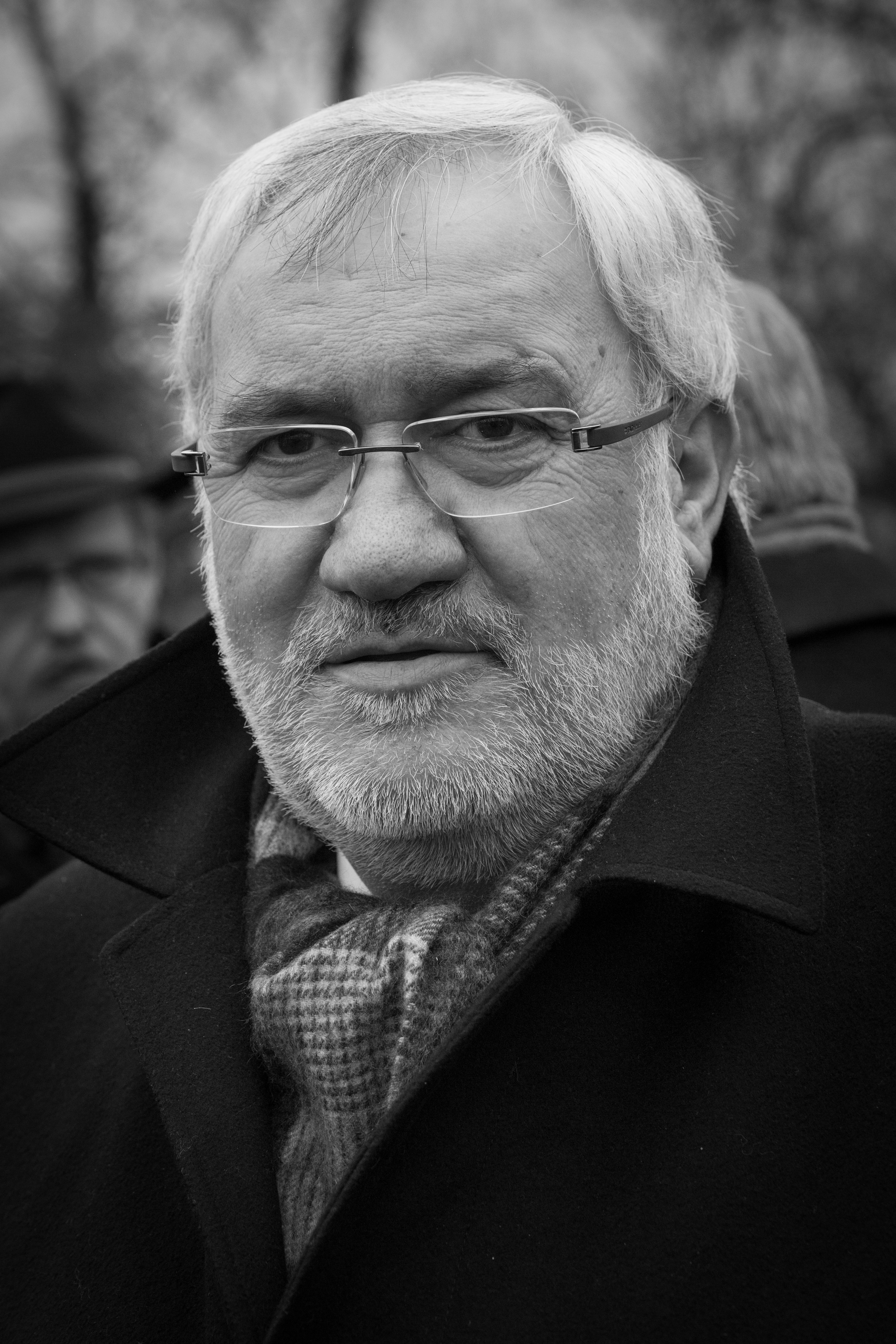
- Jean-Marc Todeschini in 2015

Member of the French Senate for Moselle
- Incumbent
- Assumed office 18 June 2017
- Preceded by: Patrick Abate

Personal details
- Born: 12 March 1952 (age 74) Longwy, France
- Party: Socialist Party
- Profession: Teacher

Jean-Marc Todeschini (born 12 March 1952) is a former member of the Senate of France, who represented the Moselle department. He is a member of the Socialist Party. Teacher and elementary school principal and finally Inspector of Education, he was elected Senator of Moselle on 23 September 2001. Taking advantage of the great division of the right, left Moselle in 2001 succeeded in obtaining for the first time three senators. On 25 September 2011 he was elected Senator of Moselle, and on 5 October 2011 he was appointed Prime Quaestor Senate.
