= Jean-Claude Lenoir =

French politician

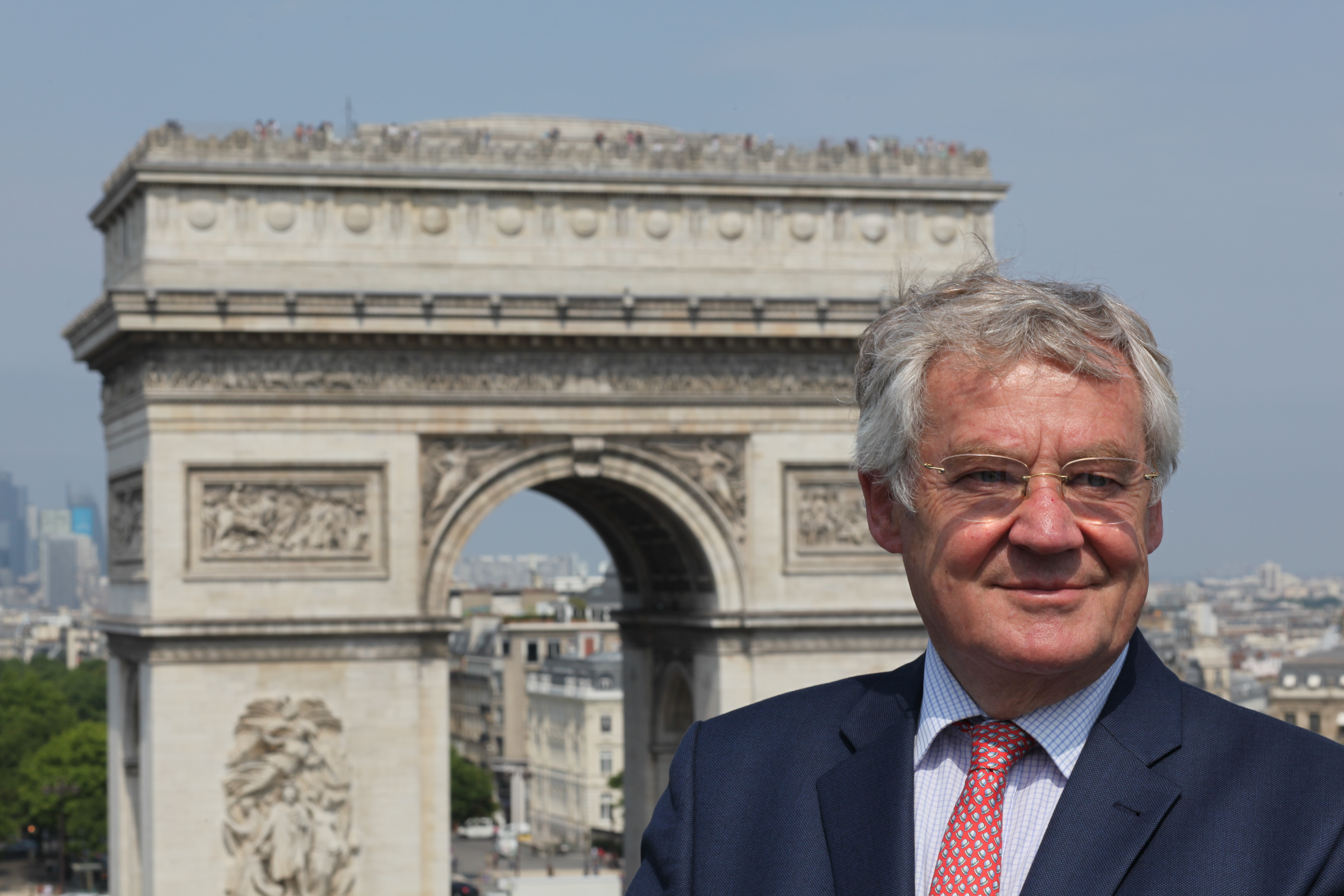

Member of the French Senate for Orne
- In office 1 October 2011 – 30 September 2017
- Preceded by: Alain Lambert

Member of the National Assembly for Orne's 2nd constituency
- In office 2 April 1993 – 30 September 2011
- Preceded by: Francis Geng
- Succeeded by: Véronique Louwagie

Personal details
- Born: 27 December 1944 (age 81) Mortagne-au-Perche, France
- Party: UMP

Jean-Claude Lenoir (born 27 December 1944) in Mortagne-au-Perche is a member of the National Assembly of France between 1993 and 2012. He represented Orne's 2nd constituency, and is a member of the Union for a Popular Movement.
