= List of senators of Essonne =

Location of Essonne in France

Reorganization of the former Seine-et-Oise and Seine departments in 1968. Essonne in the south.

Following is a list of senators of Essonne, people who have represented the department of Essonne in the Senate of France. The department was created in 1968 during a reorganization of the former Seine-et-Oise and Seine departments.

Senators for Essonne under the French Fifth Republic:

Term	Name	Group	Notes
1968–1977	Jean Colin	Union Centriste	
1968–1977	Louis Namy	Communiste	Resigned 1 November 1975
1968–1977	Raymond Brosseau	Communiste	From 1 November 1975 in place of Louis Namy
1968–1977	Pierre Prost	None	
1977–1986	Pierre Ceccaldi-Pavard	Union Centriste	
1977–1986	Jean Colin	Union Centriste	
1977–1986	Pierre Gamboa	Communiste	
1977–1986	Pierre Noé	Socialiste	
1977–1986	Jean Ooghe	Communiste	
1986–1995	Jean Colin	Union Centriste	resigned
1986–1995	Jean-Jacques Robert	Rassemblement pour la République	From 14 May 1988 in place of Jean Colin
1986–1995	Paul Loridant	Communiste républicain citoyen et écologiste	
1986–1995	Jean-Luc Mélenchon	Communiste, Républicain, Citoyen etc. (Note: Communiste, Républicain, Citoyen et des Sénateurs du Parti de Gauche: Communist, Republican, Citizen and Senators of the Party of the Left)	
1986–1995	Jean Simonin	Rassemblement pour la République	Died in office 6 November 1993
1986–1995	Max Marest	Union pour un Mouvement Populaire	From 7 November 1993 in place of Jean Simonin
1986–1995	Robert Vizet	Communiste	
1995–2004	Xavier Dugoin	Rassemblement pour la République	Until 16 January 2001 (removed from office)
1995–2004	Laurent Béteille	Union pour un Mouvement Populaire	From 17 January 2001 in place of Xavier Dugoin
1995–2004	Paul Loridant	Communiste républicain citoyen et écologiste	
1995–2004	Jean-Luc Mélenchon	Communiste, Républicain, Citoyen etc.	Until 27 April 2000 (named to cabinet)
1995–2004	Claire-Lise Campion	Socialiste et républicain	From 28 April 2000 in place of Jean-Luc Mélenchon
1995–2004	Michel Pelchat	Union pour un Mouvement Populaire	Died in office 12 February 2004
1995–2004	Bernard Mantienne	Union Centriste	From 13 February 2004 in place of Michel Pelchat
1995–2004	Jean-Jacques Robert	Rassemblement pour la République	Died in office 18 March 2000
1995–2004	Max Marest	Union pour un Mouvement Populaire	From 19 March 2000 in place of Jean-Jacques Robert
2004–2011	Laurent Béteille	Union pour un Mouvement Populaire	
2004–2011	Claire-Lise Campion	Socialiste et républicain	
2004–2011	Serge Dassault	Les Républicains	
2004–2011	Jean-Luc Mélenchon	Communiste, Républicain, Citoyen etc.	Until 7 January 2010 (elected European deputy)
2004–2011	Marie-Agnès Labarre	Communiste, Républicain, Citoyen etc.	From 8 January 2010 in place of Jean-Luc Mélenchon
2004–2011	Bernard Véra	Communiste républicain et citoyen	
2011–2017	Michel Berson	La République En Marche	
2011–2017	Claire-Lise Campion	Socialiste et républicain	
2011–2017	Serge Dassault	Les Républicains	
2011–2017	Vincent Delahaye	Union Centriste	
2011–2017	Jean-Vincent Placé	Socialiste et républicain	Until 11 March 2016 (named to cabinet)
2011–2017	Bernard Vera	Communiste républicain et citoyen	From 12 March 2016 in place of Jean-Vincent Placé; Until 17 June 2017 (return of Placé to senate)
2011–2017	Jean-Vincent Placé	Socialiste et républicain	Returned to senate 18 June 2017
2017–2023	Laure Darcos	Les Républicains	
2017–2023	Vincent Delahaye	Union Centriste	
2017–2023	Jocelyne Guidez	Union Centriste	
2017–2023	Jean-Raymond Hugonet	Les Républicains	
2017–2023	Olivier Léonhardt	Rassemblement Démocratique et Social Européen	

== Sources ==
- Liste des anciens sénateurs de la Vème République par circonscription (in French), Sénat de France
- Liste par département – Essonne (in French), Sénat de France
