= Essonne's 5th constituency =

Constituency of the National Assembly of France

5th constituency of Essonne
- inline Constituency of the National Assembly of France

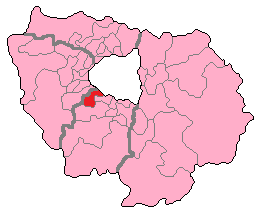
- Essonne's 5th Constituency shown within Île-de-France
- Deputy: Paul Midy; RE
- Department: Essonne
- Cantons: Bièvres, Gif-sur-Yvette, Orsay, Les Ulis
- Registered voters: 68,395

The 5th constituency of Essonne is a French legislative constituency in the Essonne département.

== Description ==
The 5th constituency of Essonne covers the north west corner of the department and includes the suburbs of Les Ulis and Orsay both of which lie on the southern edge of the Paris urban area. The seat was created in 1986 as the number of seats in Essonne grew from four to ten reflecting the rapidly increasing population and urbanisation of the department. The largest town in the constituency Les Ulis is a new town constructed in the 1970s and is home to a large population of African and Arab origin.

== Historic Representation ==
Election	Member	Party
1988	Michel Pelchat	UDF
1993	Michel Pelchat	UDF
1995	Jean-Marc Salinier	PS
1997	Pierre Lasbordes	RPR
2002	Pierre Lasbordes	UMP
2007	Pierre Lasbordes	UMP
2012	Maud Olivier	PS
2017	Cédric Villani	LREM
2020	Cédric Villani	EDS
2022	Paul Midy	RE

== Election results ==
=== 2024 ===
Candidate	Party	Alliance	First round			Second round		
Candidate	Party	Alliance	Votes	%	+/–	Votes	%	+/–
Pierre Larrouturou	DVG	NFP	19,107	37.93	-0.27	21,683	48.26	-1.72
Paul Midy	RE	ENS	16,362	32.48	+1.95	23,248	51.74	+1.72
Laetitia Horvelin	RN		7,692	15.27	+8.12			
François Guy Trébulle	DIV		4,998	9.92	N/A			
Marianne Billoir	DVE		898	1.78	N/A			
Wendy Lonchampt	REC		627	1.78	-2.08			
Benoît Odille	DIV		380	0.75	+0.06			
Didier Paxion	LO		317	0.63	-0.72			
Valid votes			50,381	98.58	+0.09	44,931	93.31	-2.59
Blank votes			501	0.98	-0.22	2,407	5.00	+2.06
Null votes			227	0.44	+0.13	814	1.69	+0.53
Turnout			51,109	74.39	+16.82	48,152	70.07	+13.18
Abstentions			17,597	25.61	-16.82	20,566	29.93	-13.18
Registered voters			68,706			68,718		
Source: Ministry of the Interior, Le Monde
Result						RE HOLD		

=== 2022 ===
Legislative Election 2022: Essonne's 5th constituency
Party	Candidate	Votes	%	±%
GE (NUPÉS)	Cédric Villani	14,830	38.20	+14.41
LREM (Ensemble)	Paul Midy	11,849	30.53	-16.93
LR (UDC)	Michel Bournat	6,222	16.03	−0.79
RN	Christophe Debon	2,774	7.15	+2.47
REC	Denise Barbarat	1,497	3.86	N/A
Others	N/A	1,645		
Turnout		39,410	57.57	−0.60
2nd round result
LREM (Ensemble)	Paul Midy	18,687	50.03	-19.33
GE (NUPÉS)	Cédric Villani	18,668	49.97	N/A
Turnout		37,355	56.89	
LREM hold				

=== 2017 ===
Legislative Election 2017: Essonne's 5th constituency
Party	Candidate	Votes	%	±%
LREM	Cédric Villani	18,883	47.46	
LR	Laure Darcos	6,691	16.82	
PS	Maud Olivier	4,162	10.46	
LFI	Sylvère Cala	3,786	9.52	
FN	Milvia Mangano	1,861	4.68	
EELV	Didier Missenard	1,515	3.81	
DLF	Aurélie Martin	799	2.01	
Others	N/A	2,087		
Turnout		39,784	58.17	
2nd round result
LREM	Cédric Villani	21,463	69.36	
LR	Laure Darcos	9,469	30.64	
Turnout		30,905	45.19	
LREM gain from PS		Swing		

=== 2012 ===
Legislative Election 2012: Essonne's 5th constituency
Party	Candidate	Votes	%	±%
PS	Maud Olivier	15,637	37.32	
UMP	Hervé Hocquard	13,151	31.38	
FN	Pierre Guillermain	2,732	6.52	
FG	Gilles Laschon	2,552	6.09	
EELV	Marie-Pierre Digard	2,065	4.93	
DVG	Paul Loridant	1,868	4.46	
MoDem	Jean-Paul Mordefroid	1,804	4.31	
Others	N/A	2,094		
Turnout		41,903	62.84	
2nd round result
PS	Maud Olivier	22,472	54.81	
UMP	Hervé Hocquard	18,528	45.19	
Turnout		41,000	61.48	
PS gain from UMP				

=== 2007 ===
Legislative Election 2007: Essonne's 5th constituency
Party	Candidate	Votes	%	±%
UMP	Pierre Lasbordes	18,045	41.78	
PS	Maud Olivier	10,928	25.30	
MoDem	Dimitri Tchoreloff	5,707	13.21	
DVG	Paul Loridant	2,751	6.37	
LV	Jean-Vincent Placé	1,715	3.97	
PCF	Joëlle Perinet	977	2.26	
FN	Pierre Lemaire	923	2.14	
Others	N/A	2,142		
Turnout		43,579	66.37	
2nd round result
UMP	Pierre Lasbordes	20,216	50.25	
PS	Maud Olivier	20,016	49.75	
Turnout		41,203	62.67	
UMP hold				

=== 2002 ===
Legislative Election 2002: Essonne's 5th constituency
Party	Candidate	Votes	%	±%
UMP	Pierre Lasbordes	19,693	45.81	
LV	Stéphane Pocrain	13,310	30.96	
PR	Éric Halphen	4,529	10.54	
FN	Sandra Le Bot	2,322	5.40	
Others	N/A	3,131		
Turnout		43,519	71.12	
2nd round result
UMP	Pierre Lasbordes	21,510	53.76	
LV	Stéphane Pocrain	18,500	46.24	
Turnout		41,020	67.04	
UMP hold				

=== 1997 ===
Legislative Election 1997: Essonne's 5th constituency
Party	Candidate	Votes	%	±%
RPR	Pierre Lasbordes	13,534	33.36	
PS	Jean-Marc Salinier	12,357	30.46	
FN	Jean Lyssandre	3,834	9.45	
PCF	Dominique Crozat	2,702	6.66	
GE	Anne d'Espinose de la Caillerie	1,673	4.12	
Far left	Claude Thomas-Colombier	1,663	4.10	
DVD	Vincent Pedoia	1,375	3.39	
LO	Nicole Poupinot	1,136	2.80	
DIV	François Silva	825	2.03	
Others	N/A	1,471		
Turnout		42,061	68.30	
2nd round result
RPR	Pierre Lasbordes	21,605	50.14	
PS	Jean-Marc Salinier	21,487	49.86	
Turnout		45,008	73.08	
RPR hold				

== Sources ==
Official results of French elections from 2002: "Résultats électoraux officiels en France" (in French).
