= Paul Midy =

French politician (born 1983)

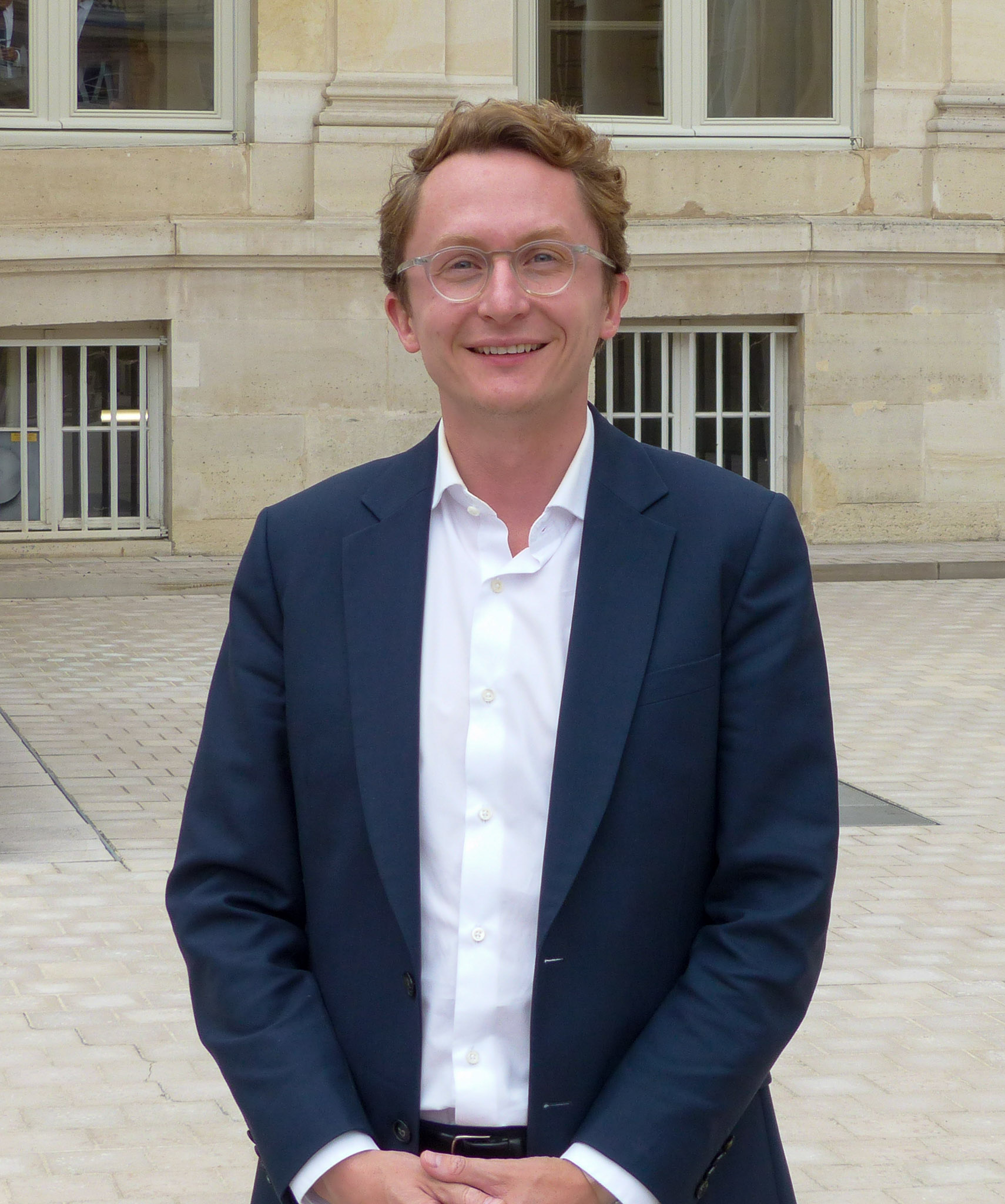

Member of the National Assembly for Essonne's 5th constituency
- Incumbent
- Assumed office 22 June 2022
- Preceded by: Cédric Villani

Personal details
- Born: 25 January 1983 (age 43) Fontainebleau, France
- Party: Renaissance (2016–present)
- Other political affiliations: Union for a Popular Movement (formerly)
- Education: École polytechnique; Columbia University

Paul Midy (French pronunciation: [pɔl midi]; born 25 January 1983) is a French business executive and politician. As a member of Renaissance (RE, formerly La République En Marche!) he was elected to represent the 5th constituency of the Essonne department in the National Assembly in 2022 legislative election.

== Early life and education ==
Midy was born in Fontainebleau. He studied at the École polytechnique and earned a Master's degree in applied mathematics from Columbia University in the United States.

== Business career ==
Midy worked for the American consulting firm McKinsey & Company from 2007 to 2014, rising to associate partner, then as an executive with the online retailer Jumia; he was chief executive of Jumia Travel, in 2017 became chief marketing officer of Jumia, and at its launch in early 2018 served as CEO of Jumia One, the company's payment app. In 2018 he became chief executive of the food delivery company Frichti.

== Political career ==
Midy was a youth activist with the Union for a Popular Movement. He challenged the legality of support by the regional transport agency Syndicat des transports d'Ile-de-France for Jean-Paul Huchon's 2010 re-election campaign as President of the Regional Council of Île-de-France; in 2011 Huchon's re-election was allowed to stand, but he was ordered to return funds he had been paid in reimbursement of his campaign costs. He served briefly on the municipal council of Fontainebleau in opposition to his former party.

Midy is a supporter of Emmanuel Macron; in 2017 he rejoined LREM, working with Stanislas Guerini and becoming deputy director general in 2019 and director general in 2020.

In the June 2022 national election, he was elected to the National Assembly, representing the 5th constituency of Essonne. He narrowly defeated Cédric Villani, who had been elected in 2017 as a member of LREM but stood for re-election for the New Ecological and Social People's Union.

== See also ==
- List of deputies of the 16th National Assembly of France
