= Maud Olivier =

French politician

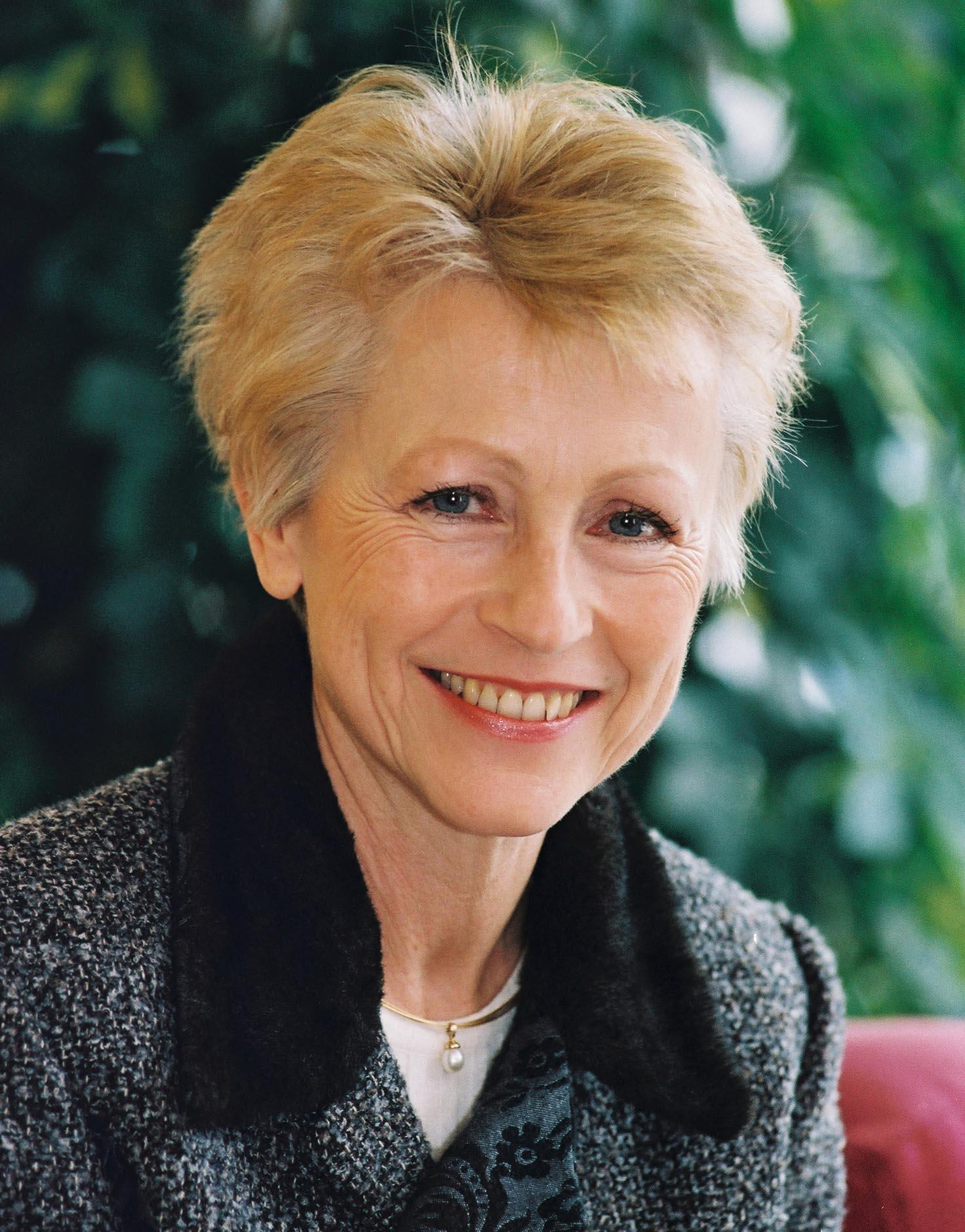

Member of the National Assembly for Essonne's 5th constituency
- In office 20 June 2012 – 20 June 2017
- Preceded by: Pierre Lasbordes
- Succeeded by: Cédric Villani
- Parliamentary group: SRC then SER

General Councillor of Essonne
- In office 20 January 2002 – 22 March 2015
- Preceded by: Jean-Marc Salinier
- Succeeded by: Dominique Fontenaille; Françoise Marhuenda
- Constituency: Canton of Les Ulis

Mayor of Les Ulis
- In office 17 March 2008 – 2 July 2012
- Preceded by: Paul Loridant
- Succeeded by: Sonia Dahou

Personal details
- Born: 20 February 1953 (age 73) Boulogne-Billancourt, France
- Party: PS

Maud Olivier (born 20 February 1953) is a French politician. A member of the Socialist Party, she was a Deputy for the Essonne's 5th constituency, General Councillor for the Canton of Les Ulis and Mayor of Les Ulis.

== Biography ==
=== Political career ===
Maud Olivier joined the Socialist Party in 1981, was elected to the list of the mayor of Les Ulis, Paul Loridant in 1983 and became first deputy in 2001. After the death of Jean-Marc Salinier, general councillor, on 20 January 2002, she was elected the general councillor from Les Ulis in May 2002 in a by-election. In 2004, she obtained the vice-presidency in charge of sports. During the legislative elections of 2007, candidate in the fifth constituency of Essonne, she lost, obtaining 49.75% of the votes against outgoing candidate Pierre Lasbordes.

During the cantonal elections of 2008, she was elected in the first round with 50.49% of the votes, the same year during the municipal elections, her list came first in the second round with 48.03% of the votes, ensuring her 27 seats out of the 35 of the city council.

In 2011, she was assigned the vice-presidency against discrimination and for the promotion of equality. That same year, during the senatorial elections, she was fourth (unelected) on the left-wing union list led by Jean-Vincent Placé which won 31.20% of the vote and two elected.

The 2012 legislative elections enabled her to win the fifth constituency with 54.81% of the vote in the second round against the UMP candidate mayor of Bièvres Hervé Hocquard. In accordance with the rule of multiple mandates, she resigned from the post of mayor of Les Ulis and the municipal council of the municipality in July 2012 and left her place to her fourth assistant Sonia Dahou (PS). During the 2017 legislative elections, Maud Olivier was eliminated in the first round with 10.46% of the vote, finishing behind the Republican candidate Laure Darcos and the representative of the presidential party En Marche! Cédric Villani, who won in the second round.

== Works ==
Maud Olivier, in consultation with the government, drew up the text of a bill strengthening the fight against the prostitution system, submitted to the office of the National Assembly in October 2013. It also includes a component of the fight against pimping and trafficking in human beings, a strengthening of sexuality education, and the empowerment of clients of prostitution by prohibiting the purchase of sex. A prison sentence for clients of prostitutes could be included in the penal code in the event of a repeat offence. This law was adopted on 13 April 2016.

Maud Olivier is the co-author (with Senator Jean-Pierre Leleux) of the OPECST report "Promoting and sharing scientific, technical and industrial cultures: an imperative" (French: Faire connaître et partager les cultures scientifique, technique et industrielle: un impératif).

Maud Olivier is the author of the information report of the delegation for women's rights and equality between men and women n° 4105 entitled "Gender studies: science in the service of real equality" (French: Études de genre: les sciences au service de l'égalité réelle).
