= Banks V. Telcos USSD Dispute =

Services charges dispute in Nigeria

Banks V. Telcos USSD Dispute is a 2019 commercial dispute in Nigeria between the banks and telecommunication companies about who should pay for the use of Unstructured Supplementary Service Data (USSD) for financial transactions such as funds transfer, checking account balance and mobile airtime top-ups. This service gained wide usage in Nigeria in 2015 and the dispute centered around who should pay the costs of these transactions.

The USSD services is widely promoted by commercial banks to optimize their financial services to customers and generate more revenue. But there was no agreement between telecommunications service providers and commercial banks as to who would offset USSD service charges.

== Dispute ==
In October 2019, telecommunications companies and commercial banks publicly engaged in dispute over USSD service charges following the refusal of the banks to pay for the services used by their customers. The banks then proposed to telcos to adopt end-user billing while receiving fees for the USSD transactions. But telcos disagreed for two reasons: First, this would be double billing to end-users as banks were already charging and receiving fees for USSD transactions. Second, telecommunications regulator, Nigeria Communications Commission, NCC had barred telcos from charging fees for financial transactions carried out on their USSD platforms. This put telcos at a loss.

On 21 October 2019 MTN adopted end-user billing proposed by the banks and announced a N4 per 20 seconds USSD service access to its subscribers. But NCC ordered immediate suspension of the service access charges. This was backed by the Central Bank of Nigeria, CBN who said USSD is a "sunk cost" (meaning not an additional cost on the infrastructure of the telecom company). But MTN argued that it is an additional cost on its network infrastructure. Later in December, the Association of Licensed Telecommunications of Nigeria (ALTON), in support of MTN said telcos had invested hugely in USSD service infrastructure and threatened to shut down if telcos would not be allowed to charge USSD service access fee proposing that telcos would only render free USSD service if banks stopped charging subscribers for same service. The Executive Vice Chairman, NCC at a meeting with the Association of Telecommunications Companies of Nigeria (ATCON) announced that banks owed mobile network operators N17 billion for services rendered within the period USSD service access charge was suspended.

In 2020, NCC reduced USSD service access charge to N1.63 from N4.86 and instructed that charges be billed via a corporate billing model, officially making banks responsible for paying the USSD service charge. The use of USSD increased by 14.5 per cent in March 2020, due to COVID-19 restrictions and in June same year, the value in monetary term was put at N390 billion and monthly average value of USSD transactions rose to N230 billion. Guaranty Trust Bank (GTB) alone reported ₦3.89 trillion in USSD transaction value for 2020. The USSD service charge owed to telcos by banks increased by 147 per cent (from N17 billion in 2019 to N42 billion in 2020). In March 2021, ALTON announced that telcos would withdraw services to financial institutions after securing an agreement with the NCC and disconnect Financial Service Providers (FSPs) from USSD services until banks clear the debt. Financial and telecom regulators, CBN and NCC on 16 March 2021 announced that it had resolved USSD service charge dispute by introducing a flat rate of N6.98 per USSD access. This replaced the corporate billing method introduced in 2020. This new resolution suffered a setback as the dispute between telcos and banks over the accumulated service charge debt lingered. While telcos maintained that what it is being owed by the banks had risen from N42 billion to N45 billion, the banks stated that they do not owe telcos accumulated USSD service charge.

== Banks suspend MTN ==
In April 2021, banks barred MTN subscribers for two days (2-4 April) from purchasing airtime from their bank accounts via USSD and banking mobile apps following MTN’s reduction of the commission it pays banks for airtime purchases on bank channels from 4.5 to 2.5 per cent. MTN then responded by introducing alternative channels for airtime top-up such as Sparkle, Konga Pay, MTN On-Demand, MTN Xtratime airtime loans, Flutterwave, Jumia Pay, OPay, Kuda, Carbon and BillsnPay. MTN later restored the 4.5 per cent service commission following the intervention of the CBN.
