= Carlo Cercignani =

Italian physicist and mathematician (1929–2010)

Carlo Cercignani (17 June 1939 in Teulada – 7 January 2010 in Milan) was an Italian mathematician known for his work on the kinetic theory of gases. His contributions to the study of Boltzmann's equation include the proof of the H-theorem for polyatomic gases. The Cercignani conjecture is named after him.

Cercignani's conjecture is "sometimes true and always almost true", as proved by the Fields medalist mathematician Cédric Villani.

He is the author of several monographs and more than 300 papers in kinetic theory, as well as of a biography of Boltzmann. Cercignani was member of the French Academy of Sciences and of the Accademia dei Lincei. He received the Humboldt Prize in 1994.

== Selected publications ==
=== Kinetic theory ===
- Cercignani, C. (2000). Rarefied gas dynamics. Cambridge University Press. ISBN 978-0521659925. MR 1307620.
- Cercignani, C.; Illner, R.; Pulvirenti, M. (1994). The mathematical theory of dilute gases. Applied Mathematical Sciences. Vol. 106. New York: Springer-Verlag. ISBN 0-387-94294-7.
- Cercignani, C. (1988). The Boltzmann equation and its applications. Applied Mathematical Sciences. Vol. 67. New York: Springer-Verlag. ISBN 0-387-96637-4. MR 1313028.
- Cercignani, C. (1990). Mathematical methods in kinetic theory (2nd ed.). New York: Plenum Press. ISBN 0-306-43460-1. MR 1069558.

=== History of science ===
- Cercignani, C. (1998). Ludwig Boltzmann. The man who trusted atoms. With a foreword by Roger Penrose. Oxford: Oxford University Press. ISBN 0-19-850154-4. MR 1700775.
