= Håvar Bauck =

Norwegian-born entrepreneur

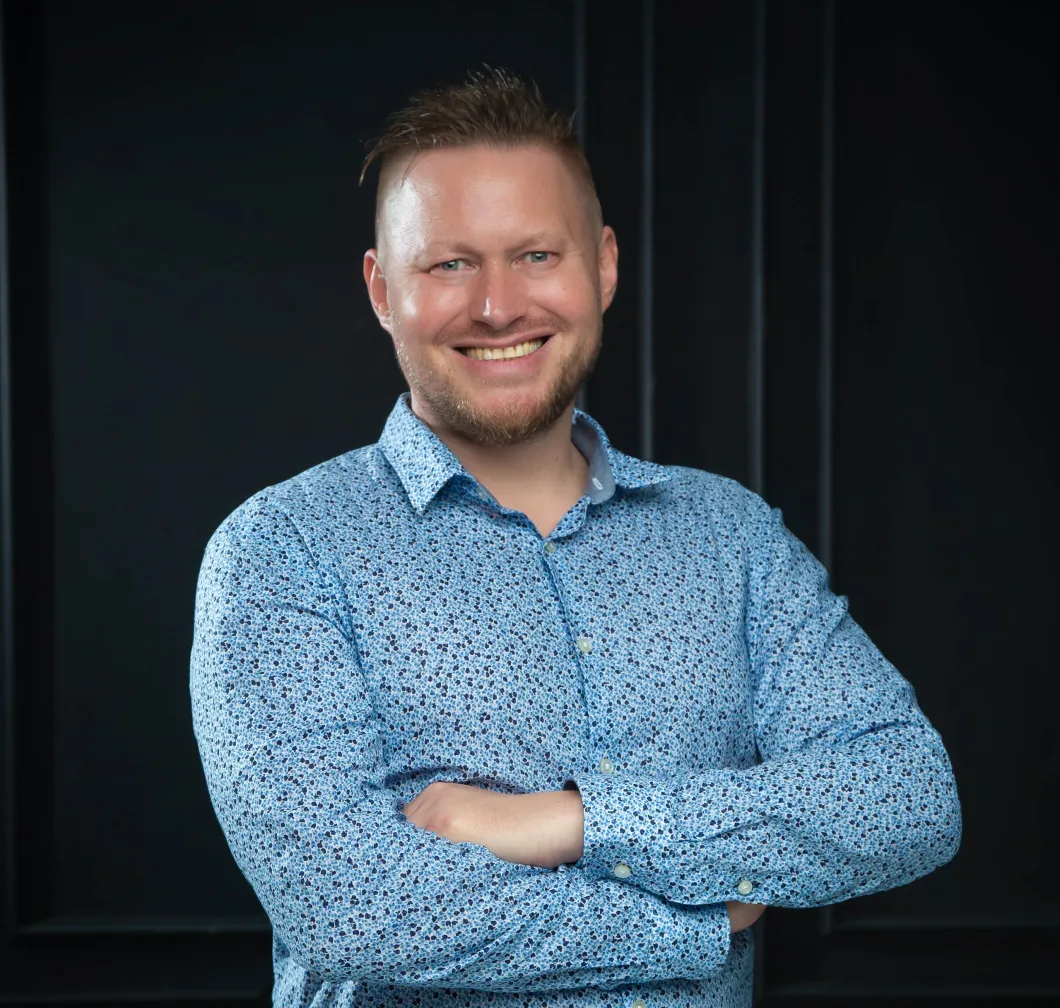
- Education: BI Norwegian Business School; Lycee Francais Rene Cassin d'Oslo
- Occupation: Entrepreneur
- Known for: Co-founder of HotelOnline, Savanna Sunrise, Nairobi Airport Hotel
- Website: https://www.bauck.com/

Håvar Bauck is a Norwegian-born entrepreneur, living in Nairobi, Kenya.

== Early life and education ==
Bauck grew up in Norway and Belgium. After graduating from high school at Lycee Francais Rene Cassin d'Oslo, he attended BI Norwegian Business School, where he completed a Master's degree in 2002.

== Business career ==
Bauck is one of the two founders of HotelOnline, a Nairobi-based, pan-African travel technology company that he co-founded with Endre Opdal in 2013. Before HotelOnline, Bauck was noted for his earlier venture, Nairobi Airport Hotel, the first known short-term apartment rental services in East Africa, and Savanna Sunrise, an early digital marketing service provider in East Africa. He later combined Savanna Sunrise with a Polish competitor to form HotelOnline in a cross-border merger in 2017.

In 2017, Bauck completed the what is thought to have been the first equity crowdfunding in Sub-Saharan Africa, raising USD 250,000 for HotelOnline. In 2019, he facilitated the merger between Kenyan traveltech startup Cloud9XP and tour operator Heartbeat Adventures, and was appointed the chairman of the merged company. In 2020, he merged Cloud9XP with HotelOnline.

In 2020 and 2021, Bauck was noted for acquiring several competitors during the COVID-19 pandemic and for the acquisition of Kenyan competitor HotelPlus in 2022, while raising an investment round from Korean travel technology unicorn and Softbank portfolio investee Yanolja in the same year.

== Public talks and writing ==
He is a public speaker and writer, delivering frequent talks and articles on tourism, investment and entrepreneurship in Africa.

== See also ==
- HotelOnline
