= Béteille =

Béteille is a French surname. Notable people with the surname include:

- Laurent Béteille (born 1948), French former politician
- Roger Béteille (1921–2019), French aeronautical engineer and businessman

== See also ==
- André Beteille (1934–2026), Indian sociologist, writer and academician of French-Indian descent
