= Jumia Travel =

Travel agency

- Industry: Travel, Ecommerce
- Founded: 2013
- Headquarters: Lagos, Lagos State, Nigeria; Nairobi, Kenya; Dakar, Senegal
- Key people: Joe Filter; Marek Zmyslowski (Co-founder); Estelle Verdier (Co-founder)
- Products: Online hotel reservations
- Number of employees: 250
- Website: travel.jumia.com

Jumia Travel emerged in 2013 as an online travel agency providing online hotel reservations across the African continent within the Africa Internet Group, now known as Jumia Group. In 2019, Jumia Travel was acquired by Travelstart. Travelstart took control of the sales, fulfilment and customer service aspects of Jumia Travel online booking websites in all its operating territories.

== History ==
Jumia Travel was founded in 2013 by the E-commerce platform Africa Internet Group (now Jumia Group) and is backed by MTN, Rocket Internet, Millicom, Orange, Axa and other financial partners. Operations were started in 2013 in Nigeria and Kenya by company's co-founder Marek Zmysłowski and Estelle Verdier. It was then expanded to other African countries in 2014, starting with Senegal, Cameroon, Ghana, Tanzania, Uganda and then Algeria.

In 2015, Paul Midy joined Jumia Travel as chief executive officer. In June 2016, the company was rebranded from Jovago.com to Jumia Travel, to join other companies under the parent company, Jumia Group.

In 2016, Jumia Travel signed a global partnership with AccorHotels to widen the range of luxury hotels offered on the website, and to work with the French hotel chain to develop their business interests Africa. In 2016 Jumia Group became the continent's first unicorn, being valued at over US$1 billion.

Starting as an online hotel booking portal, in February 2017 Jumia Travel unveiled its flight services in a bid to deepen its travel offerings to travelers in Africa and beyond and partnered with several local and international airlines on the continent including Arik Air, RwandAir Express, Qatar Airways, Emirates, Ethiopian Airlines, among others.

In September 2017, Jumia Travel appointed Joe Falter, founder of Jumia Food and EVP of On-Demand Services at Jumia Group as CEO in place of Paul Midy who exited the position for a different role at Jumia Group.

In January 2018, there was a scandal where the Jumia Travel co founder Marek Zmysłowski was accused by Nigerian investors of defrauding them of about $300 000 through his venture HotelOga.

The incident led to Marek being wanted by the Interpol and Nigerian police. Marek claimed that the Nigerian investors were trying to use the Interpol to extort him.

After 18 months of being on the Interpol Red Notice list, the Global Police removed files from the system and admitted that there was no basis for the Notice. Arrest warrants have been struck down by Nigeria Federal Court for the lack of evidence and diligent prosecution. Marek Zmysłowski was released the next day after the Nigerian Police failed to send supporting documentation to back up its claim. The court ruled that the police action against Zymslowski was unlawful and awarded him with an amount of two million naira (about $10 000) as compensation.

In May 2019, the Polish attorney general revoked the Nigerian extradition request due to a lack of evidence.

Marek went on to write a book about it titled, Chasing Black Unicorns. He also did a TED talk about the incident.

Following the incident, most of the assets in Zmyslowski's HotelOga were acquired by HotelOnline in 2017.

In December 2019, Jumia Travel was acquired by South African competitor Travelstart.

== Operations ==
The Jumia Travel website operates out of 10 local offices across Africa (in Lagos (Nigeria), Accra (Ghana), Dakar (Senegal), Abidjan (Ivory Coast), Algiers (Algeria), Douala (Cameroon), Kampala (Uganda), Dar es Salaam (Tanzania), Nairobi (Kenya) and, Addis Ababa (Ethiopia)) as well as offices in Europe, in Porto (Portugal) and Paris (France) and 3 regional headquarters in its main African markets (Lagos, Nairobi and Dakar). The website is available in English and French as well as in other African languages (Yoruba, Ibo, Hausa and Swahili), making Jumia Travel the first global travel agency to use local African languages on its website. The customer service provides support 24/7 out of its African offices.

In East Africa Jumia Travel offers both resident and non-resident rates to encourage people living in the region to travel to neighboring countries. Customers can pay using local payment options including mobile payment applications such as M-Pesa or MTN's mobile money.

Jumia Travel uses mobile apps, Extranet, Progressive Web App and can provide customer support on tools like WhatsApp, Viber for Mobile, following the growing internet and smartphone penetration in Africa.

== Awards ==
In 2015, the company won "Best Hotel Booking Portal", "Leading Online Hotel Booking Company" and the "Best Use of Technology" in Nigeria (Lagos 2015).

Jumia Travel organizes also Travel Awards in Nigeria and other countries, recognizing major players in the travel industry from Hotels to Travel Bloggers and Journalists.

== TV interviews ==
- CNBC AFRICA's 2014-09-23
- CCTV AFRICA 2014-09-29: l Jovago wants to shed light on less-known destinations in Africa. » Interview Estelle Verdier, Managing Director Jovago East Africa
- RTS1 Radiodiffusion Télévision Sénégalaise- 2015-03-15: Jovago wants to promote tourism in Senegal

== See also ==
- Jumia
