= Olivier Léonhardt =

French politician (1964–2022)

Member of the French Senate
- In office 1 October 2017 – 2 February 2022
- Succeeded by: Daphné Ract-Madoux
- Constituency: Essonne

President of the Communauté d'agglomération Cœur d'Essonne
- In office 11 January 2016 – 12 October 2017
- Preceded by: position established
- Succeeded by: Éric Braive

Mayor of Sainte-Geneviève-des-Bois
- In office 18 March 2001 – 18 October 2017
- Preceded by: Pierre Champion
- Succeeded by: Frédéric Petitta

Personal details
- Born: 29 January 1964 Suresnes, France
- Died: 2 February 2022 (aged 58) France
- Party: PS; DVG

Olivier Léonhardt (29 January 1964 – 2 February 2022) was a French politician. A member of the Socialist Party and later the Miscellaneous left, he served in the Senate from 2017 until his death. He died from cancer on 2 February 2022, at the age of 58.
