= Pierre Lasbordes =

French politician (born 1946)

Member of the National Assembly for Essonne's 5th constituency
- In office 1997–2012
- Preceded by: Jean-Marc Salinier
- Succeeded by: Maud Olivier

Personal details
- Born: May 13, 1946 (age 79) Meaux, France
- Party: RPR, UMP

Pierre Lasbordes (born 13 May 1946 in Meaux) was a member of the National Assembly of France. He represented Essonne's 5th constituency from 1997 to 2012, and was a member of the Union for a Popular Movement.
