= Raphael Afaedor =

Ghanaian entrepreneur

- Born: Raphael Kofi Afaedor; Ghana
- Education: Czech Technical University in Prague; University of New York in Prague; Harvard Business School
- Occupations: Entrepreneur; Business executive
- Years active: 2012–present
- Known for: E-commerce and technology startups
- Title: Co-founder at Jumia, Supermart.ng and Kyosk Digital Services

Raphael Kofi Afaedor is a Ghanaian technology and e-commerce entrepreneur, known for his work in African digital commerce and retail infrastructure. He co-founded Jumia Group in 2012, and was CEO until 2014. In 2014, he co-founded Supermart.ng, an online grocery and consumer goods platform in Nigeria, where he was CEO until 2019. In 2019, Afaedor co-founded Kyosk Digital Services, a Nairobi-based e-commerce and technology company focused on digitizing informal retail trade in Africa, and was CEO until 2025.

He began his career as a software engineer at Monster.com in 2004 before moving into product management and later investment management at Goldman Sachs in London in 2008. From 2009 to 2011, he held senior commercial roles at Notore Plc.

== Early life and education ==
Raphael Kofi Afaedor was born in Ghana. Raphael attended Presbyterian School in Accra from 1988 to 1995. Afaedor earned both bachelor’s and master’s degrees in computer science from the Czech Technical University in Prague, completing his studies in 2003. He later obtained a master’s degree in marketing from the University of New York in Prague in 2006. From 2007 to 2009, he attended Harvard Business School, where he earned a Master of Business Administration.

== Career ==
In 2004, Afaedor began his professional career as a software engineer at Monster.com in Czech Republic. He later became senior product manager for European products, until 2007. In 2008, he joined Goldman Sachs in London, where he worked as an investment manager.

From 2009 to 2011, Afaedor worked at Notore Plc, a food and agricultural products company, where he was head of marketing and business development and later as head of sales for West, Central, and North Africa. In 2011, Afaedor co-founded QluQlu, a group-buying and e-commerce platform modeled on daily-deals websites.

== Ventures ==
=== Jumia Group ===
In 2012, Afaedor co-founded Jumia Group alongside Tunde Kehinde and Hendrik Harren. Jumia was formed following the merger of the Nigerian e-commerce platforms Kasuwa and Sabunta. Jumia expanded operations across multiple African countries, offering online retail, logistics, and digital payment services. In 2013, Jumia Nigeria became the first African company to win the prestigious "Best New Retail Launch" award at the World Retail Congress in Paris. He was CEO from 2012 to 2014. In 2014, Jumia won the best Online Retail Brand of the Year award at the BJAN Awards. The company later listed on the New York Stock Exchange in 2019.

=== Supermart.ng ===
In 2014, Afaedor co-founded Supermart.ng, an online grocery and consumer goods retailer based in Nigeria. He was CEO until 2019. During his tenure, Supermart.ng introduced Supermart Prime, a subscription-based delivery service in 2015.

=== Kyosk ===
In 2019, Afaedor co-founded Kyosk Digital Services, a Nairobi-based technology company focused on digitizing informal retail trade in Africa. Kyosk app connects retailers, farmers, and suppliers. In 2023, Kyosk Digital Services acquired KwikBasket, a Kenyan company operating in the distribution of agricultural products and services. Kyosk was ranked as the 2nd in the Financial Times Africa’s Fastest Growing Companies 2024 list and ranked 19th in 2025. He was CEO until 2025.

== Awards and recognition ==
- 1995: Received the West African Examinations Council (WAEC) Award for Academic Excellence.
- 2013: Named one of the Top 40 Under 40 by Business Day Nigeria.

== See also ==
- Jumia Group
