= France–Norway relations =

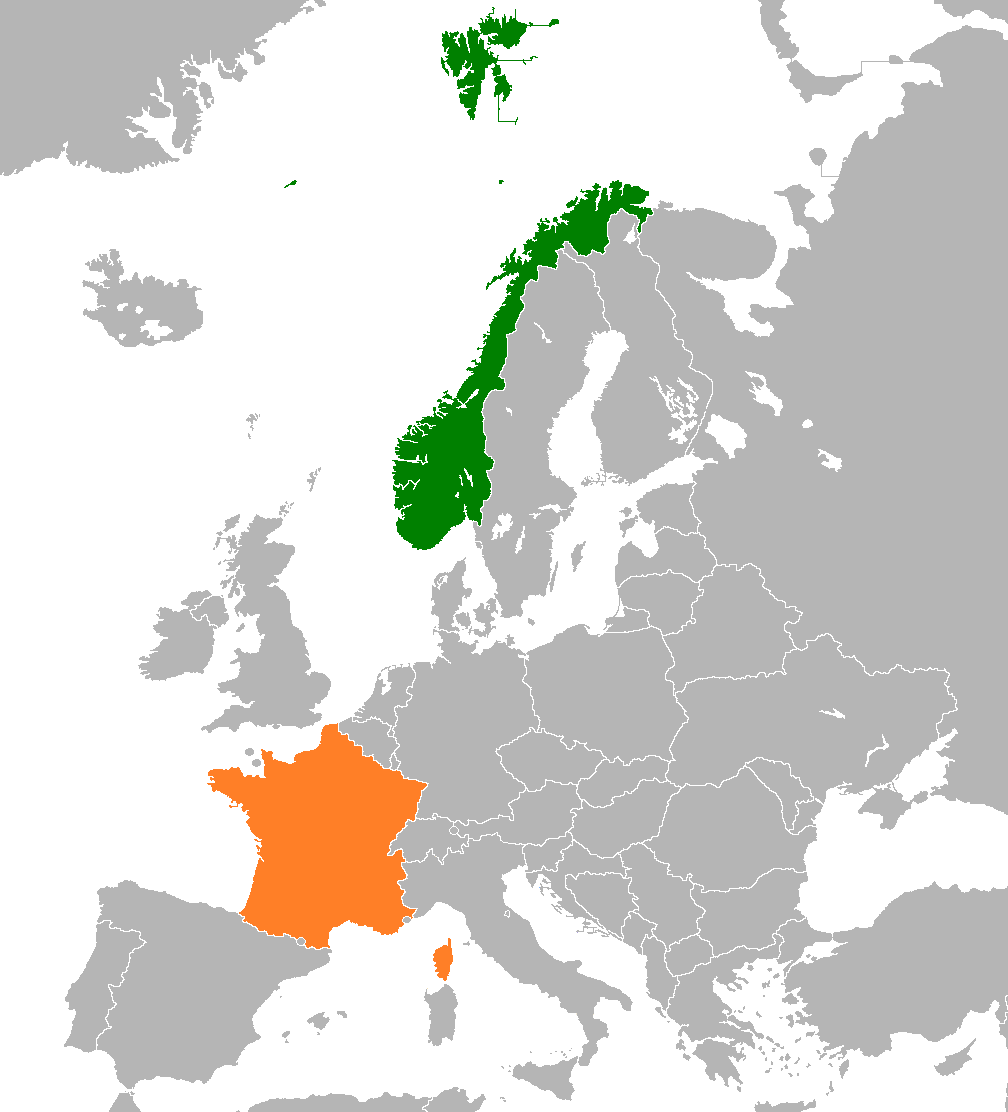
- Norway: France

France–Norway relations are foreign relations between France and Norway.

Both countries established diplomatic relations in 1905, after Norway's independence. Both countries are full members of NATO, and of the Council of Europe. There are around 2,000 Norwegian people living in France and around 3,571 French people living in Norway.

Both nations have Territorial claims in Antarctica, and mutually recognise each other's claims, as well as those from the United Kingdom, New Zealand and Australia.

There is also a Franco-Norwegian chamber of commerce.

== History ==
During World War II, both countries were invaded by Germany in 1940, and 504 Norwegians were imprisoned by the Germans in the Natzweiler-Struthof concentration camp in occupied France.

== Defense and nuclear cooperation ==
On 27 May 2026, France and Norway announced that Norway would open talks to join France's "forward nuclear deterrence" initiative, becoming the ninth European country to participate. The move reflects European concerns about long‑term U.S. security commitments and aims to strengthen Europe's strategic autonomy. Norway's primary deterrence will remain NATO and the United States, and no nuclear weapons will be deployed on Norwegian soil in peacetime.

== Education ==
There are two French international schools in Norway:

- Lycée Français René Cassin d'Oslo
- Lycée Français de Stavanger

== Resident diplomatic missions ==
- France has an embassy in Oslo.
- Norway has an embassy in Paris.
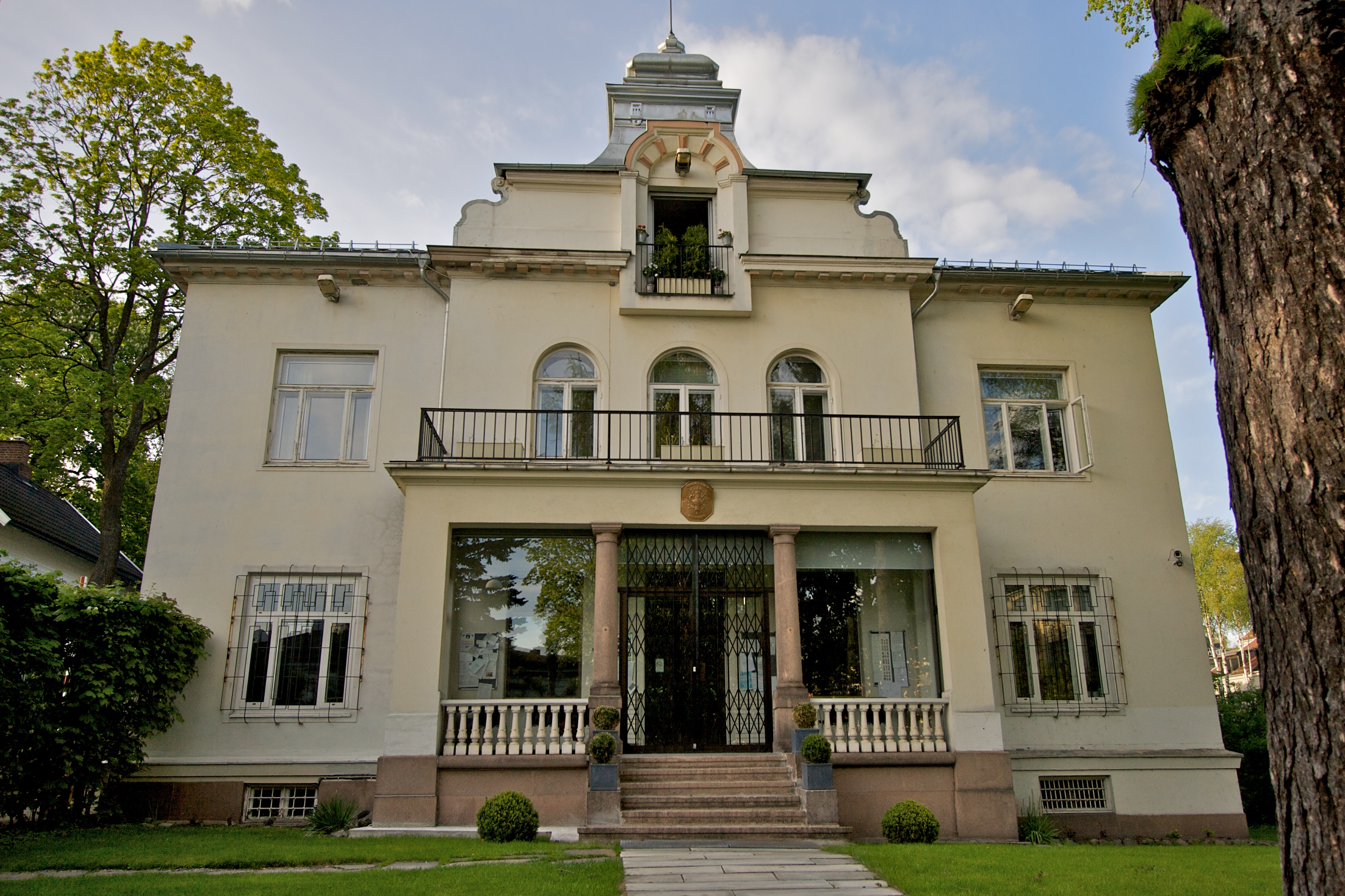
Embassy of France in Oslo

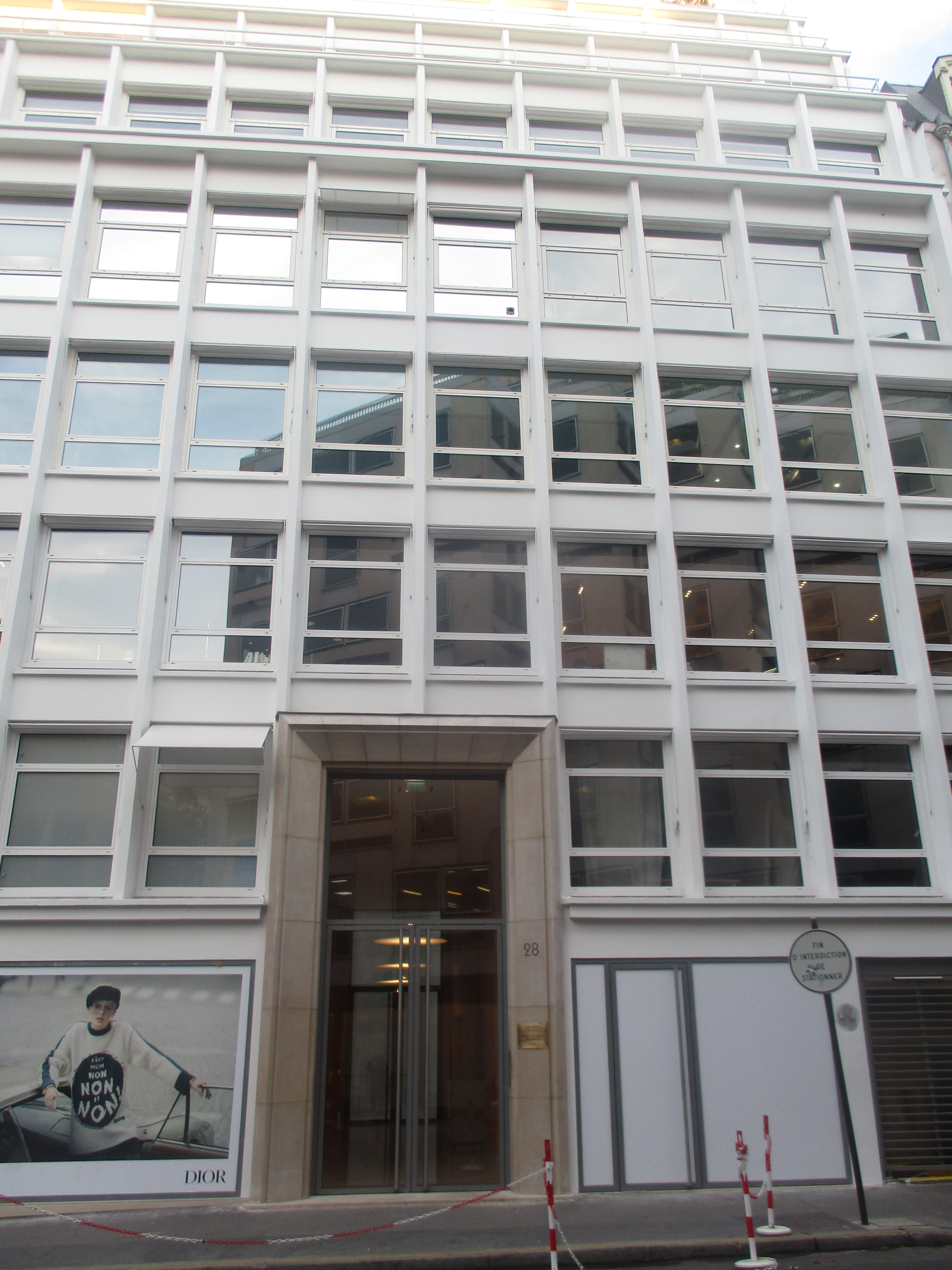
Building hosting the Embassy of Norway in Paris

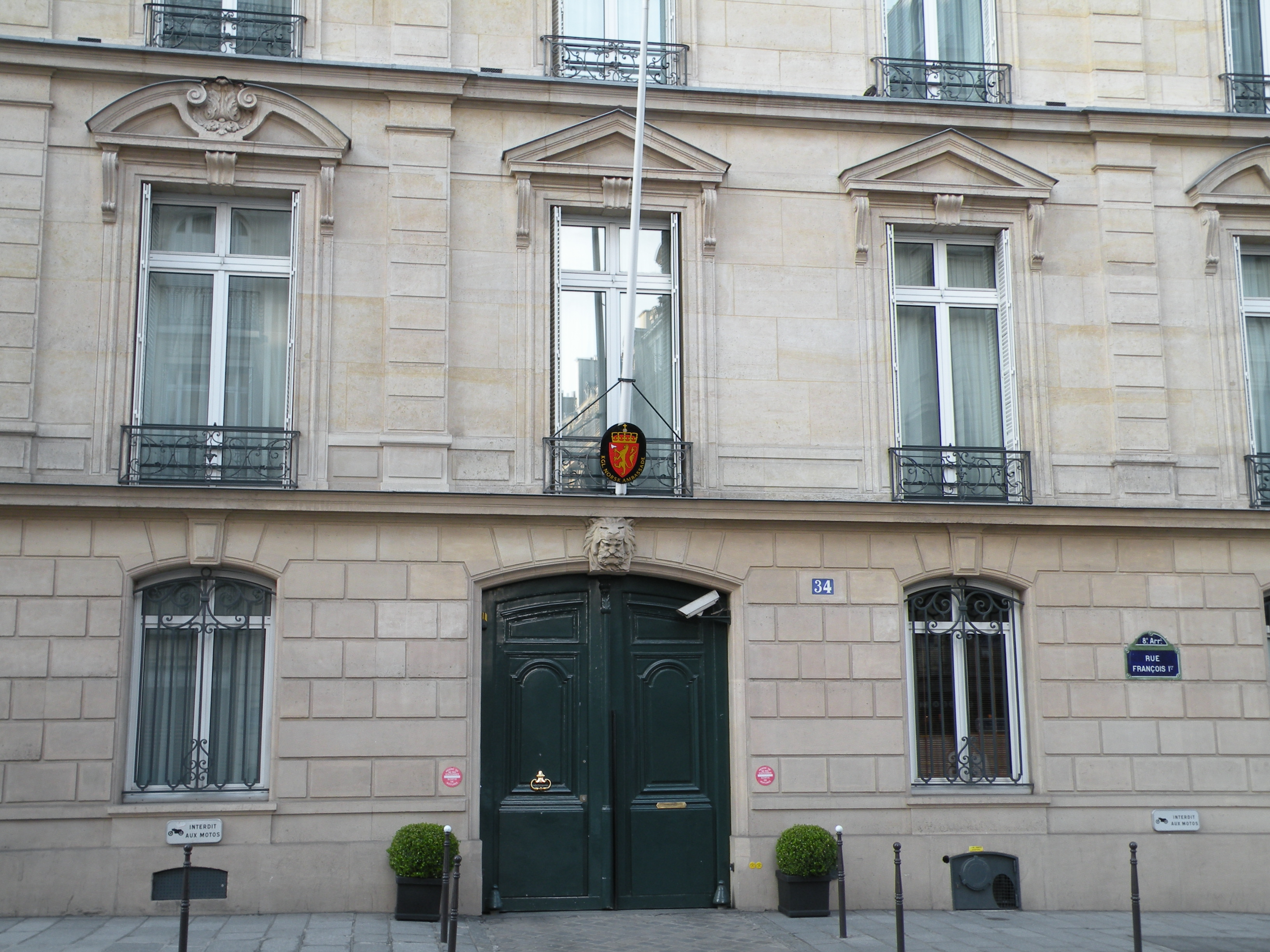
Residence of the Embassy of Norway in Paris

== See also ==
- Foreign relations of France
- Foreign relations of Norway
