= Travelstart =

South African travel booking website

- Website type: Private
- Available in: English
- Founded: 1999; 27 years ago
- Headquarters: Cape Town, South Africa
- Key people: Stephan Ekbergh (CEO)
- Industry: Travel
- Services: Travel booking
- Employees: 200+
- Website: travelstart.co.za

Travelstart is a South African travel booking website, offering flights, hotel bookings, car rental, holiday packages, and other travel services through an online booking engine.

The company operates in South Africa, Botswana, Kenya, Namibia, Nigeria, Tanzania and Zimbabwe.

Travelstart was founded in Sweden in 1999, by Stephan Ekbergh. Before launching Travelstart, Ekbergh founded Sweden's first online travel agency, Mr Jet, in 1995.

In 2010, Travelstart Nordic was sold to European Travel Interactive AB(eTRAVELi), and the former's headquarters moved to Cape Town.

In 2012, Travelstart Nigeria was launched, followed by Travelstart Egypt.

In December 2019, Travelstart acquired competitor Jumia Travel from Jumia. Under the purchase agreement, Travelstart took control of Jumia Travel's online book websites.
