= Lycée Français de Stavanger =

International school in Stavanger, Norway

Coordinates: 58.9722°N 5.7165°E

Lycée Français de Stavanger is a French international school in Stavanger, Norway. It was founded in 1972.

As of 2015 it served maternelle (preschool) through the second year of lycée (senior high school).

It was closed in 2019 due to lack of funding.

== See also ==
- France–Norway relations
- Lycée Français René Cassin d'Oslo
