= List of mathematician-politicians =

Historians of mathematics have noted the involvement of prominent mathematicians in politics at various times and places, notably in Italy during the period of unification at the end of the nineteenth century.

Those who become legislators attempt to use their mathematical skills to legitimise their political positions. However, some parliamentary colleagues tend to view them as failing to connect with the real world.

A maths columnist for Forbes suggested in 2018 that mathematicians in politics would contribute strengths including problem-solving, creativity, overcoming challenges, and collaboration.

John Derbyshire observed in 2003 that mathematicians have no dominant tendency; for example, Cauchy was a reactionary whereas Galois was a radical. He opines that the most influential research mathematicians do not give much thought to politics.

== Notable mathematician-politicians ==
This is a list of people who at some points in their lives achieved notability both as academically trained mathematicians (with a graduate degree, or published in mathematical journals) and as politicians (at a state or national level).

Image	Name	Country	Background	Politics
	Tadatoshi Akiba (1942–present)	Japan	University of Tokyo (BS, MS); Massachusetts Institute of Technology (PhD)	Japanese House of Representatives (1990–1999); Mayor of Hiroshima (1999–2011)
	Kazimierz Bartel (1882–1941)	Poland	Lviv Polytechnic	Prime Minister of Poland (1926, 1928–1929, 1929–1930)
	Muhammad Baydoun (1952–2022)	Lebanon	Lebanese University (BS); Claude Bernard University (PhD)	Minister of Housing & Cooperatives (1990–1992); Minister of Electrical & Water Resources (1992, 2000–2003)
	Václav Benda (1946–1999)	Czech Republic	Charles University (PhD)	Czech Senate (1996–1999)
	Alberto Beneduce (1877–1944)	Kingdom of Italy	University of Naples	Minister of Labor and Social Security (1921–1922)
	Enrico Betti (1823-1892)	Kingdom of Italy	University of Pisa (Laurea)	Parliament of the Kingdom of Italy (1862-1867); Undersecretary of State for Education (1874-1876); Senate of the Kingdom of Italy (1884-)
	Boris Berezovsky (1946–2013)	USSR; Russia	Moscow Forestry Engineering Institute; USSR Academy of Sciences	Deputy Secretary of the Security Council (1996–1997); Executive Secretary of the Commonwealth of Independent States (1998–1999); Member of the State Duma (1999–2000)
	Daniel Biss (1977–present)	United States	Harvard University (BA); Massachusetts Institute of Technology (MA, PhD)	Illinois House of Representatives (2011–2013); Illinois Senate (2013–2019); Mayor of Evanston (2021–present)
	Émile Borel (1871–1956)	France	École Normale Supérieure	Chamber of Deputies (1924–1936); Minister of the Navy (1925)
	Francesco Brioschi (1824–1897)	Italy	Collegio Borromeo	
	Rudranath Capildeo (1920–1970)	Trinidad & Tobago	University of London (BS, MS, PhD)	Member of Parliament (1961–1966, 1966–1967); Leader of the Opposition (1962–1967)
	Lazare Carnot (1753–1823)	France	École Royale du Génie de Mézières	Committee of Public Safety (1793–1794); President of the National Convention (1794); Director of the Directory (1795–1797); Minister of War (1800); Minister of Interior (1815)
	Ahmed Chalabi (1944–2015)	Iraq	Massachusetts Institute of Technology (BS); University of Chicago (PhD)	President of the Governing Council of Iraq (2003); Minister of Oil (2005–2006); Deputy Prime Minister (2005–2006)
	Marquis de Condorcet (1743–1794)	France	College of Navarre	Legislative Assembly (1791–1792); National Convention (1792–1793)
	Luigi Cremona (1830–1903)	Italy	University of Pavia	
	Nicușor Dan (1969–present)	Romania	University of Bucharest (BS); École Normale Supérieure (MS); Paris 13 University (PhD)	Chamber of Deputies (2016–2020); Mayor of Bucharest (2020–2025); President of Romania (2025–present)
	Ulisse Dini (1845–1918)	Italy	Scuola Normale Superiore	
	Charles Dupin (1784–1873)	France	Ecole Polytechnique	
	Sergio Fajardo (1956–present)	Colombia	University of the Andes (BS, MS); University of Wisconsin (PhD)	Mayor of Medellín (2004–2008); Governor of Antioquia (2012–2016)
	Ute Finckh-Krämer (1956–present)	Germany	University of Erlangen–Nuremberg (BS); University of Tübingen (MS, PhD)	Bundestag (2013–2017)
	Taj Haider (1942–2025)	Pakistan	Karachi University (BS, MS)	Senate (1995–2000)
	Daniel Hershkowitz (1953–present)	Israel	Technion – Israel Institute of Technology (BS, MS, DSc)	Knesset (2009–2013); Minister of Science & Technology (2009–2013)
	Reinhard Höppner (1948–2014)	East GermanyGermany	Technische Universität Dresden (Dr. rer. nat.)	Vice President of the Volkskammer (1990); Landtag of Saxony-Anhalt (1990–2006); Minister-President of Saxony-Anhalt (1994–2002)
	Eri Jabotinsky (1910–1969)	Israel	Hebrew University of Jerusalem (PhD)	Knesset (1949–1951)
	Hermine Agavni Kalustyan (1914–1989)	TurkeyArmenia	Istanbul University (PhD)	Turkish transitional parliament (1960–1961)
	Alexander Lubotzky (1956–present)	Israel	Bar-Ilan University (BA, PhD)	Knesset (1996–1999)
	Jerry McNerney (1951–present)	United States	University of New Mexico (BS, MS, PhD)	U.S. Representative - CA-11, 9 (2007–2023); California State Senate (2024–present)
	Michael Meister (1961–present)	Germany	Technical University of Darmstadt	Bundestag (1994–present)
	Luigi Federico Menabrea (1809–1896)	Italy	University of Turin	Prime Minister of Italy (1867–1869)
	Keith Mitchell (1946–present)	Grenada	University of the West Indies (BS); Howard University (MS); American University (PhD)	Member of Parliament (1984–present); Prime Minister of Grenada (1995–2008, 2013–2022); Leader of the Opposition (2008–2013, 2022–2025)
	Gaspard Monge (1746–1818)	France	Collège de la Trinité	Minister of the Navy (1792–1793)
	Mohammad-Ali Najafi (1952–present)	Iran	Sharif University of Technology (BS); Massachusetts Institute of Technology (MS, withdrew from PhD program)	Minister of Science (1981–1984, 2014); Minister of Education (1989–1997); Head of Management & Planning Organization (1997–2000); City Council of Tehran (2007–2013); Head of Cultural Heritage & Tourism Organization (2013–2014); Mayor of Tehran (2017–2018)
	Chike Obi (1921–2008)	Nigeria	University of London; Pembroke College, Cambridge; Massachusetts Institute of Technology (PhD)	Member of Parliament
	Paul Painlevé (1863–1933)	France	École Normale Supérieure; University of Göttingen (PhD)	Prime Minister of France (1917, 1925); Minister of War (1917, 1925); Minister of Finance (1925); President of the Chamber of Deputies (1924–1925); Minister of Air (1932–1933)
	Frederick Pollock (1783–1870)	United Kingdom	Trinity College, Cambridge	Member of Parliament (1831–1844); Attorney General (1834–1835, 1841–1844); Chief Baron of the Exchequer (1844–1866)
	Hugo Relander (1865–1947)	Finland		Minister of Finance (1924, 1925, 1928–1929, 1932–1936)
	Walter Romberg (1928–2014)	East Germany	University of Rostock; Humboldt University of Berlin (Dr. rer. nat.)	Minister of Finance (1990)
	George Saitoti (1945–2012)	Kenya	Brandeis University (BS); University of Sussex (MS); University of Warwick (PhD)	Member of Parliament (1988–2012); Vice President of Kenya (1989–2002); Minister of Finance (1988–1993); Minister of Education (2003–2008)
	Blagovest Sendov (1932–2020)	Bulgaria	Sofia University	Chairperson of the National Assembly of Bulgaria (1995–1997); Deputy Chairperson of the National Assembly (1997–2002); Ambassador to Japan (2004–2009)
	Frank Terpe (1929–2013)	East Germany	University of Greifswald (BS, PhD)	Minister of Research & Technology (1990)
	Faustin-Archange Touadéra (1957–present)	Central African Republic	University of Bangui (BS); University of Cocody (MS); University of Lille (PhD); University of Yaoundé I (PhD)	Prime Minister of the Central African Republic (2008–2013); President of the Central African Republic (2016–present)
	Cédric Villani (1973–present)	France	École Normale Supérieure; Paris Dauphine University (PhD)	National Assembly (2017–2022)
