= Lycée Français René Cassin d'Oslo =

International school in Oslo, Norway

Coordinates: 48.8481°N 2.3445°E

Lycée Français René Cassin d'Oslo (Norwegian: Den Franske skolen i Oslo) is a French international school in Oslo, Norway. The school serves the levels preschool through the final year of lycée, terminale (high school).

The school originated from the Vestheim School (Vestheim skole), founded by five people in 1891: Frederik Fredriksen, Nils Grøterud, Wilhelm Myhre, Hans H. K. Hougen, and Ole Jacobe Skattum.

In 2017 the Norwegian state gave NOK 4 million to the school because it lacked any funding to pay for new teachers and school supplies. In 2024 the school had 673 students from 37 countries.

== See also ==
- France–Norway relations
- Lycée Français de Stavanger
