= HotelOnline =

Kenyan traveltech company

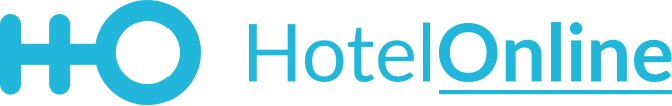
- Industry: travel technology
- Founded: 2014
- Founders: Endre Opdal, Håvar Bauck
- Headquarters: Nairobi
- Services: E-commerce, digital marketing, Software-as-a-Service (SaaS).
- Revenue: ▲NOK23 million (expected 2019)
- Number of employees: 42 (January 2017)
- Parent: Hotel Online Holding Pte. Ltd
- Website: https://www.hotelonline.co

HotelOnline is a travel technology company, offering a suite of digital tools for e-commerce, online marketing and operations automation to the hotel industry in Sub-Saharan Africa. The company helps hotels digitize operations and offers managed distribution to online channels, such as Online Travel Agents (OTAs), Global Distribution Systems, and metasearch engines.

== Background ==
HotelOnline was founded in 2014, by Endre Opdal and Håvar Bauck, to facilitate e-commerce and online marketing for hotels in Eastern Africa. Initially operating as Savanna Sunrise, the company grew rapidly in Kenya, Uganda and Rwanda in 2015 and 2016. After merging with a Polish competitor in 2017, the company rebranded to HotelOnline and expanded operations to Nigeria. Later in 2017, HotelOnline raised USD 250,000 in an equity crowdfunding, becoming the first known case of an African company successfully using this funding method.

In May 2018, HotelOnline acquired Senegalese travel technology company Teranga Solutions as part of their expansion into francophone Western Africa. The company at the same time also acquired European Travel Group AS.

In 2019, prominent startup investor Shravan Shroff invested an undisclosed amount in HotelOnline, and joined their Board of Directors. Shroff is known for his role as the first investor in traveltech unicorn OYO Rooms. Trond Riiber-Knudsen, known as Norway's most active startup investor, also co-invested an undisclosed amount.

In September 2019, as part of their expansion into the Nordic market, HotelOnline acquired the Norwegian operations of Key Butler, a leading Nordic short term apartment rental company.

In 2020, HotelOnline acquired former competitor Africabookings, and the Cloud9 Lifestyle app. This received some notable attention, as HotelOnline was seen as going against the stream when most of the travel industry in Africa was in a crisis.

In April 2022, Yanolja, a South Korean travel technology firm backed by Softbank and Booking.com announced their investment of an undisclosed amount in HotelOnline. Later, in September 2022, HotelOnline announced the USD 1.9 million acquisition of Kenyan competitor HotelPlus.

== Technology ==
HotelOnline provides a cloud-based suite of tools for automated online distribution and hotel operations, reservations management and AI-driven dynamic pricing.
