= Cédric Villani =

French mathematician and politician (born 1973)

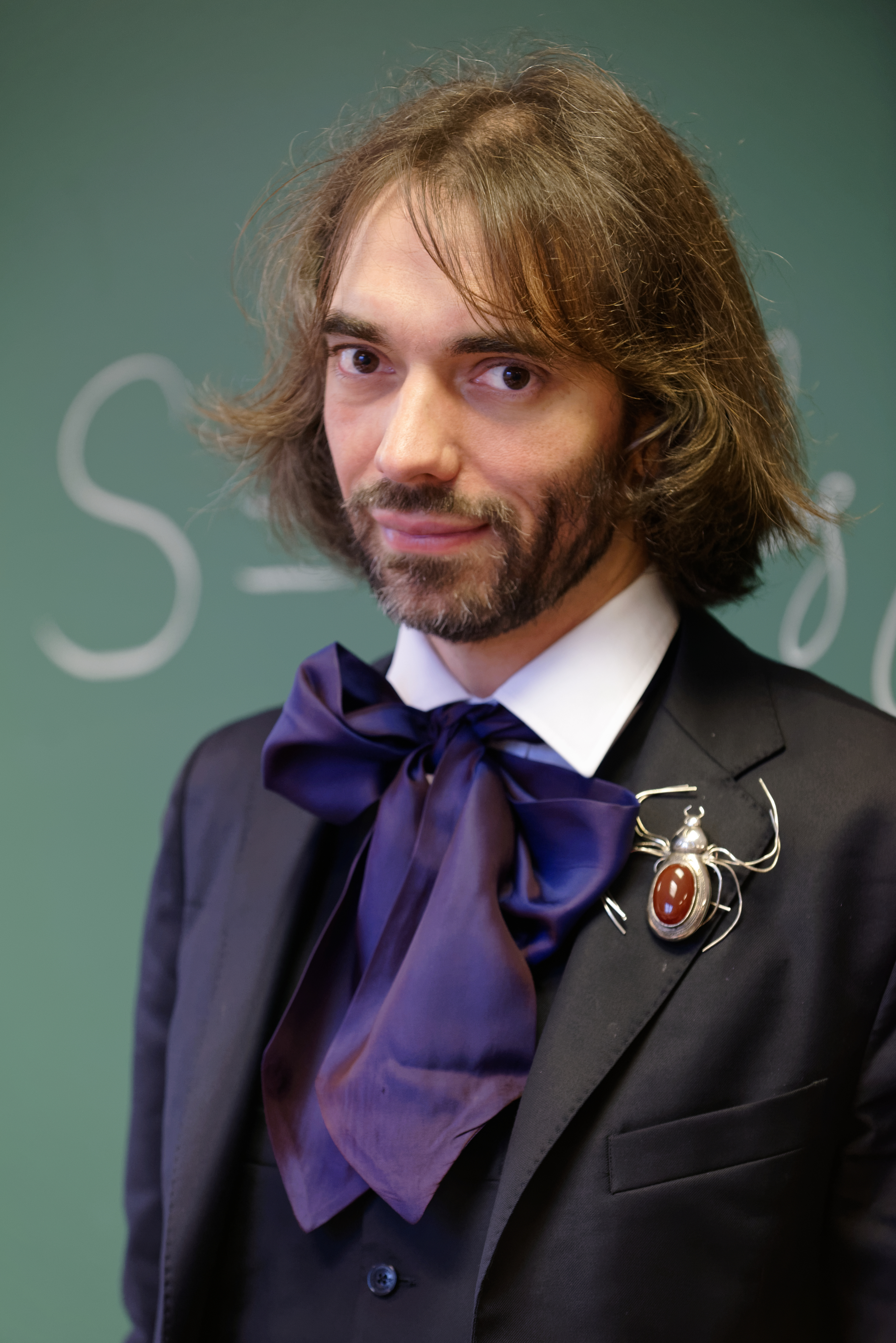
- Villani in 2015

Member of the National Assembly for Essonne's 5th constituency
- In office 21 June 2017 – 21 June 2022
- Preceded by: Maud Olivier
- Succeeded by: Paul Midy

Personal details
- Born: 5 October 1973 (age 53) Brive-la-Gaillarde, France
- Party: Ecology Generation (2020–present)
- Other political affiliations: Ecology Democracy Solidarity (2020); LREM (2017–2020)

Cédric Patrice Thierry Villani (French: [sedʁik patʁis tjeʁi vilani]; born 5 October 1973) is a French mathematician and politician working primarily on partial differential equations, Riemannian geometry and mathematical physics. He was awarded the Fields Medal in 2010, and he was the director of Sorbonne University's Institut Henri Poincaré from 2009 to 2017. As of September 2025, he is a professor at the École normale supérieure de Rennes.

Villani has given two lectures at the Royal Institution, the first titled 'Birth of a Theorem'. The English translation of his book Théorème vivant (Living Theorem) has the same title. In the book he describes the links between his research on kinetic theory and that of the mathematician Carlo Cercignani. Villani, in fact, proved the so-called Cercignani's conjecture. His second lecture at the Royal Institution is titled 'The Extraordinary Theorems of John Nash'.

Villani was elected as the deputy for Essonne's 5th constituency in the National Assembly, the lower house of the French Parliament, during the 2017 legislative election. He was elected as a member of La République En Marche! (LREM), but in May 2020 left the party to form a new party, Ecology, Democracy, Solidarity (EDS). Following the dissolution of EDS, Villani joined Ecology Generation, and ran for re-election in 2022 under the banner of the NUPES, ultimately losing his seat to LREM candidate Paul Midy by 19 votes.

He was elected vice president of the French Parliamentary Office for the Evaluation of Scientific and Technological Choices in July 2017.

== Biography ==
After attending the Lycée Louis-le-Grand, Villani was admitted at the École Normale Supérieure in Paris and studied there from 1992 to 1996, after which he was appointed an agrégé préparateur at the same school. He received his doctorate at Paris Dauphine University in 1998, under the supervision of Pierre-Louis Lions, and became professor at the École normale supérieure de Lyon in 2000. He is now professor at the University of Lyon. He was director of the Institut Henri Poincaré in Paris from 2009 to 2017.

He has held various visiting positions at Georgia Tech (Fall 1999), the University of California, Berkeley (Spring 2004), and the Institute for Advanced Study, Princeton (Spring 2009).

== Mathematical work ==
Villani has worked on the theory of partial differential equations involved in statistical mechanics, specifically the Boltzmann equation, where, with Laurent Desvillettes, he was the first to prove how quickly convergence occurs for initial values not near equilibrium. He has written with Giuseppe Toscani on this subject. With Clément Mouhot, he has worked on nonlinear Landau damping. He has worked on the theory of optimal transport and its applications to differential geometry, and with John Lott has defined a notion of bounded Ricci curvature for general measured length spaces. He also served on the Mathematical Sciences jury for the Infosys Prize in 2015 and 2016.

Villani received the Fields Medal for his work on Landau damping and the Boltzmann equation. He described the development of his theorem in his autobiographical book Théorème vivant (2012), published in English translation as Birth of a Theorem: A Mathematical Adventure (2015). He gave a TED talk at the 2016 conference in Vancouver.

== Political career ==
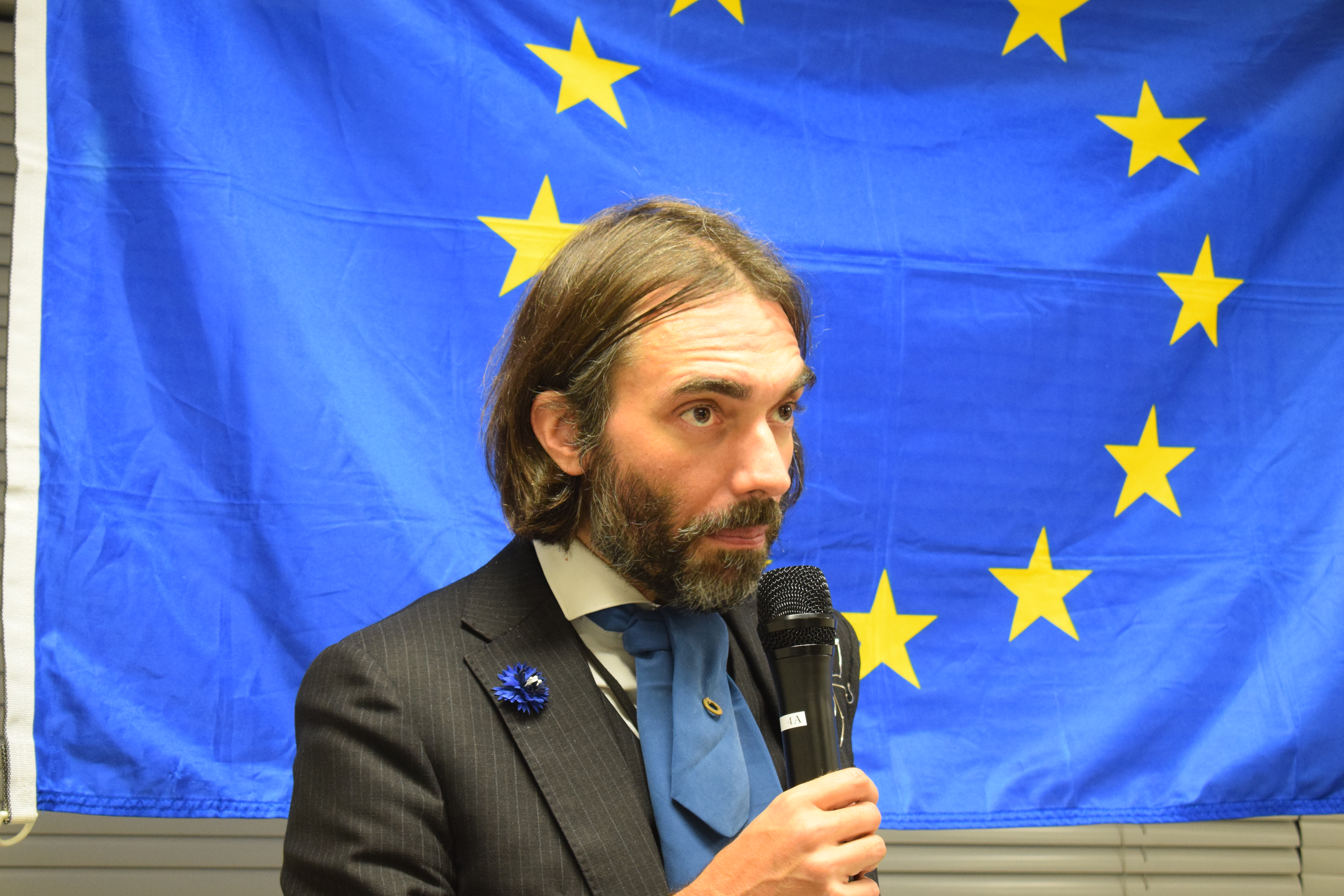
Cédric Villani at a public meeting of En Marche in Tokyo

In 2017, it was announced that Villani had been selected as a candidate for En Marche! (LREM) in the 2017 French legislative election, for Essonne's 5th constituency. In the first round of voting, Villani obtained 47% of the vote and was thus strongly placed for the second round which he won with 69.36% of the vote.

In 2019, Villani applied to be selected to lead the LREM candidate slate for the 2020 Paris election. By July 2019, he was one of three LREM candidates, all deputies in the National Assembly, still seeking the position; the other two were Benjamin Griveaux (who had been the government spokesperson) and Hugues Renson (who had been the vice-president of the National Assembly). On 10 July, the nomination committee picked Griveaux. On 4 September, Villani officially announced his candidacy for the municipal election.

== Other activities ==
- France China Foundation, former Member of the Strategic Committee

In 2018, the French economics magazine Challenges said that Villani has been approached by Europanova thinktank. He presided over the jury of Digital In-Pulse, a startup program dedicated to accompanying entrepreneurs and start-ups, managed by Chinese corporate Huawei. The magazine also says that Villani is still the President of the endowment funds of the French Henri Poincaré Institute, and Huawei is among the top private donors. Villani declined the journalist's request for comment, and the article indicates that the French counter-intelligence service presented him as "too naïve" regarding those opportunities.

== Awards and honours ==
=== Diplomas, titles and awards ===
- 1998: PhD Thesis (advisor P.-L. Lions)
- 2000: Habilitation dissertation
- 2001: Louis Armand Prize of the Academy of Sciences
- 2003: Peccot-Vimont Prize and Cours Peccot of the Collège de France
- 2003: Plenary lecturer at the International Congress of Mathematical Physics (Lisbonne)
- 2004: Harold Grad lecturer
- 2004: Visiting Miller Professor, University of California Berkeley.
- 2006: Institut Universitaire de France
- 2006: Invited lecturer at the International Congress of Mathematicians (Madrid)
- 2007: Grand Prix Jacques Herbrand (French Academy of Sciences)
- 2008: Prize of the European Mathematical Society
- 2009: Henri Poincaré Prize
- 2009: Fermat Prize
- 2010: Fields Medal
- 2013: Gibbs lecturer: On Disorder, Mixing and Equilibration
- 2014: Joseph L. Doob Prize by the American Mathematical Society for his book Optimal Transport: Old and New (Springer Verlag 2009)

=== Extra-academic distinctions ===
- 2009: Knight of the National Order of Merit (France)
- 2011: Knight of the Legion of Honor
- 2013: Member of the French Academy of Sciences
- 2016: Ordinary member of the Pontifical Academy of Sciences
- 2022: Fellow of the International Science Council

In 2020, a supposed new spider species of the family Araneidae, Araniella villanii, was named after him. However, this species was later shown to be a junior synonym of Araniella tbilisiensis.

== Selected writings ==
- Villani, Cédric (2002) [June 2001]. "Limites hydrodynamiques de l'équation de Boltzmann". Astérisque. 282. Séminaire Bourbaki: 365–405. ISSN 0303-1179.
- — (2002). "A Review of Mathematical Topics in Collisional Kinetic Theory". In Friedlander, S.; Serre, D. (eds.). Handbook of Mathematical Fluid Dynamics. Vol. 1. Elsevier. doi:10.1016/S1874-5792(02)80004-0. ISBN 978-0-444-50330-5.
- — (25 March 2003). Topics in Optimal Transportation. Vol. 58. Providence, Rhode Island: American Mathematical Society. doi:10.1090/gsm/058. ISBN 978-0-8218-3312-4. MR 1964483.
- Optimal transportation, dissipative PDE's and functional inequalities, pp. 53–89 in Optimal Transportation and Applications, edited by L. A. Caffarelli and S. Salsa, volume 1813 of Lecture Notes in Mathematics, Springer, 2003, ISBN 978-3-540-40192-6.
- — (1 March 2003). "Cercignani's Conjecture is Sometimes True and Always Almost True". Communications in Mathematical Physics. 234 (3): 455–490. Bibcode:2003CMaPh.234..455V. doi:10.1007/s00220-002-0777-1. ISSN 1432-0916.
- Desvillettes, L.; — (1 February 2005). "On the trend to global equilibrium for spatially inhomogeneous kinetic systems: The Boltzmann equation". Inventiones Mathematicae. 159 (2): 245–316. doi:10.1007/s00222-004-0389-9. ISSN 1432-1297.
- — (July–August 2006). "Mathematics of Granular Materials". Journal of Statistical Physics. 124 (2–4): 781–822. Bibcode:2006JSP...124..781V. doi:10.1007/s10955-006-9038-6. ISSN 1572-9613.
- Optimal transport, old and new, volume 338 of Grundlehren der mathematischen Wissenschaften, Springer, 2009, ISBN 978-3-540-71049-3.
- —, Lott, John (2009). "Ricci curvature for metric-measure spaces via optimal transport". Annals of Mathematics. 169 (3): 903–991. arXiv:math/0412127. doi:10.4007/annals.2009.169.903. ISSN 0003-486X. JSTOR 25662148. MR 2480619. Zbl 1178.53038.
- Hypocoercivity, volume 202, No. 950 of Memoirs of the American Mathematical Society, 2009, ISBN 978-0-8218-4498-4.
- Clément Mouhot; — (2009). "On Landau damping". Acta Mathematica. 207: 29–201. arXiv:0904.2760. doi:10.1007/s11511-011-0068-9. ISSN 0001-5962. MR 2863910. S2CID 115179279. Zbl 1239.82017.
- Théorème vivant, Bernard Grasset, Paris 2012
- Les Coulisses de la création, Flammarion, Paris 2015 (with composer and pianist Karol Beffa)
- Freedom in Mathematics, Springer India, 2016 (with Pierre Cartier, Jean Dhombres, Gerhard Heinzmann), ISBN 978-81-322-2786-1. Translation from the French language edition: Mathématiques en liberté, La Ville Brûle, Montreuil 2012, ISBN 978-23-601-2026-0.
- Birth of a Theorem, Farrar, Straus and Giroux, New York 2015; translated by Malcolm DeBevoise.
- De mémoire vive, Une histoire de l'aventure numérique, Philippe Dewost, préface de Cédric Villani, Éditions Première Partie, 2022, ISBN 978-2-36526-252-1.
- Leçons de mathématique joyeuse, Éditions Le Cherche midi, 2025, (413 p.), ISBN 978-2-7491-8409-8
