= Cercignani conjecture =

Cercignani's conjecture was proposed in 1982 by an Italian mathematician and kinetic theorist for the Boltzmann equation. It assumes a linear inequality between the entropy and entropy production functionals for Boltzmann's nonlinear integral operator, describing the statistical distribution of particles in a gas. Cercignani conjectured that the rate of convergence to the entropical equilibrium for solutions of the Boltzmann equation is time-exponential, i.e. the entropy difference between the current state and the equilibrium state decreases exponentially fast as time progresses. Fields medalist Cédric Villani proved that the conjecture "is sometimes true and always almost true"

Mathematically:

Let $f(t,x,v)$ be the distribution function of particles at time $t$, position $x$ and velocity $v$, and $f_\infty(v)$ the equilibrium distribution (typically the Maxwell-Boltzmann distribution), then our conjecture is:

$H(f(t))-H(f_\infty)\le{C_e}^{-{\lambda}t}$,

where $H(f)$ is the entropy of distribution $f$, $C$ and $\lambda$ are constants >0 and $\lambda$ is related to the convergence rate.

Thus the conjecture provides us with insight into how quickly a gas approaches its thermodynamic equilibrium.

In 2024, the result was extended from the Botzmann to the Boltzmann-Fermi-Dirac equation.
