= Claire-Lise Campion =

French politician (born 1951)

Claire-Lise Campion (born 27 July 1951) is a former member of the Senate of France. She represented the Essonne department from 2000 to 2017, and is a member of the Socialist Party.

== Bibliography ==
- Page on the Senate website (in French)
