= Stéphane Pocrain =

French politician and journalist

- Born: 27 November 1972 (age 53); Paris, France
- Occupation: Television journalist

Stéphane Pocrain (born 27 November 1972) is a French politician and television journalist.

He was born in Paris on 27 November 1972. His parents came from Guadeloupe.

He was a candidate for an ecologist movement in 2002's elections in Orsay.

He created, in 2005, the CRAN (Conseil Représentatif des Associations Noires de France) with Manu Dibango, Louis-Georges Tin, and Fodé Sylla.
