= Laure Darcos =

French politician (born 1970)

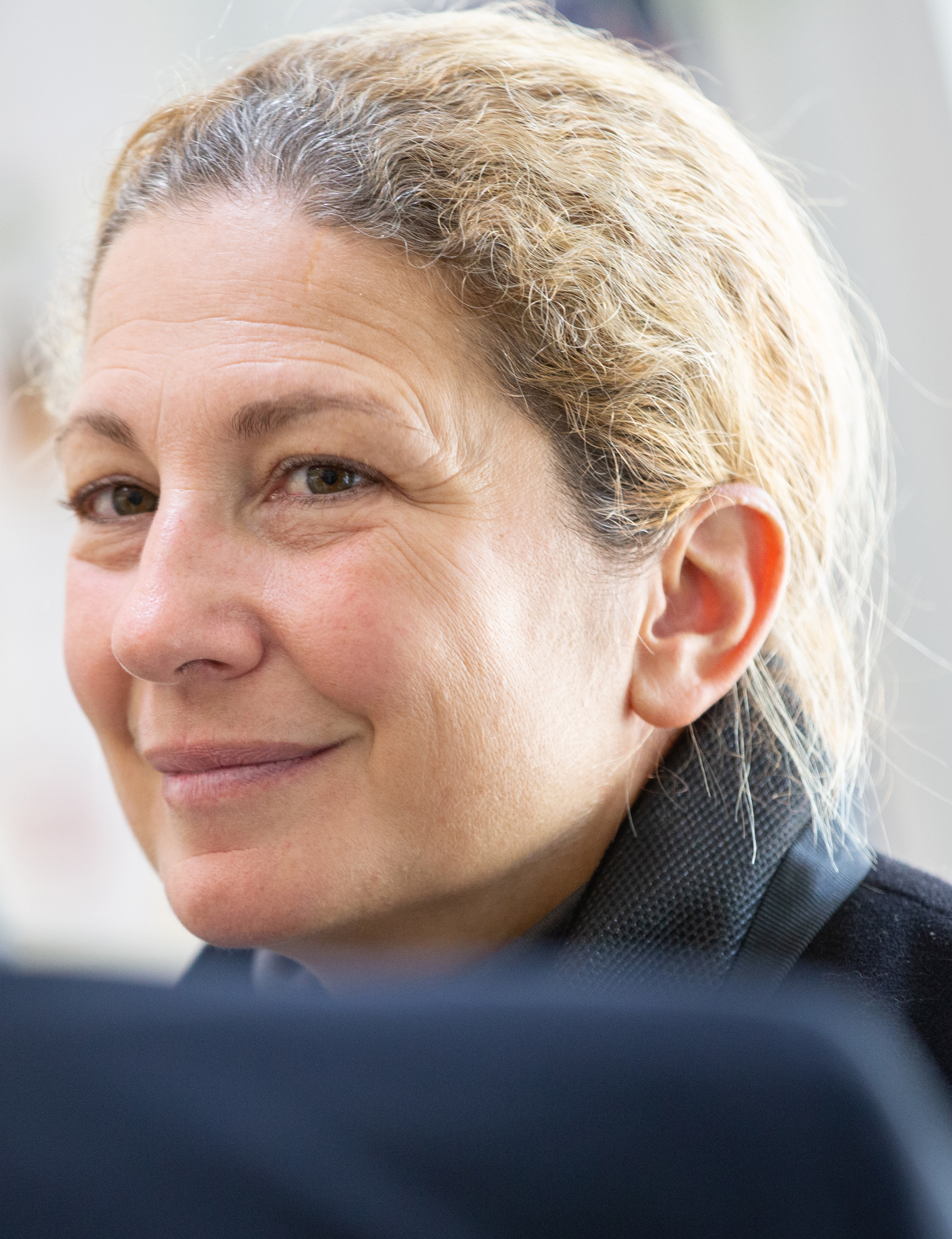
- Laure Darcos in 2019

Member of the French Senate for Essonne
- Incumbent
- Assumed office 1 October 2017

Personal details
- Born: Laure Driant; 27 November 1970 (age 55) Neuilly-sur-Seine, France
- Party: The Republicans; Soyons Libres (since 2018)
- Spouse: Xavier Darcos (m. 1999)
- Children: 1
- Education: Paris-Sorbonne University

Laure Darcos (born Laure Driant 27 November 1970 in Neuilly-sur-Seine) is a French politician of Soyons Libres (SL) who has been a member of the Senate since the 2017 elections, representing Essonne.

== Early life and education ==
Darcos is the great-granddaughter of Colonel Émile Driant and also a descendant of Georges Ernest Boulanger.

Darcos obtained a degree in history from Paris-Sorbonne University (1993), before taking classes at the École du Louvre from 2005 to 2007. She is a graduate of IFA / Sciences Po Paris, where she obtained a certificate (2015).

== Early career ==
In 1990, Darcos began her career as a trainee in the Le Quotidien de Paris, then in two political communication agencies (Modus Vivendi and P.O.L.I.S.).

In 1994, Darcos became the parliamentary assistant of Pierre Lequiller. From 1995 to 1997, she worked in the cabinet of Minister of National Education, Higher Education and Research François Bayrou. From 1997 to 1998, she was then in charge of the mission of the director of the book and reading, Jean-Sebastien Dupuit, before becoming parliamentary attaché of Xavier Darcos, senator of the Dordogne from 1998 to 2002. She served as assistant chief of staff to Xavier Darcos when he was Minister of National Education.

== Career in the private sector ==
Darcos then returned to the corporate world, as director of institutional relations for the Hachette Livre group from 2009 to 2016 and as member of the Hachette Group's France Executive Committee from 2013. She also served as vice-president of the Digital Commission of the National Union of Publishing.

== Political career ==
In the 2015 departmental elections, Darcos was elected county councilor of Essonne (canton of Gif-sur-Yvette), then member of the permanent commission of the departmental council of Essonne.

In the 2017 parliamentary elections Darcos ran for Essonne's 5th constituency but eventually lost against the mathematician Cédric Villani, the candidate of La République En Marche! (LREM).

Darcos was elected Senator of Essonne during the senatorial elections of 2017, on September 24, 2017. In the Senate, she is a member of the Committee on Culture, Education and Communication.

In February 2018, Darcos joined the Soyons Libres, a movement led by Valérie Pécresse.

== Other activities ==
- Le Siècle, Member

== Awards ==
- Chevalier dans l'ordre des Palmes académiques (2006)
- Chevalier dans l'ordre des Arts et des Lettres (2012)
