= Laurent Béteille =

French politician

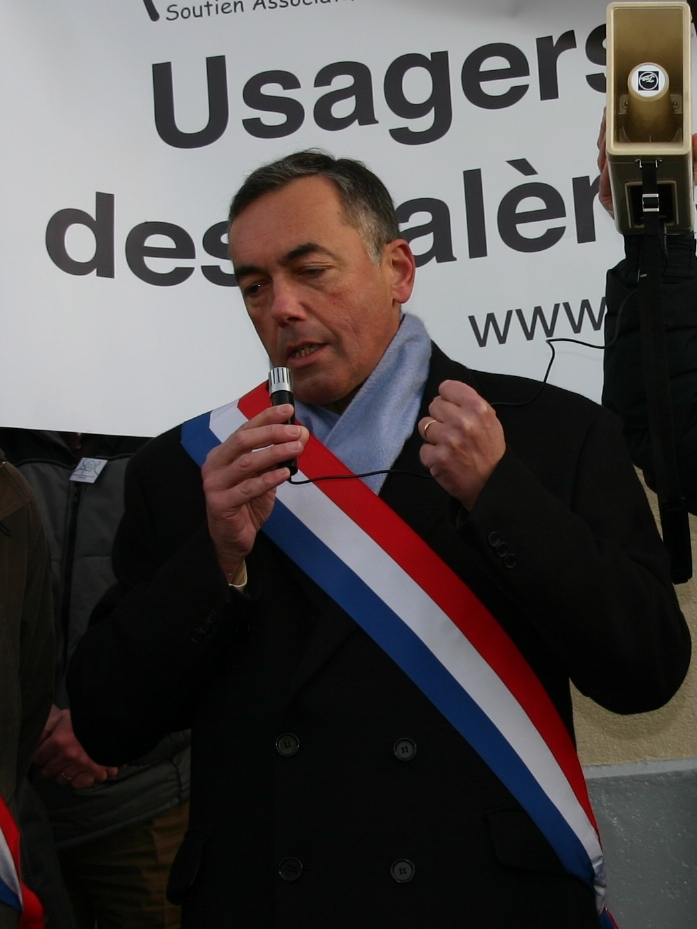
Béteille in 2008

Laurent Béteille (born 19 April 1948 in Nîmes) is a former member of the Senate of France, who represented the Essonne department. He is a member of the Union for a Popular Movement.

== Biography ==
Laurent Élie Georges Béteille was born on April 19, 1948, in Nîmes, to Colette Béteille, née Bernard, and Raoul Béteille. He is the father of two children.

Laurent Béteille is a Lawyer by profession.

Laurent Béteille was a general councilor for the canton of Brunoy from 1985 to 2001 and a senator for Essonne from 2001 to 2011.

He has been mayor of Brunoy since 1977 and vice-president of the Val d'Yerres urban community since 2002. On May 18, 2012, he announced that he was running for legislative office in the 8th district of Essonne. In December 2012, he announced that he would be handing over the reins to his first deputy for finance, Bruno Gallier.

== Bibliography ==
- Page on the Senate website (in French)
