= Jumia =

African e-commerce company

Jumia Technologies AG
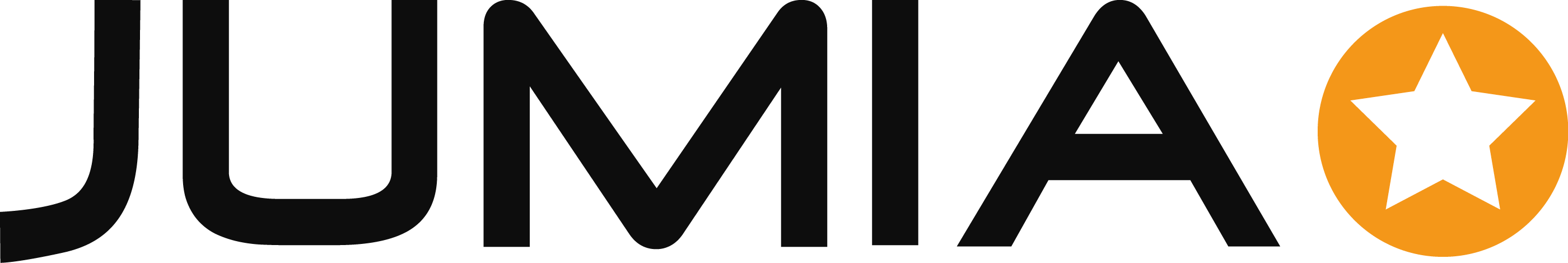
- Type: Public
- Traded as: NYSE: JMIA
- Industry: E-commerce, Internet, Retail, Marketplace, Payment, Logistics
- Founded: 2012; 14 years ago Lagos, Nigeria.
- Founders: Jérémy Hodara, Sacha Poignonnec, Tunde Kehinde, Raphael Kofi Afaedor
- Key people: Francis Dufay (CEO); Antoine Maillet-Mezeray (Executive VP, Finance & Operations)
- Number of employees: 3,000
- Website: group.jumia.com

Jumia is a marketplace, logistics service and payment service, operating throughout Africa. The logistics service enables the delivery of packages through local partners while the payment services facilitate the payments of online transactions. It has partnered with more than 100,000 sellers and individuals. It is Africa's largest online marketplace, receiving 20 to 25 million monthly visitors as of 2025.

== History ==
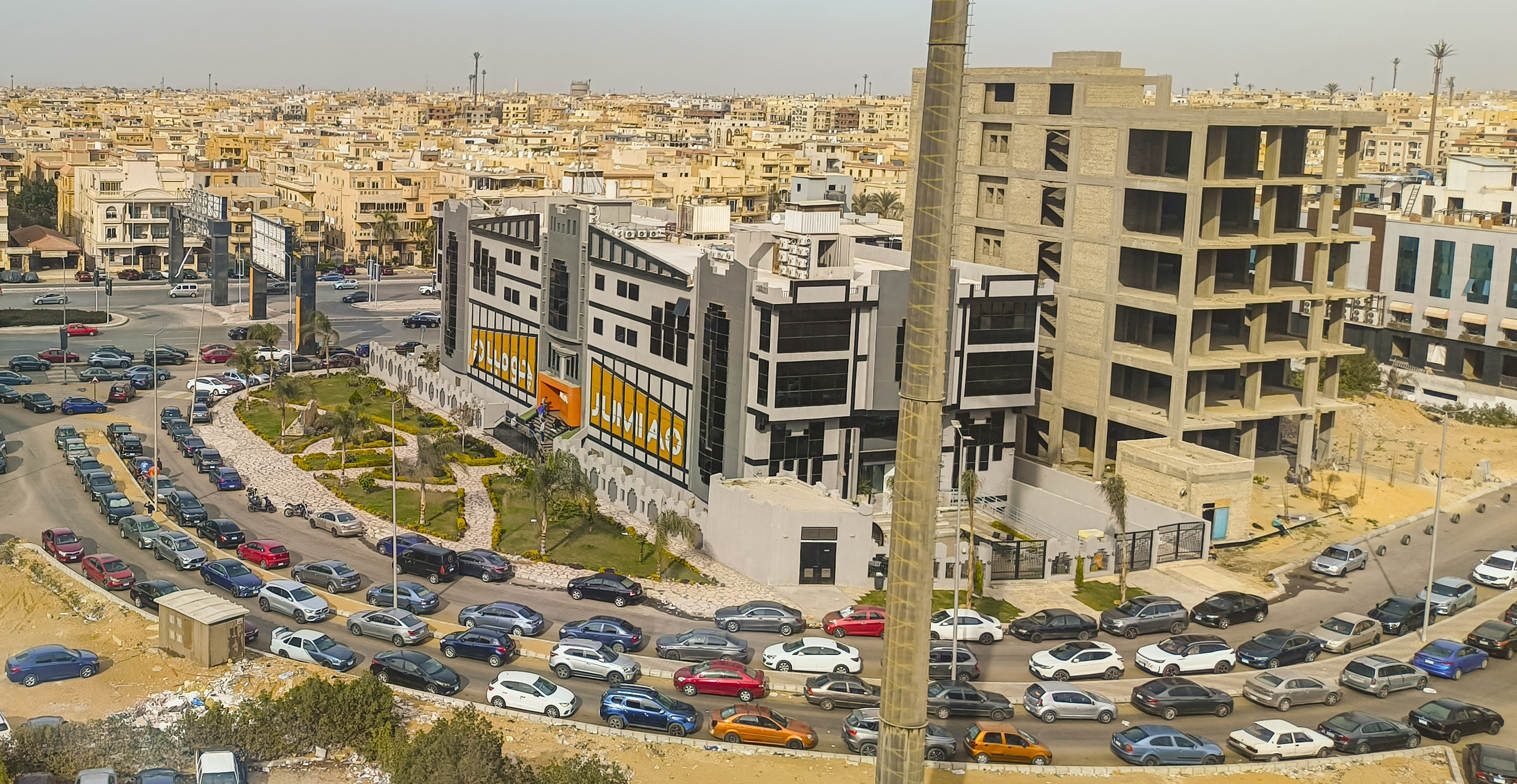
Jumia Egypt HQ

In 2012, Jeremy Hodara and Sacha Poignonnec, ex-McKinsey consultants, founded Jumia along with Tunde Kehinde and Raphael Kofi Afaedor.

Jumia was launched in Nigeria in 2012 and expanded to five other countries: Egypt, Morocco, Ivory Coast, Kenya and South Africa. In 2014, the company launched offices in Tunisia, Tanzania, Ghana, Cameroon, Algeria and Uganda, and by 2018 it was present in 14 African countries. In Egypt, Jumia has been trying to categorize itself as one of the leading e-commerce websites.

In June 2013, Jumia launched Jumia Travel, a hotel booking platform, and Jumia Food, a food delivery platform. Jumia Deals was launched in April 2015. In 2017, Jumia launched Jumia One, an app that enables customers to pay bills. The same year, Jumia launched JumiaPay, a secure payment system. This was followed by the Jumia lending program.

In South Africa, Jumia operates under the brand name Zando, focusing only on online fashion retail.

At the end of 2015, the founders of Jumia appointed Juliet Anammah as the CEO of Jumia Nigeria so that they could concentrate on global control of the company. Massimiliano Spalazzi took over from Anammah as CEO in Nigeria in January 2020 and Anammah was appointed chairwoman of Jumia Nigeria and the Head of Institutional Affairs, Africa.

In 2015, Jumia generated $234 million in revenue, a 265% growth from 2014. In 2016, Jumia became the continent's first unicorn being valued at over 1 billion USD.

In late November 2018, Jumia partnered with cryptocurrency company Telcoin to enhance payment service capabilities throughout their areas of operation. The same month, Jumia and Carrefour signed a partnership to sell online products in Africa.

In April 2019, Jumia went public on the New York Stock Exchange (NYSE) and raised $196 million in net proceeds. The share price, initially offered at $14.50, rose more than 200% in the first three trading sessions. However, after reaching a peak of nearly $50 on 1 May 2019, the share value declined to under $5/share by year's end.

In November 2019, Jumia announced the suspension of its e-commerce operations in Cameroon. Jumia later ceased operations in Tanzania effective 27 November 2019. The company said it needed to focus its resources on other markets and the decision would help it achieve greater success in the future. On 9 December 2019, Jumia suspended Jumia Food in Rwanda. Jumia, however, vowed to continue doing business online in those countries on the classifieds portals, previously called Jumia Deals.

On 9 December 2019, Travelstart entered into a distribution and commercial agreement with Jumia Travel, Jumia's hotel booking platform, to power the latter's pan-African online travel booking portal. Under the agreement, Travelstart took control of the sales, fulfilment and customer service aspects of Jumia Travel online booking websites in all its operating territories.

In 2020, Jumia's total sales value of Fast-Moving Consumer Goods grew by 13 percentage points, from 44% in 2019, according to the Jumia Africa E-commerce Index 2021. In 2020, Jumia ranked 7th among the top 10 influential brands in Egypt. In 2021, Jumia launched its technology centre in Egypt to provide its services to the Egyptian market as well as Africa at large.

COVID-19 accelerated the growth of e-commerce and digital entrepreneurship in Africa and more women embraced digital business. On the Jumia platform, over a third of businesses in Côte d'Ivoire and over half in Kenya and Nigeria are owned by women according to IFC.

In November 2022, Jumia announced leadership changes after positing significant financial losses, with the appointment of a new management board and acting CEO, while Jeremy Hodara and Sacha Poignonnec, co-CEOs, resigned from their roles. The supervisory board appointed Francis Dufay as aActing CEO and elevated Antoine Maillet-Mezeray to executive vice president finance & operations. In February 2023, the supervisory board appointed Dufay as CEO after spending three months as acting CEO. The said it was focused on making "radical changes" around better cost management.

In December 2023, Jumia announced plans to discontinue food delivery across seven markets, shifts focus to expanding physical goods business. In October 2024, Jumia made the strategic decision to exit South Africa and Tunisia, choosing to focus on Nigeria and other key markets. This move was likely driven by the company's desire to consolidate its resources and strengthen its position in its home market, Nigeria. In February 2026, Jumia exited the Algerian market, a country that had made up around 2% of its gross merchandise value(GMV).

== Partnerships ==
On 16 March 2020, Jumia announced a major partnership with Reckitt Benckiser, a health products manufacturer, to provide hygiene products during the pandemic. In May 2020, The United Nations Development Programme (UNDP) in partnership with Jumia Uganda, launched an online platform to enable small and medium enterprises to connect with consumers to sustain livelihoods in view of restrictions on movement, stay at home measures and social distancing guidelines. In September 2020, the Moroccan Ministry of handicrafts teamed up with Jumia to help artisans sell their products online and alleviate the impact of the pandemic.

In December 2020, Jumia announced a partnership with Egypt Post to boost and develop e-commerce trade flows and industry in Egypt. In December 2021, UNICEF and Jumia partnered to help Giga connect schools in Africa to the Internet. In February 2022, Jumia announced a partnership with LocQar, a smart locker company, to bring online deliveries closer to its consumers in Ghana.

In September 2022, a partnership was announced with Zipline for deliveries dropped from their robotic aircraft. In addition, a partnership with Coca Cola was announced to provide online shopping to consumers in Africa. In 2023, Jumia announced a partnership to sell French retailer Leroy Merlin's products in West Africa, part of a plan to expand its reach.

In October 2023, Jumia signed a partnership with Starlink to retail the Starlink Residential Kit in Africa, starting with Nigeria before the end of 2023 and then Kenya and later to others countries.

== Logistics ==
Jumia has a logistics network, which includes among its physical locations warehouses, drop-off stations and pick-up stations. In 2020, Jumia announced that its logistics service was available for use by third parties for last-mile deliveries across 11 countries in Africa.

In November 2022, Jumia announced that it would be scaling back its logistics and would only be available in three countries (Nigeria, Ivory Coast and Morocco). Jumia Prime was also suspended.

In May 2024, Jumia launched an integrated warehouse in Nigeria, consolidating its operations and expanding storage capacity. In June 2024, Jumia opened a warehouse in Morocco.

== Payment ==
In December 2021, Jumia launched a payment service provider (PSP), JumiaPay in Egypt upon regulatory approval. The PSP came as part of Jumia's strategic partnership with the National Bank of Egypt, with an objective of facilitating online payments as well as the distribution of various digital and financial services.

In May 2024, Jumia Nigeria launched two new Buy Now, Pay Later partnerships with Easybuy and CredPal, aimed at expanding Nigerian consumers' access to Jumia's marketplace, conveniently allowing them to make purchases and spread their payments over a set period. In the same month, JumiaPay Egypt and Contact expanded their partnership to provide various payment methods, facilitating the online purchasing process for customers.

== Advertising ==
In 2019, Jumia opened up its e-commerce platform to brands and corporate organisations to advertise because its platform is one of the most visited in Nigeria and Africa.

Jumia Advertising ranked third (and first in Africa) in Digital Ad Revenue Growth in 2022 in the world's top 10 fast-growing digital advertising players, by e-marketer - Inside Intelligence.

In 2023, Jumia Advertising launched programmatic Ads, offering opportunities for brands and businesses to grow in Africa.

== Websites ==
Jumia Nigeria's ecommerce website, Jumia.com.ng, is ranked number 1,503 in global internet engagement and the thirteenth most visited website in Nigeria in late April 2020, according to Alexa.com - a global internet traffic ranking firm. It is the sixth most-visited local website in Nigeria, as of April 2020, following a recent listing by IABC Africa Media.

Country	Domain name	Since
Algeria	jumia.dz	May 2013
Egypt	jumia.com.eg	July 2012
Ghana	jumia.com.gh	May 2014
Ivory Coast	jumia.ci	May 2013
Kenya	jumia.co.ke	May 2013
Morocco	jumia.ma	July 2012
Nigeria	jumia.com.ng	June 2012
Senegal	jumia.sn	May 2013
South Africa	jumia.co.za	July 2012
Tunisia	jumia.com.tn	
Uganda	jumia.ug	June 2016

== Short seller research ==
In May 2019, the short-seller Andrew Left of Citron Research referenced Jumia as a "securities fraud", citing material discrepancies regarding key financial metrics among a confidential investor presentation and Jumia's F-1 filing to the SEC from its April 2019 IPO. Andrew Left is known on Wall Street for making several claims of fraud and has faced calls to be investigated. Jumia's share price sank more than 50% in one week after the report was published. Citigroup, one of Jumia's IPO underwriters, released a report debunking most of Citron's allegations but noted that, "Jumia could do more to provide disclosure on some aspects of its operations, as a matter of transparency and best practice."

== Investors ==
In 2012, Kasuwa (which means Market in Hausa Language) was launched with the support of Rocket Internet, MTN, and Millicom, and was later renamed Jumia Group. In March 2016, Jumia Group secured over €300M of funding from MTN, Rocket Internet, AXA, Goldman Sachs, Orange and CDC.

As of 2019, the largest shareholder was MTN Group.

In December 2018, Pernod Ricard invested in Jumia.

In March 2019, Jumia received 50 million euros in investments from Mastercard.

In 2020, Rocket Internet and MTN Group sold their stakes in Jumia.

== See also ==
- Souq
