= Paul Loridant =

French politician (1948–2020)

Senator from Essonne
- In office 28 September 1986 – 26 September 2004

General Councillor for the Canton of Les Ulis
- In office 17 March 1985 – 2 October 1988

Mayor of Les Ulis
- In office 20 March 1977 – 16 March 2008

Personal details
- Born: 22 April 1948 Ille-sur-Têt, France
- Died: 22 December 2020 (aged 72) Villejuif, France
- Party: PS; MRC

Paul Loridant (22 April 1948 – 22 December 2020) was a French politician.

A member of the Citizen and Republican Movement, he served as a French Senator for Essonne, a General Councillor for the Canton of Les Ulis, and the Mayor of Les Ulis.

== Biography ==
Loridant was born on 22 April 1948 in Ille-sur-Têt. In 1971, he earned a degree in economics from the University of Paris 1 Pantheon-Sorbonne. He graduated from Sciences Po the following year and earned a master's degree from the University of Paris 1 in 1974. He served as Deputy Director of the Bank of France. After his retirement from his political career, he served as an advisor for territorial relations in the executive office. After leaving the Bank in 2012, he was a mediator for the Fédération Bancaire Française.

Loridant was elected to the Senate in 1986 and was one of the youngest members at the time. He was reelected in 1995 with support from the French Communist Party. During his time as a Senator, he served on the Committee of Cultural Affairs and the Finance Committee. He was the first leader of the France-Ireland relationship group in the Senate and was the auditor for the 37th session of the Institut des hautes études de défense nationale, the 26th session of the Centre des hautes études de l'Armement, and the 5th session of the Institut des hautes études de la sécurité intérieure. After failing to be reelected in 2004, he became an honorary Senator and Parliamentarian.

During his political career, Loridant first became a member of the Socialist Party and became the party's first federal secretary in Essonne. In 1993, he joined the Citizen and Republican Movement. He supported Ségolène Royal in the 2007 French presidential election, although she did not advance to the second round.

Loridant served as a General Councillor for the Canton of Les Ulis and was president of the socialist group in the Departmental Council of Essonne. He served until 1988. He was elected Mayor of Les Ulis in 1977 and reelected in 1983, 1989, 1995, and 2001. From 2008 to 2014, he served as a municipal councillor in the commune.

In addition to his political career, Loridant served as Vice-President of the Syndicat intercommunal pour l'aménagement hydraulique de la vallée de l'Yvette. He was also a member of the supervisory board of the Agence centrale des organismes de sécurité sociale, as well as the Observatoire de la sécurité des cartes de paiement.

Paul Loridant died in Villejuif on 22 December 2020 at the age of 72.

== Decorations ==
- Knight of the Legion of Honour
- Knight of the Order of Agricultural Merit
- Knight of the Ordre des Palmes académiques
- Commander of the Ordre national du Lion du Sénégal

== Works ==
- La politique spatiale française et européenne : conclusions du rapporteur (1993)
