= Paris =

Capital and largest city of France

- Capital city (Note: Also a commune, arrondissement and department)
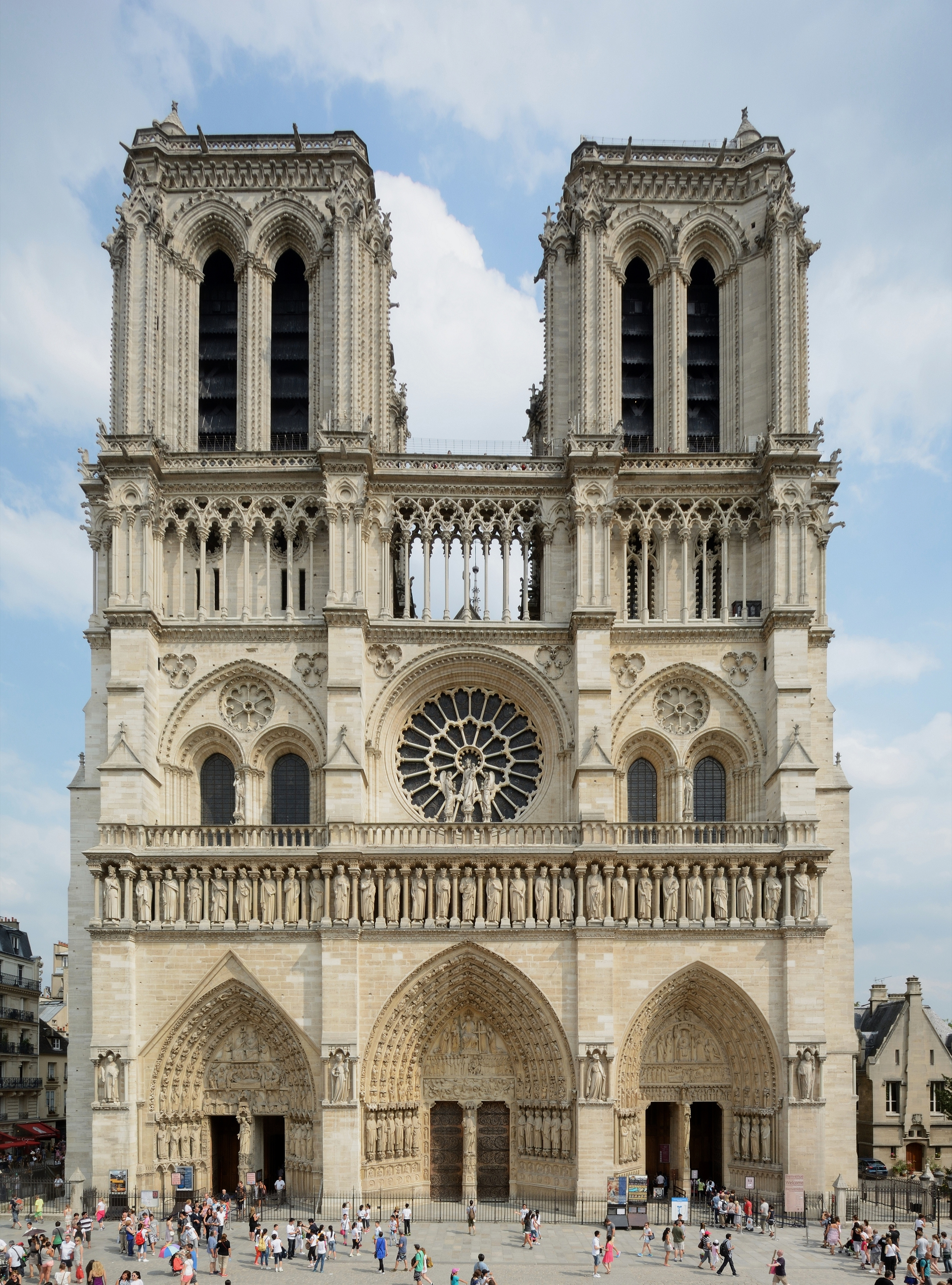
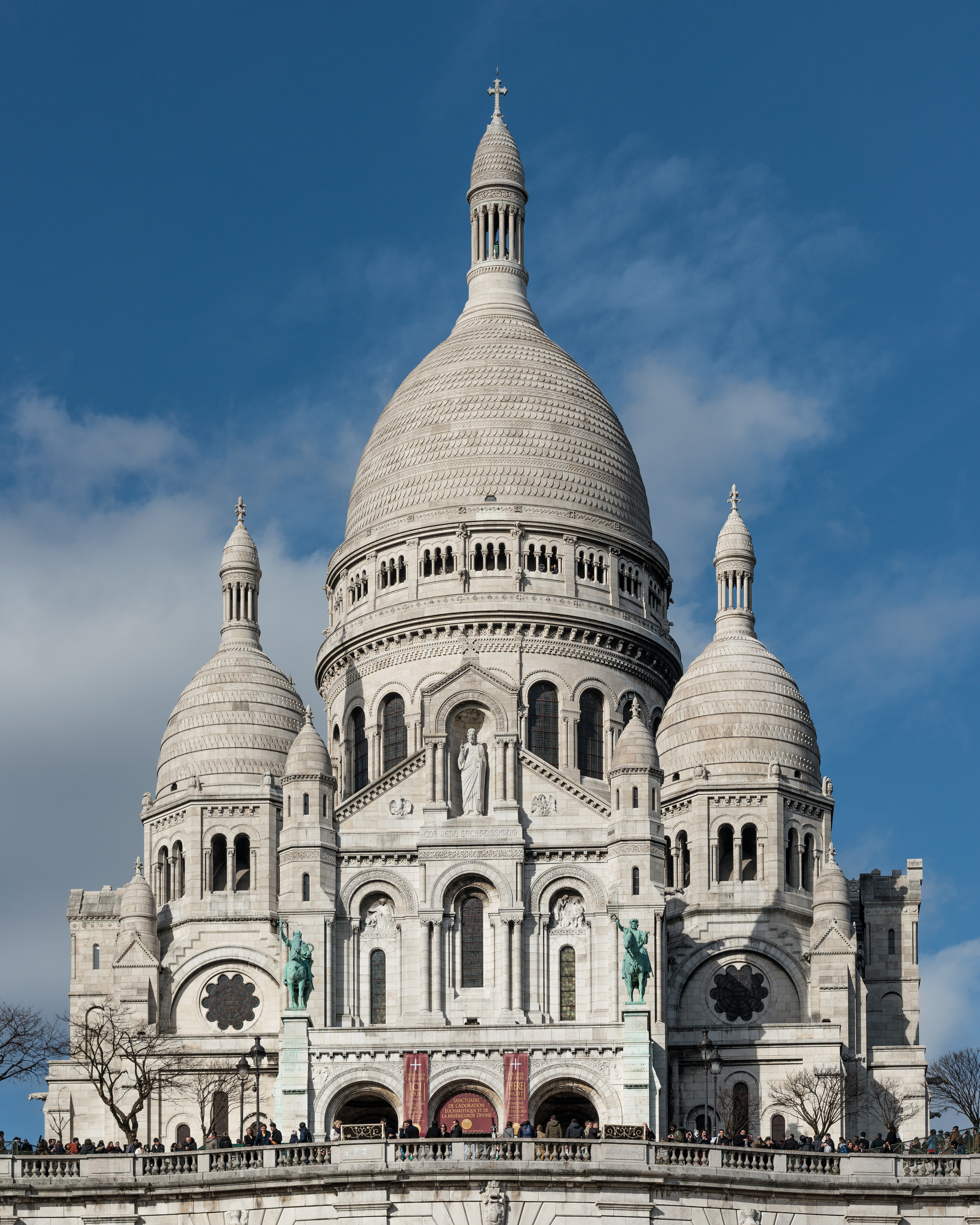
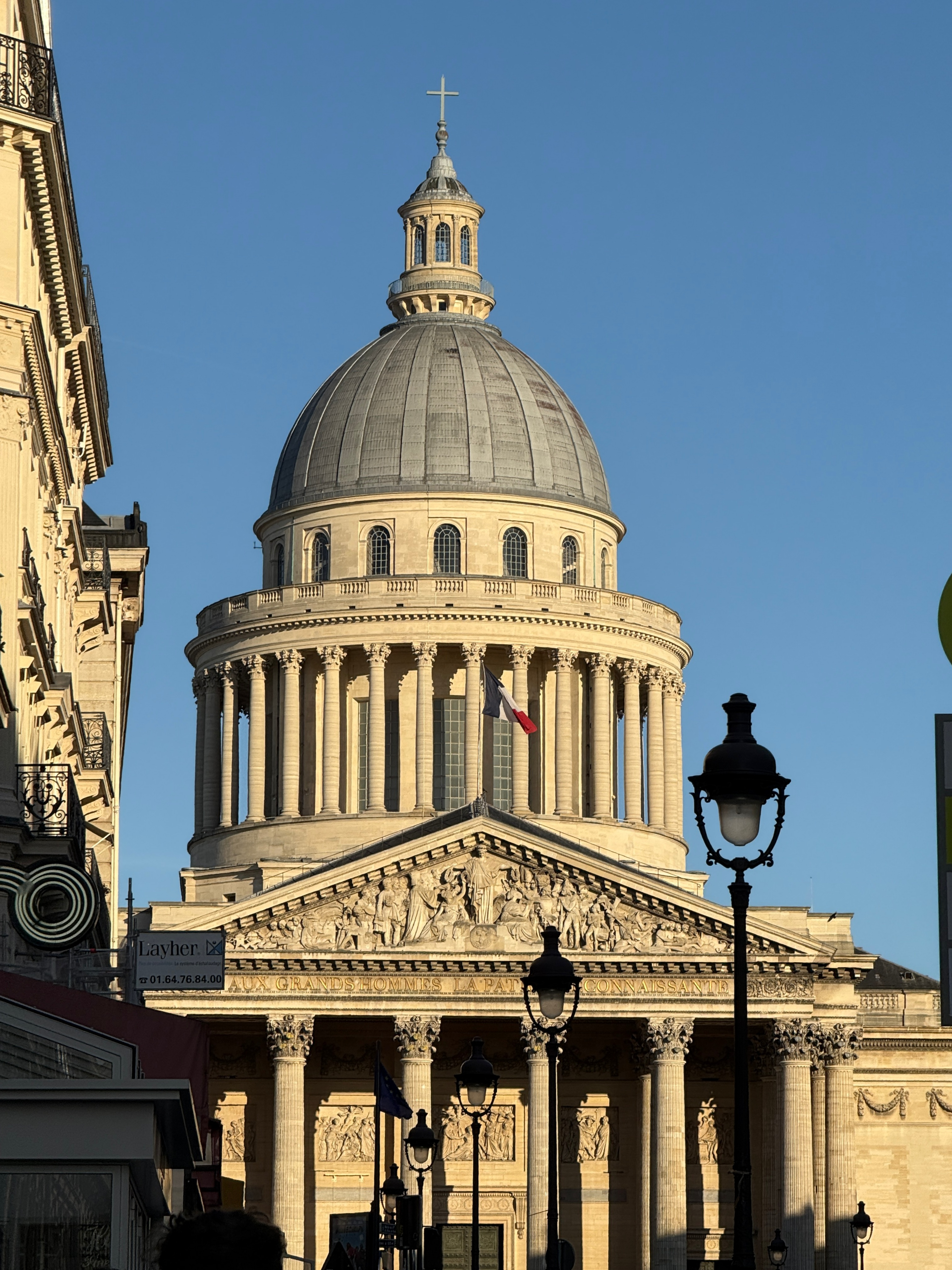
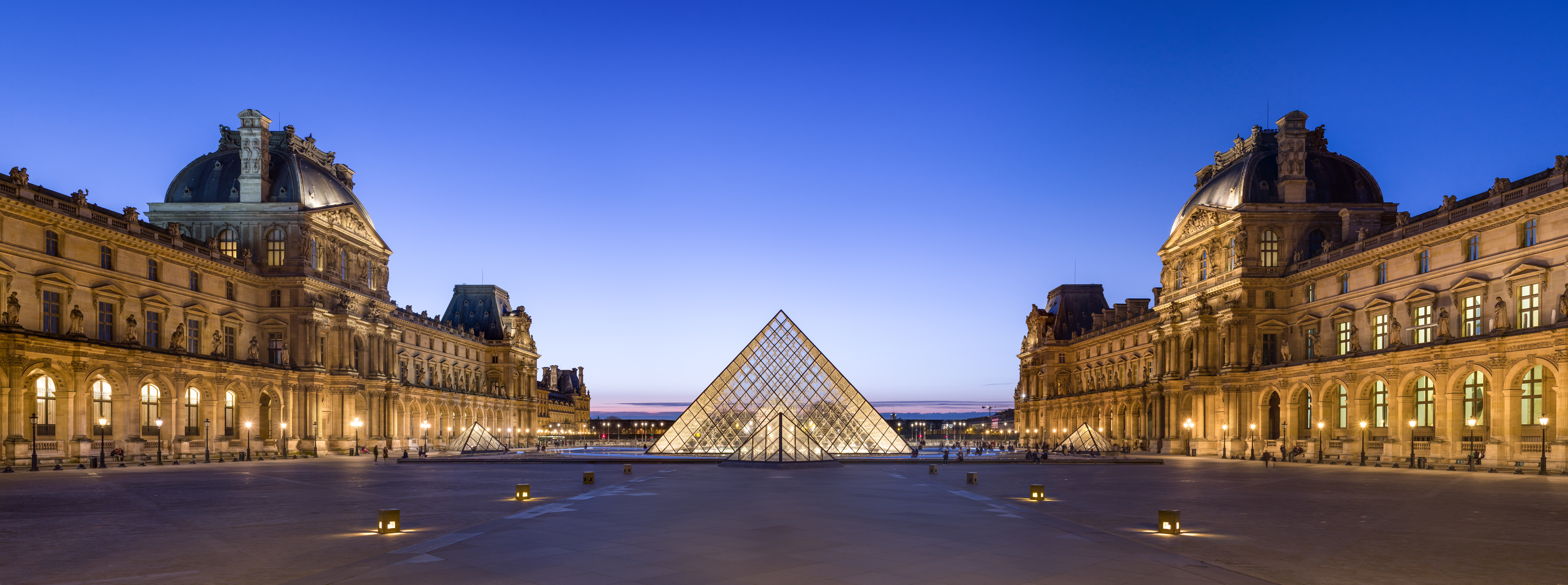
- Eiffel Tower and the Seine from Tour Saint-Jacques Notre-Dame Sacré-Cœur Panthéon Arc de Triomphe Palais Garnier The Louvre

- Flag Coat of arms Logo
- Motto(s): Fluctuat nec mergitur "Tossed by the waves but never sunk"
- Location of Paris
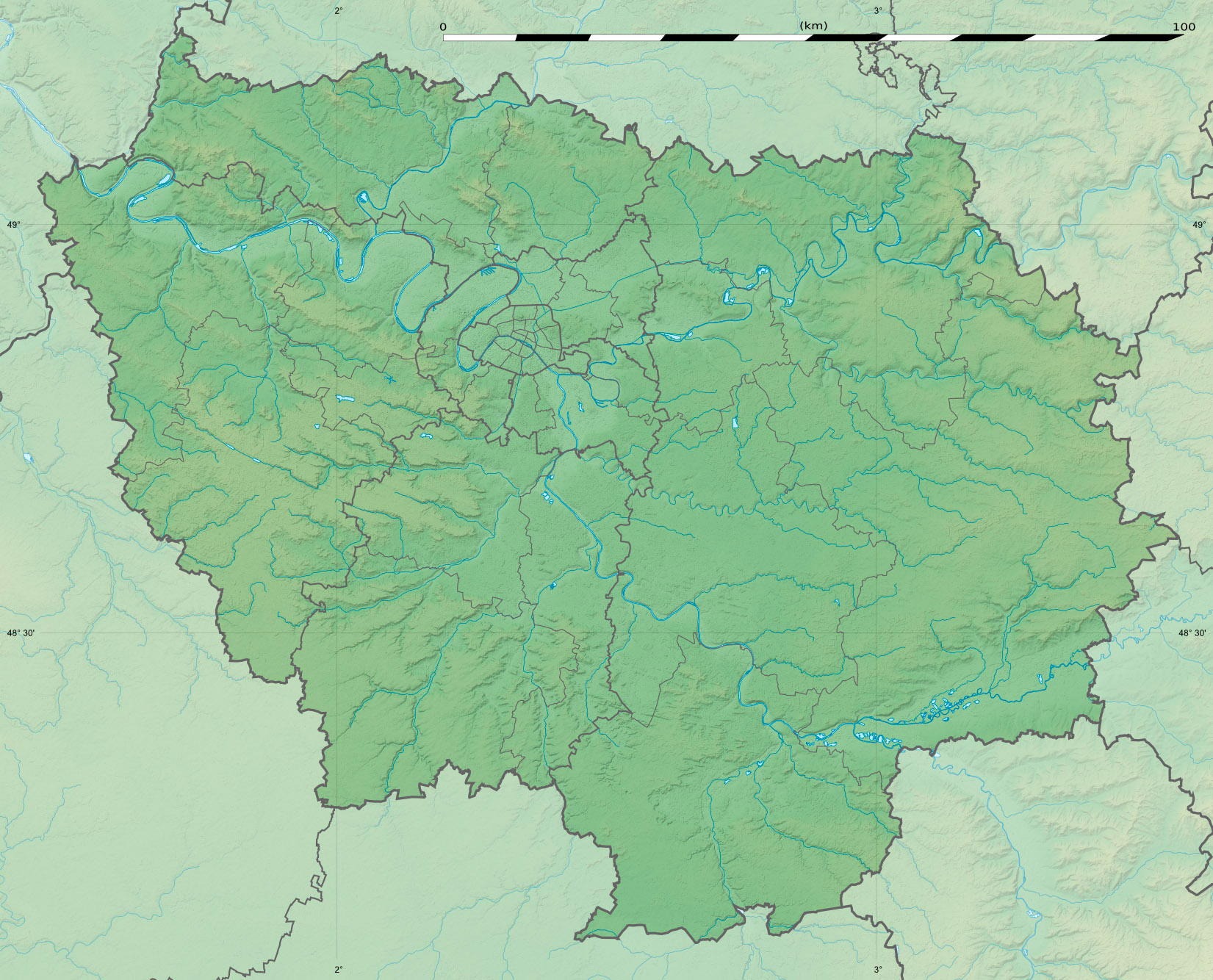
- Location within France Location within Île-de-France (region)
- Coordinates: 48°51′24″N 2°21′08″E
- Country: France
- Region: Île-de-France
- Department: Paris
- Arrondissement: Paris
- Intercommunality: Métropole du Grand Paris
- Subdivisions: 20 arrondissements

Government
  - Mayor (2026–32): Emmanuel Grégoire (PS)
- Area^{1}: 105.4 km^{2} (40.7 sq mi)
  - Urban: 2,824.2 km^{2} (1,090.4 sq mi)
  - Metro: 18,940.7 km^{2} (7,313.0 sq mi)
- Elevation: 78 m (256 ft)
- Highest elevation: 131 m (430 ft)
- Lowest elevation: 28 m (92 ft)
- Population (Jan 2026): 2,047,602
  - Rank: 9th in Europe; 1st in France
  - Density: 19,430/km^{2} (50,320/sq mi)
  - Urban (2023): 11,013,774
  - Urban density: 3,899.8/km^{2} (10,100/sq mi)
  - Metro (2023): 13,320,752
  - Metro density: 703.287/km^{2} (1,821.51/sq mi)
- Demonym(s): Parisian(s) (en) Parisien(s) (masc.), Parisienne(s) (fem.) (fr), Parigot(s) (masc.), "Parigote(s)" (fem.) (fr, colloquial)

GDP (nominal, 2024)
  - Capital City: €279.938 billion
  - Metro: €865.652 billion
- Time zone: UTC+01:00 (CET)
  - Summer (DST): UTC+02:00 (CEST)
- INSEE/Postal code: 75056 /75001–75020, 75116
- Website: www.paris.fr
- ^{1} French Land Register data, which excludes lakes, ponds, glaciers > 1 km^{2} (0.386 sq mi or 247 acres) and river estuaries.

Paris (Note: English: /ˈpærɪs/ PARR-iss; French: [paʁi]) is the capital and largest city of France, with an estimated city population of 2.04 million in an area of 105.4 km^{2} (40.7 sq mi), as of January 2026, and a metropolitan population of 13.3 million (2023). Located on the Seine in the centre of the Île-de-France region, it is the largest metropolitan area and fourth-most populous city in the European Union (EU). Paris is nicknamed the "City of Light" mainly due to its leading role in the Age of Enlightenment.

Administratively, Paris is divided into twenty arrondissements (districts), each with their own cultural identity. Haussmann's renovation of Paris, which created new boulevards, parks, and public works, gave birth to a modern city known as the "capital of the 19th century". Paris is a major railway, motorway, and air-transport hub; in 2024 Charles de Gaulle Airport was the EU's busiest airport. Paris has one of the most sustainable transportation systems in the world and is one of only two cities that have received the Sustainable Transport Award twice. Its Art Nouveau-decorated Métro has become a symbol of the city. Paris is known for its museums and architectural landmarks: the Louvre is the largest and most-visited museum in the world; the Musée d'Orsay, Musée Marmottan Monet, and Musée de l'Orangerie are noted for their collections of French Impressionist art, while the Musée National d'Art Moderne, Musée Rodin, and Musée Picasso are noted for their collections of modern and contemporary art. Parts of the city along the Seine have been designated a UNESCO World Heritage Site since 1991.

The president of France and both houses of the French Parliament sit in Paris. Paris is home to several United Nations organisations, including UNESCO, as well as other international organisations such as the OECD, the International Bureau of Weights and Measures (in neighbouring Saint-Cloud), the International Energy Agency, the Organisation internationale de la Francophonie, the International Federation for Human Rights, and the Fédération internationale de l'Automobile, along with European bodies such as the European Space Agency, the European Banking Authority, and the European Securities and Markets Authority. The city hosts many sporting events, such as the French Open, and is the home of the association football club Paris Saint-Germain and the rugby union club Stade Français. Paris has also hosted the Summer Olympics three times, in 1900, 1924 and 2024.

== Etymology ==
The ancient oppidum that corresponds to the modern city of Paris was first mentioned in the mid-1st century BC by Julius Caesar as Lutetia Parisiorum ('Lutetia of the Parisii') and is later attested as Parision in the 5th century AD, then as Paris in 1265. During the Roman period, it was commonly known as Lutetia in Latin, which is interpreted as either stemming from the Celtic root *lukot- ('mouse'), or from *luto- ('marsh, swamp').

The name Paris is derived from its early inhabitants, the Parisii, a Gallic tribe from the Iron Age and the Roman period. The meaning of the Gaulish ethnonym remains debated. According to Xavier Delamarre, it may derive from the Celtic root pario- ('cauldron'). Alfred Holder interpreted the name as 'the makers' or 'the commanders', by comparing it to the Welsh peryff ('lord, commander'), both possibly descending from a Proto-Celtic form reconstructed as *kwar-is-io-. Alternatively, Pierre-Yves Lambert proposed to translate Parisii as the 'spear people', by connecting the first element to the Old Irish carr ('spear'), derived from an earlier *kwar-sā.

Residents of the city are known by the demonym "Parisiens" ([paʁizjɛ̃]) in French, and as "Parisians" in English. They are also pejoratively called Parigots ([paʁiɡo]) in the former language.

== History ==
=== Origins ===
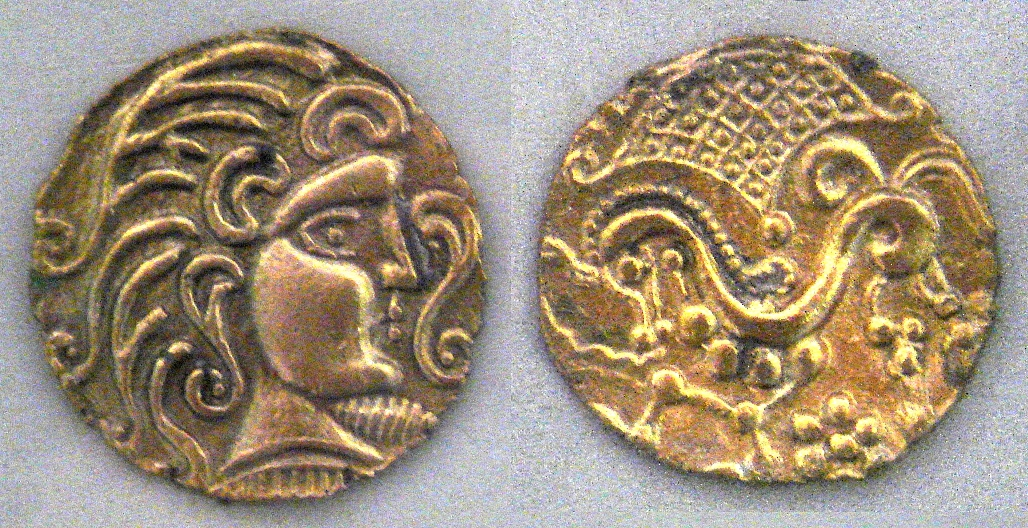
Gold coins minted by the Parisii, 1st century BC

The Parisii people inhabited the Paris area from around the middle of the 3rd century BC. One of the area's major north–south trade routes crossed the Seine on the Île de la Cité, which gradually became an important trading centre. The Parisii traded with many river towns, some as far away as the Iberian Peninsula, and minted their own coins.

Julius Caesar conquered the Paris Basin for the Roman Republic in 52 BC and began the Roman settlement on Paris's Left Bank. The Roman town was originally called Lutetia, more fully, Lutetia Parisiorum, "Lutetia of the Parisii", modern French Lutèce. It became a prosperous city with a forum, baths, temples, theatres, and an amphitheatre.

By the end of the Western Roman Empire, the town was known as Parisius, a Latin name that later became Paris in French. Christianity was introduced in the middle of the 3rd century AD by Saint Denis, the first Bishop of Paris: according to legend, when he refused to renounce his faith before the Roman occupiers, he was beheaded on the hill which became known as Mons Martyrum (Latin "Hill of Martyrs"), later "Montmartre", from where he walked headless to the north of the city; the place where he fell and was buried became an important religious shrine, the Basilica of Saint-Denis, and many French kings are buried there.

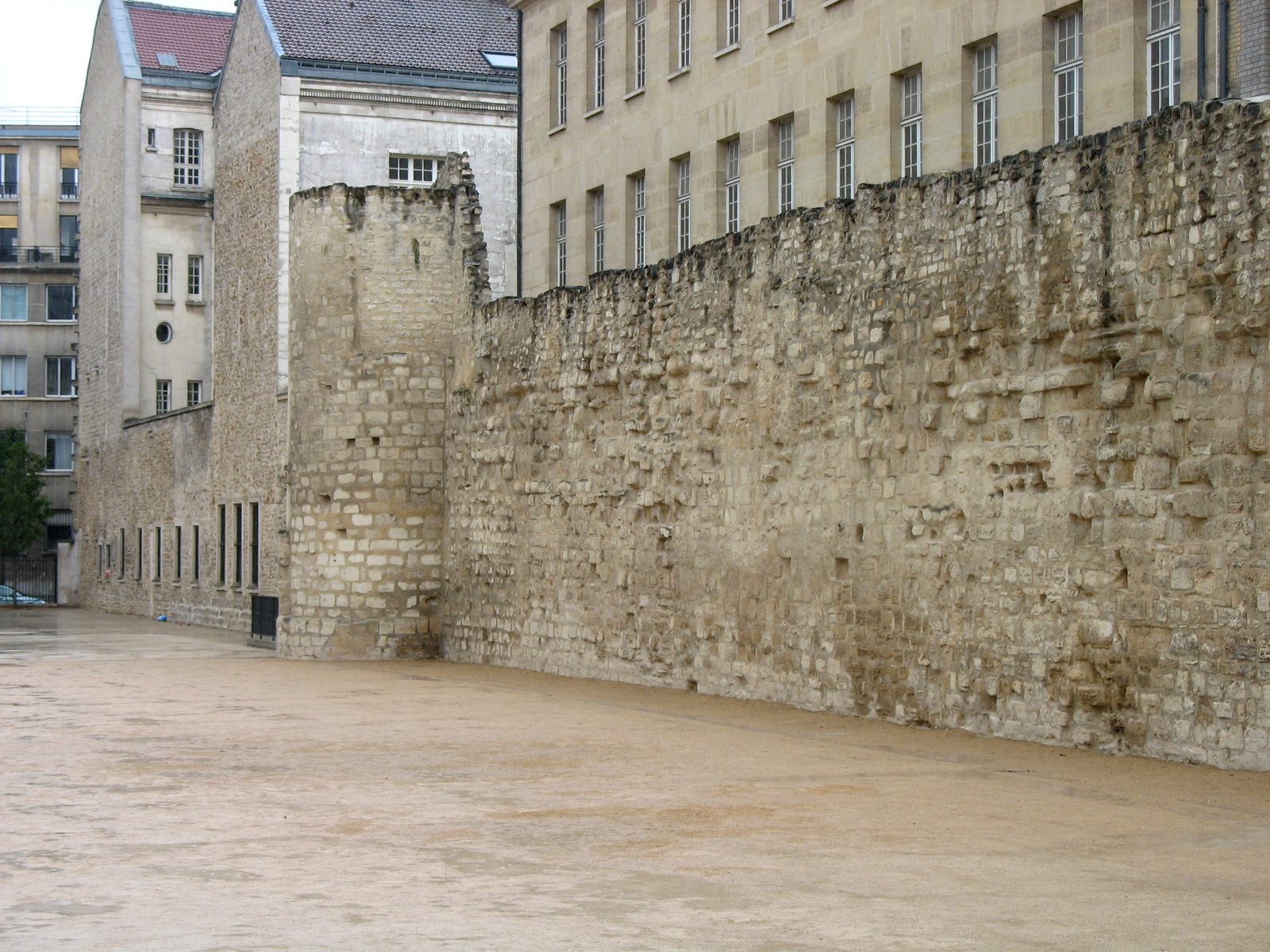
The Wall of Philippe Auguste, oldest city wall in Paris

Clovis the Frank, the first king of the Merovingian dynasty, made the city his capital from 508. As the Frankish domination of Gaul began, there was a gradual immigration by the Franks to Paris, and the Parisian Francien dialects were born. Fortification of the Île de la Cité failed to avert sacking by Vikings in 845. Still, Paris's strategic importance—with its bridges preventing ships from passing—was established by successful defence in the Siege of Paris (885–886), for which the then Count of Paris (comte de Paris), Odo of France, was elected king of West Francia. From the Capetian dynasty that began with the 987 election of Hugh Capet, Count of Paris and Duke of the Franks (duc des Francs), as king of a unified West Francia, Paris gradually became the largest and most prosperous city in France.

=== High and Late Middle Ages to Louis XIV ===
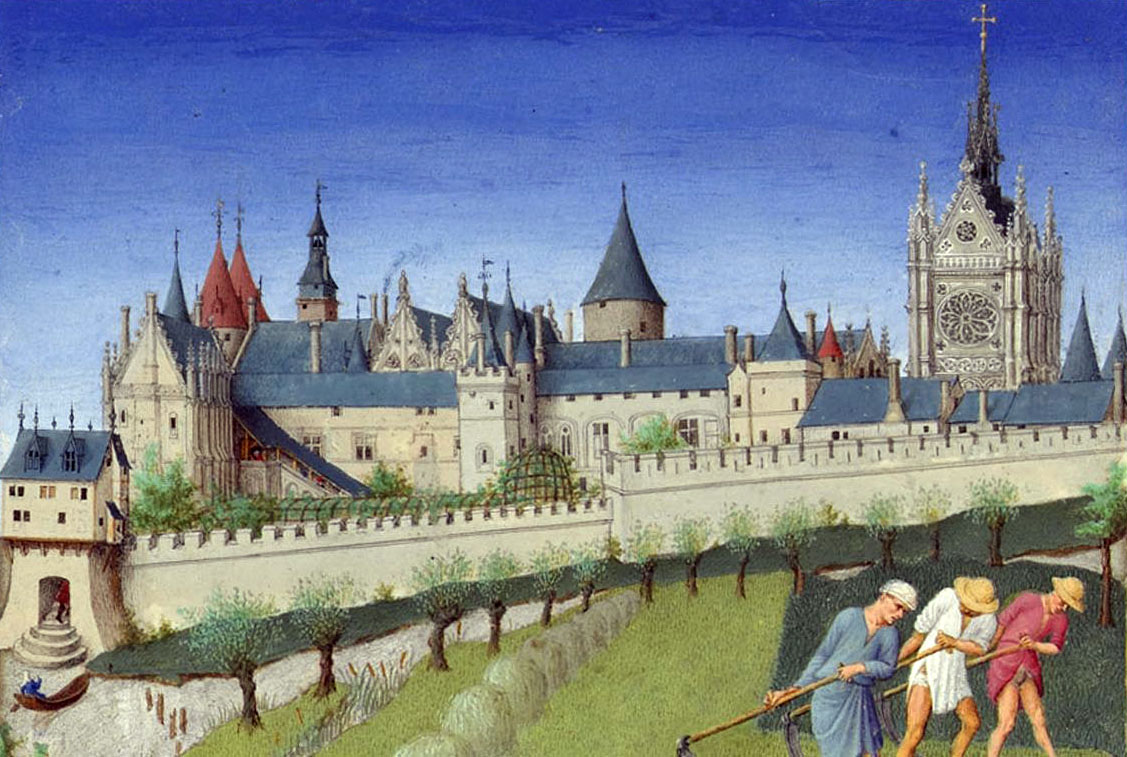
The Palais de la Cité and Sainte-Chapelle, viewed from the Left Bank, from the Très Riches Heures du duc de Berry, June 1410

By the end of the 12th century, Paris had become the political, economic, religious, and cultural capital of France. Maurice de Sully, bishop of Paris, started the construction of the Notre Dame Cathedral in 1163, and was completed after 182 years. After the marshland between the river Seine and its slower 'dead arm' to its north was filled in from around the 10th century, Paris's cultural centre began to move to the Right Bank. In 1137, a new city marketplace (today's Les Halles) replaced the two smaller ones on the Île de la Cité and Place de Grève (Place de l'Hôtel de Ville). The latter location housed the headquarters of Paris's river trade corporation. This organisation later became, unofficially (although formally in later years), Paris's first municipal government.

In the late 12th century, Philip Augustus extended the Louvre fortress to defend the city against river invasions from the west, gave the city its first walls between 1190 and 1215, rebuilt its bridges to either side of its central island, and paved its main thoroughfares. In 1190, he transformed Paris's former cathedral school into a student-teacher corporation that became the University of Paris and drew students from all of Europe.

With 200,000 inhabitants in 1328, Paris, then already the capital of France, was the most populous city of Europe. By comparison, London in 1300 had 80,000 inhabitants. Around 1340 the city had between 250,000 and 300,000 inhabitants. By the early fourteenth century, so much filth had collected inside urban Europe that French and Italian cities were naming streets after human waste. In medieval Paris, several street names were inspired by merde, the French word for "shit".

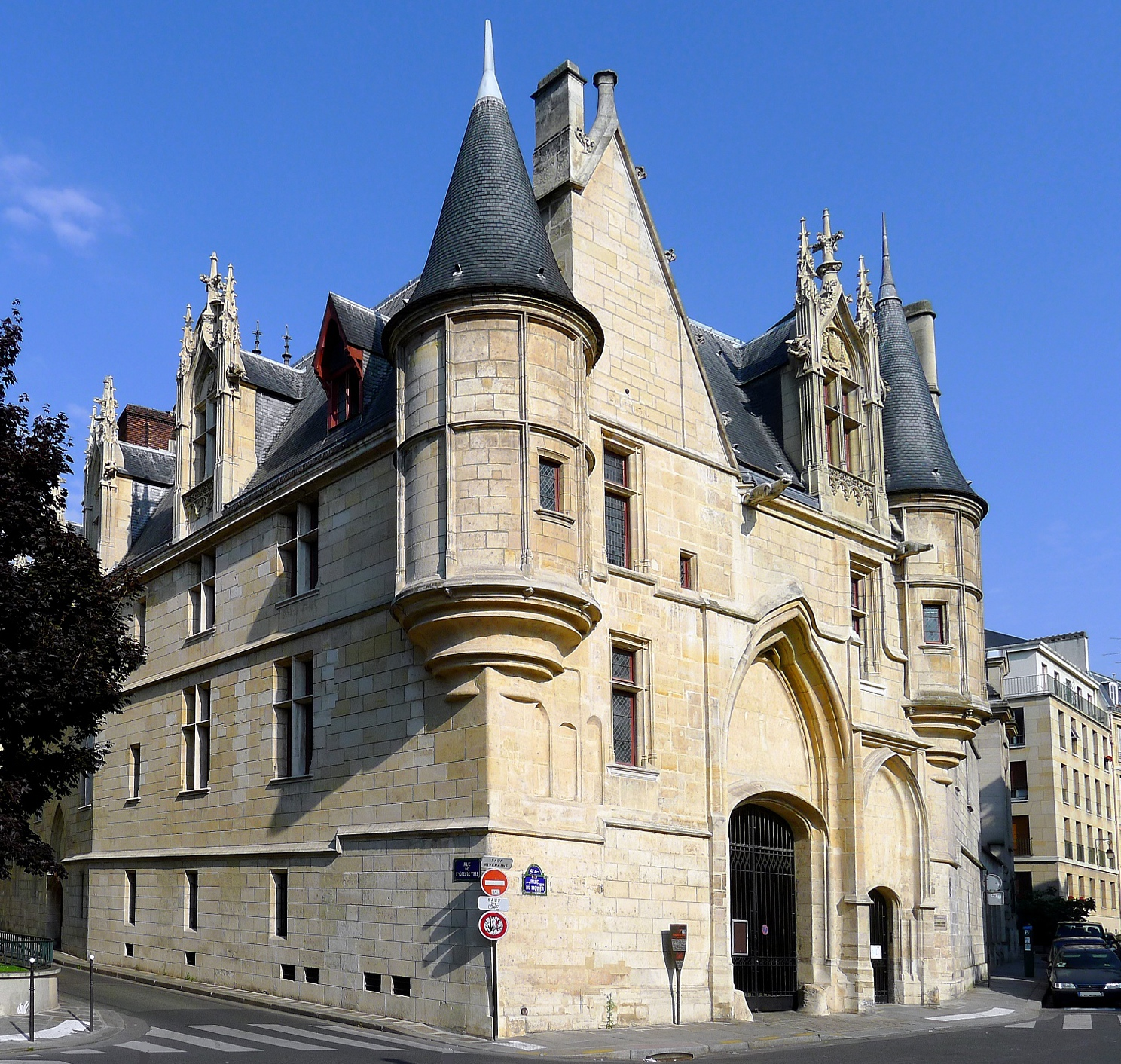
The Hôtel de Sens (c. 15th–16th), former residence of the Archbishop of Sens

During the Hundred Years' War, Paris was occupied by England-friendly Burgundian forces from 1418, before being occupied outright by the English when Henry V of England entered the French capital in 1420; despite a 1429 effort by Joan of Arc to liberate the city, it would remain under English occupation until 1436.

In the late 16th century French Wars of Religion, Paris was a stronghold of the Catholic League, the organisers of 24 August 1572 St. Bartholomew's Day massacre in which thousands of French Protestants were killed. The conflicts ended when pretender to the throne Henry IV, after converting to Catholicism to gain entry to the capital, entered the city in 1594 to claim the crown of France. This king made several improvements to the capital during his reign: he completed the construction of Paris's first uncovered, sidewalk-lined bridge, the Pont Neuf, built a Louvre extension connecting it to the Tuileries Palace, and created the first Paris residential square, the Place Royale, now Place des Vosges. Despite Henry IV's efforts to improve city circulation, the narrowness of Paris's streets was a contributing factor in his assassination near Les Halles marketplace in 1610.

During the 17th century, Cardinal Richelieu, chief minister of Louis XIII, was determined to make Paris the most beautiful city in Europe. He built five new bridges, a new chapel for the College of Sorbonne, and a palace for himself, the Palais-Cardinal. After Richelieu died in 1642, it was renamed the Palais-Royal.

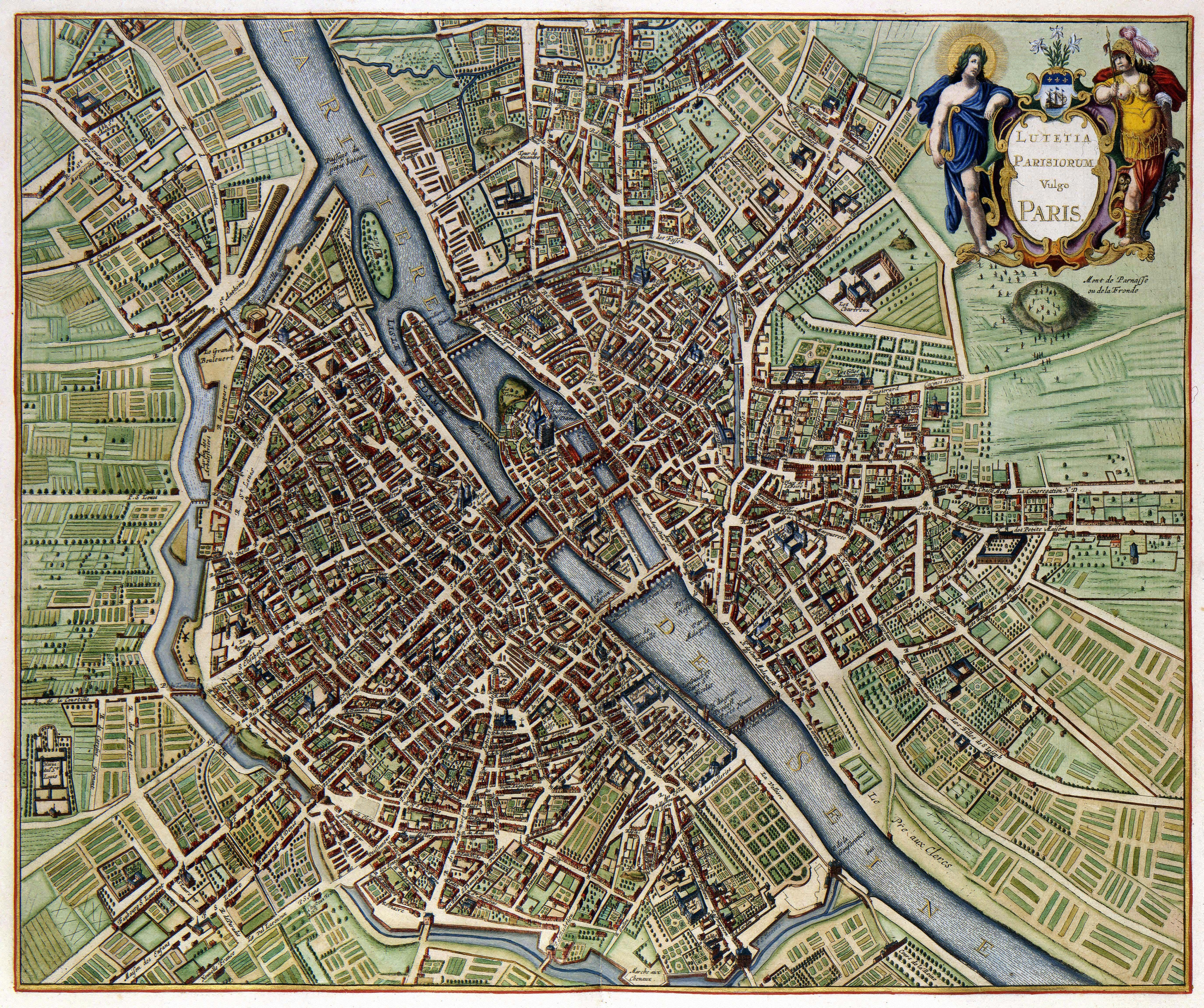
Lutetia Parisiorum vulgo Paris, Plan de Paris en 1657, Jan Janssonius

Due to the Parisian uprisings during the Fronde civil war, Louis XIV moved his court to a new palace, Versailles, in 1682. Although no longer the capital of France, arts and sciences in the city flourished with the Comédie-Française, the Academy of Painting, and the French Academy of Sciences. To demonstrate that the city was safe from attack, the king had the city walls demolished and replaced with tree-lined boulevards that would become the Grands Boulevards. Other marks of his reign were the Collège des Quatre-Nations, the Place Vendôme, the Place des Victoires, and Les Invalides.

Paris has been one of the world's major centres of finance, diplomacy, commerce, culture, fashion, and gastronomy since the 17th century.

=== 18th and 19th centuries ===
Paris grew in population from about 400,000 in 1640 to 650,000 in 1780. A new boulevard named the Champs-Élysées extended the city west to Étoile, while the working-class neighbourhood of the Faubourg Saint-Antoine on the eastern side of the city grew increasingly crowded with poor migrant workers from other regions of France. Paris's role in education and sciences led Paris to be known as the City of Light during the age of Enlightenment in the 18th century. (Note: French: la Ville Lumière)

The storming of the Bastille on 14 July 1789, by Jean-Pierre Houël

In the summer of 1789, Paris became the centre stage of the French Revolution. On 14 July, a mob seized the arsenal at the Invalides, acquiring thousands of guns, with which it stormed the Bastille, a principal symbol of royal authority. The first independent Paris Commune, or city council, met in the Hôtel de Ville and elected a Mayor, the astronomer Jean Sylvain Bailly, on 15 July.

Louis XVI and the royal family were brought to Paris and incarcerated in the Tuileries Palace. In 1793, as the revolution turned increasingly radical, the king, queen, and mayor were beheaded by guillotine in the Reign of Terror, along with more than 16,000 others throughout France. The property of the aristocracy and the church was nationalised, and the city's churches were closed, sold, or demolished. A succession of revolutionary factions ruled Paris until 9 November 1799 (coup d'état du 18 brumaire), when Napoleon Bonaparte seized power as First Consul.

The population of Paris had dropped by 100,000 during the Revolution, but after 1799 it surged with 160,000 new residents, reaching 660,000 by 1815. Napoleon replaced the elected government of Paris with a prefect who reported directly to him. He began erecting monuments to military glory, including the Arc de Triomphe, and improved the neglected infrastructure of the city with new fountains, the Canal de l'Ourcq, Père Lachaise Cemetery and the city's first metal bridge, the Pont des Arts. The Arc de Triomphe was eventually completed in 1836.

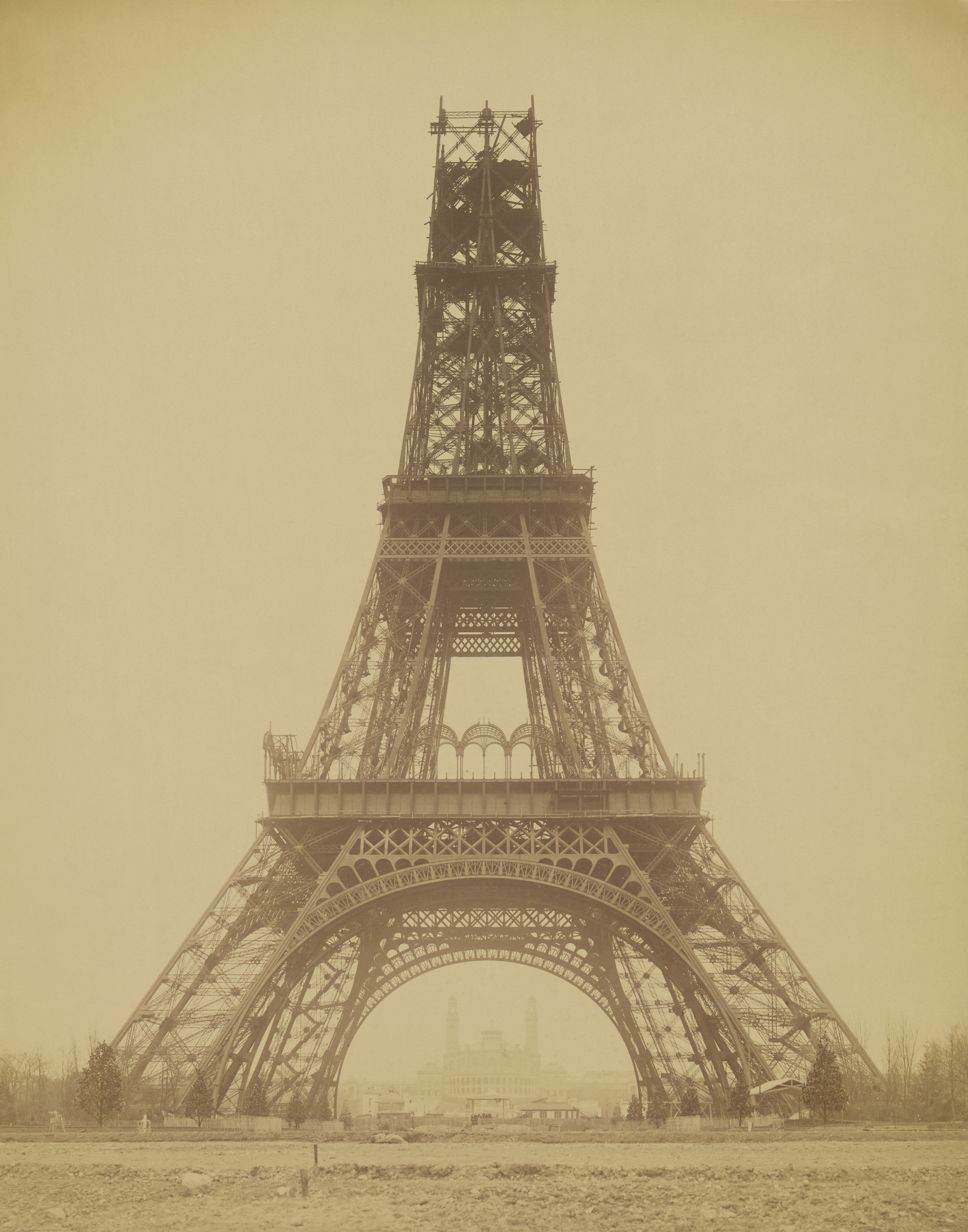
The Eiffel Tower, under construction in November 1888, startled Parisians—and the world—with its modernity.

During the Restoration, the bridges and squares of Paris were returned to their pre-Revolution names; the July Revolution in 1830, commemorated by the July Column on the Place de la Bastille, brought to power a constitutional monarch, Louis Philippe I. The first railway line to Paris opened in 1837, beginning a new period of massive migration from the provinces to the city. In 1848, Louis-Philippe was overthrown by a popular uprising in the streets of Paris. His successor, Napoleon III, alongside the newly appointed prefect of the Seine, Georges-Eugène Haussmann, launched a huge public works project to build wide new boulevards, a new opera house, a central market, new aqueducts, sewers and parks, including the Bois de Boulogne and Bois de Vincennes. In 1860, Napoleon III annexed the surrounding towns and created eight new arrondissements, expanding Paris to its current limits.

During the Franco-Prussian War (1870–1871), Paris was besieged by the Prussian Army. Following several months of blockade, hunger, and then bombardment by the Prussians, the city was forced to surrender on 28 January 1871. After seizing power in Paris on 28 March, a revolutionary government known as the Paris Commune held power for two months, before being harshly suppressed by the French army during the "Bloody Week" at the end of May 1871.

In the late 19th century, Paris hosted two major international expositions: the 1889 Universal Exposition, which featured the new Eiffel Tower, was held to mark the centennial of the French Revolution; and the 1900 Universal Exposition gave Paris the Pont Alexandre III, the Grand Palais, the Petit Palais and the first Paris Métro line. Paris became the laboratory of Naturalism (Émile Zola) and Symbolism (Charles Baudelaire and Paul Verlaine), and of Impressionism in art (Courbet, Manet, Monet, Renoir).

=== 20th and 21st centuries ===
By 1901, the population of Paris had grown to about 2,715,000. At the beginning of the century, artists from around the world, including Pablo Picasso, Modigliani, and Henri Matisse made Paris their home. It was the birthplace of Fauvism, Cubism and abstract art, and authors such as Marcel Proust were exploring new approaches to literature.

During the First World War, Paris sometimes found itself on the front line; 600 to 1,000 Paris taxis played a small but highly important symbolic role in transporting 6,000 soldiers to the front line at the First Battle of the Marne. The city was also bombed by Zeppelins and shelled by German long-range guns. In the years after the war, known as Les Années Folles, Paris continued to be a mecca for writers, musicians and artists from around the world, including Ernest Hemingway, Igor Stravinsky, James Joyce, Josephine Baker, Eva Kotchever, Henry Miller, Anaïs Nin, Sidney Bechet and Salvador Dalí.

In the years after the peace conference, the city was also home to growing numbers of students and activists from French colonies and other Asian and African countries, who later became leaders of their countries, such as Ho Chi Minh, Zhou Enlai and Léopold Sédar Senghor.

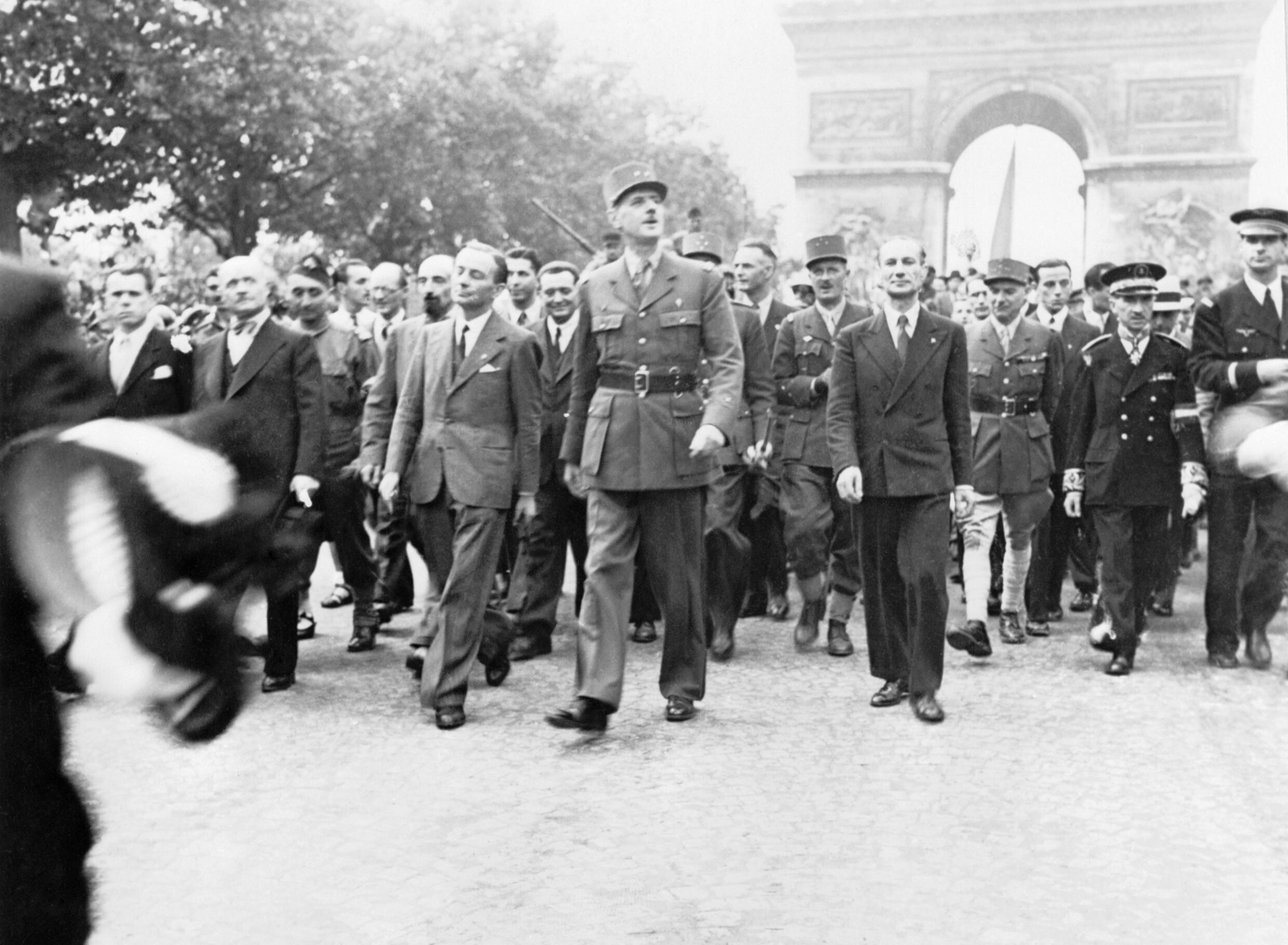
General Charles de Gaulle on the Champs-Élysées celebrating the liberation of Paris, 26 August 1944

On 14 June 1940, the German army marched into Paris, which had been declared an "open city". On 16–17 July 1942, following German orders, the French police and gendarmes arrested 12,884 Jews, including 4,115 children, and confined them during five days at the Vel d'Hiv, from which they were transported by train to the extermination camp at Auschwitz. None of the children came back. On 25 August 1944, the city was liberated by the French 2nd Armoured Division and the 4th Infantry Division of the United States Army. General Charles de Gaulle led a huge and emotional crowd down the Champs Élysées towards Notre Dame de Paris and made a rousing speech from the Hôtel de Ville.

Paris became involved in the Algerian War for independence, which occurred in the 1950s and 1960s; in August 1961, the pro-independence FLN, targeted and killed 11 Paris policemen, leading to the imposition of a curfew on Muslims of Algeria (who, at that time, were French citizens). On 17 October 1961, an unauthorised but peaceful protest demonstration of Algerians against the curfew led to violent confrontations between the police and demonstrators, in which at least 40 people were killed. The anti-independence Organisation armée secrète (OAS) carried out a series of bombings in Paris throughout 1961 and 1962.

In May 1968, protesting students occupied the Sorbonne and put up barricades in the Latin Quarter. Thousands of Parisian blue-collar workers joined the students, and the movement grew into a two-week general strike. Supporters of the government won the June elections by a large majority. The May 1968 events in France resulted in the break-up of the University of Paris into 13 independent campuses. In 1975, the National Assembly changed the status of Paris to that of other French cities and, on 25 March 1977, Jacques Chirac became the first elected mayor of Paris since 1793.

The Tour Maine-Montparnasse, the tallest building in the city at 57 storeys and 210 m (689 ft) high, was built between 1969 and 1973. It was highly controversial, and it remains the only building in the centre of the city over 32 storeys high. The population of Paris dropped from 2,850,000 in 1954 to 2,152,000 in 1990, as middle-class families moved to the suburbs. A suburban railway network, the RER (Réseau Express Régional), was built to complement the Métro; the Périphérique expressway encircling the city was completed in 1973. The bank of the Seine in the city centre, which includes the Louvre and the Eiffel Tower was classified as a UNESCO World Heritage Site in 1991.

Most of the postwar presidents of the Fifth Republic wanted to leave their own monuments in Paris; President Georges Pompidou started the Centre Georges Pompidou (1977), Valéry Giscard d'Estaing began the Musée d'Orsay (1986); President François Mitterrand had the Opéra Bastille built (1985–1989), the new site of the Bibliothèque nationale de France (1996), the Arche de la Défense (1985–1989) in La Défense, as well as the Louvre Pyramid with its underground courtyard (1983–1989); Jacques Chirac (2006), the Musée du quai Branly.

In the early 21st century, the population of Paris began to increase slowly again, as more young people moved into the city. It reached 2.25 million in 2011. In March 2001, Bertrand Delanoë became the first socialist mayor; he was re-elected in March 2008. Bertrand Delanoë also transformed a section of the highway along the Left Bank of the Seine into an urban promenade and park, the Promenade des Berges de la Seine, which he inaugurated in June 2013.

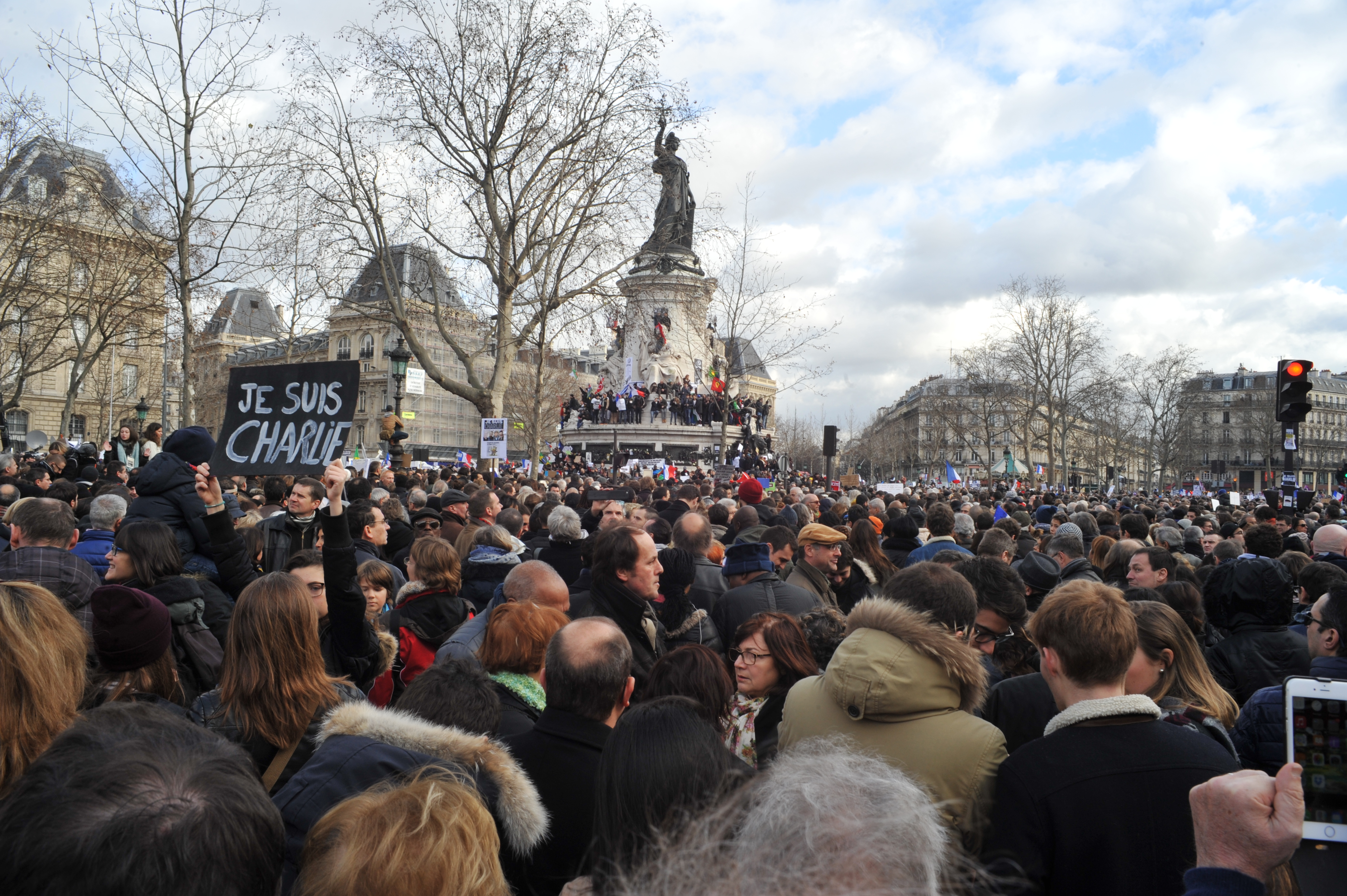
Demonstrators at the Place de la République, Paris, 11 January 2015, during the Republican marches after the Charlie Hebdo shooting

In 2007, President Nicolas Sarkozy launched the Grand Paris project to integrate Paris more closely with the towns in the region around it. After many modifications, the new area, named the Metropolis of Grand Paris, with a population of 6.7 million, was created on 1 January 2016. The City of Paris and the national government approved the plans for the Grand Paris Express four years later, totalling 205 km (127 mi) of automated metro lines to connect Paris, the innermost three departments around Paris, airports and high-speed rail (TGV) stations, at an estimated cost of €35 billion. The system is scheduled to be completed by 2030.

A series of attacks occurred in the Paris region, especially in Paris, in January 2015, the most serious being the shooting at the offices of Charlie Hebdo. 17 people died in the attacks, which Al-Qaeda in the Arabian Peninsula claimed responsibility. 1.5 million people marched in Paris in a show of solidarity against terrorism and in support of freedom of speech. Terrorist attacks, claimed by ISIL, occurred again in November, which killed 130 people and injured more than 350.

In an aim to limit the effects of climate change below 2 °C, the Paris Agreement was signed by 196 nations of the United Nations Framework Convention on Climate Change on 22 April 2016 in Paris. The following year, billionaire François Pinault received a 50‑year lease to convert the historic Bourse de Commerce into a contemporary art museum, overseen by Japanese architect Tadao Ando. Construction was delayed by the COVID-19 pandemic, reopening in May 2021. The Notre Dame Cathedral caught fire on 15 April 2019, beginning in the eaves of its roof, engulfing the spire and most of the roof. Firefighters were able to control the blaze, saving the main structure including the bell towers and rose windows, and there were no injuries; it was reopened on 7 December 2024.

In terms of international connectedness, as of 2024, Paris was one of eight cities worldwide that was classified as an "Alpha+" city by the Globalization and World Cities Research Network.

== Geography ==
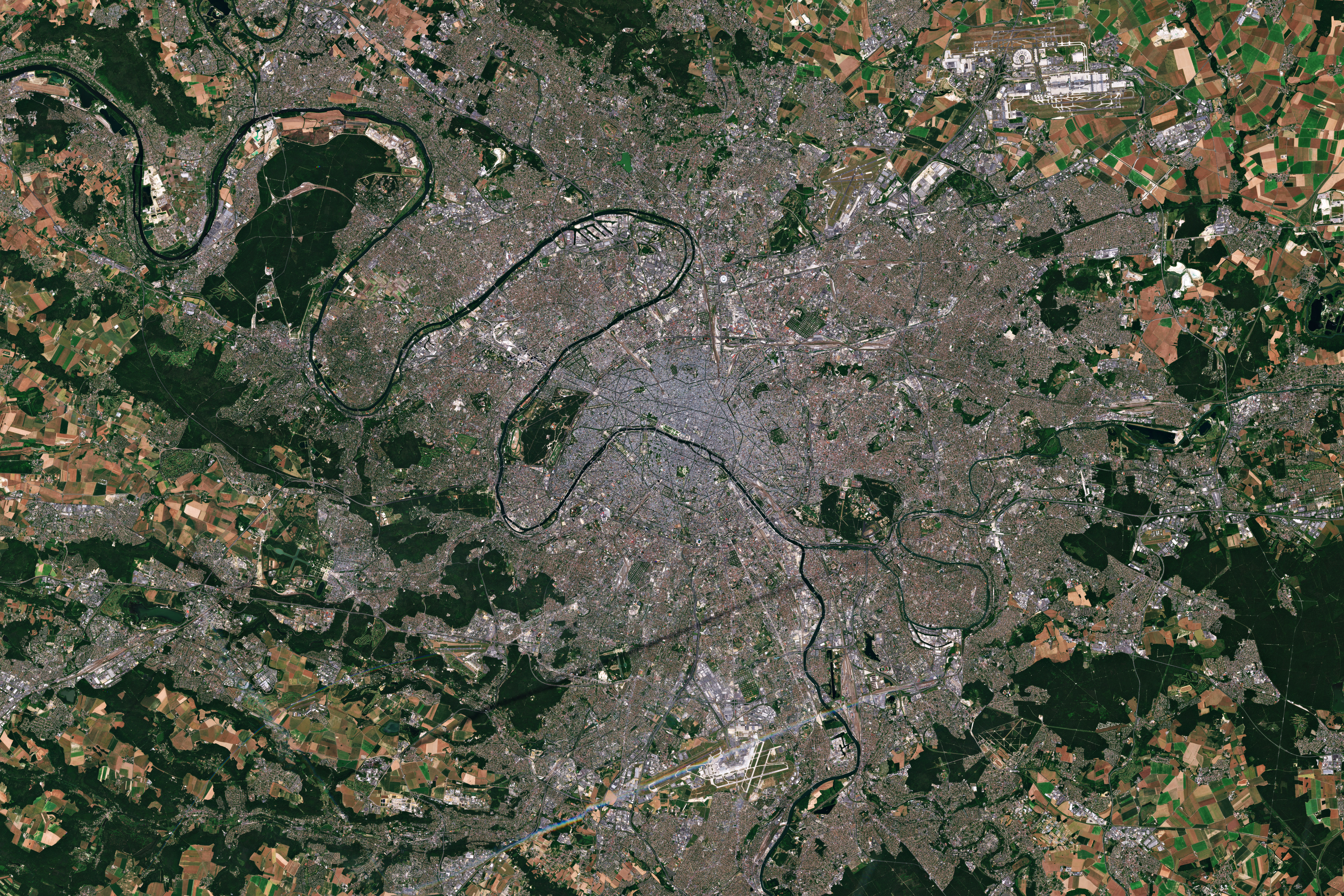
A 2022 satellite image of Paris, by ESA's Sentinel-2 mission

Paris is located in northern central France, in a north-bending arc of the river Seine, whose crest includes two islands, the Île Saint-Louis and the larger Île de la Cité, which form the oldest part of Paris. The river's mouth on the English Channel (La Manche) is about 233 mi (375 km) downstream from Paris. Paris is spread widely on both banks of the river. Overall, Paris is relatively flat, and the lowest point is 35 m (115 ft) above sea level. Paris has several prominent hills, the highest of which is Montmartre at 130 m (427 ft).

Excluding the outlying parks of Bois de Boulogne and Bois de Vincennes, Paris covers an oval measuring about 87 km^{2} (34 sq mi) in area, enclosed by the 35 km (22 mi) ring road, the Boulevard Périphérique. Paris's last major annexation of outlying territories in 1860 gave it its modern form, and created the 20 clockwise-spiralling arrondissements (municipal boroughs). From the 1860 area of 78 km^{2} (30 sq mi), the city limits were expanded marginally to 86.9 km^{2} (33.6 sq mi) in the 1920s. In 1929, the Bois de Boulogne and Bois de Vincennes forest parks were annexed to the city, bringing its area to about 105 km^{2} (41 sq mi). The metropolitan area is 2,300 km^{2} (890 sq mi).

=== Climate ===
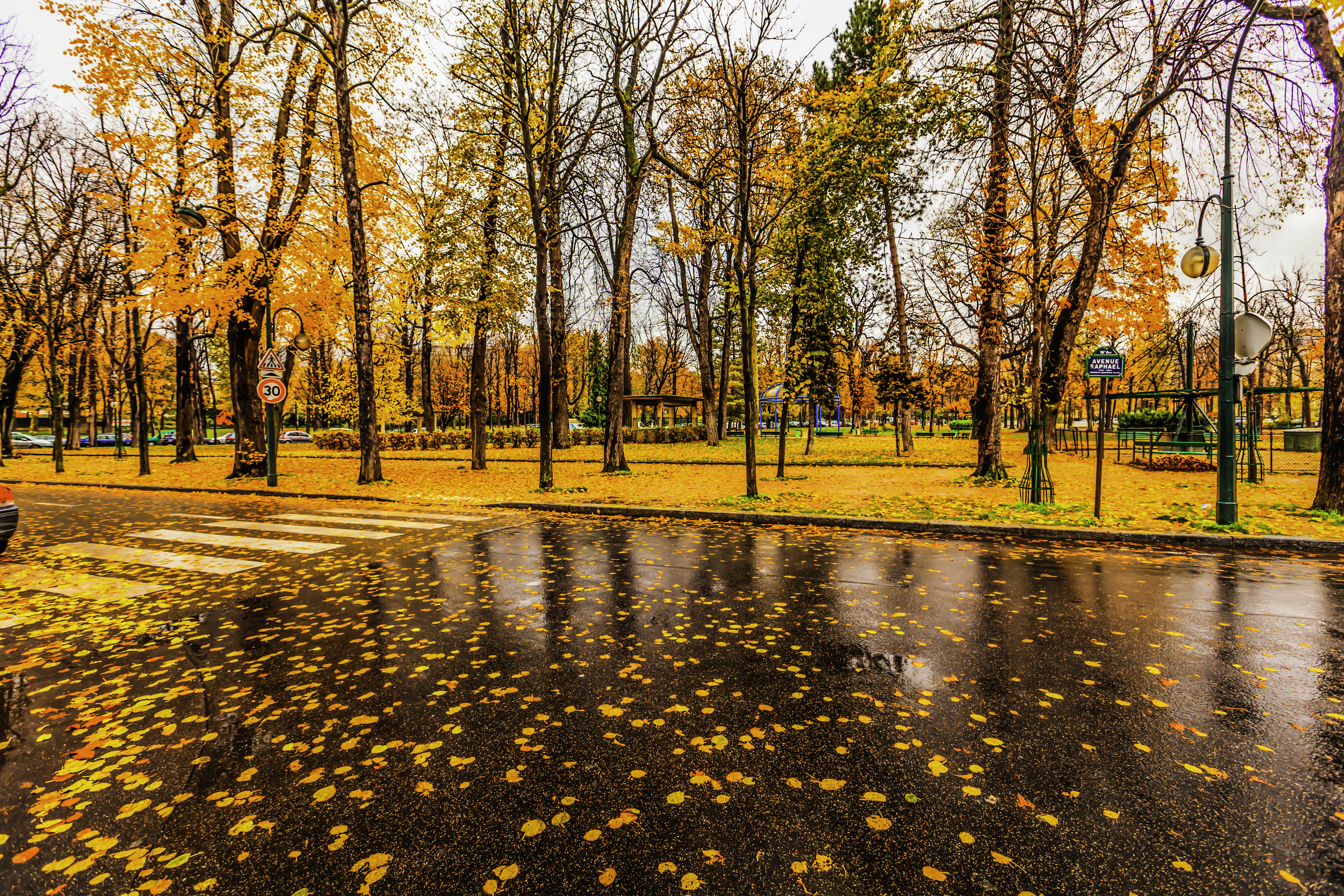
Autumn in Avenue Raphaël, Paris

Paris has an oceanic climate (Köppen: Cfb), typical of western Europe. This climate type features cool winters and warm summers, with average temperatures between 15 and 25 °C (59 and 77 °F) in July. Each year there are a few days when the temperature rises above 32 °C (90 °F). Longer periods of more intense heat sometimes occur, such as the heat wave of 2003, when temperatures exceeded 30 °C (86 °F) for weeks, reached 40 °C (104 °F) on some days, and rarely cooled down at night.

The weather in spring and autumn is generally mild during the day and cool at night, but is unstable. In winter, sunshine is scarce, days are cool, and nights are cold but generally above freezing, with low temperatures around 3 °C (37 °F). Light night frosts are quite common, but the temperature seldom dips below −5 °C (23 °F). Paris sometimes sees light snow or flurries with or without accumulation. In summer, the weather is warm, averaging 22 °C (72 °F), and there is 8 hours of sunshine on average per day.

Paris has an average annual precipitation of 641 mm (25.2 in), and experiences light rainfall distributed evenly throughout the year. As of 2025, the highest recorded temperature was 42.6 °C (108.7 °F), on 25 July 2019. The lowest was −23.9 °C (−11.0 °F), on 10 December 1879.

Climate data for Paris (Parc Montsouris), elevation: 75 m (246 ft), 1991–2020 normals, extremes 1872–present
Month	Jan	Feb	Mar	Apr	May	Jun	Jul	Aug	Sep	Oct	Nov	Dec	Year
Record high °C (°F)	16.1 (61.0)	21.4 (70.5)	26.0 (78.8)	30.2 (86.4)	34.8 (94.6)	40.6 (105.1)	42.6 (108.7)	39.5 (103.1)	36.2 (97.2)	28.9 (84.0)	21.6 (70.9)	17.1 (62.8)	42.6 (108.7)
Mean daily maximum °C (°F)	7.6 (45.7)	8.8 (47.8)	12.8 (55.0)	16.6 (61.9)	20.2 (68.4)	23.4 (74.1)	25.7 (78.3)	25.6 (78.1)	21.5 (70.7)	16.5 (61.7)	11.1 (52.0)	8.0 (46.4)	16.5 (61.7)
Daily mean °C (°F)	5.4 (41.7)	6.0 (42.8)	9.2 (48.6)	12.2 (54.0)	15.6 (60.1)	18.8 (65.8)	20.9 (69.6)	20.8 (69.4)	17.2 (63.0)	13.2 (55.8)	8.7 (47.7)	5.9 (42.6)	12.8 (55.0)
Mean daily minimum °C (°F)	3.2 (37.8)	3.3 (37.9)	5.6 (42.1)	7.9 (46.2)	11.1 (52.0)	14.2 (57.6)	16.2 (61.2)	16.0 (60.8)	13.0 (55.4)	9.9 (49.8)	6.2 (43.2)	3.8 (38.8)	9.2 (48.6)
Record low °C (°F)	−14.6 (5.7)	−14.7 (5.5)	−9.1 (15.6)	−3.5 (25.7)	−0.1 (31.8)	3.1 (37.6)	6.0 (42.8)	6.3 (43.3)	1.8 (35.2)	−3.8 (25.2)	−14.0 (6.8)	−23.9 (−11.0)	−23.9 (−11.0)
Average precipitation mm (inches)	47.6 (1.87)	41.8 (1.65)	45.2 (1.78)	45.8 (1.80)	69.0 (2.72)	51.3 (2.02)	59.4 (2.34)	58.0 (2.28)	44.7 (1.76)	55.2 (2.17)	54.3 (2.14)	62.0 (2.44)	634.3 (24.97)
Average precipitation days (≥ 1.0 mm)	9.9	9.1	9.5	8.6	9.2	8.3	7.4	8.1	7.5	9.5	10.4	11.4	108.9
Average snowy days	3.0	3.9	1.6	0.6	0.0	0.0	0.0	0.0	0.0	0.0	0.7	2.1	11.9
Average relative humidity (%)	83	78	73	69	70	69	68	71	76	82	84	84	76
Mean monthly sunshine hours	59.0	83.7	134.9	177.3	201.0	203.5	222.4	215.3	174.7	118.6	69.8	56.9	1,717
Percentage possible sunshine	22	29	37	43	43	42	46	48	46	35	25	22	37
Average ultraviolet index	1	2	3	4	6	7	7	6	4	3	1	1	4
Source 1: Meteo France (snow days 1981–2010), Infoclimat.fr (relative humidity 1961–1990)
Source 2: Weather Atlas (percent sunshine and UV Index)

== Administration ==
=== City government ===
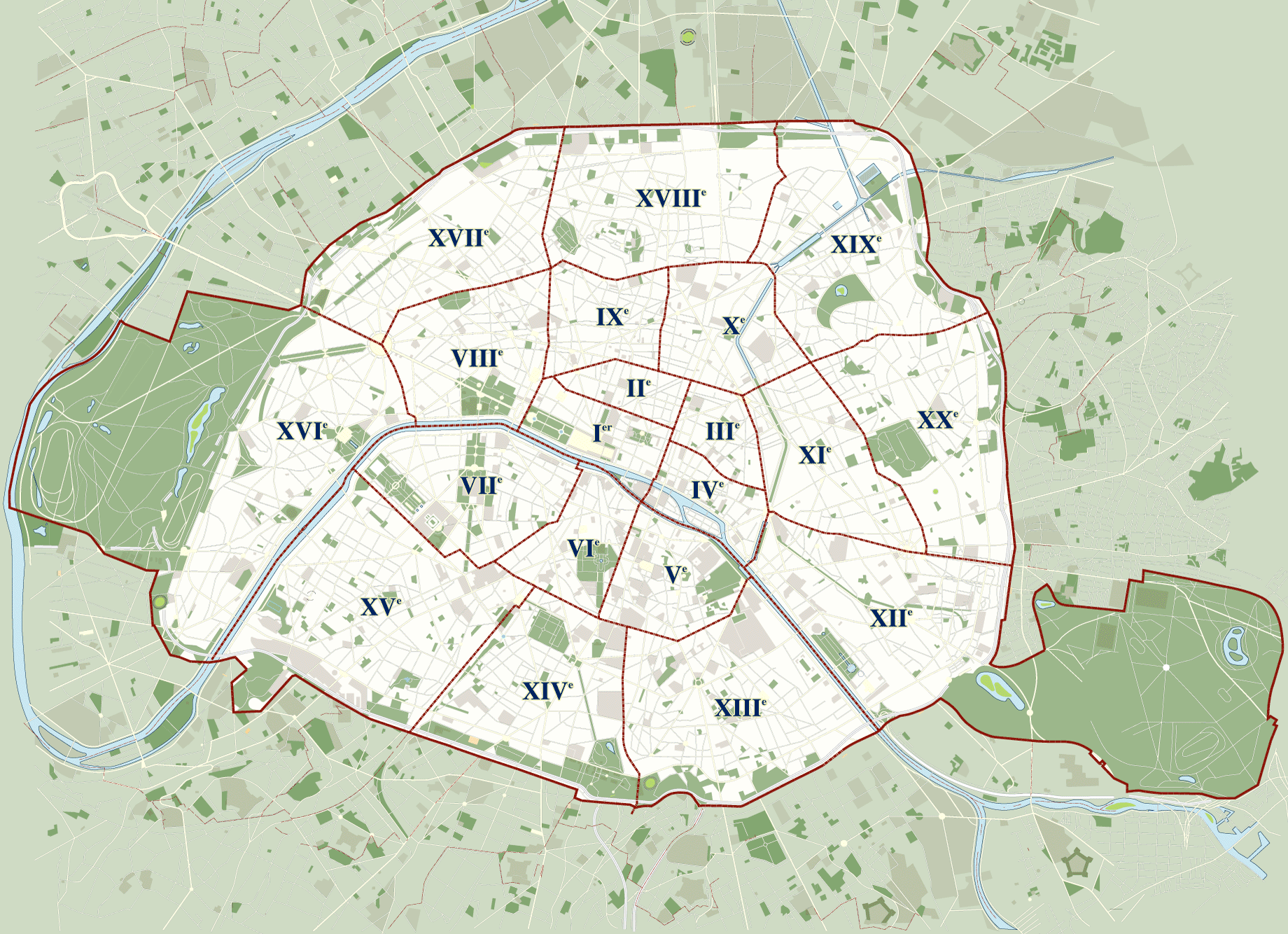
A map of the arrondissements of Paris

For almost all of its long history, except for a few brief periods, Paris was governed directly by representatives of the king, emperor, or president of France. In 1974, Paris was granted municipal autonomy by the National Assembly. The first modern elected mayor of Paris was Jacques Chirac, elected in March 1977, becoming the city's first mayor since 1871 and only the fourth since 1794. The current mayor is Emmanuel Grégoire, a member of the Socialist Party, who was elected in 2026.

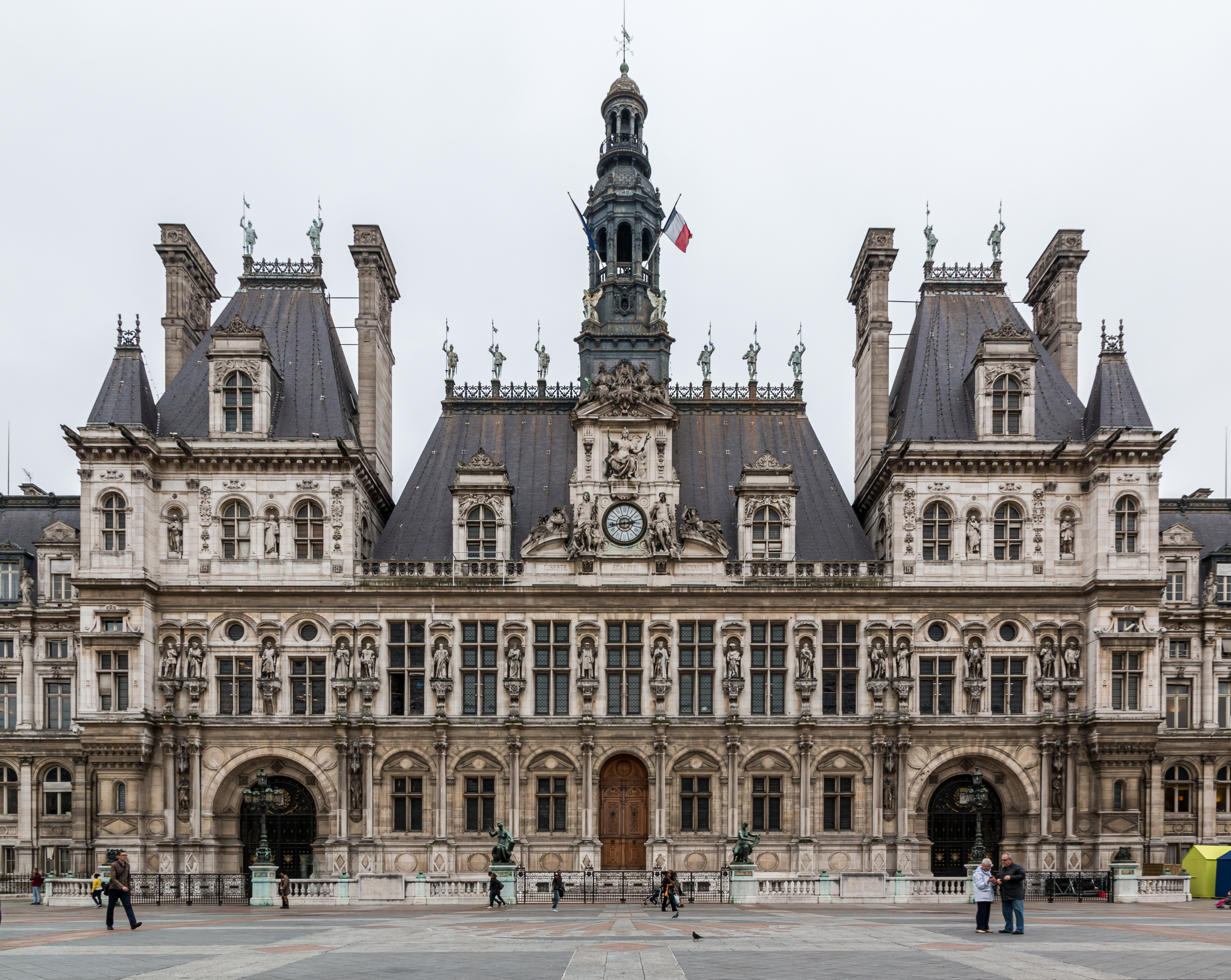
The Hôtel de Ville, or city hall

The mayor of Paris is elected indirectly by Paris voters. The voters of each of the city's 20 arrondissements elect members to the Conseil de Paris (Council of Paris), which elects the mayor. The council is composed of 163 members. Each arrondissement is allocated a number of seats proportional to its population, from 10 members for each of the least-populated arrondissements to 34 members for the most populated. The council is elected using closed list proportional representation in a two-round system.

Party lists winning an absolute majority in the first round – or at least a plurality in the second round – automatically win half the seats of an arrondissement. The remaining half of the seats are distributed proportionally to all lists which win at least 5% of the vote, using the highest averages method. This ensures that the winning party or coalition always wins a majority of the seats, even if they do not win an absolute majority of the vote.

Before the 2020 Paris municipal election, each of Paris's 20 arrondissements had its own town hall and a directly elected council (conseil d'arrondissement), which elects an arrondissement mayor. The council of each arrondissement is composed of members of the Conseil de Paris, and members who serve only on the council of the arrondissement. The number of deputy mayors in each arrondissement varies depending on its population. As of 1996, there were 20 arrondissement mayors and 120 deputy mayors. The creation of Paris Centre, a unified administrative division with a single mayor covering the first four arrondissements, took effect with the said 2020 election. The other 16 arrondissements continue to have their own mayors.

=== Métropole du Grand Paris ===
A map of the Greater Paris Metropolis and its governing territories

In January 2016, the Métropole du Grand Paris came into existence. It is an administrative structure for co-operation between the City of Paris and its nearest suburbs. It includes the City of Paris, plus the communes of the three departments of the inner suburbs, Hauts-de-Seine, Seine-Saint-Denis and Val-de-Marne, plus seven communes in the outer suburbs, including Argenteuil in Val d'Oise and Paray-Vieille-Poste in Essonne, which were added to include the major airports of Paris. The Metropole covers 814 km^{2} (314 sq mi). In 2015, it had a population of 6.945 million people.

The new structure is administered by a Metropolitan Council of 210 members, not directly elected, but chosen by the councils of the member Communes. By 2020, its basic competencies will include urban planning, housing, and protection of the environment. In January 2016, Patrick Ollier was elected the first president of the metropolitan council. Though the Metropole has a population of nearly seven million people and accounts for 25 percent of the GDP of France, it has a very small budget: just 65 million Euros, compared with eight billion Euros for the City of Paris.

=== Regional government ===
The Region of Île de France, including Paris and its surrounding communities, is governed by the Regional Council, composed of 209 members representing the different communes. In December 2015, a list of candidates of the Union of the Right, a coalition of centrist and right-wing parties, led by Valérie Pécresse, narrowly won the regional election, defeating a coalition of Socialists and ecologists. The Socialists had governed the region for seventeen years. The regional council has 121 members from the Union of the Right, 66 from the Union of the Left and 22 from the extreme right National Front.

=== National government ===
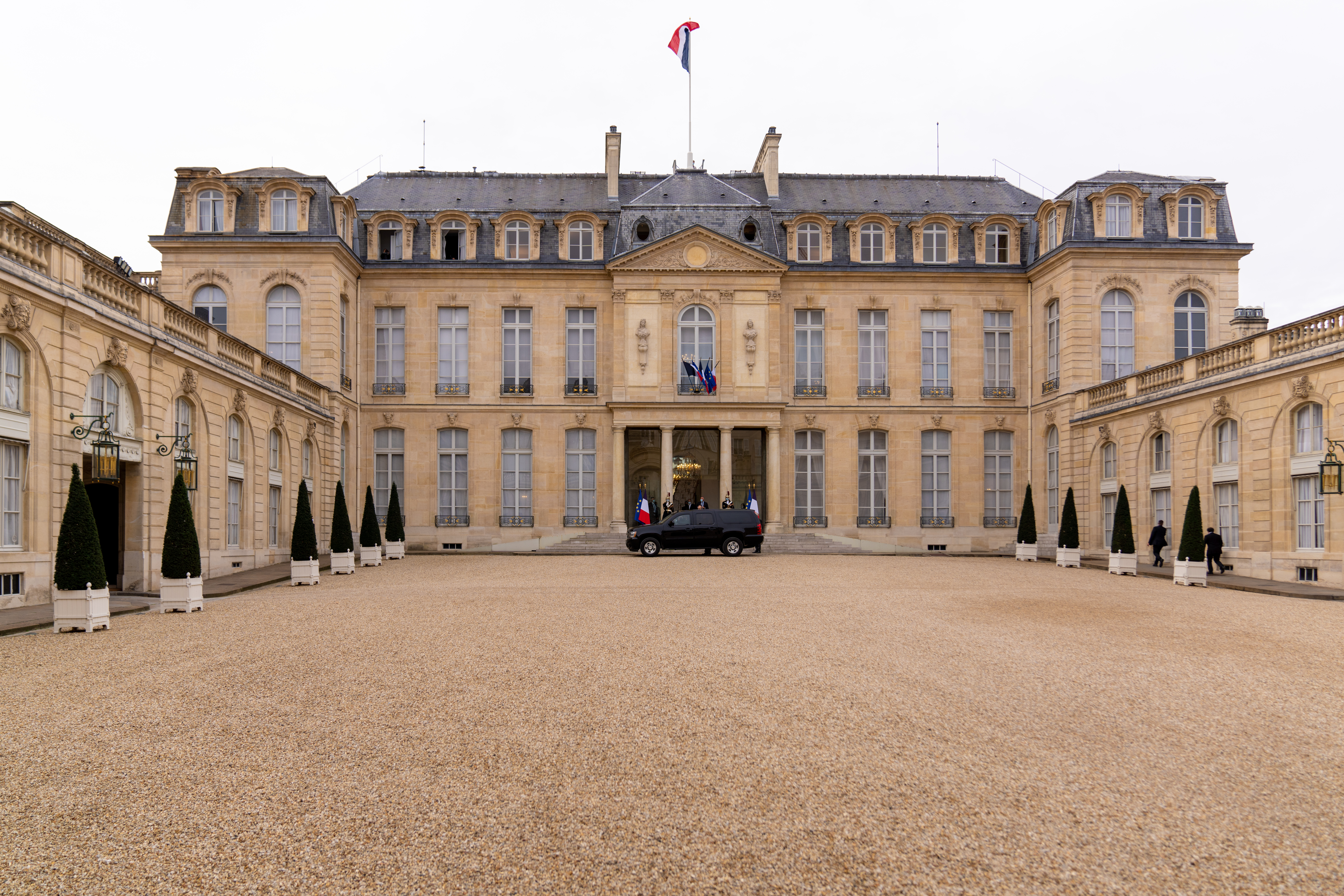
The Élysée Palace, official residence of the President of France

As the capital of France, Paris is the seat of France's national government. For the executive, the two chief officers each have their own official residences, which also serve as their offices. The President of the French Republic resides at the Élysée Palace. The Prime Minister's seat is at the Hôtel Matignon. Government ministries are located in various parts of the city, many near the Hôtel Matignon.

Both houses of the French Parliament are located on the Rive Gauche. The upper house, the Senate, meets in the Palais du Luxembourg. The more important lower house, the National Assembly, meets in the Palais Bourbon. The President of the Senate, the second-highest public official in France, with the President of the Republic being the sole superior, resides in the Petit Luxembourg, a smaller palace annexe to the Palais du Luxembourg.

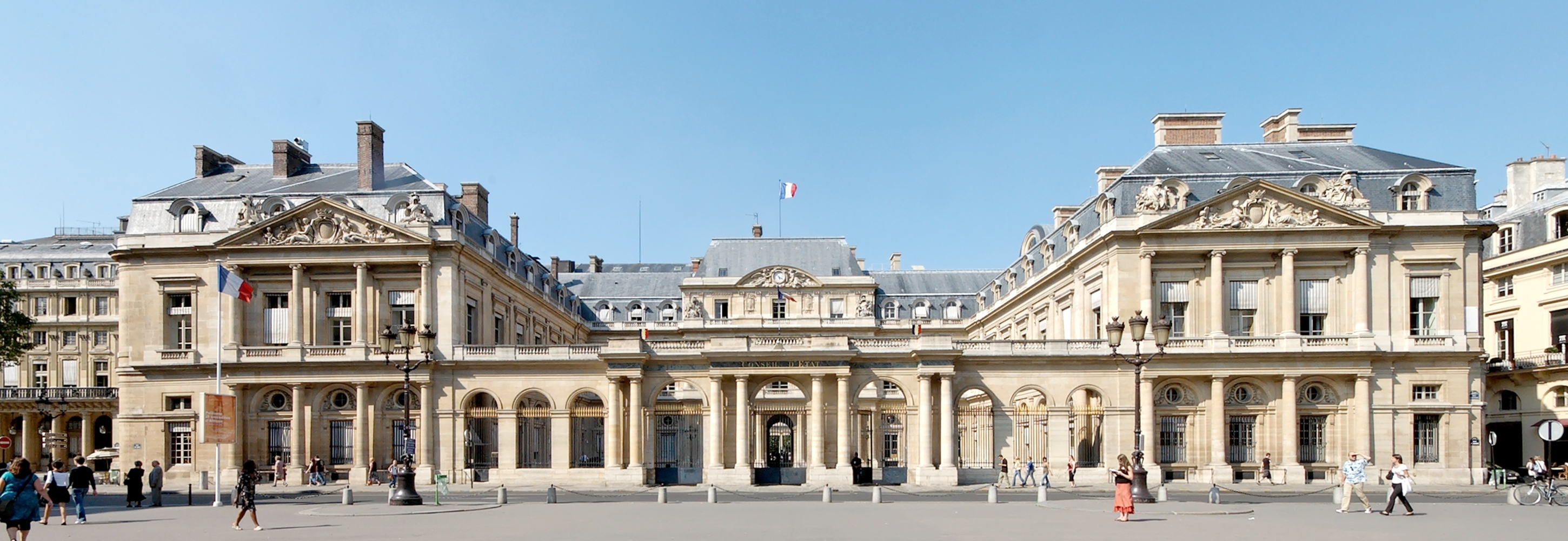
The Palais-Royal, residence of the Conseil d'État

France's highest courts are located in Paris. The Court of Cassation, the highest court in the judicial order, which reviews criminal and civil cases, is located in the Palais de Justice on the Île de la Cité. The Conseil d'État, which provides legal advice to the executive and acts as the highest court in the administrative order, judging litigation against public bodies, is located in the Palais-Royal in the 1st arrondissement. The Constitutional Council, an advisory body with ultimate authority on the constitutionality of laws and government decrees, meets in the Montpensier wing of the Palais Royal.

Paris and its region host the headquarters of several international organisations, including UNESCO, the Organisation for Economic Co-operation and Development, the International Chamber of Commerce, the Paris Club, the European Space Agency, the International Energy Agency, the Organisation internationale de la Francophonie, the European Union Institute for Security Studies, the International Bureau of Weights and Measures, the International Exhibition Bureau, and the International Federation for Human Rights.

=== Police force ===
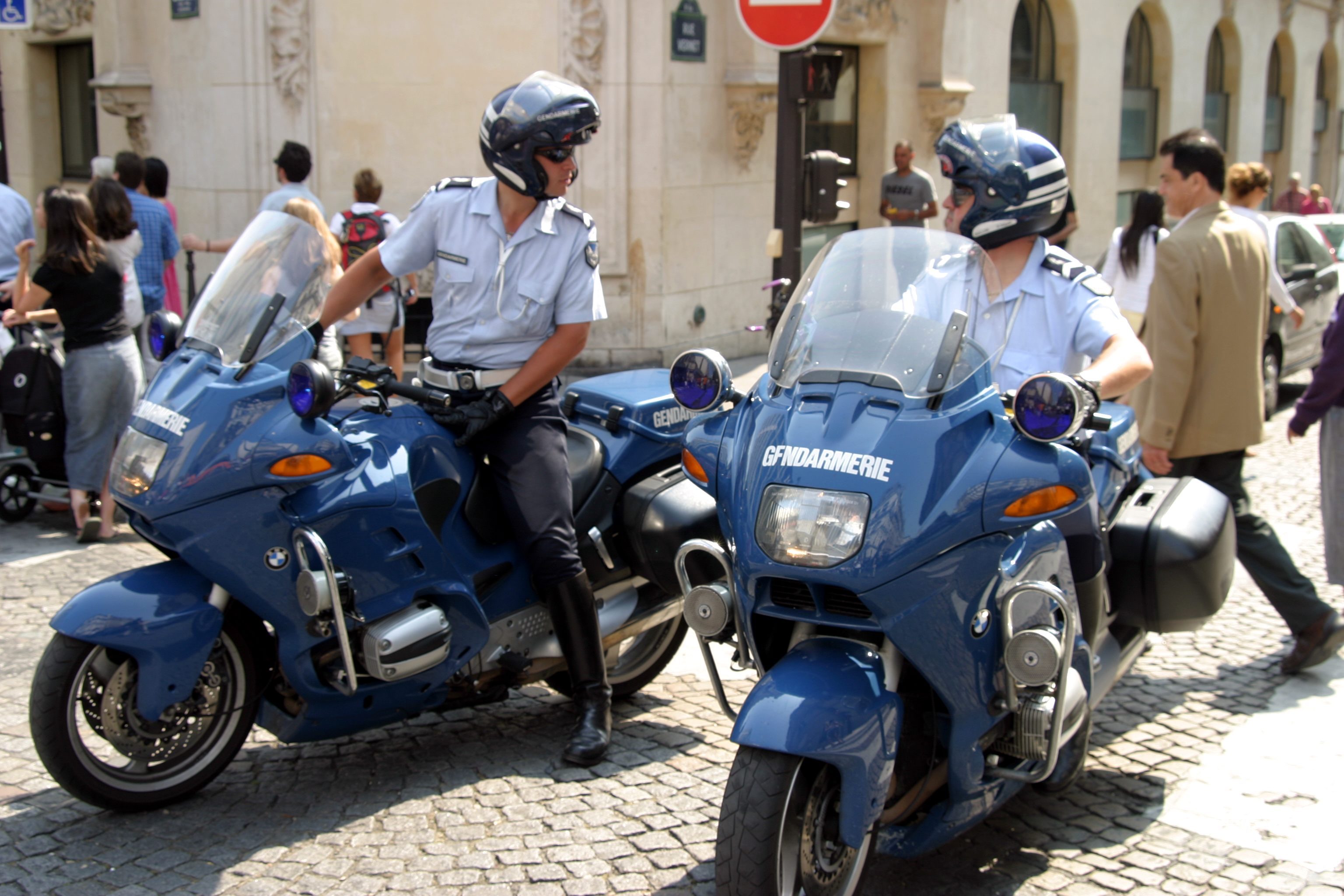
Gendarmerie motorcyclists

The security of Paris is mainly the responsibility of the Prefecture of Police of Paris, a subdivision of the Ministry of the Interior. It supervises the units of the National Police who patrol the city and the three neighbouring departments. It is also responsible for providing emergency services, including the Paris Fire Brigade. Its headquarters is on Place Louis Lépine on the Île de la Cité.

There are 43,800 officers under the prefecture, and a fleet of more than 6,000 vehicles, including police cars, motorcycles, fire trucks, boats, and helicopters. The national police has its own special unit for riot control and crowd control, and security of public buildings, called the Compagnies Républicaines de Sécurité (CRS). Vans of CRS agents are frequently seen in the centre of Paris when there are demonstrations and public events. The police are supported by the National Gendarmerie, a branch of the French Armed Forces. Their police operations are supervised by the Ministry of the Interior.

Crime in Paris is similar to that in most large cities. Violent crime is relatively rare in the city centre. Political violence is uncommon, though very large demonstrations may occur in Paris and other French cities simultaneously. These demonstrations, usually managed by a strong police presence, can turn confrontational and escalate into violence.

== Cityscape ==
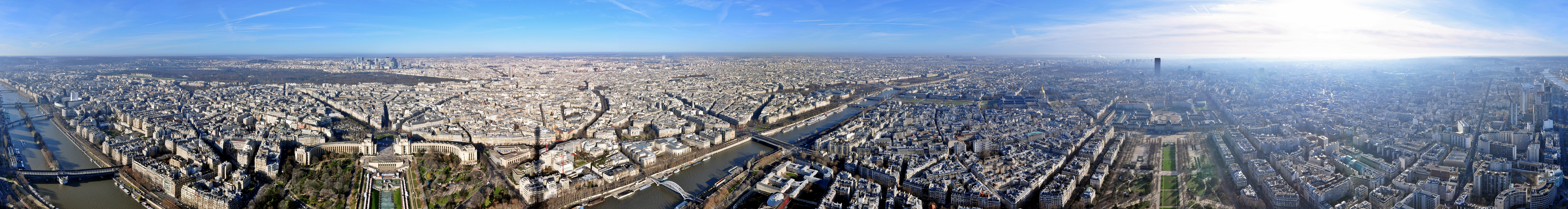
A panorama of Paris from the Eiffel Tower, in a 360-degree view. The Seine river flows from the north-east to the south-west, right to left

=== Urbanism and architecture ===
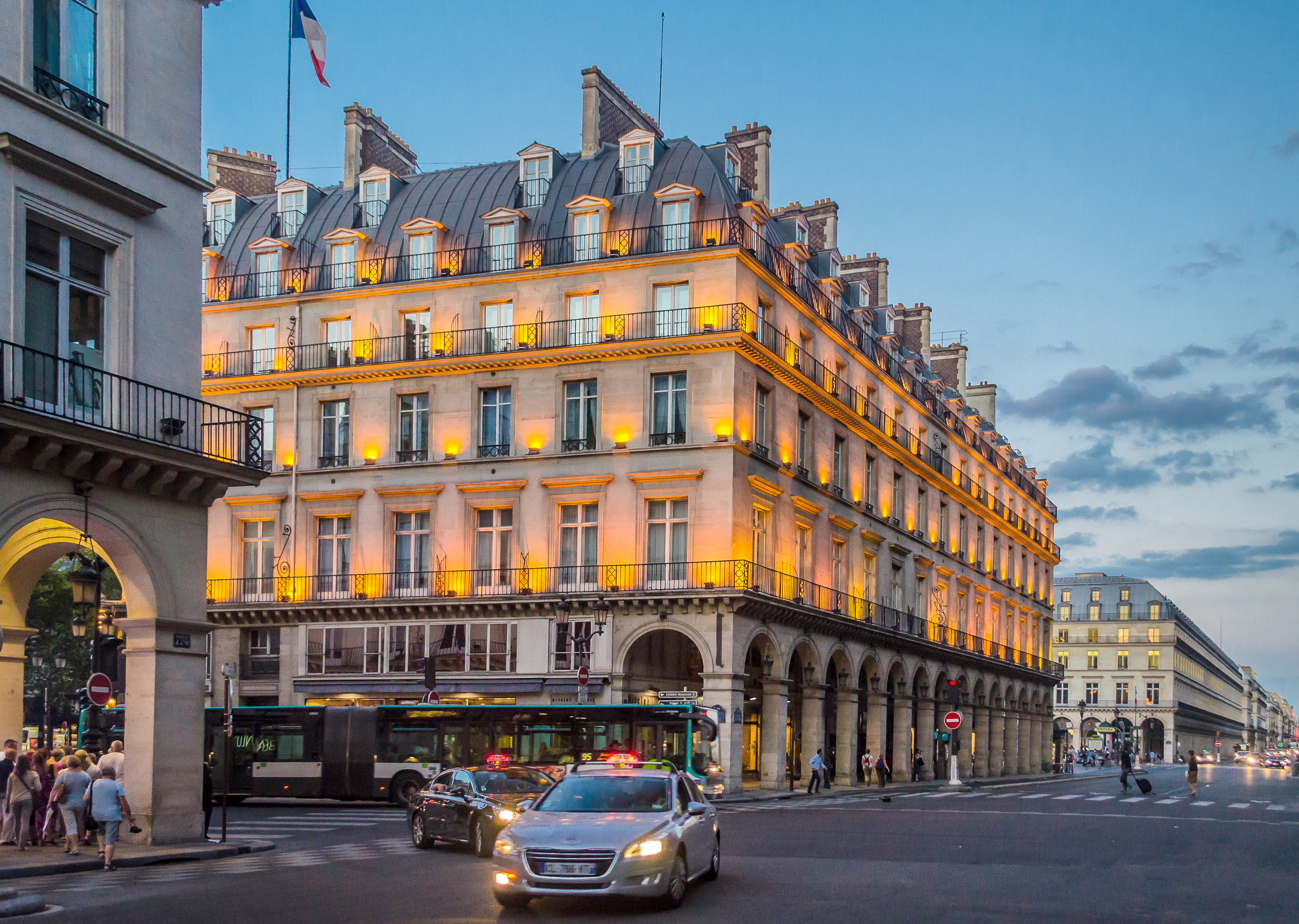
The Rue de Rivoli

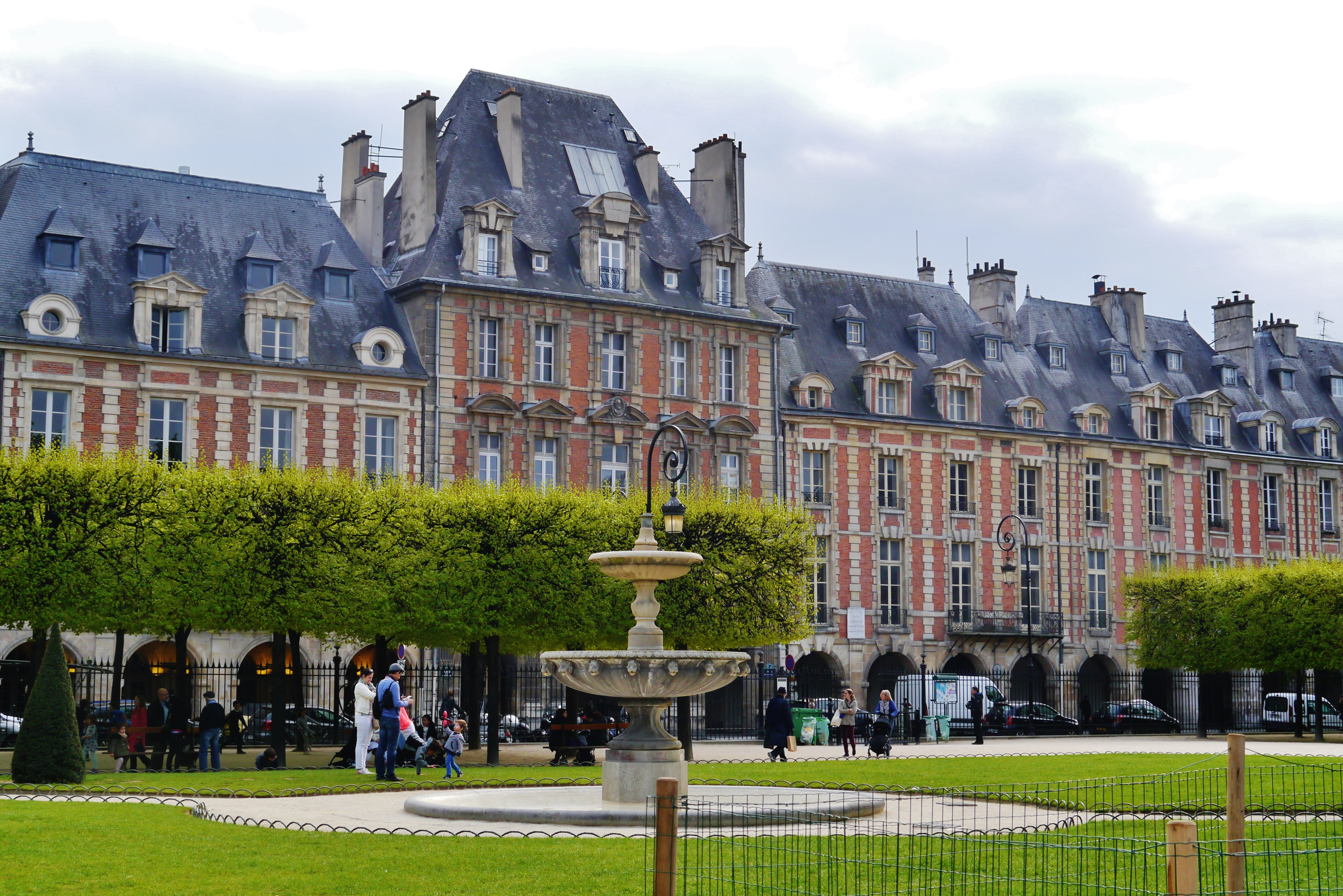
The Place des Vosges, the oldest planned square in Paris

Paris is one of the few world capitals that has rarely seen destruction by catastrophe or war. As a result, even its earliest history is visible in its street map, and centuries of rulers adding their respective architectural marks on the capital have resulted in an accumulated wealth of history-rich monuments and buildings whose beauty plays a large part in giving Paris the reputation it has today. At its origin, before the Middle Ages, Paris was composed of several islands and sandbanks in a bend of the Seine. Of those, two remain today: Île Saint-Louis and the Île de la Cité. A third one is the 1827 artificially created Île aux Cygnes.

Modern Paris owes much of its downtown plan and architectural harmony to Napoleon III and his Prefect of the Seine, Baron Haussmann. Between 1853 and 1870 they rebuilt the city centre, created the wide downtown boulevards and squares where the boulevards intersected, imposed standard facades along the boulevards, and required that the facades be built of the distinctive cream-grey "Paris stone". They built the major parks around central Paris. The high residential population of the city centre makes Paris much different from most other major western cities.

Paris's urbanism laws have been under strict control since the early 17th century, particularly where street-front alignment, building height and building distribution is concerned. The 210 m (690 ft) Tour Montparnasse was both Paris's and France's tallest building from 1973 until 2011, when the record was taken by the La Défense district's Tour First in the commune of Courbevoie.

=== Housing ===
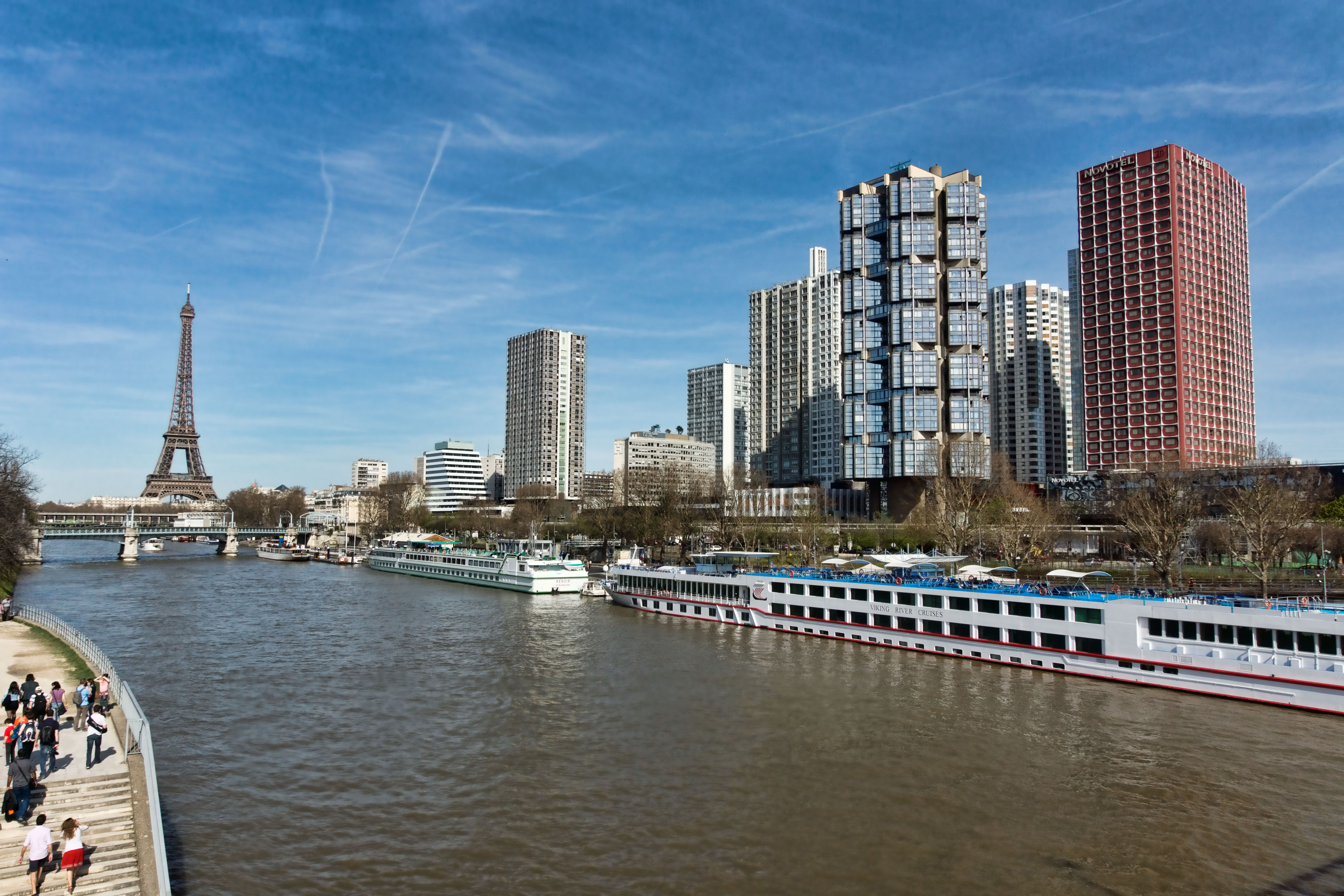
Front de Seine development along the river Seine

In 2018, the most expensive residential street in Paris by average price per square metre was Avenue Montaigne, at 22,372 euros per square metre. In 2011, the number of residences in the City of Paris was 1,356,074. Among these, 1,165,541 (85.9 percent) were main residences, 91,835 (6.8 percent) were secondary residences, and the remaining 7.3 percent were empty.

Sixty-two percent of buildings date from 1949 and before, with 20 percent built between 1949 and 1974. 18 percent of Paris buildings were built after 1974. Two-thirds of the city's 1.3 million residences are studio and two-room apartments. Paris averages 1.9 people per residence, a number that has remained constant since the 1980s, which is less than Île-de-France's 2.33 people-per-residence average. Only 33 percent of Parisian principal residents own their habitation, against 47 percent for the wider Île-de-France region. Most of Paris's population rents their residence. In 2017, social or public housing was 19.9 percent of Paris's residences. Its distribution varies widely throughout Paris, from 2.6 percent of the housing in the wealthy 7th arrondissement to 39.9 percent in the 19th arrondissement.

In February 2019, a Paris NGO conducted its annual citywide count of homeless persons. They counted 3,641 homeless persons in Paris, of whom twelve percent were women. More than half had been homeless for more than a year. 2,885 were living in the streets or parks, 298 in train and metro stations, and 756 in other forms of temporary shelter. This was an increase of 588 persons since 2018.

=== Suburbs ===
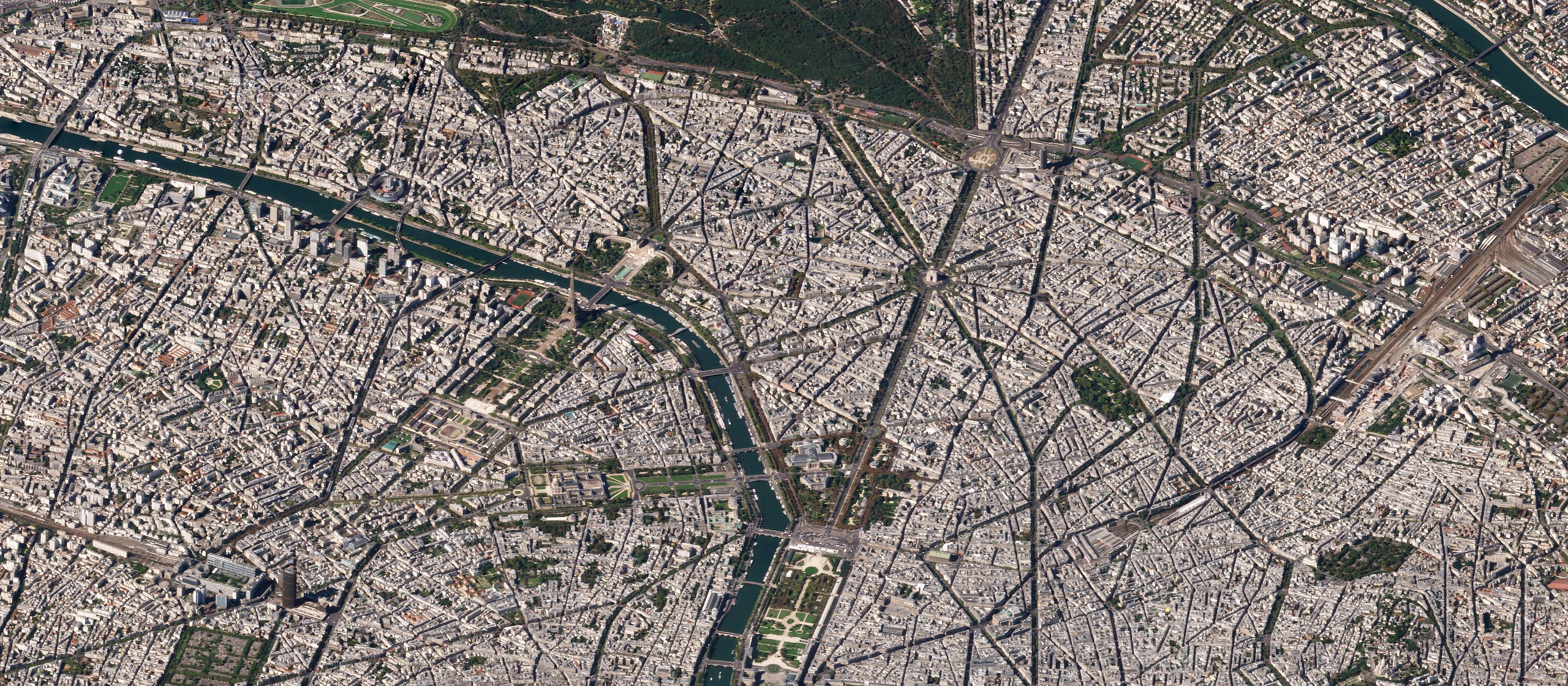
Western Paris in 2016, photographed by a SkySat satellite

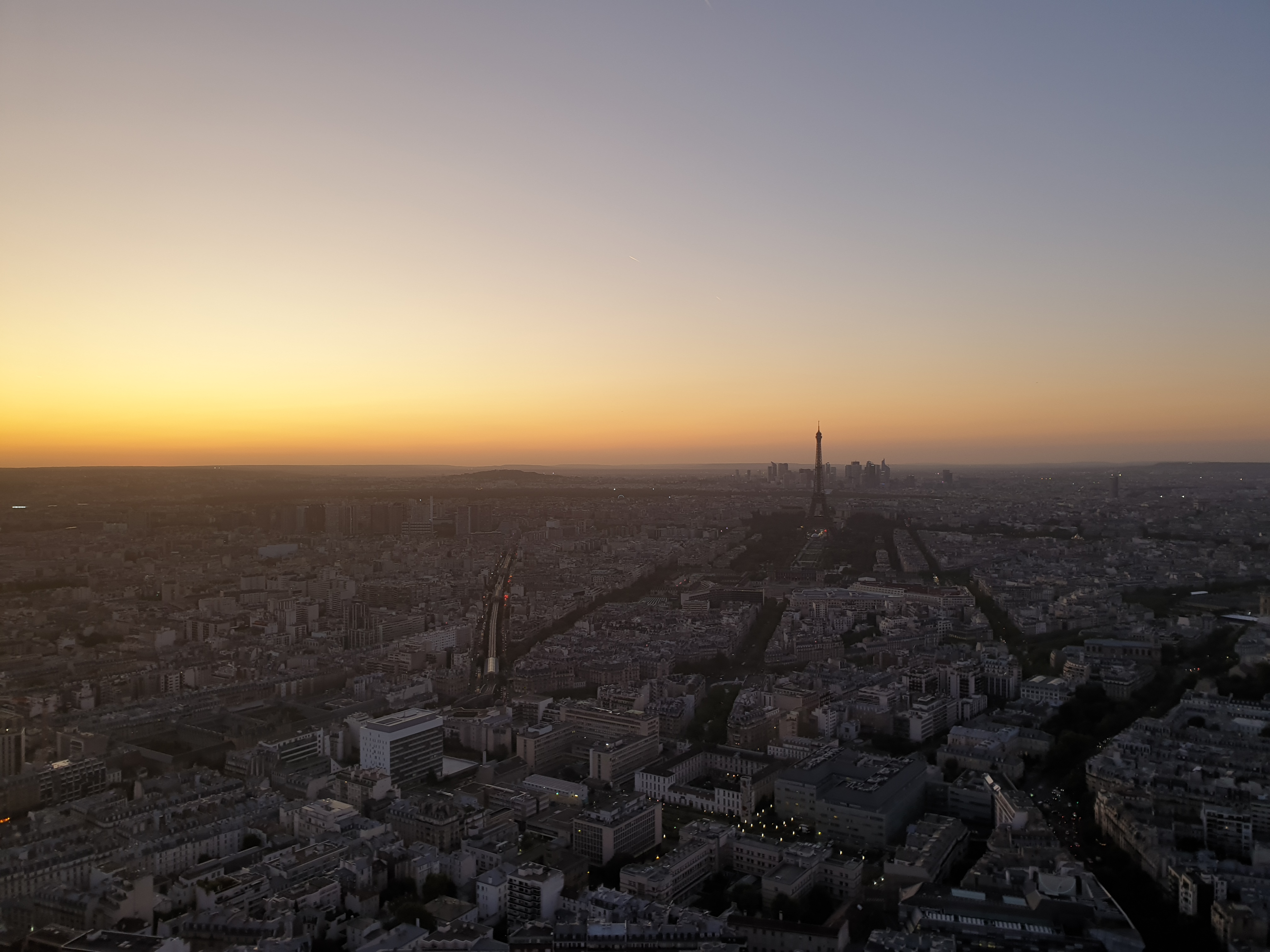
West of Paris seen from Tour Montparnasse, 2019

Aside from the 20th-century addition of the Bois de Boulogne, the Bois de Vincennes, and the Paris heliport, Paris's administrative limits have remained unchanged since 1860. A greater administrative Seine department had been governing Paris and its suburbs since its creation in 1790, but the rising suburban population had made it difficult to maintain as a unique entity. To address this problem, the parent "District de la région parisienne" ('district of the Paris region') was reorganised into several new departments from 1968: Paris became a department in itself, and the administration of its suburbs was divided between the three new departments surrounding it. The district of the Paris region was renamed "Île-de-France" in 1977, but this abbreviated "Paris region" name is still commonly used today to describe the Île-de-France, and as a vague reference to the entire Paris agglomeration. Long-intended measures to unite Paris with its suburbs began in January 2016, when the Métropole du Grand Paris came into existence.

Paris's disconnect with its suburbs, its lack of suburban transportation, in particular, became all too apparent with the Paris agglomeration's growth. Paul Delouvrier promised to resolve the Paris-suburbs mésentente when he became head of the Paris region in 1961. Two of his most ambitious projects for the Region were the construction of five suburban "villes nouvelles" ("new cities") and the RER commuter train network.

Many other suburban residential districts (grands ensembles) were built between the 1960s and 1970s to provide a low-cost solution for a rapidly expanding population. These districts were socially mixed at first, but few residents actually owned their homes. The growing economy made these accessible to the middle classes only from the 1970s. Their poor construction quality and their haphazard insertion into existing urban growth contributed to their desertion by those able to move elsewhere, and their repopulation by those with more limited resources.

These areas, quartiers sensibles ("sensitive quarters"), are in northern and eastern Paris, namely around its Goutte d'Or and Belleville neighbourhoods. To the north of Paris, they are grouped mainly in the Seine-Saint-Denis department, and to a lesser extent, to the east in the Val-d'Oise department. Other difficult areas are located in the Seine valley, in Évry et Corbeil-Essonnes (Essonne), in Mureaux, Mantes-la-Jolie (Yvelines), and scattered among social housing districts created by Delouvrier's 1961 "ville nouvelle" political initiative.

The Paris agglomeration's urban sociology is basically that of 19th-century Paris: the wealthy live in the west and southwest, and the middle-to-working classes are in the north and east. The remaining areas are mostly middle-class, dotted with wealthy islands in areas of historical importance, namely Saint-Maur-des-Fossés to the east and Enghien-les-Bains to the north of Paris.

== Demographics ==
City of Paris population pyramid in 2022

2023 Census Paris Region
- (Île-de-France)
Country/territory of birth	Population
Metropolitan France	9,100,643
Algeria	364,869
Morocco	281,066
Portugal	214,430
Tunisia	151,900
(Ivory Coast) Côte d'Ivoire	83,671
Guadeloupe	79,711
Mali	77,876
China	76,529
Senegal	73,060
Martinique	72,470
Turkey	71,926
Italy	59,241
Cameroon	54,080
(Democratic Republic of the Congo) DR Congo	53,434
Romania	53,140
Sri Lanka	48,586
Republic of the Congo	47,877
Spain	43,509
Other countries/territories
Haiti	38,476
Vietnam	36,611
India	36,415
Poland	32,546
Lebanon	28,941
Cambodia	28,746
Réunion	28,095
Brazil	24,672
Guinea	24,360
Pakistan	23,554
Madagascar	23,417
Serbia	23,062
Russia	21,635
Germany	20,559
United States	19,663
Colombia	19,002
Mauritius	18,847
French Guiana	18,122
United Kingdom	17,890
Comoros	17,157
(United Nations) Other countries and territories	953,279

The population of the City of Paris was 2,102,650 in January 2023, down from 2,165,423 in January 2022. Between 2013 and 2023, the population fell by 122,919, or about five percent. The Mayor of Paris, Anne Hidalgo, declared that this illustrated the "de-densification" of the city, creating more green space and less crowding. Despite the drop, Paris remains the most densely populated city in Europe, with 252 residents per hectare, not counting parks. This drop was attributed partly to a lower birth rate, the departure of middle-class residents, and the possible loss of housing in Paris, due to short-term rentals for tourism.

Paris is the fourth largest municipality in the European Union, after Berlin, Madrid and Rome, and is the 34th most densely populated city in the world as of 2020. Eurostat places Paris (6.5 million people) behind London (8 million) and ahead of Berlin (3.5 million), based on the 2012 populations of what Eurostat calls "urban audit core cities". The population of Paris today is lower than its historical peak of 2.9 million in 1921. The principal reasons are a significant decline in household size and a dramatic migration of residents to the suburbs between 1962 and 1975. Factors in the migration included de-industrialisation, high rent, the gentrification of many inner quarters, the transformation of living space into offices, and greater affluence among working families. Paris's population loss came to a temporary halt at the beginning of the 21st century. The population increased from 2,125,246 in 1999 to 2,240,621 in 2012, before declining again between 2012 and 2023.

Paris is the core of a built-up area that extends well beyond its limits: commonly referred to as the agglomération Parisienne, and statistically as a unité urbaine (a measure of urban area), the Paris agglomeration's population of 11,013,774 in 2023 made it the largest urban area in the European Union. City-influenced commuter activity reaches further, in a statistical aire d'attraction de Paris, ("functional area", a statistical method comparable to a metropolitan area), that had a population of 13,320,752 in 2023, 19.6% of the population of France, and the largest metropolitan area in the Eurozone.

In 2012, the Commune of Paris was the most densely populated city in the European Union. There were 21,616 people per square kilometre within the city limits, the NUTS-3 statistical area, ahead of Inner London West, which had 10,374 people per square kilometre. In the same census, three departments bordering Paris, Hauts-de-Seine, Seine-Saint-Denis and Val-de-Marne, had population densities of over 10,000 people per square kilometre, ranking among the 10 most densely populated areas of the EU.

=== Migration ===
Under French law, people born in foreign countries with no French citizenship at birth are defined as immigrants. In the 2012 census, 135,853 residents of the City of Paris were immigrants from Europe, 112,369 were immigrants from the Maghreb, 70,852 from sub-Saharan Africa and Egypt, 5,059 from Turkey, 91,297 from Asia outside Turkey, 38,858 from the Americas, and 1,365 from the South Pacific.

In the Paris Region, 590,504 residents were immigrants from Europe, 627,078 were immigrants from the Maghreb, 435,339 from sub-Saharan Africa and Egypt, 69,338 from Turkey, 322,330 from Asia outside Turkey, 113,363 from the Americas, and 2,261 from the South Pacific.

The Paris Region is home to one of France's largest and historic Chinese communities, where roughly half of all 600,000 Chinese diaspora in France reside. The community was initially established by itinerant migrants from Qingtian in Zhejiang, but had since then grown to its present size with the continuous arrival of Chinese from Wenzhou, Indochina, Dongbei and a diverse range of other regions across the Chinese-speaking world.

In 2012, there were 8,810 British citizens and 10,019 United States citizens living in the City of Paris (Ville de Paris), and 20,466 British citizens and 16,408 United States citizens living in the entire Paris Region (Île-de-France).

In 2020–2021, about 6 million people, or 41% of the population of the Paris Region, were either immigrants (21%) or had at least one immigrant parent (20%). These figures do not include French people born in Overseas France and their direct descendants.

=== Religion ===
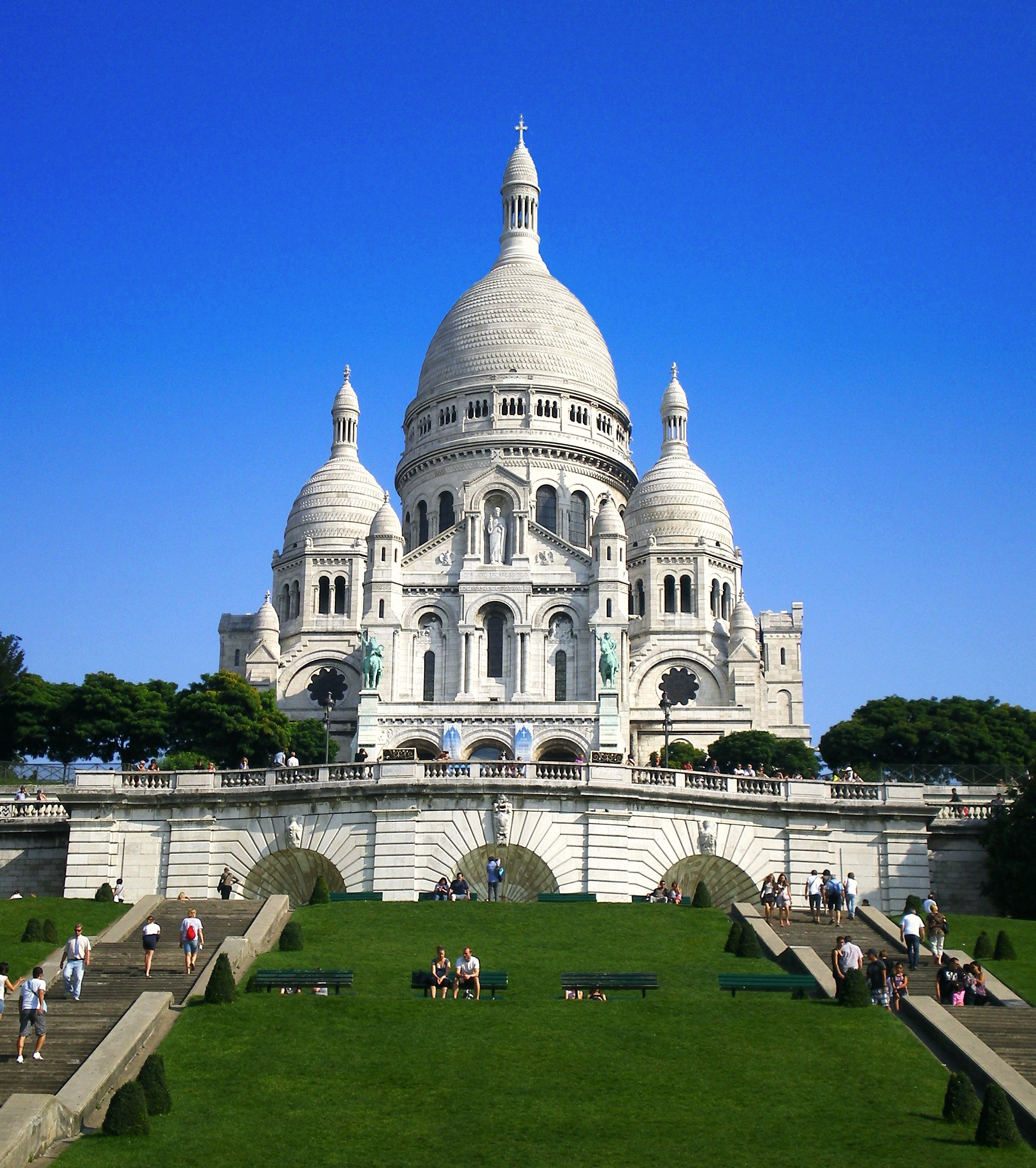
Sacré-Cœur in Montmartre

At the beginning of the twentieth century, Paris was the largest Catholic city in the world. French census data does not contain information about religious affiliation. In a 2011 survey by the Institut français d'opinion publique (IFOP), a French public opinion research organisation, 61 percent of residents of the Paris Region (Île-de-France) identified themselves as Roman Catholic. In the same survey, 7 percent of residents identified themselves as Muslims, 4 percent as Protestants, 2 percent as Jewish, and 25 percent as without religion.

In 2012 and 2013, it was estimated that there were almost 500,000 Muslims in the City of Paris.

In 2014, the Jewish population of the Paris Region was estimated to be 282,000, the largest concentration of Jews in the world outside of Israel and the United States.

== Economy ==
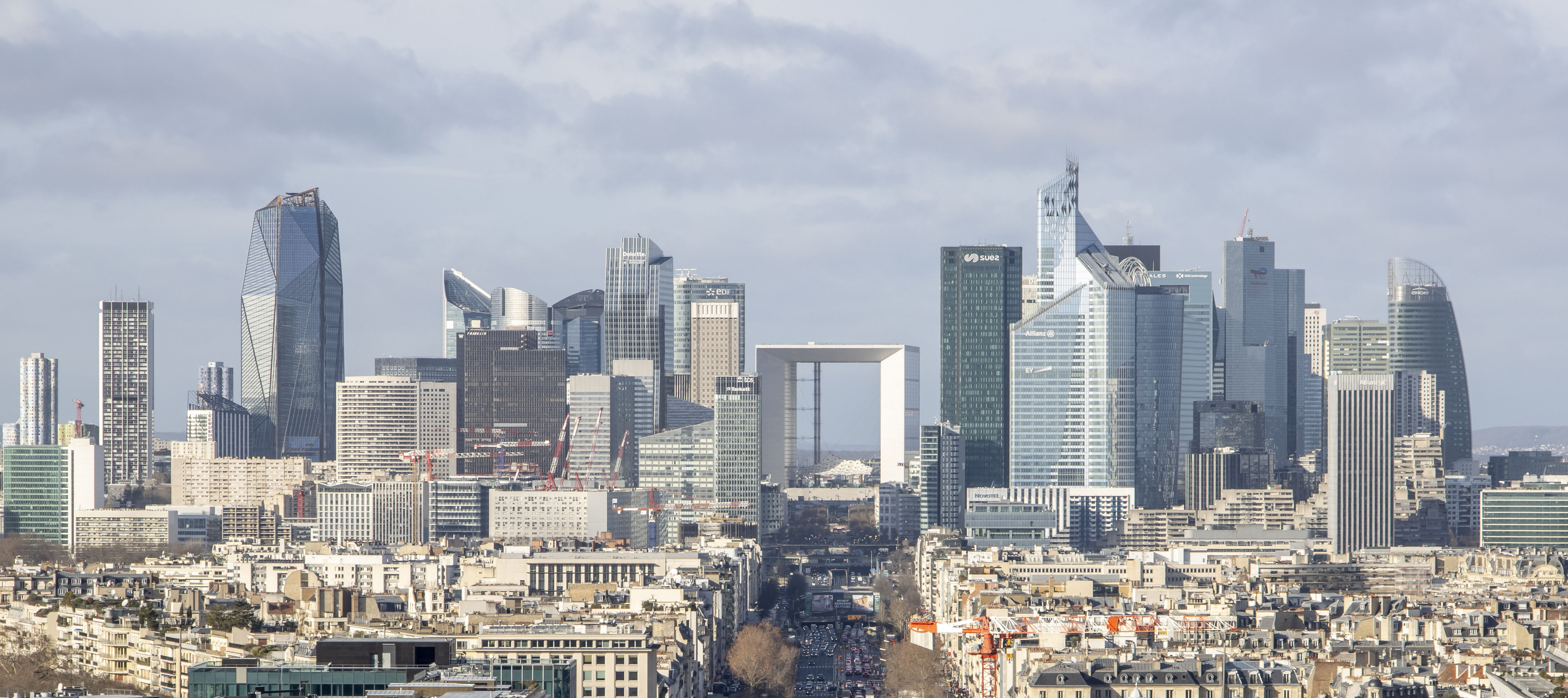
La Défense, the largest dedicated business district in Europe, located to the west of Paris

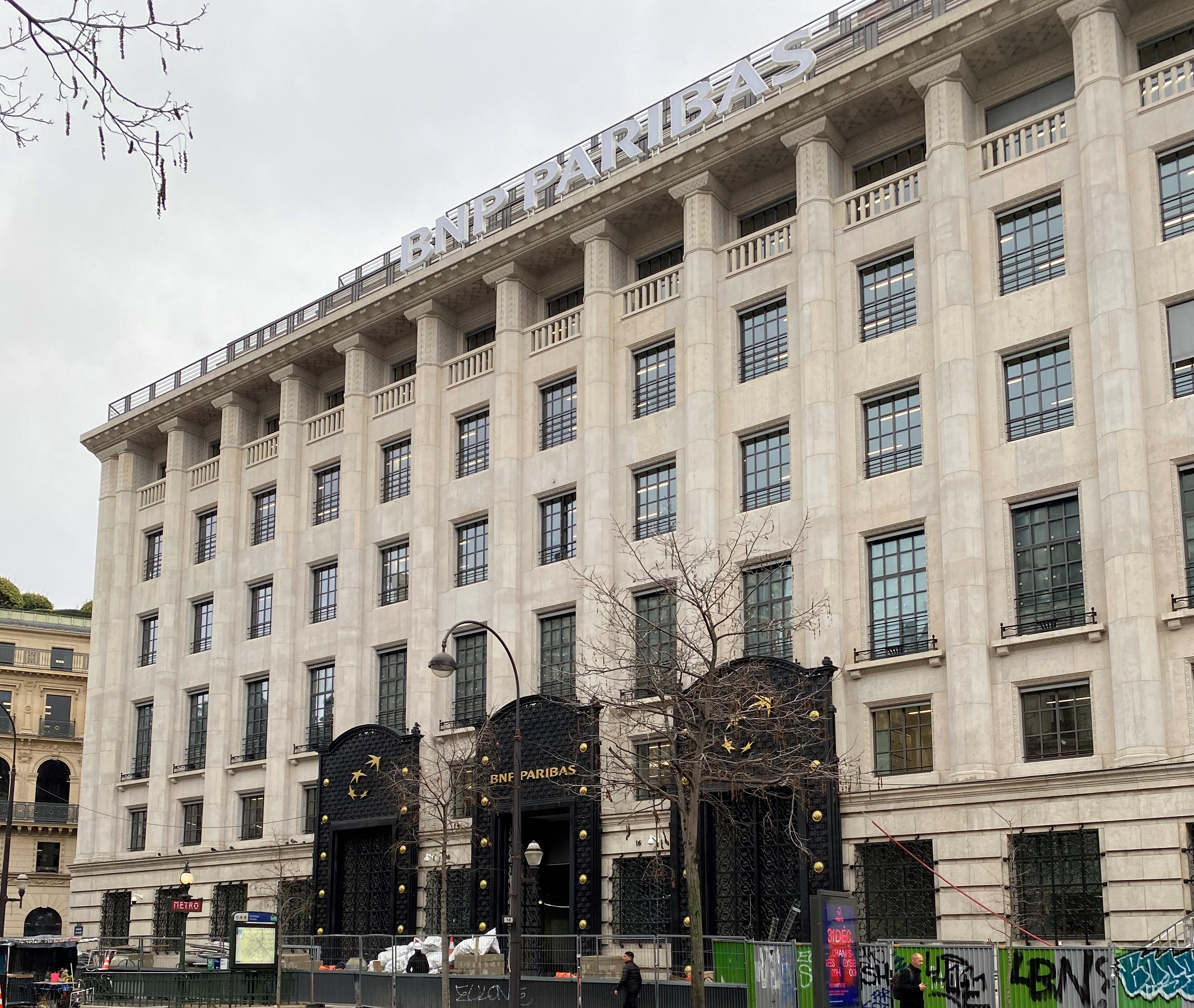
The headquarters of BNP Paribas, the largest banking group in Europe, in the Boulevard des Italiens

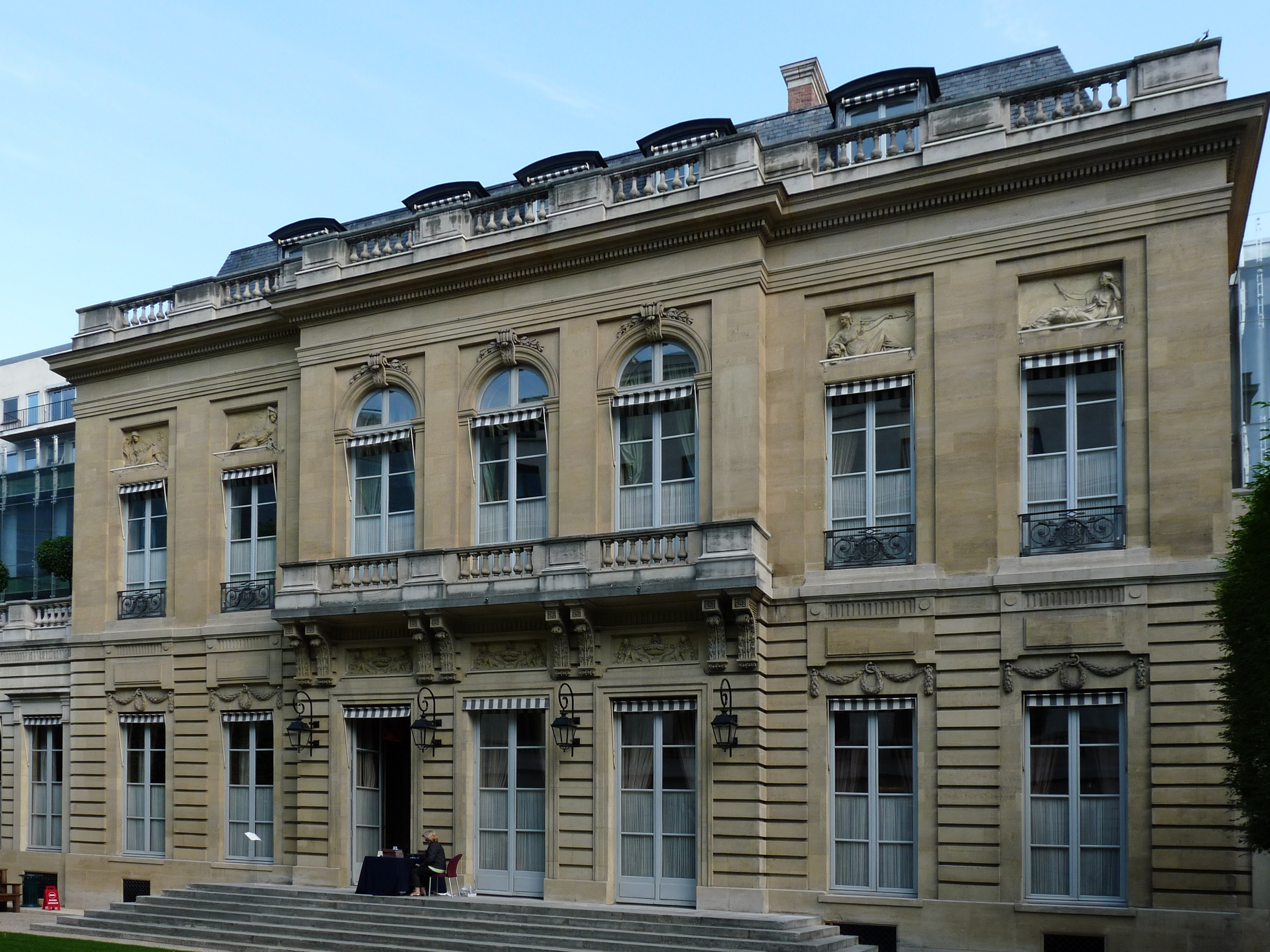
Axa headquarters at Hôtel de La Vaupalière

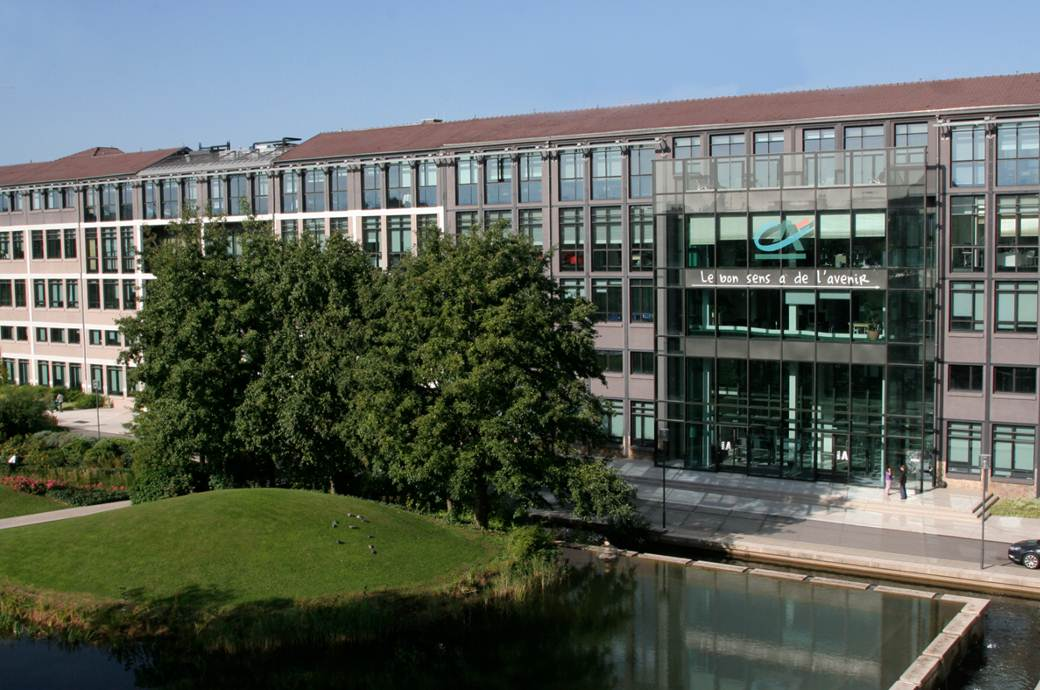
The Crédit Agricole headquarters in Montrouge, south of Paris

The economy of the City of Paris is based largely on services and commerce. Of the 390,480 enterprises in Paris, 80.6 percent are engaged in commerce, transportation, and diverse services, 6.5 percent in construction, and 3.8 percent in industry. The story is similar in the Paris Region (Île-de-France): 76.7 percent of enterprises are engaged in commerce and services, and 3.4 percent in industry.

At the 2012 census, 59.5% of jobs in the Paris Region were in market services (12.0% in wholesale and retail trade, 9.7% in professional, scientific, and technical services, 6.5% in information and communication, 6.5% in transportation and warehousing, 5.9% in finance and insurance, 5.8% in administrative and support services, 4.6% in accommodation and food services, and 8.5% in various other market services), 26.9% in non-market services (10.4% in human health and social work activities, 9.6% in public administration and defence, and 6.9% in education), 8.2% in manufacturing and utilities (6.6% in manufacturing and 1.5% in utilities), 5.2% in construction, and 0.2% in agriculture.

The Paris Region had 5.4 million salaried employees in 2010, of whom 2.2 million were concentrated in 39 pôles d'emplois or business districts. The largest of these by number of employees is known in French as the QCA, or quartier central des affaires. In 2010, it was the workplace of 500,000 salaried employees, about 30 percent of the salaried employees in Paris and 10 percent of those in the Île-de-France. The largest sectors of activity in the central business district were finance and insurance (16 percent of employees in the district) and business services (15 percent). The district includes a large concentration of department stores, shopping areas, hotels and restaurants, as well a government offices and ministries.

The second-largest business district in terms of employment is La Défense, just west of the city. In 2010, it was the workplace of 144,600 employees, of whom 38 percent worked in finance and insurance, 16 percent in business support services. Two other important districts, Neuilly-sur-Seine and Levallois-Perret, are extensions of the Paris business district and of La Défense. Another district, including Boulogne-Billancourt, Issy-les-Moulineaux and the southern part of the 15th arrondissement, is a centre of activity for the media and information technology.

In 2021, the top French companies listed in the Fortune Global 500 all have their headquarters in the Paris Region. Six are in the central business district of the City of Paris, four are close to the city in the Hauts-de-Seine Department, three are in La Défense, and one is in Boulogne-Billancourt. Some companies, like Société Générale, have offices in both Paris and La Défense. The Paris Region is France's leading region for economic activity, with a GDP of €865 billion, of which €280 billion was in Paris city. In 2021, its GDP ranked first among the metropolitan regions of the EU, and its per-capita GDP PPP was the 8th highest. While the Paris region's population accounted for 18.8 percent of metropolitan France in 2019, the Paris region's GDP accounted for 32 percent of metropolitan France's GDP.

The Paris Region economy has gradually shifted from industry to high-value-added service industries (finance, IT services) and high-tech manufacturing (electronics, optics, aerospace, etc.). The Paris region's most intense economic activity through the central Hauts-de-Seine department and suburban La Défense business district places Paris's economic centre to the west of the city, in a triangle between the Opéra Garnier, La Défense and the Val de Seine. While the Paris economy is dominated by services, and employment in manufacturing sector has declined sharply, the region remains an important manufacturing centre, particularly for aeronautics, automobiles, and eco industries.

In the 2017 worldwide cost of living survey by the Economist Intelligence Unit, based on a survey made in September 2016, Paris ranked as the seventh most expensive city in the world, and the second most expensive in Europe. In 2018, Paris was the most expensive city in the world along with Singapore and Hong Kong. Station F is a business incubator for startups, noted as the world's largest startup facility. In 2022, Paris was the city with the ninth-highest cost of living in the world.

=== Employment and income ===
The median income in Paris and its nearest departments, 2018. High income in red, low income in yellow.

In 2007, the majority of Paris's salaried employees filled 370,000 businesses services jobs, concentrated in the north-western 8th, 16th and 17th arrondissements. Paris's financial service companies are concentrated in the central-western 8th and 9th arrondissement banking and insurance district. Paris's department store district in the 1st, 6th, 8th, and 9th arrondissements employs ten percent of mostly female Paris workers, with 100,000 of these in the retail trade. Fourteen percent of Parisians worked in hotels and restaurants and other services to individuals.

Nineteen percent of Paris employees work for the State in either administration or education. The majority of Paris's healthcare and social workers work at the hospitals and social housing, concentrated in the peripheral 13th, 14th, 18th, 19th, and 20th arrondissements. Outside Paris, the western Hauts-de-Seine department La Défense district specialising in finance, insurance, and scientific research, employs 144,600. The north-eastern Seine-Saint-Denis audiovisual sector has 200 media firms and 10 major film studios.

Paris's manufacturing is mostly focused in its suburbs. Paris has around 75,000 manufacturing workers, most of whom are in the textile, clothing, leather goods, and shoe trades. In 2015, the Paris region's 800 aerospace companies employed 100,000. Four hundred automobile industry companies employ another 100,000 workers. Many of these are centred in the Yvelines department, around the Renault and PSA-Citroën plants. This department alone employs 33,000. In 2014, the industry as a whole suffered a major loss, with the closing of a major Aulnay-sous-Bois Citroën assembly plant.

The southern Essonne department specialises in science and technology. The south-eastern Val-de-Marne, with its wholesale Rungis food market, specialises in food processing and beverages. The Paris region's manufacturing decline is quickly being replaced by eco-industries. These employ about 100,000 workers.

Incomes are higher in the Western part of Paris and in the western suburbs, than in the northern and eastern parts of the urban area. While Paris has some of the richest neighbourhoods in France, it also has some of the poorest, mostly on the eastern side of the city. In 2012, 14 percent of households in Paris earned less than €977 per month, the official poverty line. Twenty-five percent of residents in the 19th arrondissement lived below the poverty line. In Paris's wealthiest neighbourhood, the 7th arrondissement, 7 percent lived below the poverty line. The unemployment rate in Paris in the 4th trimester of 2021 was six percent, compared with 7.4 percent in the whole of France. This was the lowest rate in thirteen years.

=== Tourism ===
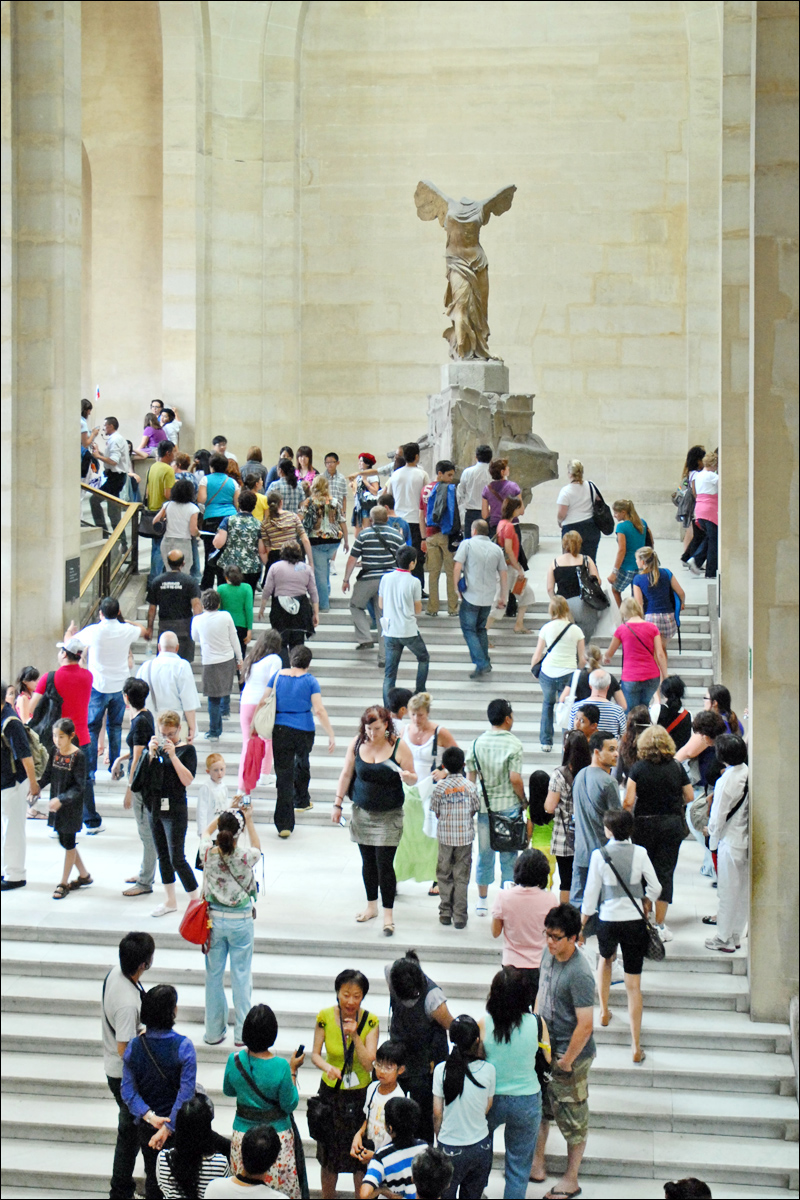
The Louvre, the most-visited art museum in the world

As of 2024, Paris was considered the most attractive city in the world for 4 years in a row by the Euromonitor Global Cities Destination Index. However, by the number of tourists coming from other countries, it was only in 9th place.

Tourism continued to recover in the Paris region in 2022, increasing to 44 million visitors, an increase of 95 percent over 2021, but still 13 percent lower than in 2019.

Greater Paris, comprising Paris and its three surrounding departments, received a record 38 million visitors in 2019, measured by hotel arrivals. These included 12.2 million French visitors. Of the foreign visitors, the greatest number came from the United States (2.6 million), the United Kingdom (1.2 million), Germany (981 thousand), and China (711 thousand).

In 2018, Paris was the second-busiest airline destination in the world, with 19.10 million visitors, behind Bangkok (22.78 million) but ahead of London (19.09 million). In 2016, 393,008 workers in Greater Paris, or 12.4 percent of the total workforce, were engaged in tourism-related sectors such as hotels, catering, transport and leisure.

Paris's top cultural attractions in 2022 were the Louvre Museum (7.7 million visitors), the Eiffel Tower (5.8 million visitors), the Musée d'Orsay (3.27 million visitors) and the Centre Pompidou (3 million visitors).

In 2019, Greater Paris had 2,056 hotels, including 94 five-star hotels, with a total of 121,646 rooms. In 2019, in addition to the hotels, Greater Paris had 60,000 homes registered with Airbnb. Under French law, renters of these units must pay the Paris tourism tax. The company paid the city government 7.3 million euros in 2016.

A minuscule fraction of foreign visitors suffer from Paris syndrome, when their experiences do not meet expectations.

== Culture ==
=== Painting and sculpture ===
Auguste Renoir, Bal du moulin de la Galette, 1876, oil on canvas, 131 cm × 175 cm (52 in × 69 in), Musée d'Orsay

For centuries, Paris has attracted artists from around the world. As a result, Paris has acquired a reputation as the "City of Art". Italian artists were a profound influence on the development of art in Paris in the 16th and 17th centuries, particularly in sculpture and reliefs. Painting and sculpture became the pride of the French monarchy, and the French royal family commissioned many Parisian artists to adorn their palaces during the French Baroque and Classicism era. Sculptors such as Girardon, Coysevox, and Coustou acquired reputations as the finest artists in the royal court in 17th-century France. Pierre Mignard became the first painter to King Louis XIV during this period. In 1648, the Académie royale de peinture et de sculpture (Royal Academy of Painting and Sculpture) was established to accommodate the dramatic interest in art in the capital.

Paris was in its artistic prime in the 19th century and early 20th century, when it had a colony of artists established in the city and in art schools associated with some of the finest painters of the times: Henri de Toulouse-Lautrec, Édouard Manet, Claude Monet, Berthe Morisot, Paul Gauguin, Pierre-Auguste Renoir and others. Paris was central to the development of Romanticism in art, with painters such as Géricault. Impressionism, Art Nouveau, Symbolism, Fauvism, Cubism and Art Deco movements all evolved in Paris. In the late 19th century, many artists in the French provinces and worldwide flocked to Paris to exhibit their works in the numerous salons and expositions and make a name for themselves. Artists such as Pablo Picasso, Henri Matisse, Vincent van Gogh, Paul Cézanne, Jean Metzinger, Albert Gleizes, Henri Rousseau, Marc Chagall, Amedeo Modigliani became associated with Paris.

The most prestigious sculptors who made their reputation in Paris in the modern era are Frédéric Auguste Bartholdi (Statue of Liberty), Auguste Rodin, Camille Claudel, Antoine Bourdelle, Paul Landowski (Christ the Redeemer in Rio de Janeiro) and Aristide Maillol. The Golden Age of the School of Paris ended between the two world wars.

=== Museums ===
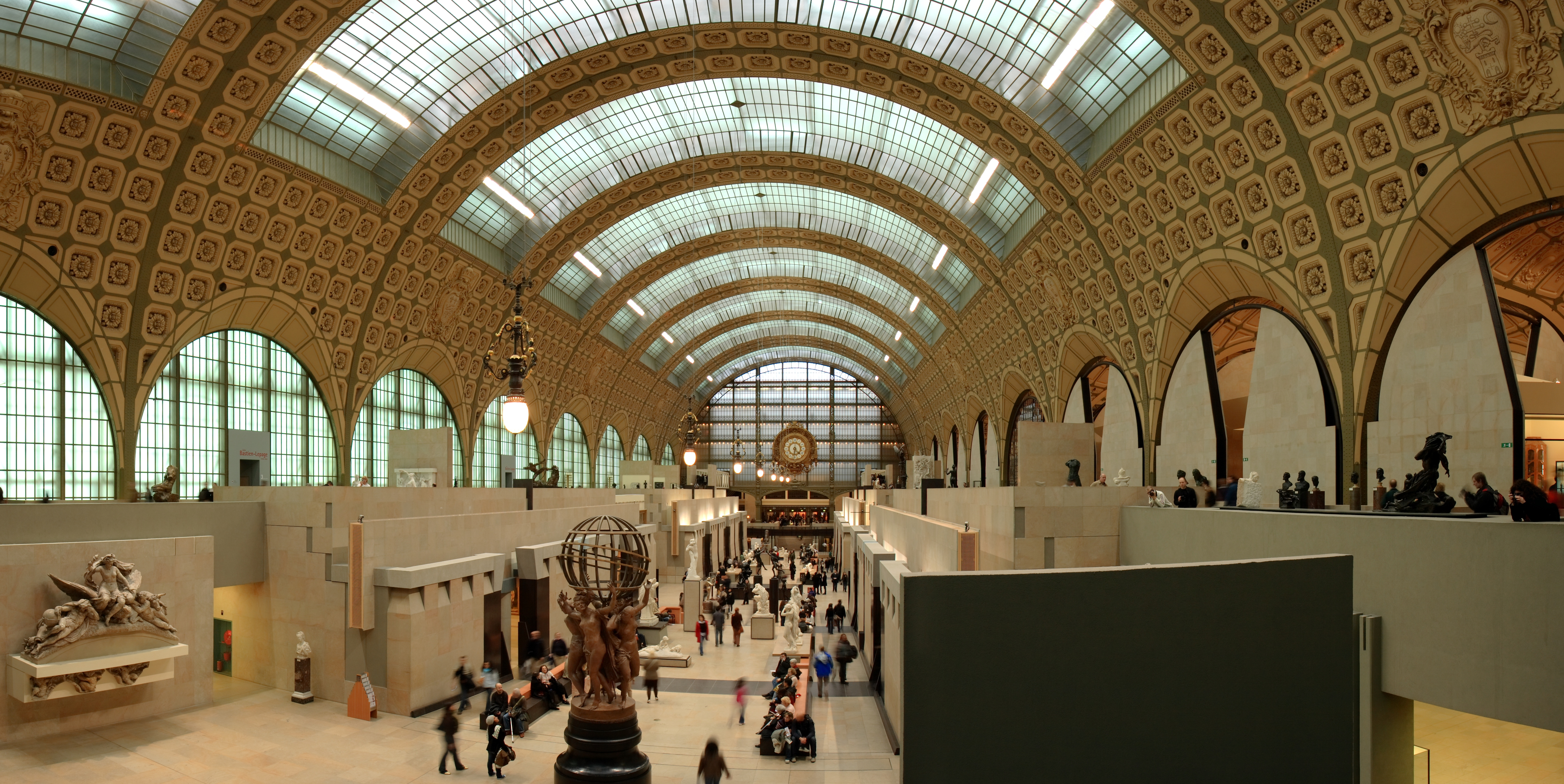
Musée d'Orsay

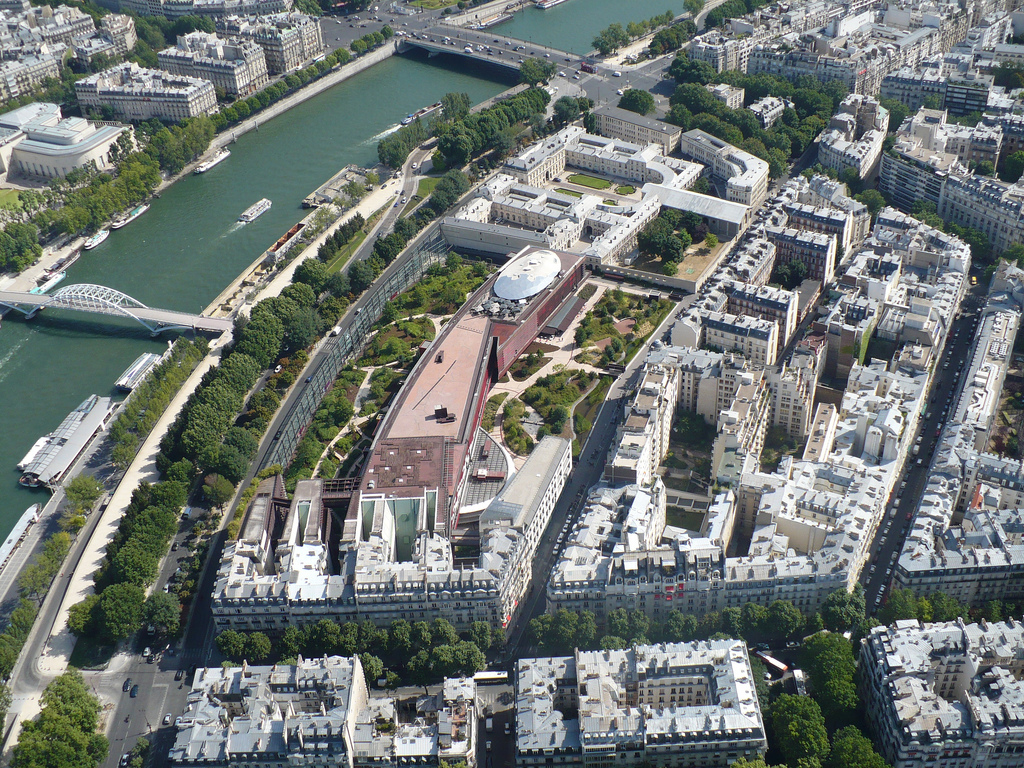
Musée du quai Branly

Paris is home to several major art and history museums. The Louvre received 2.8 million visitors in 2021, holding its position as the world's most-visited museum. Its collections include the Mona Lisa, the Venus de Milo statue, and Liberty Leading the People. The second-most visited museum, with 1.5 million visitors in 2021, was the Centre Georges Pompidou, also known as Beaubourg, which houses the Musée National d'Art Moderne. The National Museum of Natural History followed with 1.4 million visitors. It is known for its dinosaur artefacts, mineral collections, and its Gallery of Evolution.

The Musée d'Orsay, featuring 19th-century art and the French Impressionists, had one million visitors. Paris hosts one of the largest science museums in Europe, the Cité des sciences et de l'industrie (984,000 visitors in 2020), and one of the oldest, the Musée des Arts et Métiers (opened in 1794). The other most-visited museums in 2021 were the Fondation Louis Vuitton (691,000), the Musée du Quai Branly – Jacques Chirac, featuring indigenous art and cultures of Africa, Asia, Oceania, and the Americas. (616,000); the Musée Carnavalet (History of Paris) (606,000), and the Petit Palais, the art museum of the City of Paris (518,000).

The Musée de l'Orangerie, near the Louvre and the Orsay, also exhibits Impressionists and Post-Impressionists, including most of Claude Monet's large Water Lilies murals. The Musée national du Moyen Âge, or Cluny Museum, presents Medieval art. The Guimet Museum, or Musée national des arts asiatiques, has one of the largest collections of Asian art in Europe. There are also notable museums devoted to individual artists, including the Musée Picasso, the Musée Rodin, and the Musée national Eugène Delacroix.

The military history of France is presented by displays at the Musée de l'Armée at Les Invalides. In addition to the national museums, run by the Ministry of Culture, the City of Paris operates 14 museums, including the Carnavalet Museum on the history of Paris, Musée d'Art Moderne de la Ville de Paris, Palais de Tokyo, the House of Victor Hugo, the House of Balzac and the Catacombs of Paris. There are also notable private museums. The Contemporary Art museum of the Louis Vuitton Foundation, designed by architect Frank Gehry, opened in October 2014 in the Bois de Boulogne.

=== Theatre ===
The Opéra Bastille

The largest opera houses of Paris are the 19th-century Opéra Garnier (historical Paris Opéra) and modern Opéra Bastille. The Opéra Garnier tends toward the more classic ballets and operas. The Paris Opéra provides a mixed repertoire of classic and modern. In the mid-19th century, there were three other active and competing opera houses: the Opéra-Comique (which still exists), Théâtre-Italien and Théâtre Lyrique (now the Théâtre de la Ville). Philharmonie de Paris, the modern symphonic concert hall of Paris, opened in January 2015. Another musical landmark is the Théâtre des Champs-Élysées, where the first performances of Diaghilev's Ballets Russes took place in 1913.

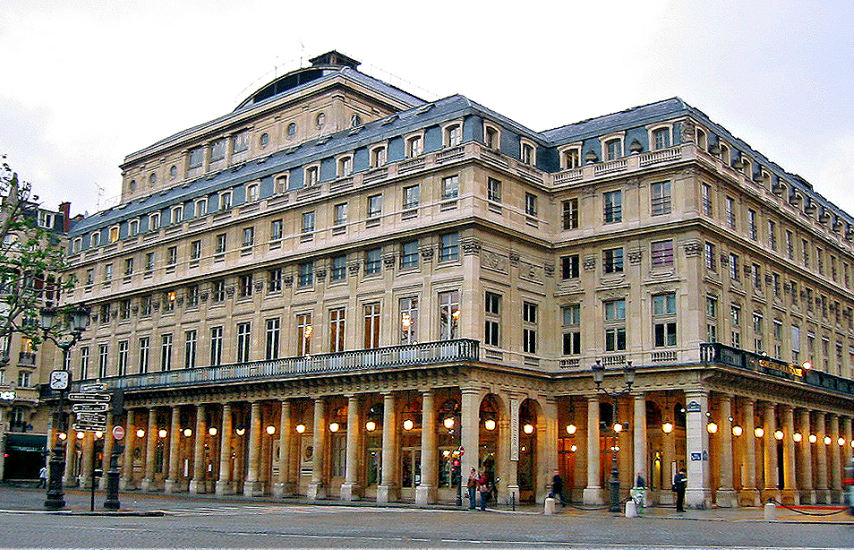
The Comédie Française (Salle Richelieu)

Theatre traditionally has occupied a large place in Parisian culture, and many of its most popular actors today are also stars of French television. The oldest and most famous Paris theatre is the Comédie-Française, founded in 1680. Run by the Government of France, it performs mostly French classics at the Salle Richelieu in the Palais-Royal. Other famous theatres include the Odéon-Théâtre de l'Europe, also a state institution and theatrical landmark; the Théâtre Mogador; and the Théâtre de la Gaîté-Montparnasse.

The music hall and cabaret are famous Paris institutions. The Moulin Rouge opened in 1889 and became the birthplace of the Cancan dance. It helped make famous the singers Mistinguett and Édith Piaf and the painter Toulouse-Lautrec, who made posters for the venue. In 1911, the dance hall Olympia Paris invented the grand staircase as a setting for its shows, competing with its great rival, the Folies Bergère.

The Casino de Paris presented many famous French singers, including Mistinguett, Maurice Chevalier and Tino Rossi. Other famous Paris music halls include Le Lido, on the Champs-Élysées, opened in 1946; and the Crazy Horse Saloon, featuring strip-tease, dance, and magic, opened in 1951. A half dozen music halls exist today in Paris, attended mostly by visitors to the city.

=== Literature ===
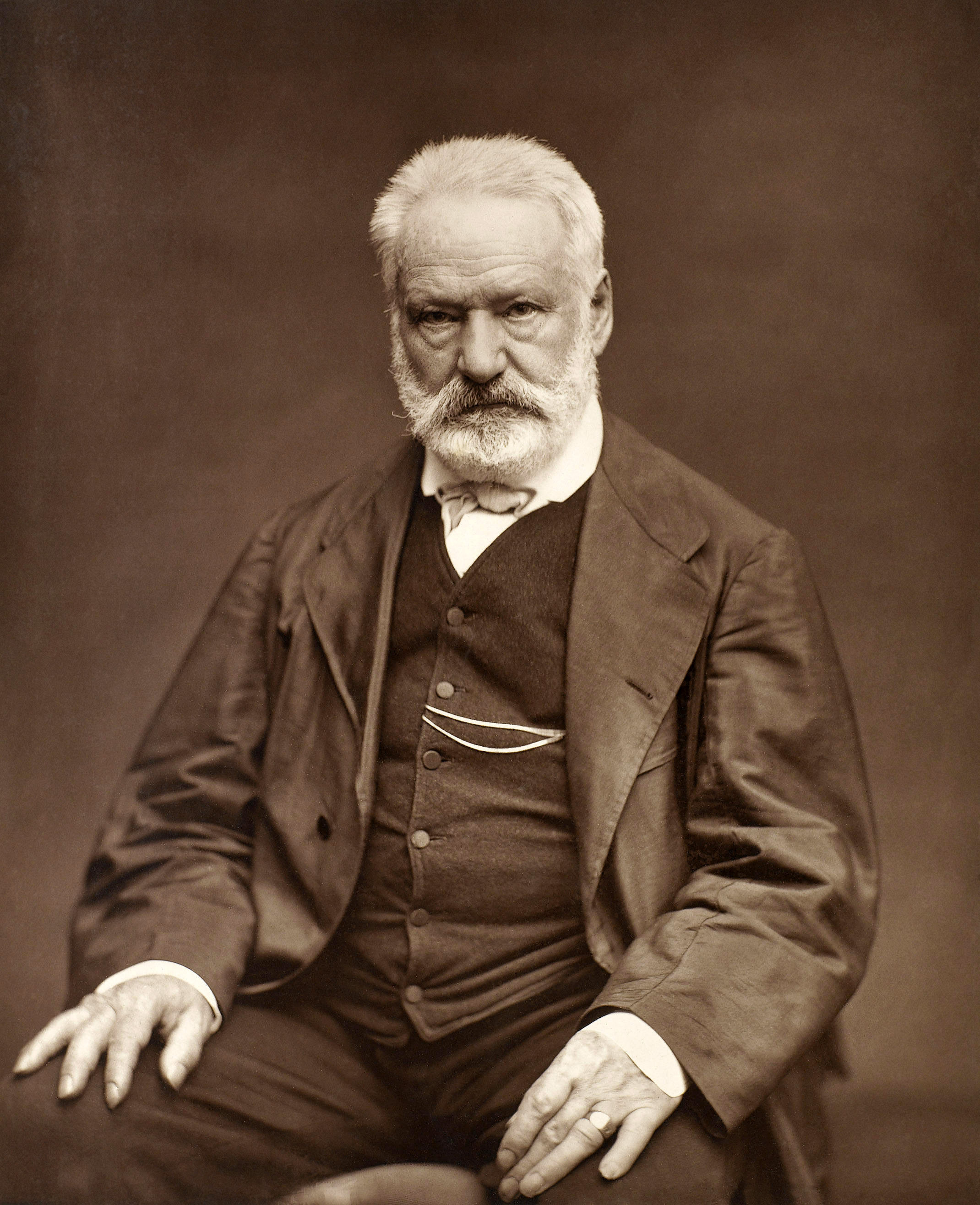
Victor Hugo

The first book printed in France, Epistolae ("Letters"), by Gasparinus de Bergamo, was published in Paris in 1470 by the press established by Johann Heynlin. Paris has since been the centre of the French publishing industry, the home of some of the world's best-known writers and poets, and the setting for many classic works of French literature. Paris did not become the acknowledged capital of French literature until the 17th century, with authors such as Boileau, Corneille, La Fontaine, Molière, Racine, Charles Perrault, several coming from the provinces, as well as the foundation of the Académie française. In the 18th century, the literary life of Paris revolved around the cafés and salons; it was dominated by Voltaire, Jean-Jacques Rousseau, Pierre de Marivaux, and Pierre Beaumarchais.

During the 19th century, Paris was the home and subject for some of France's greatest writers, including Charles Baudelaire, Stéphane Mallarmé, Mérimée, Alfred de Musset, Marcel Proust, Émile Zola, Alexandre Dumas, Gustave Flaubert, Guy de Maupassant and Honoré de Balzac. Victor Hugo's The Hunchback of Notre-Dame inspired the renovation of its setting, the Notre-Dame de Paris. Another of Hugo's works, Les Misérables, described the social change and political turmoil in Paris in the early 1830s. One of the most popular of all French writers, Jules Verne, worked at the Theatre Lyrique and the Paris stock exchange while he did research for his stories at the National Library.

In the 20th century, the Paris literary community was dominated by figures such as Colette, André Gide, François Mauriac, André Malraux, Albert Camus, and, after World War II, by Simone de Beauvoir and Jean-Paul Sartre. Between the wars, it was the home of many important expatriate writers, including Ernest Hemingway, Samuel Beckett, Miguel Ángel Asturias, Alejo Carpentier, and Arturo Uslar Pietri. The winner of the 2014 Nobel Prize in Literature, Patrick Modiano, based most of his literary work on the depiction of the city during World War II and the 1960s–1970s.

In the 1970s, 80 percent of French-language publishing houses were found in Paris. It is also a city of small bookstores. There are about 150 bookstores in the 5th arrondissement alone, plus another 250 book stalls along the Seine. Small Paris bookstores are protected against competition from discount booksellers by French law; books, even e-books, cannot be discounted more than five percent below their publisher's cover price.

=== Music ===
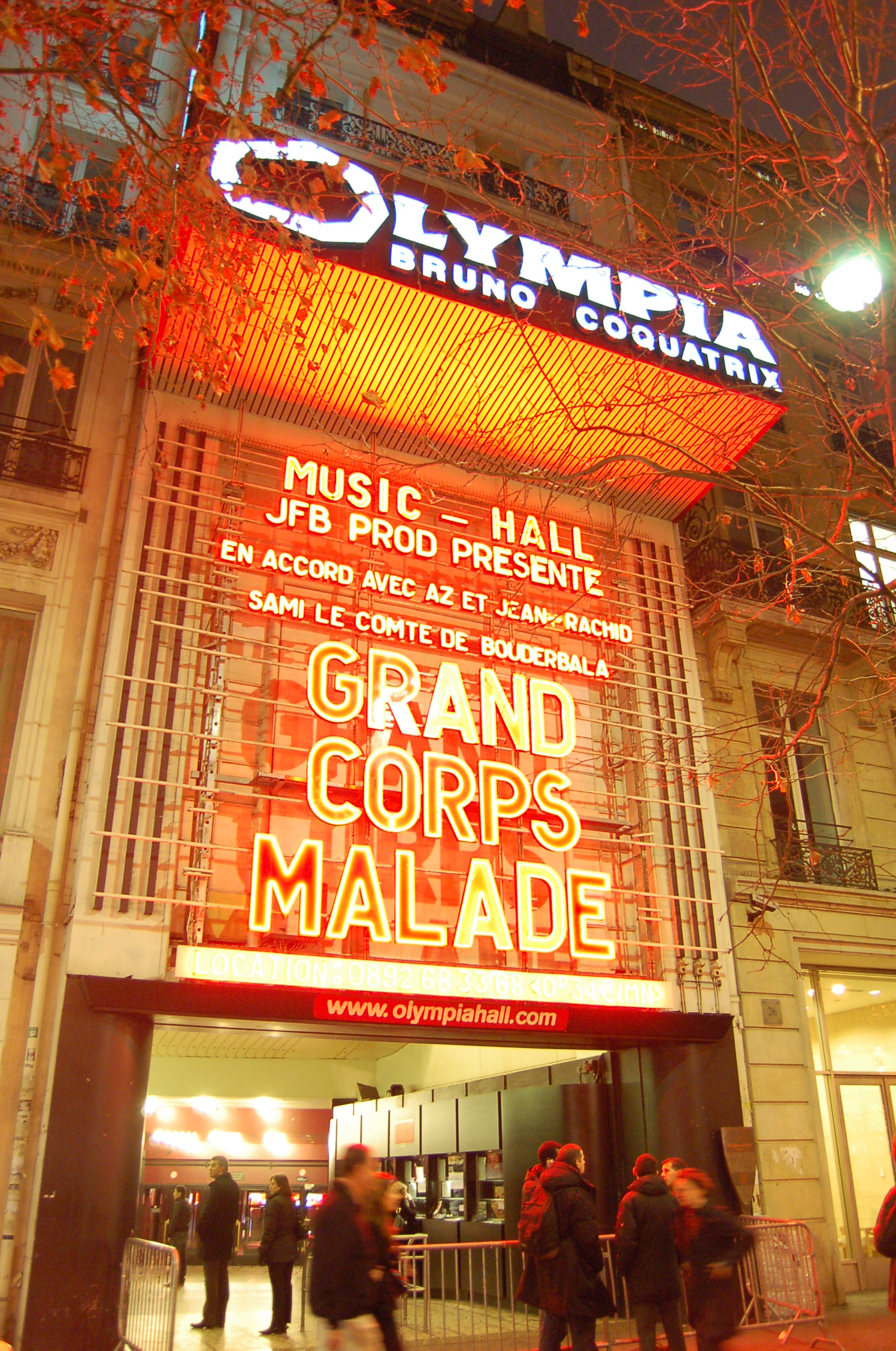
Olympia music hall

In the late 12th century, a school of polyphony was established at Notre-Dame. Among the Trouvères of northern France, a group of Parisian aristocrats became known for their poetry and songs. Troubadours, from the south of France, were also popular. During the reign of François I, in the Renaissance era, the lute became popular in the French court. The French royal family and courtiers "disported themselves in masques, ballets, allegorical dances, recitals, and opera and comedy", and a national musical printing house was established. In the Baroque-era, noted composers included Jean-Baptiste Lully, Jean-Philippe Rameau, and François Couperin. The Conservatoire de Musique de Paris was founded in 1795. By 1870, Paris had become an important centre for symphony, ballet, and operatic music.

Romantic-era composers include Hector Berlioz, Charles Gounod, Camille Saint-Saëns, Léo Delibes and Jules Massenet, among others. Georges Bizet's Carmen premiered in 1875 and has become one of the most popular operas in the classical canon. Among the Impressionist composers who created new works for piano, orchestra, opera, chamber music and other musical forms, stand in particular Claude Debussy, Erik Satie and Maurice Ravel. Several foreign-born composers, such as Frédéric Chopin, Franz Liszt, Jacques Offenbach, Niccolò Paganini, and Igor Stravinsky, established themselves or made significant contributions both with their works and their influence in Paris.

Bal-musette is a style of French music and dance that first became popular in Paris in the 1870s; by 1880, Paris had some 150 dance halls. Patrons danced the bourrée to the accompaniment of the cabrette (a bellows-blown bagpipe locally called a "musette") and the vielle à roue (hurdy-gurdy) in the cafés and bars of the city. Parisian and Italian musicians who played the accordion adopted the style and established themselves in Auvergnat bars, and Paris became a major centre for jazz and still attracts jazz musicians from all around the world to its clubs and cafés. Paris is the spiritual home of gypsy jazz, and many of the Parisian jazzmen who developed in the first half of the 20th century began by playing Bal-musette in the city. Django Reinhardt rose to fame in Paris and performed with violinist Stéphane Grappelli and their Quintette du Hot Club de France in the 1930s and 1940s.

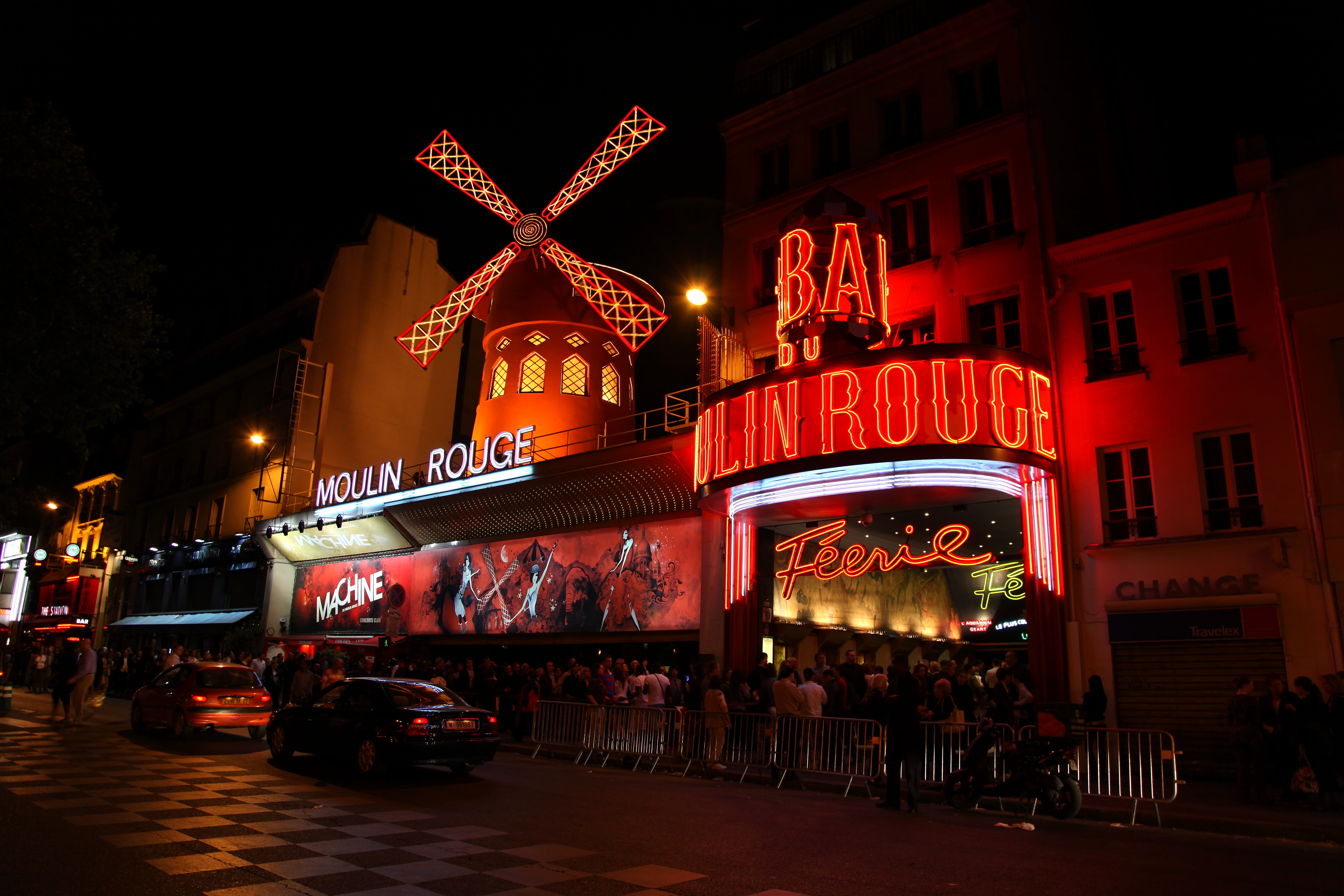
The Moulin Rouge has hosted many singers including Parisian Édith Piaf

Immediately after the war, the Saint-Germain-des-Prés quarter and the nearby Saint-Michel quarter became home to many small jazz clubs, including the Caveau des Lorientais, the Club Saint-Germain, the Rose Rouge, the Vieux-Colombier, and the most famous, Le Tabou. They introduced Parisians to the music of Claude Luter, Boris Vian, Sydney Bechet, Mezz Mezzrow, and Henri Salvador. Most of the clubs closed by the early 1960s, as musical tastes shifted toward rock and roll.

Some of the finest manouche musicians in the world are found here playing the cafés of the city at night. Some of the more notable jazz venues include the New Morning, Le Sunset, La Chope des Puces and Bouquet du Nord. Several yearly festivals take place in Paris, including the Paris Jazz Festival and the rock festival Rock en Seine. The Orchestre de Paris was established in 1967. Édith Piaf is widely regarded as France's national chanteuse and one of France's greatest international stars.

Paris has a big hip hop scene. This music became popular during the 1980s.

=== Cinema ===
A poster for the Lumière brothers 1895 film L'Arroseur Arrosé, the earliest comedy, and the first film to portray a fictional story

The movie industry was born in Paris when Auguste and Louis Lumière projected the first motion picture for a paying audience at the Grand Café on 28 December 1895. Many of Paris's concert/dance halls were transformed into cinemas when the media became popular beginning in the 1930s. Paris's largest cinema room today is in the Grand Rex theatre with 2,700 seats. Big multiplex cinemas have been built since the 1990s. UGC Ciné Cité Les Halles, with 27 screens, MK2 Bibliothèque with 20 screens, and UGC Ciné Cité Bercy with 18 screens are among the largest.

Parisians tend to share the same movie-going trends as many of the world's global cities, with cinemas primarily dominated by Hollywood-generated film entertainment. French cinema comes a close second, with major directors (réalisateurs) such as Claude Lelouch, Jean-Luc Godard, and Luc Besson, and the more slapstick/popular genre with director Claude Zidi as an example.

=== Restaurants and cuisine ===
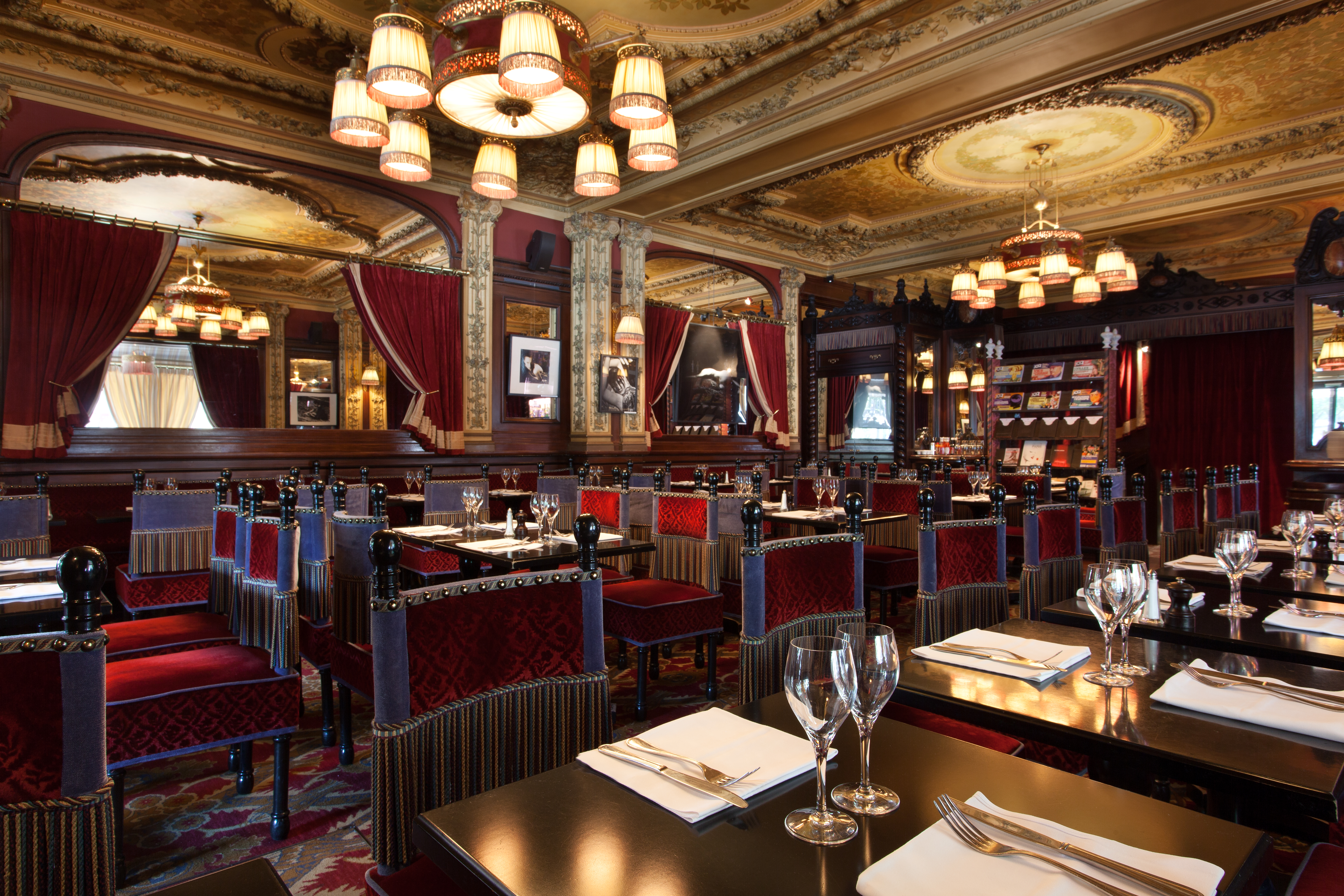
Le Zimmer, on the Place du Châtelet

Since the late 18th century, Paris has been famous for its restaurants and haute cuisine, food meticulously prepared and artfully presented. La Taverne Anglaise, opened in 1786 in the arcades of the Palais-Royal by Antoine Beauvilliers; it became a model for future luxury Paris restaurants. The restaurant Le Grand Véfour in the Palais-Royal dates from the same period. The famous Paris restaurants of the 19th century, including the Café de Paris, the Rocher de Cancale, the Café Anglais, Maison Dorée and the Café Riche, were mostly located near the theatres on the Boulevard des Italiens. Several of the best-known restaurants in Paris today appeared during the Belle Époque, including Maxim's on Rue Royale, Ledoyen in the gardens of the Champs-Élysées, and the Tour d'Argent on the Quai de la Tournelle.

Today, owing to Paris's cosmopolitan population, every French regional cuisine and almost every national cuisine in the world can be found there; the city has more than 9,000 restaurants. The Michelin Guide has been a standard guide to French restaurants since 1900, awarding its highest award, three stars, to the best restaurants in France. In 2018, of the 27 Michelin three-star restaurants in France, ten are located in Paris. These include both restaurants that serve classical French cuisine, such as L'Ambroisie, and those that serve non-traditional menus, such as L'Astrance, which combines French and Asian cuisines. Several of France's most famous chefs, including Pierre Gagnaire, Alain Ducasse, Yannick Alléno, and Alain Passard, have three-star restaurants in Paris.

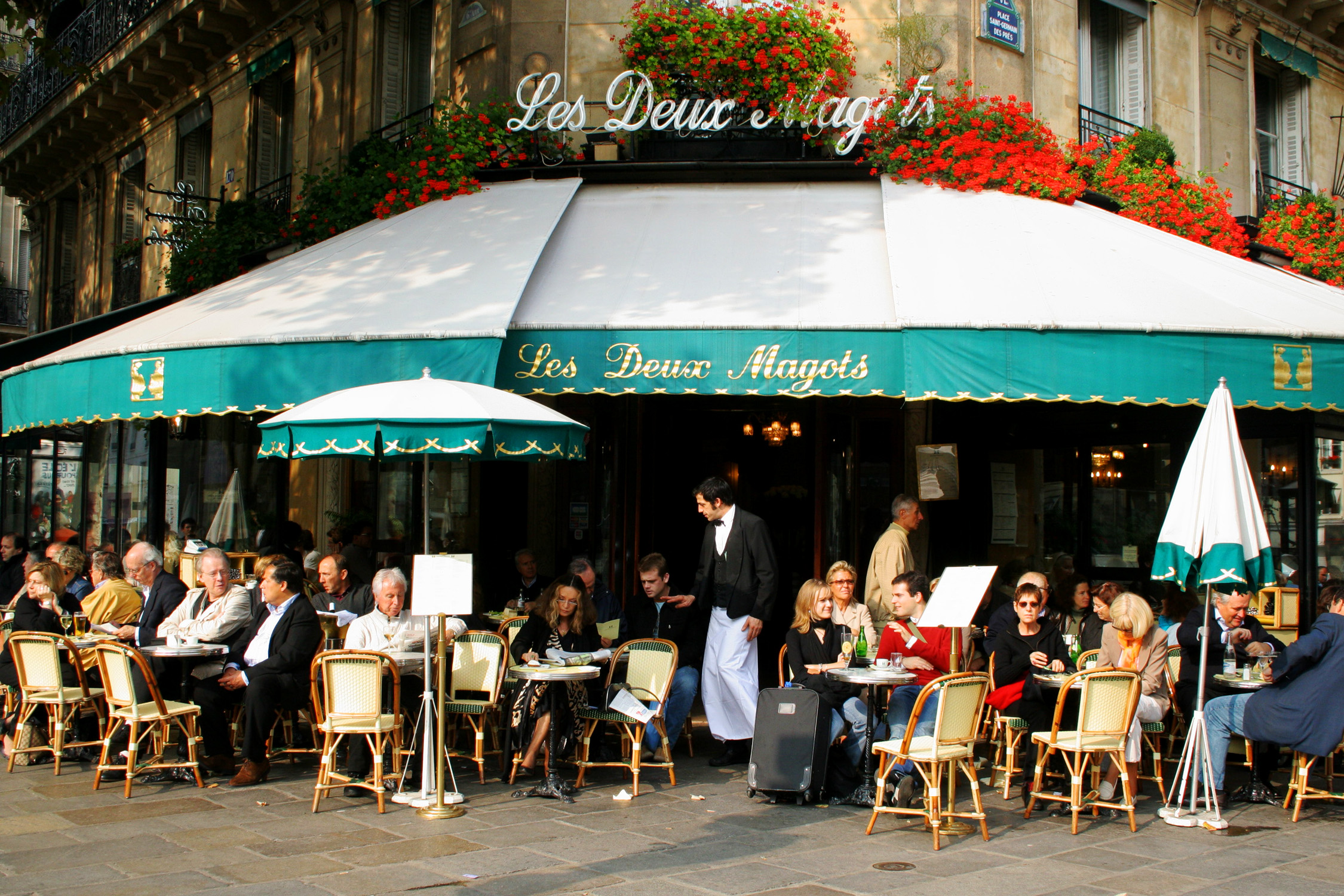
Les Deux Magots café on Boulevard Saint-Germain

Paris has several other kinds of traditional eating places. The café arrived in Paris in the 17th century, and by the 18th century, Parisian cafés were centres of the city's political and cultural life. The Café Procope on the Left Bank dates from this period. In the 20th century, the cafés of the Left Bank, especially Café de la Rotonde and Le Dôme Café in Montparnasse and Café de Flore and Les Deux Magots on Boulevard Saint Germain, all still in business, were important meeting places for painters, writers and philosophers.

A bistro is a type of eating place loosely defined as a neighbourhood restaurant with a modest decor and prices and a regular clientele, and a congenial atmosphere. Real bistros are increasingly rare in Paris, due to rising costs, competition, and different eating habits of Parisian diners. A brasserie originally was a tavern located next to a brewery, which served beer and food at any hour. Beginning with the Paris Exposition of 1867, it became a popular kind of restaurant which featured beer and other beverages served by young women in the national costume associated with the beverage. Now, brasseries, like cafés, serve food and drinks throughout the day.

=== Fashion ===
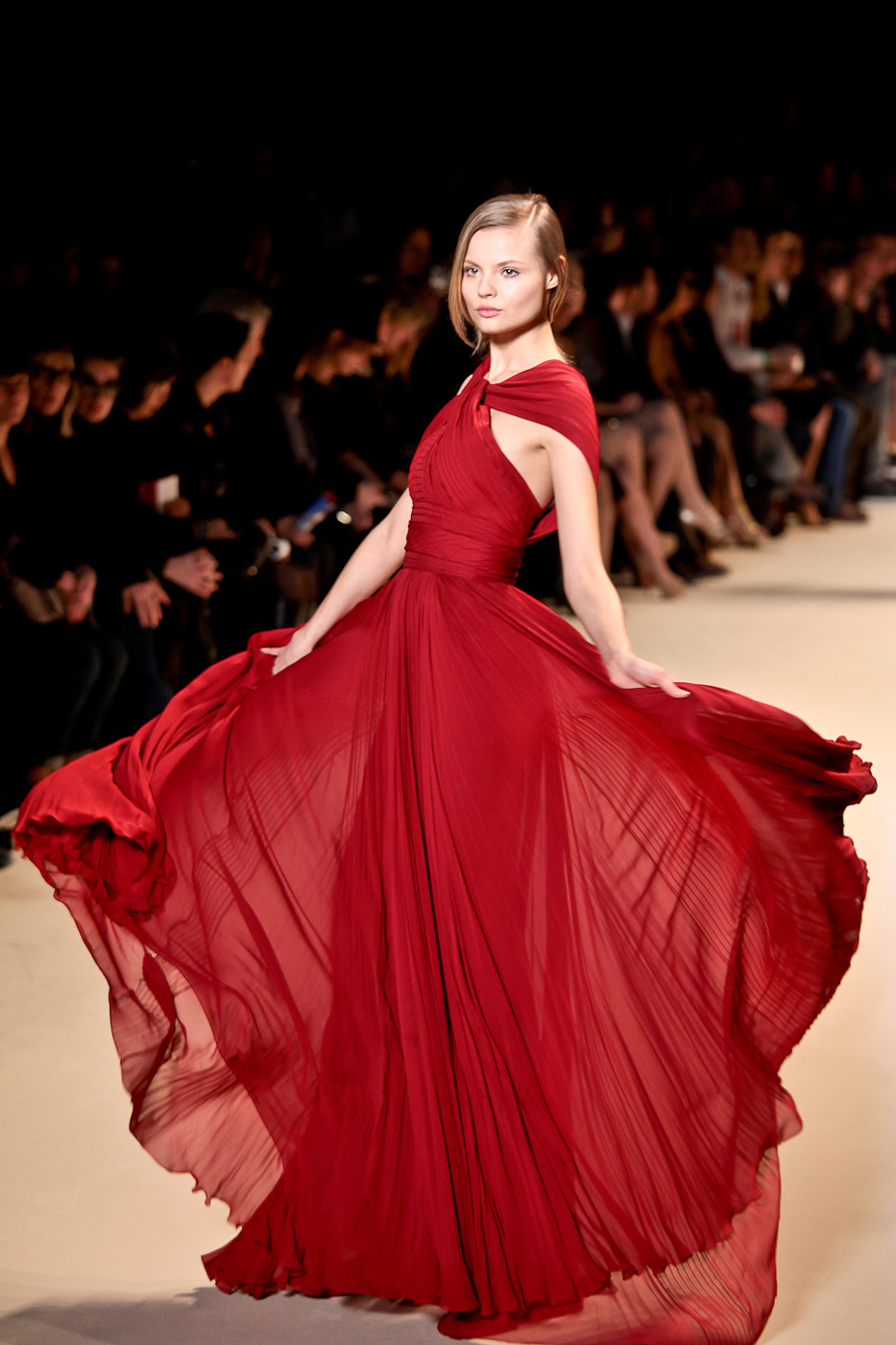
Magdalena Frackowiak at Paris Fashion Week, Autumn 2011

Since the 19th century, Paris has been an international fashion capital, particularly in the domain of haute couture (clothing hand-made to order for private clients). It is home to some of the largest fashion houses in the world, including Dior and Chanel, as well as many other well-known and more contemporary fashion designers, such as Karl Lagerfeld, Jean-Paul Gaultier, Yves Saint Laurent, Givenchy, and Christian Lacroix. Paris Fashion Week, held in January and July in the Carrousel du Louvre among other renowned city locations, is one of the top four events on the international fashion calendar.

Paris is also the home of the world's largest cosmetics company, L'Oréal, as well as three of the top five global makers of luxury fashion accessories: Louis Vuitton, Hermés, and Cartier. Most of the major fashion designers have their showrooms along the Avenue Montaigne, between the Champs-Élysées and the Seine.

=== Photography ===
The inventor Nicéphore Niépce produced the first permanent photograph on a polished pewter plate in Paris in 1825. In 1839, Louis Daguerre patented the Daguerreotype, which became the most common form of photography until the 1860s. The work of Étienne-Jules Marey in the 1880s contributed considerably to the development of modern photography. Photography came to occupy a central role in Parisian Surrealist activity, in the works of Man Ray and Maurice Tabard.

Numerous photographers achieved renown for their photography of Paris, including Eugène Atget, noted for his depictions of street scenes; Robert Doisneau, noted for his playful pictures of people and market scenes (among which Le baiser de l'hôtel de ville has become iconic of the romantic vision of Paris); Marcel Bovis, noted for his night scenes; Jacques-Henri Lartigue; and Henri Cartier-Bresson. Poster art also became an important art form in Paris in the late nineteenth century, through the work of Henri de Toulouse-Lautrec, Jules Chéret, Eugène Grasset, Adolphe Willette, Pierre Bonnard, Georges de Feure, Henri-Gabriel Ibels, Paul Gavarni and Alphonse Mucha.

=== Media ===
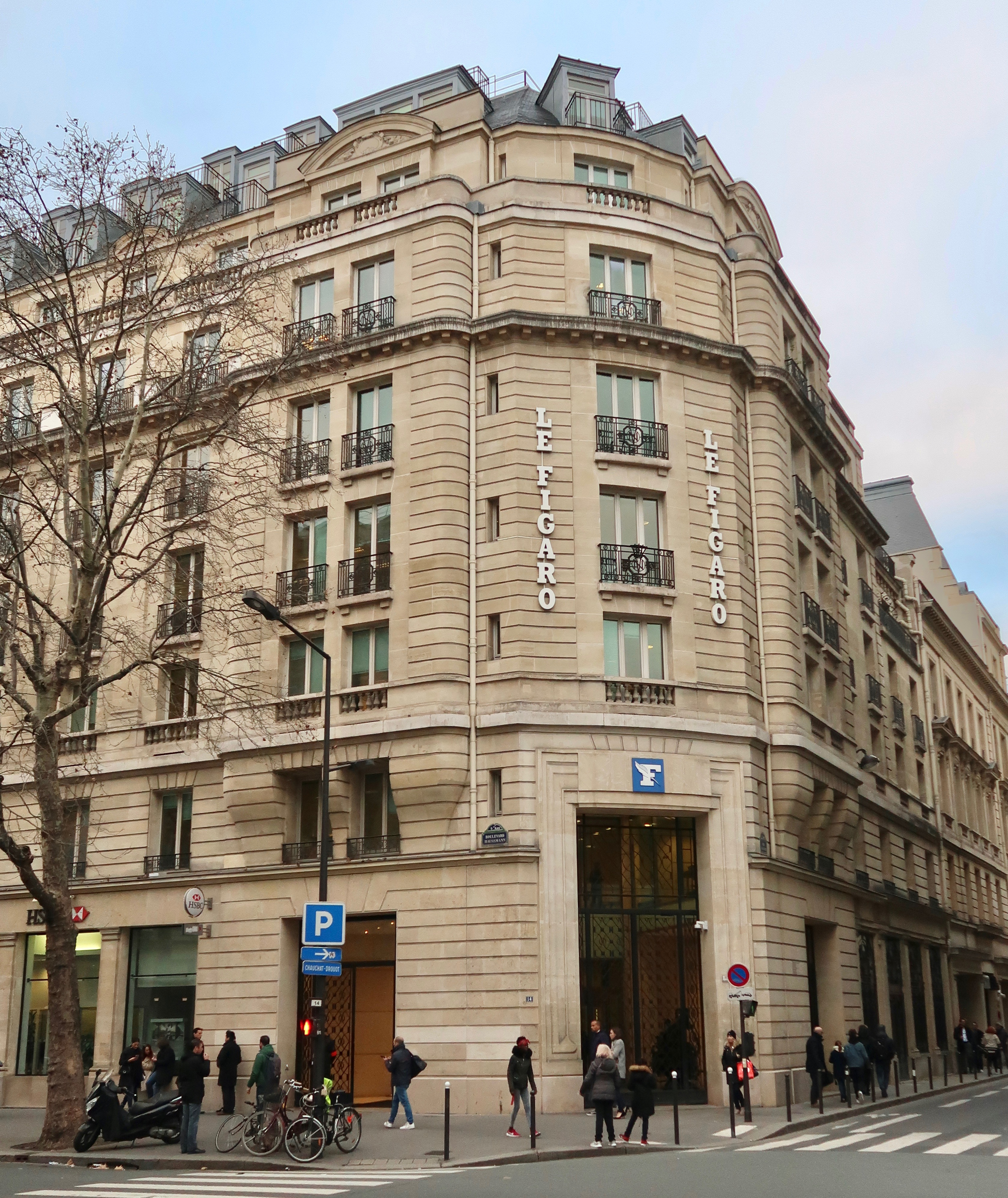
Founded in 1826, Le Figaro is still considered a newspaper of record.

Agence France-Presse Headquarters in Paris

Paris and its close suburbs are home to numerous newspapers, magazines and publications including Le Monde, Le Figaro, Libération, Le Nouvel Observateur, Le Canard enchaîné, La Croix, Le Parisien (in Saint-Ouen), Les Échos, Paris Match (Neuilly-sur-Seine), Réseaux & Télécoms, Reuters France, l'Équipe (Boulogne-Billancourt) and L'Officiel des Spectacles. France's two most prestigious newspapers, Le Monde and Le Figaro, are the centrepieces of the Parisian publishing industry. Agence France-Presse is France's oldest continually operating news agency and is headquartered in Paris. France 24 is a television news channel owned and operated by the French government. France Diplomatie, owned and operated by the Ministry of Foreign and European Affairs, pertains solely to diplomatic news and occurrences.

The most-viewed network in France, TF1, is in nearby Boulogne-Billancourt. France 2, France 3, Canal+, France 5, M6 (Neuilly-sur-Seine), Arte, D8, W9, NT1, NRJ 12, La Chaîne parlementaire, France 4, BFM TV, and Gulli are other stations located in and around the capital. Radio France, France's public radio broadcaster, and its various channels, is headquartered in Paris's 16th arrondissement. Radio France Internationale, another public broadcaster, is also based in the city. Paris also holds the headquarters of the La Poste, France's national postal carrier.

=== Holidays and festivals ===
Bastille Day, a celebration of the storming of the Bastille in 1789, the biggest festival in the city, is a military parade taking place every year on 14 July on the Champs-Élysées, from the Arc de Triomphe to Place de la Concorde. It includes a flypast over the Champs Élysées by the Patrouille de France, a parade of military units and equipment, and a display of fireworks in the evening, the most spectacular being the one at the Eiffel Tower.

Other yearly festivals include Paris-Plages, a festive summertime event when the Right Bank of the Seine is converted into a temporary beach; Journées du Patrimoine, Fête de la Musique, Techno Parade, Nuit Blanche, Cinéma au clair de lune, Printemps des rues, Festival d'automne, and Fête des jardins. The Carnaval de Paris, one of the oldest festivals in Paris, dates back to the Middle Ages.

=== Libraries ===
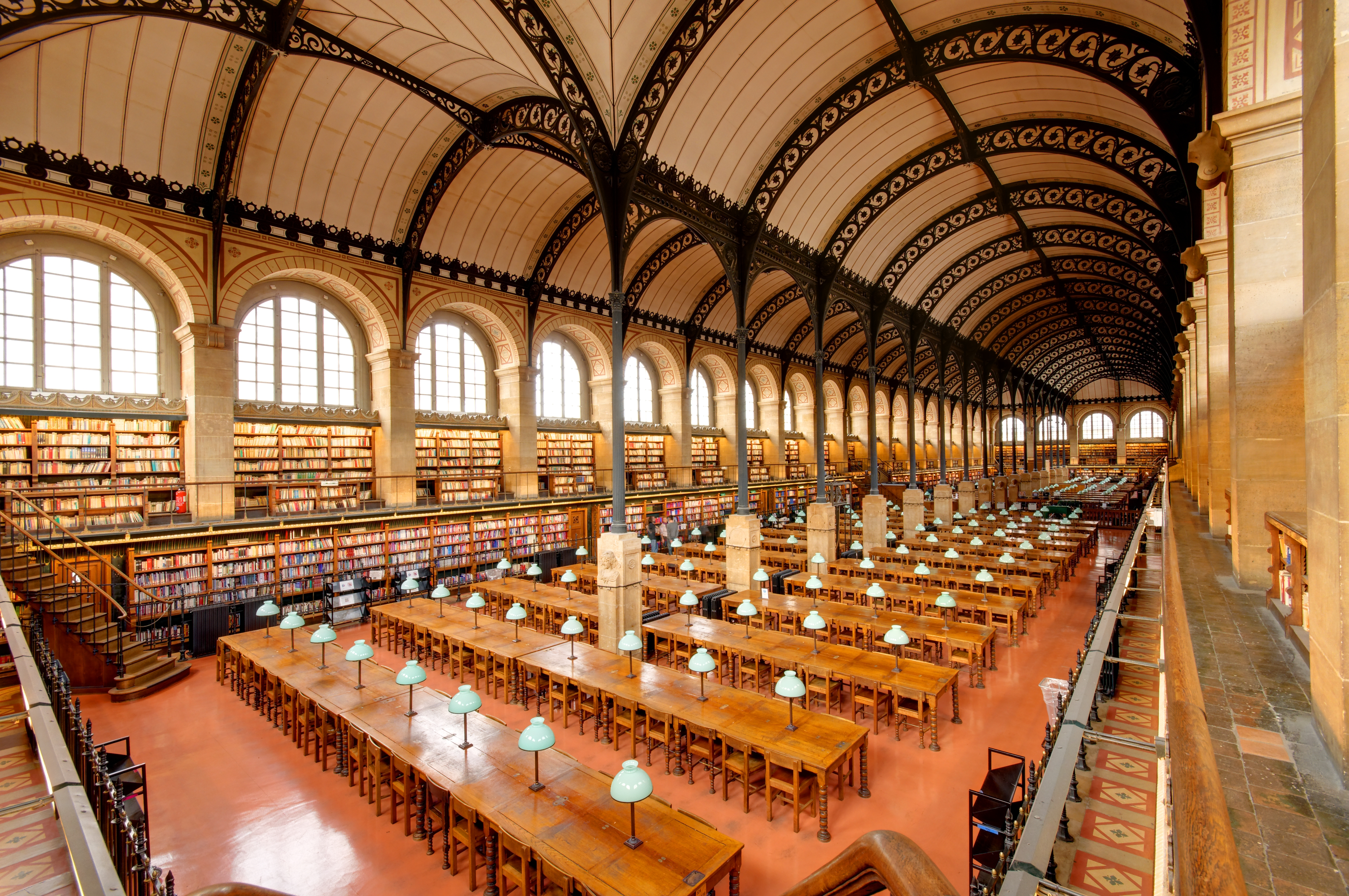
Sainte-Geneviève Library

The Bibliothèque nationale de France (BnF) operates public libraries in Paris, among them the François Mitterrand Library, Richelieu Library, Louvois, Opéra Library, and Arsenal Library.

The Bibliothèque Forney, in the Marais district, is dedicated to the decorative arts; the Arsenal Library occupies a former military building, and has a large collection on French literature; and the Bibliothèque historique de la ville de Paris, also in Le Marais, contains the Paris historical research service. The Sainte-Geneviève Library, designed by Henri Labrouste and built in the mid-1800s, contains a rare book and manuscript division. Bibliothèque Mazarine is the oldest public library in France. The Médiathèque Musicale Mahler opened in 1986 and contains collections related to music. The François Mitterrand Library (nicknamed Très Grande Bibliothèque) was completed in 1994 to a design of Dominique Perrault and contains four glass towers.

There are several academic libraries and archives in Paris. The Sorbonne Library is the largest university library in Paris. In addition to the Sorbonne location, there are branches in Malesherbes, Clignancourt-Championnet, Michelet-Institut d'Art et d'Archéologie, Serpente-Maison de la Recherche, and Institut des Etudes Ibériques. Other academic libraries include Interuniversity Pharmaceutical Library, Leonardo da Vinci University Library, Paris School of Mines Library, and the René Descartes University Library.

== Sports ==
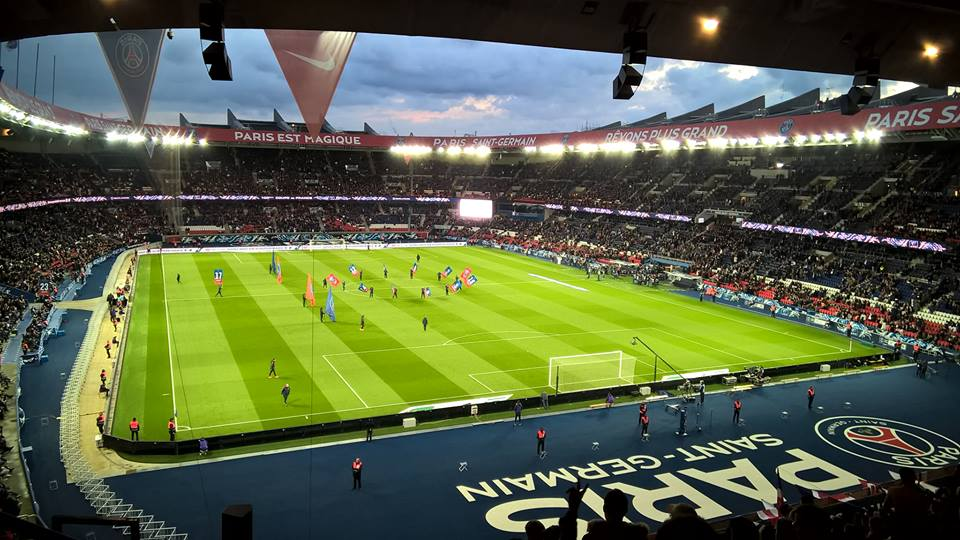
Parc des Princes, the stadium of Paris Saint-Germain

Paris's major sports clubs are the association football club Paris Saint-Germain F.C. (PSG) and the rugby union clubs Stade Français and Racing 92. The 80,000-seat Stade de France, built for the 1998 FIFA World Cup, is located just north of Paris in the commune of Saint-Denis. It is used for football, rugby union, and track and field athletics. It hosts the France national football team for friendlies and major tournaments qualifiers, the French national rugby team's home matches of the Six Nations Championship, and several important matches of the Stade Français rugby team. The city and closer suburbs have several other professional and amateur football clubs, including Paris FC and Red Star FC.

Rugby league is not as popular in Paris as in other areas of France. Despite this, the capital has hosted several major events in the sport's history since the country's first game, an exhibition match between the Australia national team and a British League Select XIII, in December 1933. The Rugby League World Cup was first held in 1954 with the Parc des Princes hosting the opening match and the final in which France finished as runners-up to Great Britain. The newly rebuilt Parc des Princes was later used for a group game of the 1972 Rugby League World Cup. A rugby league department of PSG was created to participate in the Super League. In 2006, Catalans Dragons became the first French side to enter the British rugby league system following PSG's withdrawal.

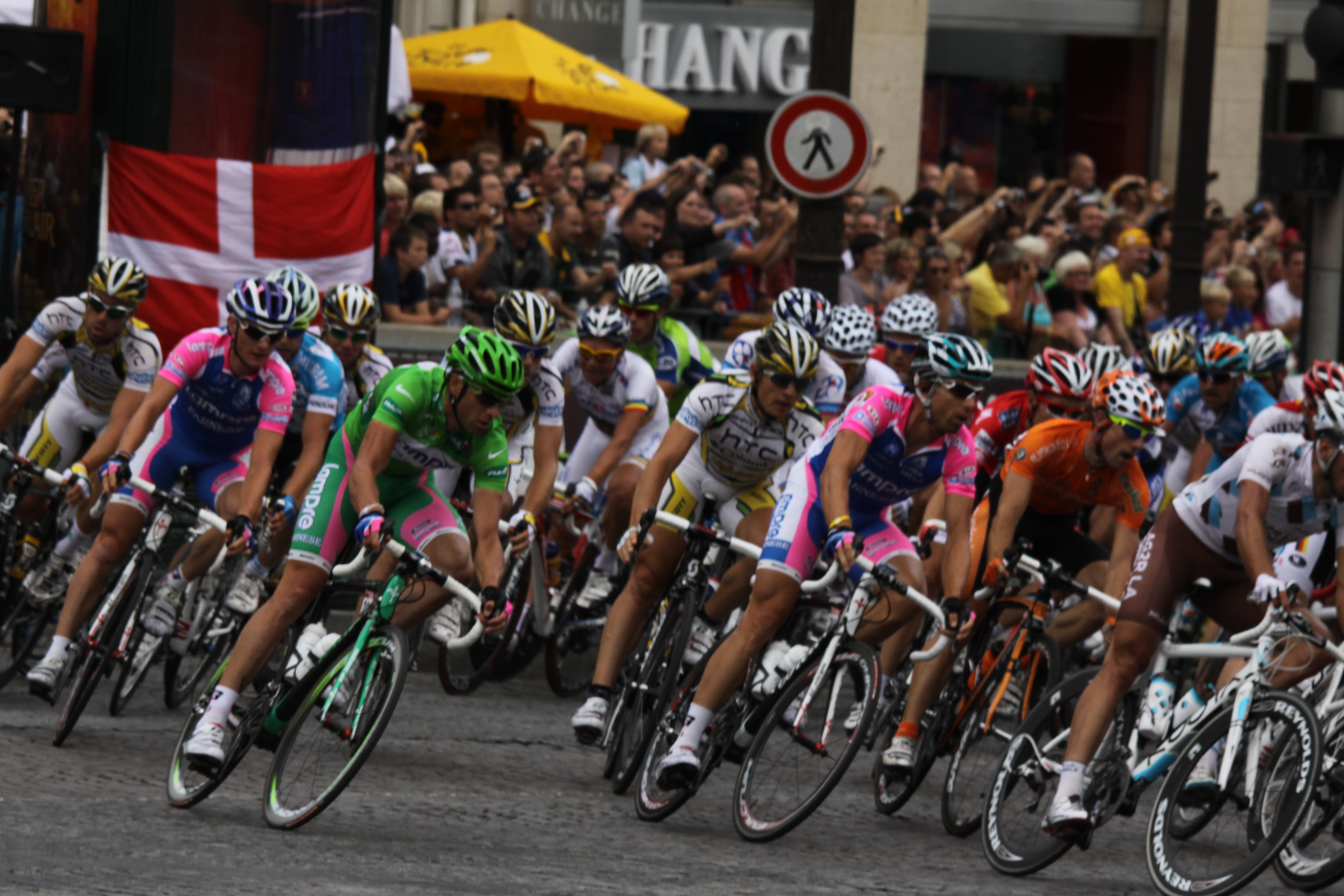
The 2010 Tour de France, Champs Élysées

Paris was the first city to host the Summer Olympics twice and the second to host three times, hosting in 1900, 1924 and 2024. The city also hosted the finals of the 1938 FIFA World Cup, 1998 FIFA World Cup, 2007 Rugby World Cup and 2023 Rugby World Cup, at the Stade de France. Paris hosted the finals of the 1960, 1984 and 2016 UEFA European Championships. Paris held six UEFA Champions League finals, including the 2022 edition.

The final stage of the Tour de France finishes in Paris; since 1975, the race has finished on the Champs-Elysées. Two annual tennis tournaments are held in Paris: the French Open, held every year on the red clay of the Stade Roland Garros, one of the four Grand Slam events of the world professional tennis tour, and the Paris Masters, held in the Bercy Arena.

Basketball teams Levallois SCB and Paris Basket Racing merged in 2007 to create club Metropolitans 92, which plays some of its games at the Stade Pierre de Coubertin. Paris also features Paris Basketball in Basketball, Paris Saint-Germain in handball and Paris Musketeers in American football.

== Infrastructure ==
=== Transport ===
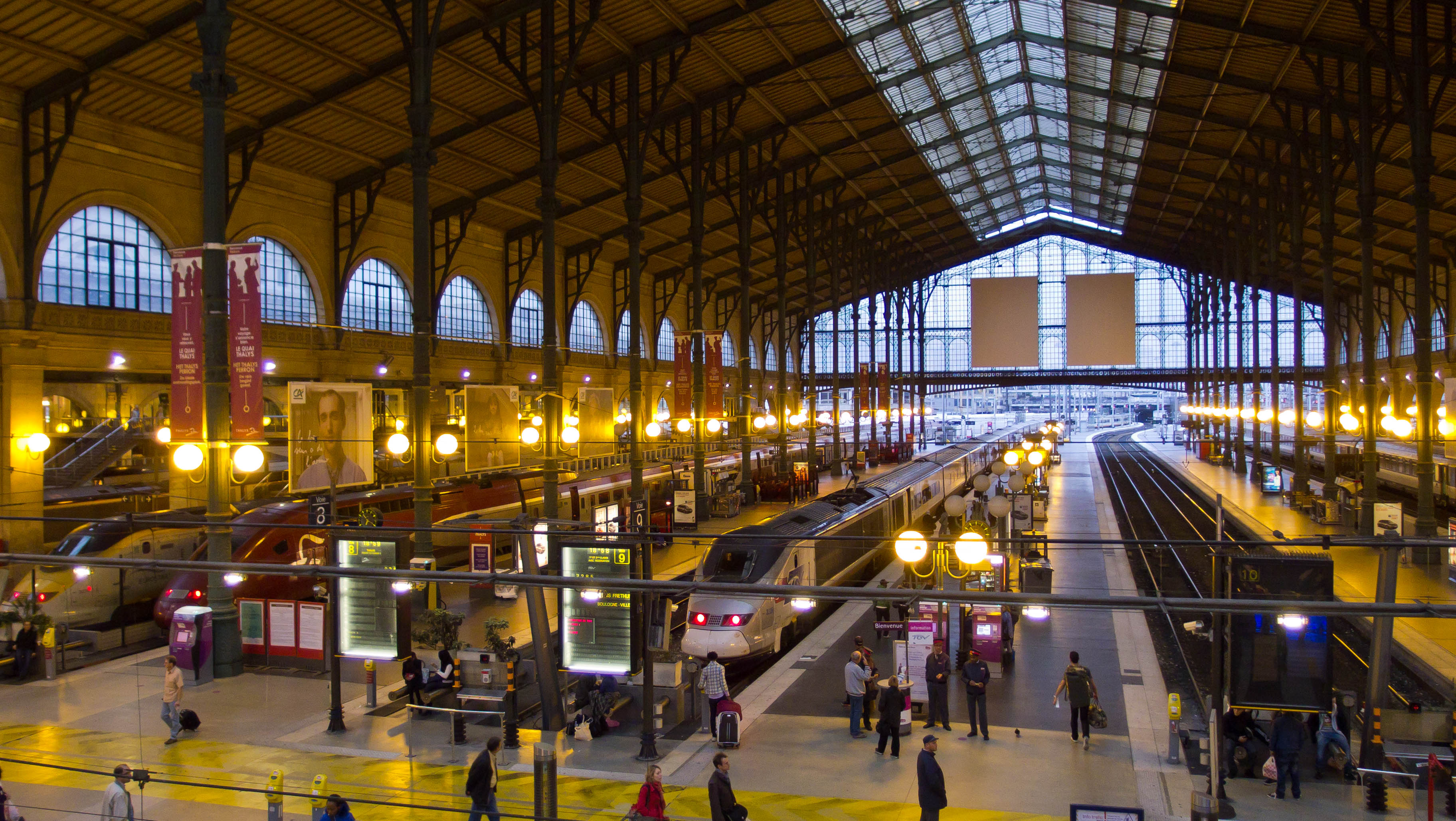
The Gare du Nord railway station is the busiest in Europe.

Paris is a major rail, highway, and air transport hub. The Île-de-France Mobilités (IDFM) oversees the transit network in the region. The syndicate coordinates public transport. The RATP operates 347 bus lines, the Métro, eight tramway lines, and sections of the RER. The SNCF operates suburban rails, one tramway line, and other sections of the RER. The Optile consortium of private operators manages 1,176 bus lines.

Paris has one of the most sustainable transportation systems in the world and is one of only two cities that received the Sustainable Transport Award twice, in 2008 and 2023. In 2022–2023, 53.3% of trips in Paris were made on foot, 30% on public transport, 11.2% on bicycles and 4.3% on cars. Paris has banned the most polluting automobiles from key districts and is doubling bike lanes. The concept of the 15-minute city was created by Carlos Moreno, a professor from Paris, and began to be implemented by its mayor Anne Hidalgo.

==== Walking ====
Paris is a highly walkable city and tries to increase its mode share beyond 53% of all trips in 2024. The number of trips made by foot in the Grand Paris metropolis increased by 50% from 2000 to 2018.

==== Railways ====
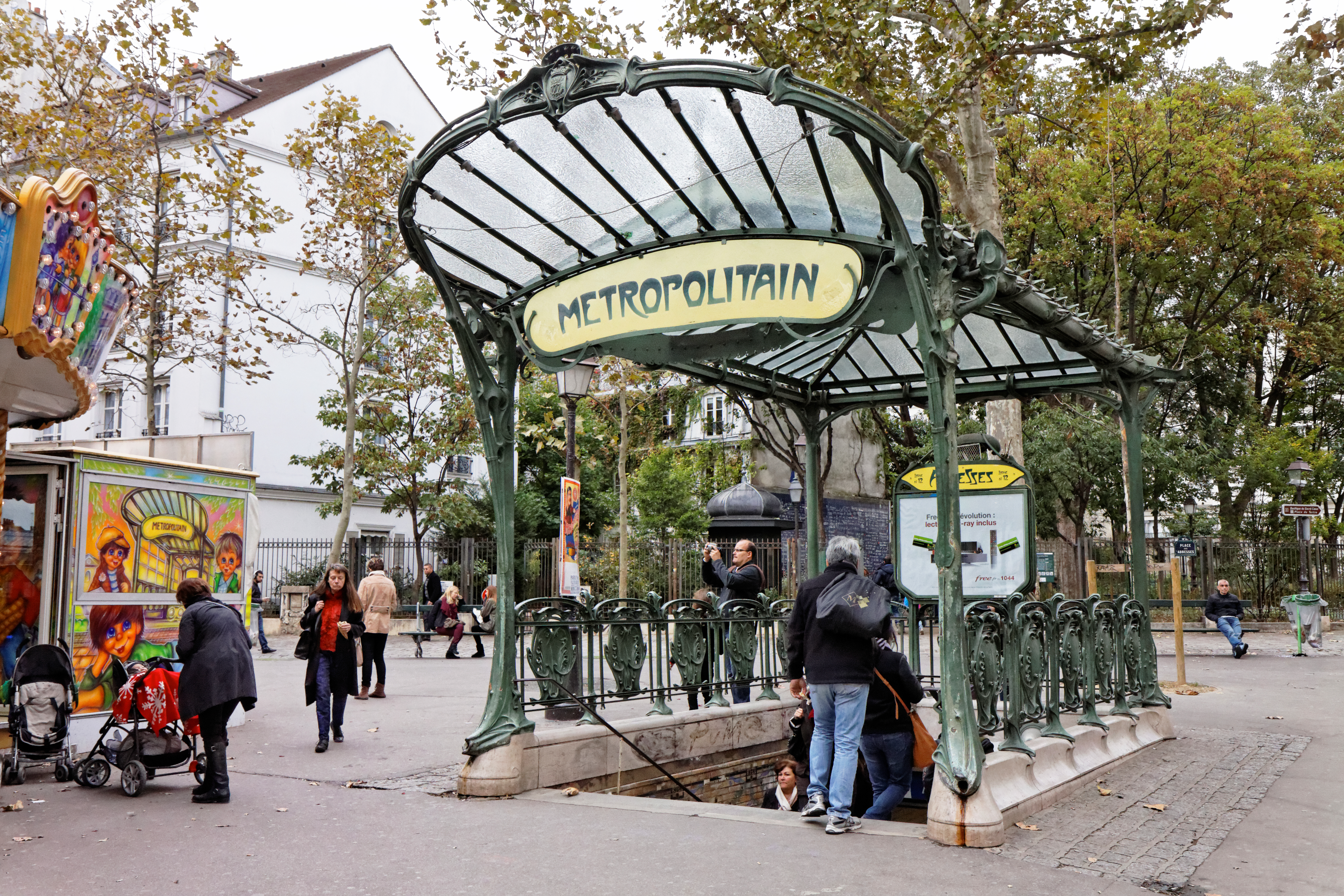
The Paris Métro is the busiest subway network in the European Union.

A central hub of the national rail network, Paris's six major railway stations (Gare du Nord, Gare de l'Est, Gare de Lyon, Gare d'Austerlitz, Gare Montparnasse, Gare Saint-Lazare) and a minor one (Gare de Bercy) are connected to three networks: high-speed rail lines (TGV inOui, TGV Lyria, TGV Ouigo, Eurostar, Intercity Express, Frecciarossa), normal speed trains (Intercités, Ouigo Train Classique, Intercités de nuit, European Sleeper, TER), and the suburban rails (Transilien). The Transilien is the commuter rail network serving Paris region, through 9 lines, 392 stations and 1,294 km (804.1 mi) of rails.

Since the inauguration of its first line in 1900, Paris's Métro network has grown to become the city's most widely used local transport system. In 2015, it carried about 5.23 million passengers daily. There are 16 lines, 321 stations (405 stops) and 245.6 km (152.6 mi) of rails. Superimposed on this is a regional express network, the RER, whose five lines, 257 stops, and 602 km (374 mi) of rails connect Paris to more distant parts of the urban area. With over 1.4 million passengers per day, RER A is the busiest metro line in Europe. The Paris region is served by a light rail network, the tramway. Opened in 1992, fifteen lines are now operational, spanning 196.6 kilometres (122.2 mi) with 283 stations.

==== Air ====
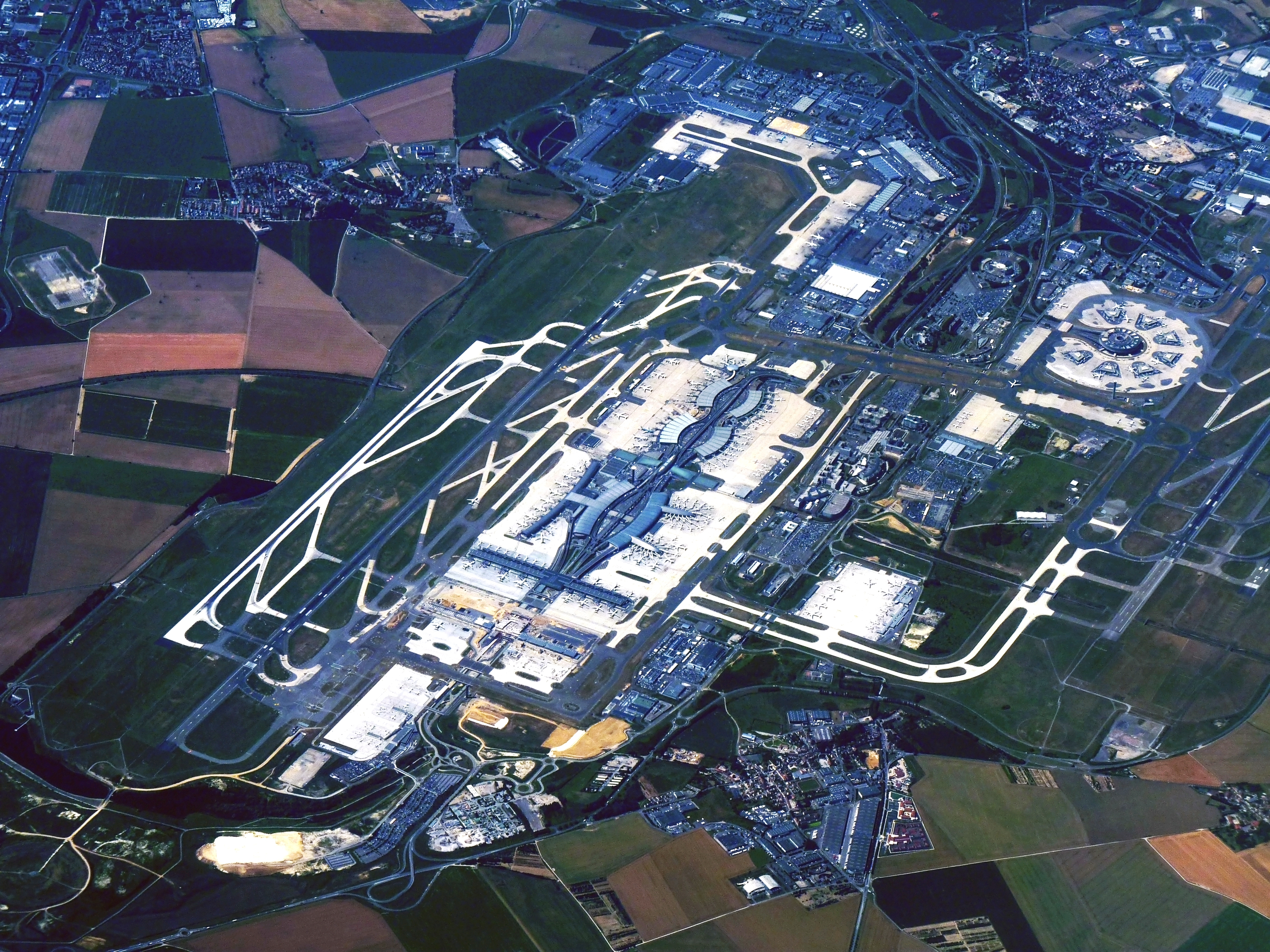
In 2023, Charles de Gaulle Airport was the third-busiest airport in Europe and the eleventh-busiest airport in the world.

Paris is served by three commercial international airports: Charles de Gaulle Airport, the third-busiest airport in Europe as of 2018, Orly Airport and Beauvais–Tillé Airport. In 2019, these three airports recorded traffic of 112 million passengers, making them the 5th busiest airport system in the world. There is also one general aviation airport, Paris–Le Bourget Airport, historically the oldest Parisian airport and closest to the city centre, which is now used only for private business flights and air shows. Charles de Gaulle Airport, located on the edge of the northern suburbs of Paris, opened to commercial traffic in 1974 and became the busiest Parisian airport in 1993. In 2023, it was the 4th busiest airport in the world by international traffic and it is the hub for the nation's flag carrier, Air France. Beauvais-Tillé Airport, located 69 km (43 mi) north of Paris's city centre, is used by charter airlines and low-cost carriers.

==== Motorways ====
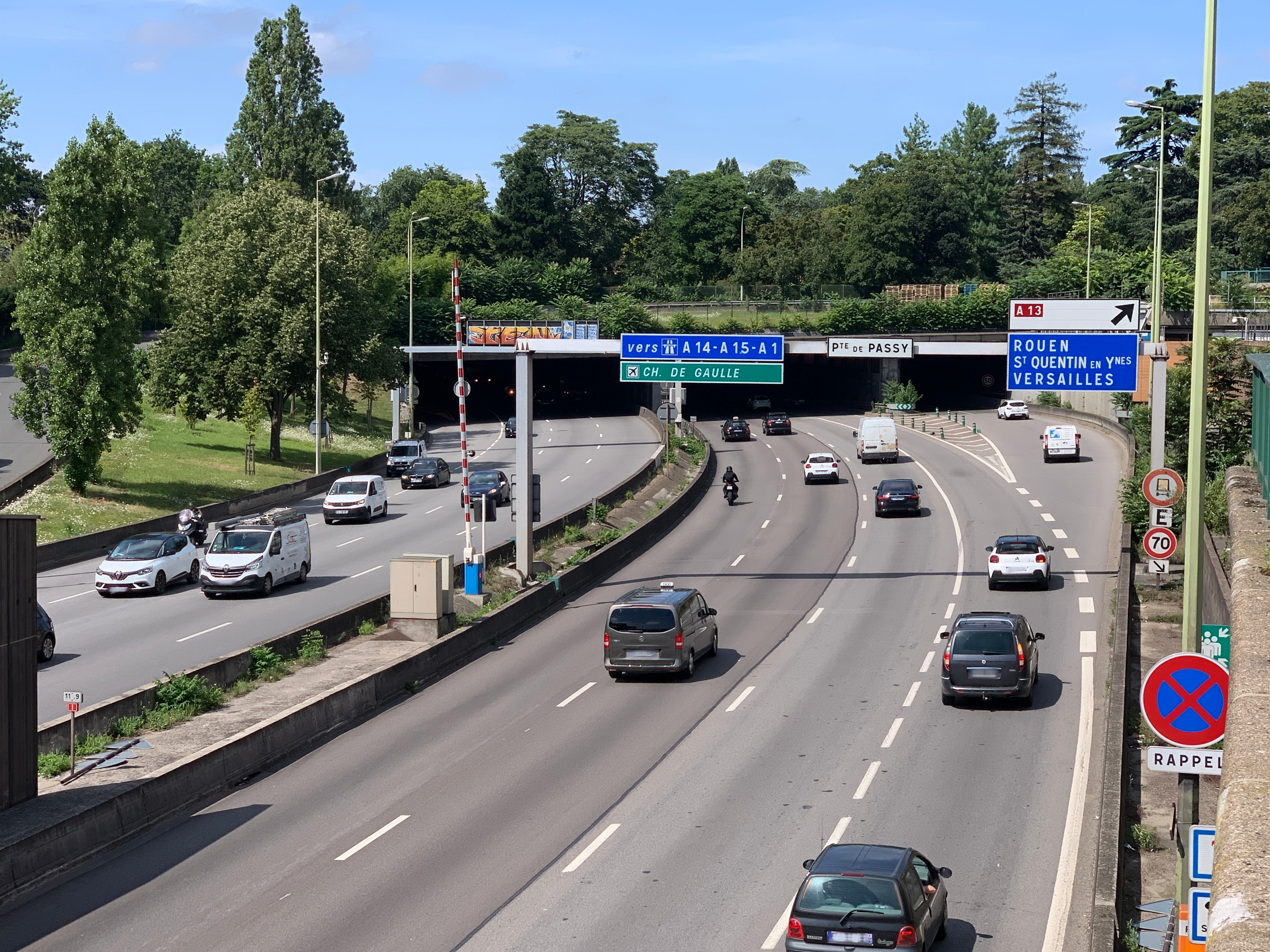
The Boulevard Périphérique

Paris is the most important hub of France's motorway network, and is surrounded by three orbital freeways: the Périphérique, which follows the approximate path of 19th-century fortifications around Paris, the A86 motorway in the inner suburbs, and the Francilienne motorway in the outer suburbs. Paris has an extensive road network with over 2,000 km (1,243 mi) of highways and motorways.

==== Waterways ====
The Paris region is the most active water transport area in France. Most of the cargo is handled by the Ports of Paris, in facilities located around Paris. The rivers Loire, Rhine, Rhône, Meuse, and Scheldt can be reached by canals connecting with the Seine, which include the Canal Saint-Martin, Canal Saint-Denis, and the Canal de l'Ourcq.

==== Cycling ====
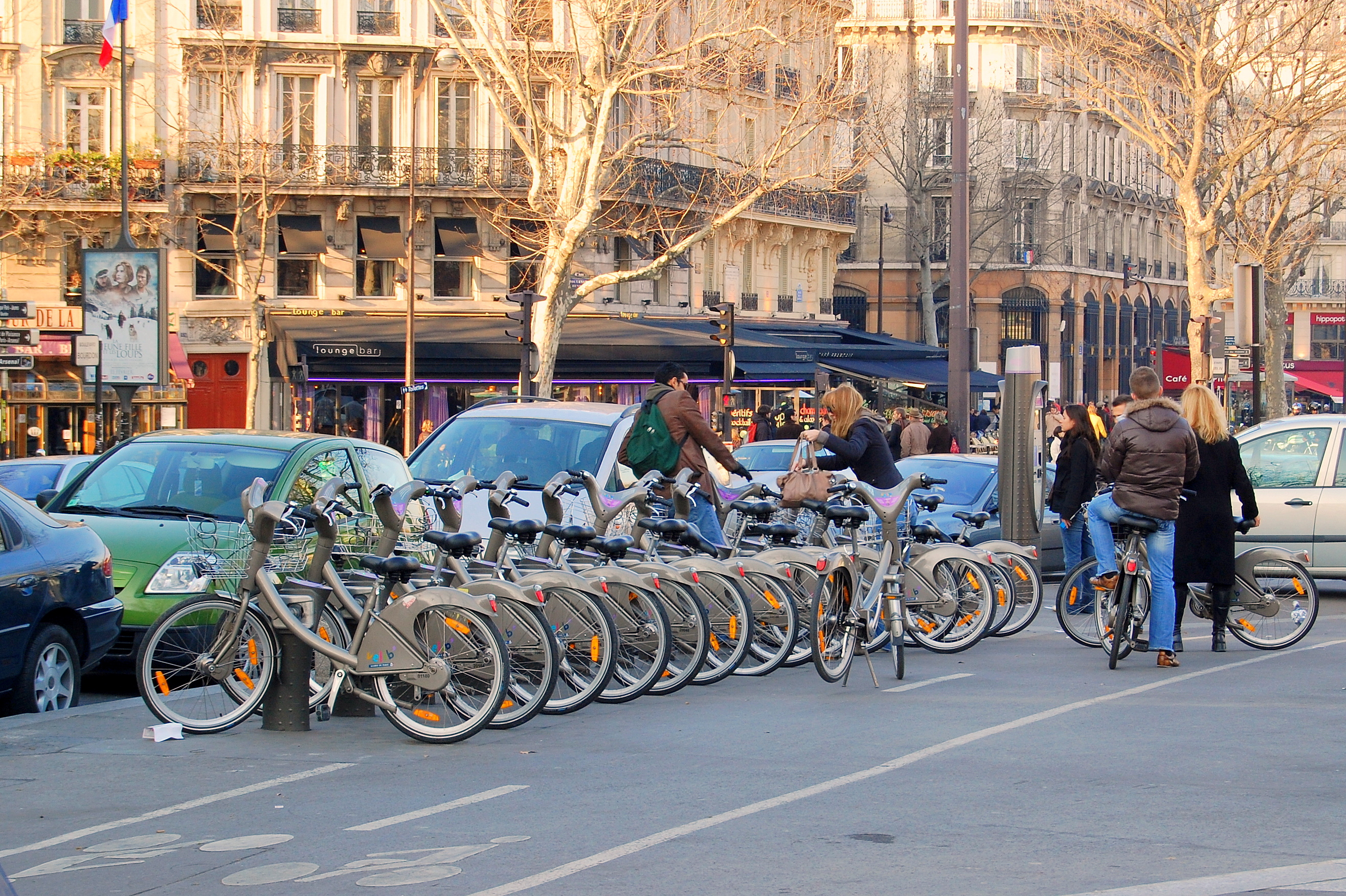
Vélib' at the Place de la Bastille

As of 2025 there were 1,565 km (972 mi) of cycle paths and routes in Paris. These include piste cyclable, bike lanes separated from other traffic by physical barriers, and bande cyclable, a bicycle lane denoted by a painted path on the road. Some 29 km (18 mi) of specially marked bus lanes are free for use by cyclists, with a protective barrier against encroachments from vehicles. Cyclists have the right to ride in both directions on certain one-way streets. Paris has a bike sharing system called Vélib' with more than 20,000 public bicycles distributed at 1,800 parking stations.

=== Electricity ===
In 2012, around 50% of electricity generated in the Île-de-France came from cogeneration energy plants. Other energy sources included thermal power (35%), waste incineration (9% – with cogeneration plants, these provide the city with heat as well), methane gas (5%), hydraulics (1%), and solar power (0.1%). A quarter of the city's district heating is to come from a plant in Saint-Ouen-sur-Seine, burning a 50/50-mix of coal and wood pellets.

=== Water and sanitation ===
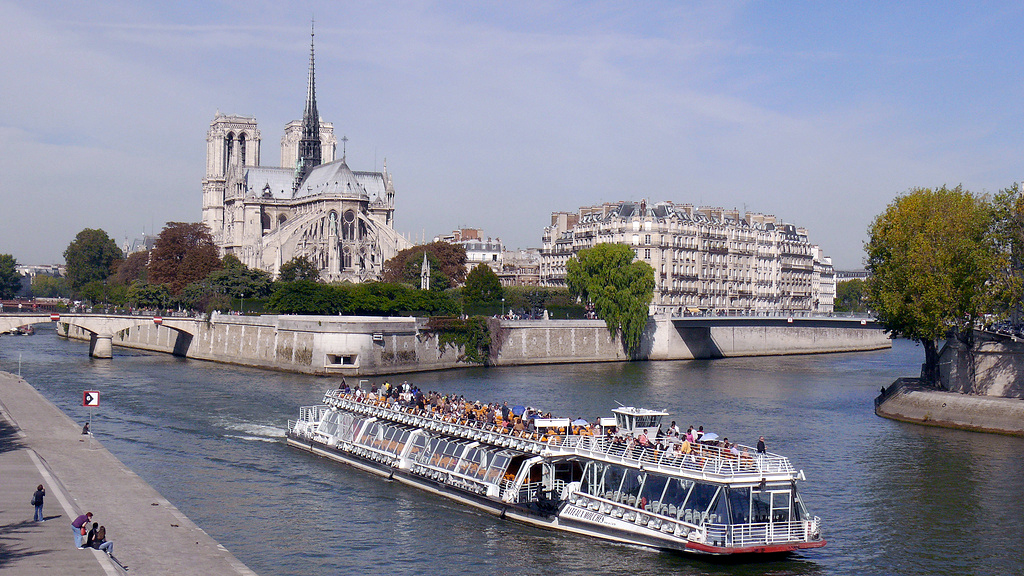
The Seine, the Île de la Cité and a Bateau Mouche

Paris in its early history had only the rivers Seine and Bièvre for water. From 1809, the Canal de l'Ourcq provided Paris with water from less-polluted rivers to the north-east of the capital. From 1857, the civil engineer Eugène Belgrand, under Napoleon III, oversaw the construction of a series of new aqueducts that brought water from locations all around the city to several reservoirs.

From then on, the new reservoir system became Paris's principal source of drinking water. The remains of the old system, pumped into lower levels of the same reservoirs, were from then on used for the cleaning of Paris's streets. This system is still a major part of Paris's water-supply network. Today, Paris has more than 2,400 km (1,491 mi) of underground sewers.

Air pollution in Paris, from the point of view of particulate matter (PM10), is the highest in France with 38 μg/m^{3}. Paris has one of the highest levels of nitrogen dioxide pollution in the EU.

=== Parks and gardens ===
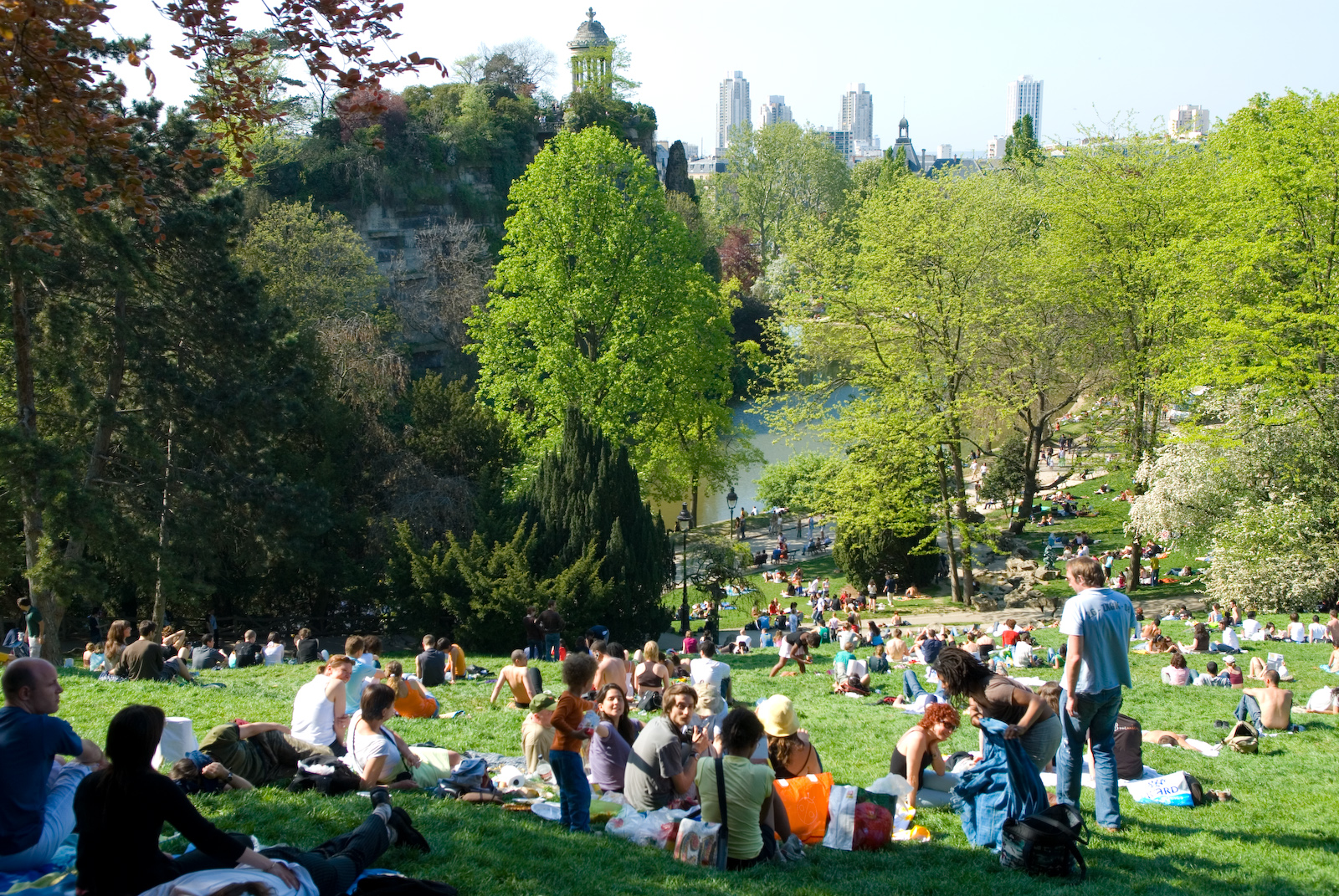
The lawns of the Parc des Buttes-Chaumont on a sunny day

Paris has more than 421 municipal parks and gardens, covering more than 3,000 hectares and containing more than 250,000 trees. Two of Paris's oldest and most famous gardens are the Tuileries Garden, created in 1564 for the Tuileries Palace and redone by André Le Nôtre between 1664 and 1672, and the Luxembourg Garden, for the Luxembourg Palace, built for Marie de' Medici in 1612, which today houses the Senate. The Jardin des plantes was the first botanical garden in Paris, created in 1626.

Between 1853 and 1870, Emperor Napoleon III and the city's first director of parks and gardens, Jean-Charles Adolphe Alphand, created the Bois de Boulogne, Bois de Vincennes, Parc Montsouris and Parc des Buttes-Chaumont, located at the four compass points around Paris, as well as many smaller parks, squares and gardens in the Paris's quarters. Since 1977, the city has created 166 new parks, most notably the Parc de la Villette (1987), Parc André Citroën (1992), Parc de Bercy (1997) and Parc Clichy-Batignolles (2007). One of the newest parks, the Promenade des Berges de la Seine (2013), has floating gardens.

=== Cemeteries ===
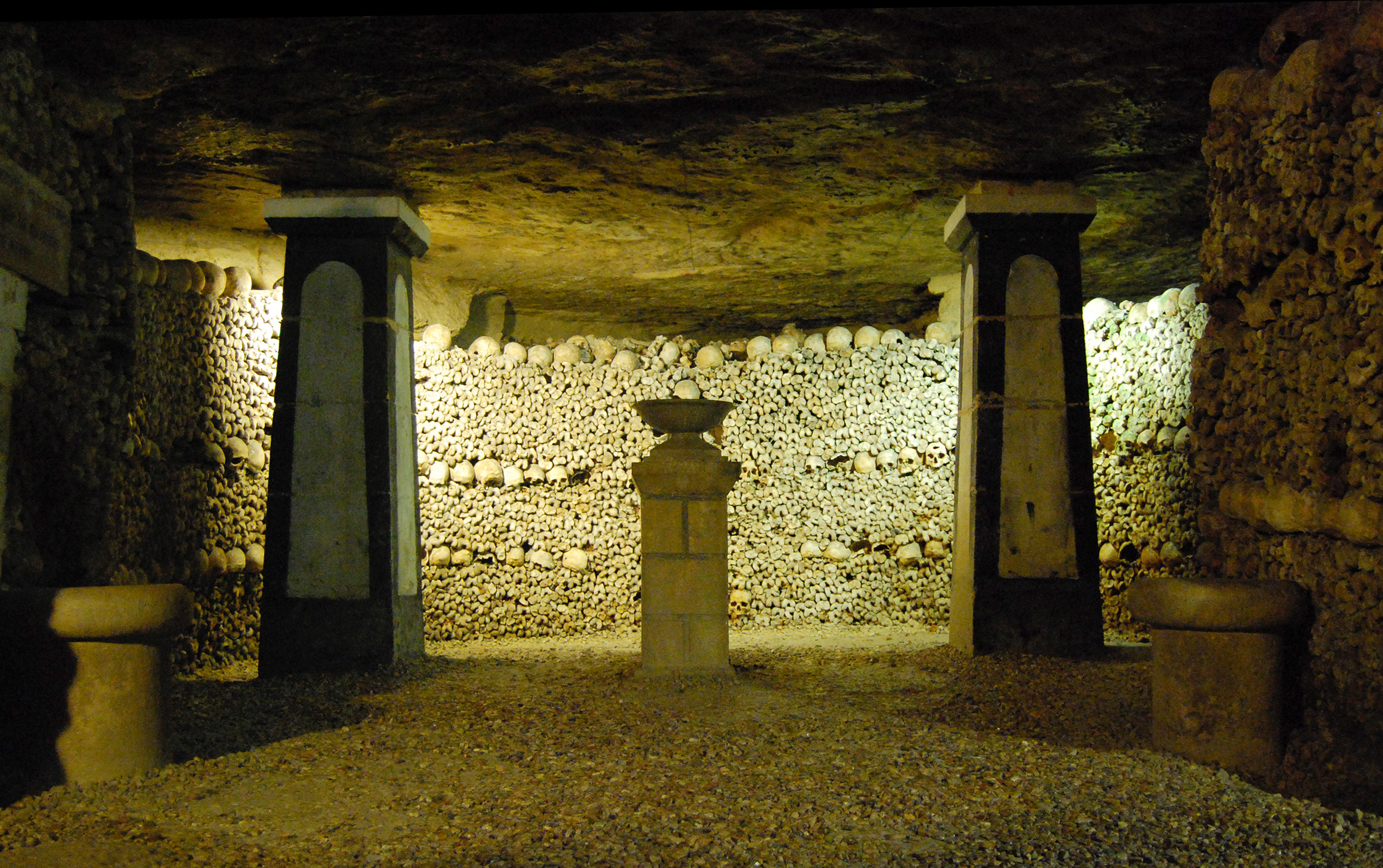
The Paris Catacombs hold the remains of approximately 6 million people.

During the Roman era, Paris's main cemetery was located on the outskirts of the left bank settlement. This changed with the rise of Catholic Christianity, where almost every inner-city church had adjoining burial grounds for use by their parishes. With Paris's growth, many of these, particularly the city's largest cemetery, the Holy Innocents' Cemetery, were filled to overflowing. When inner-city burials were condemned from 1786, the contents of all Paris's parish cemeteries were transferred to a renovated section of Paris's stone mines, today place Denfert-Rochereau in the 14th arrondissement.

After a tentative creation of several smaller suburban cemeteries, the Prefect Nicholas Frochot under Napoleon Bonaparte provided a more definitive solution in the creation of three massive Parisian cemeteries outside the city limits. Open from 1804, these were the cemeteries of Père Lachaise, Montmartre, Montparnasse, and later Passy. New suburban cemeteries were created in the early 20th century: The largest of these are the Cimetière parisien de Saint-Ouen, the Cimetière parisien de Pantin, also known as Cimetière parisien de Pantin-Bobigny, the Cimetière parisien d'Ivry, and the Cimetière parisien de Bagneux. Famous people buried in Parisian cemeteries include Oscar Wilde, Frédéric Chopin, Jim Morrison, Édith Piaf and Serge Gainsbourg.

=== Education ===
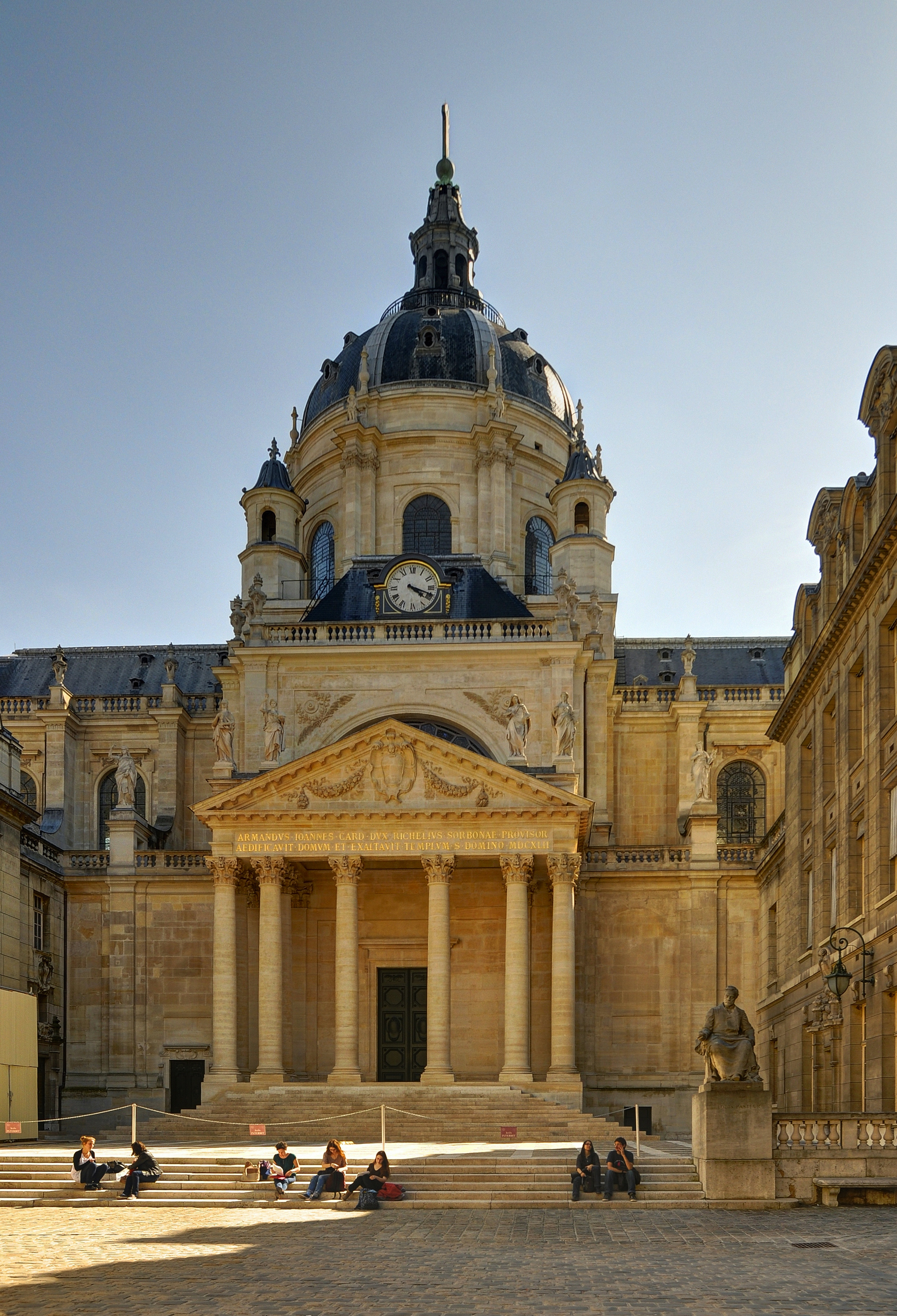
The Sorbonne University

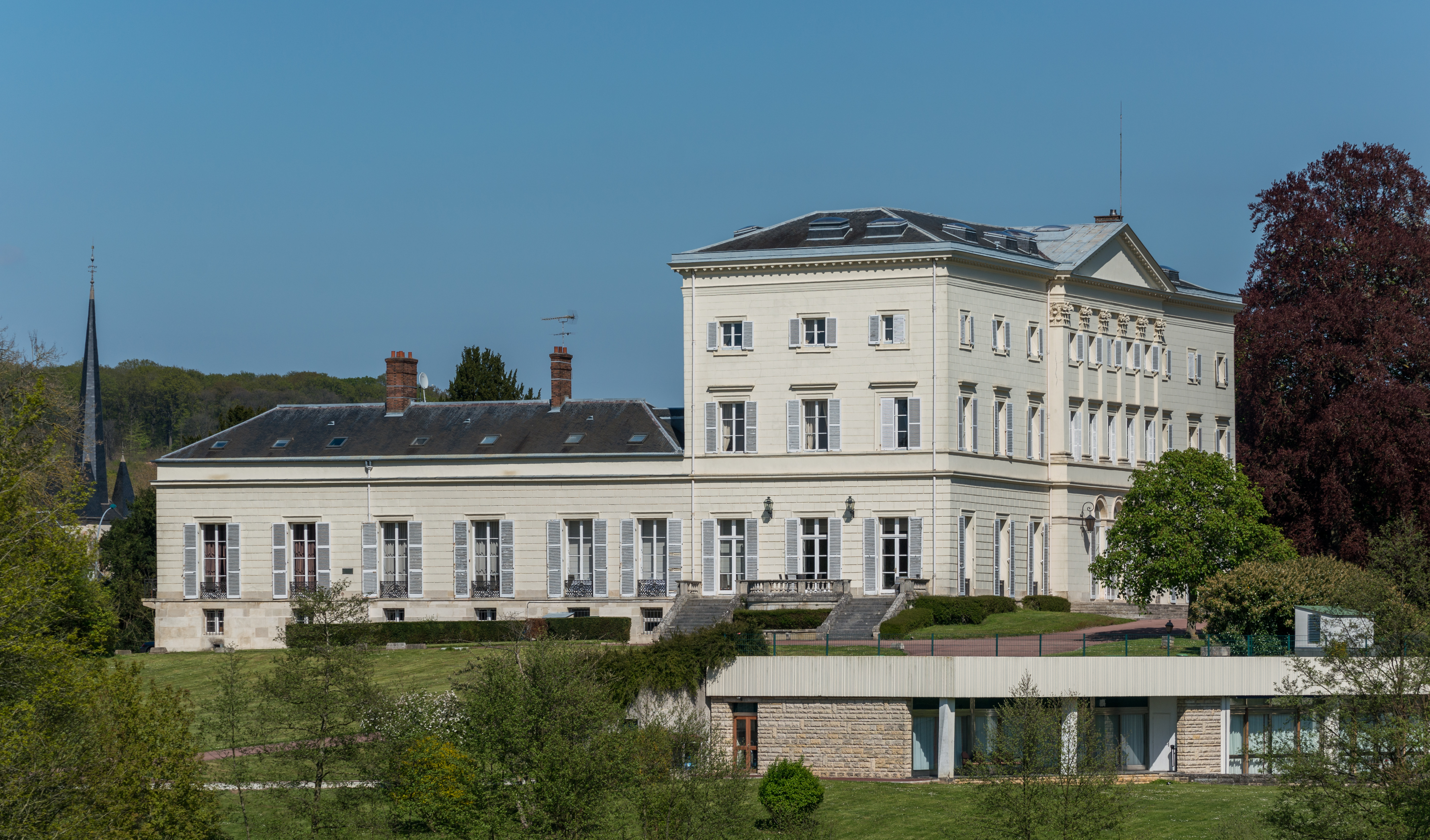
HEC Paris

In 2009, around 40 percent of Parisians held a licence-level diploma or higher, the highest proportion in France. 13 percent have no diploma, the third-lowest percentage in France. Education in Paris and the Île-de-France region employs approximately 330,000 people, 170,000 of whom are teachers and professors, teaching approximately 2.9 million students in around 9,000 primary, secondary, and higher education schools and institutions.

The University of Paris, founded in the 12th century, is often called the Sorbonne after one of its original medieval colleges. In 1970, it was broken up into thirteen autonomous universities following the student demonstrations in 1968. Most of the campuses today are in the Latin Quarter, where the old university was located, while others are scattered around the city and the suburbs.

The Paris region hosts France's highest concentration of the grandes écoles – 55 specialised centres of higher education outside or inside the public university structure. The prestigious public universities are usually considered grands établissements. Most of the grandes écoles were relocated to the suburbs of Paris in the 1960s and 1970s, in new campuses much larger than the old campuses within the crowded City of Paris. The École Normale Supérieure, PSL University has remained on rue d'Ulm in the 5th arrondissement.

Paris is the home of prestigious universities in science and technology (Conservatoire national des arts et métiers, Polytechnic Institute of Paris, Paris Cité University, Paris-Saclay University, Sorbonne University), political science (Sciences Po), management (HEC Paris, ESSEC Business School, ESCP Business School, INSEAD) archaeology, art history, anthropology and epigraphy (École du Louvre), as well as multidisciplinary universities (Paris Sciences et Lettres University).

=== Healthcare ===
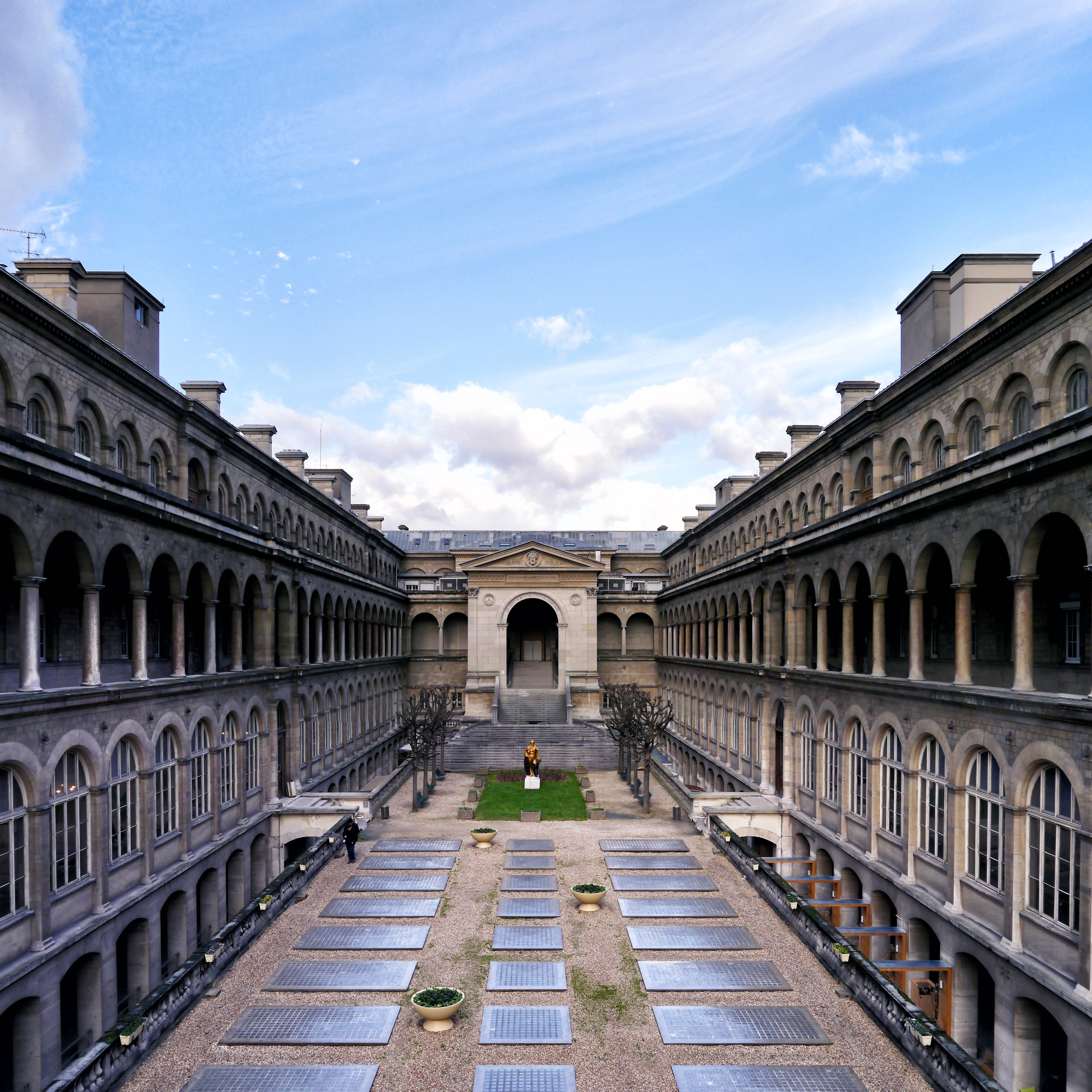
The Hôtel-Dieu de Paris is the oldest hospital in Paris.

Health care and emergency medical service in the City of Paris and its suburbs are provided by the Assistance publique – Hôpitaux de Paris (AP-HP), a public hospital system that employs more than 90,000 people, including practitioners, support personnel, and administrators, in 44 hospitals. It is the largest hospital system in Europe. The hospitals receive more than 5.8 million annual patient visits.

One of the most notable hospitals is the Hôtel-Dieu, founded in 651, the oldest hospital in Paris and the oldest worldwide still operating, although the current building is the product of a reconstruction of 1877. Other hospitals include Pitié-Salpêtrière Hospital, one of the largest in Europe, Hôpital Cochin, Bichat–Claude Bernard Hospital, Hôpital Européen Georges-Pompidou, Bicêtre Hospital, Beaujon Hospital, the Curie Institute, Lariboisière Hospital, Necker–Enfants Malades Hospital, Hôpital Saint-Louis, Hôpital de la Charité and the American Hospital of Paris.

== International relations ==
=== International organisations ===
The United Nations Educational, Scientific and Cultural Organization (UNESCO) has had its headquarters in Paris since November 1958. Paris is also the home of the Organisation for Economic Co-operation and Development (OECD). Paris hosts the headquarters of the European Space Agency, the International Energy Agency, European Securities and Markets Authority and the European Banking Authority.

=== Twin towns – sister cities ===
Since April 1956, Paris is exclusively and reciprocally twinned with Rome, Italy.

Seule Paris est digne de Rome; seule Rome est digne de Paris. (in French)
Solo Parigi è degna di Roma; solo Roma è degna di Parigi. (in Italian)
"Only Paris is worthy of Rome; only Rome is worthy of Paris."

=== Other relationships ===
Paris has agreements of friendship and co-operation with:

- Algiers, 2003
- Amman, 1987
- Amsterdam, 2013
- Athens, 2000
- Beijing, 1997
- Beirut, 1992
- Berlin, 1987
- Brazzaville, 2015
- Buenos Aires, 1999
- Cairo, 1985
- Casablanca, 2004
- Chicago, 1996
- Copenhagen, 2005
- Dakar, 2011
- Doha, 2010
- Geneva, 2002
- Istanbul, 2009
- Jakarta, 1995
- Jericho, 2009
- Kinshasa, 2014
- Kyoto, 1958
- Lisbon, 1998
- London, 2001
- Madrid, 2000
- Mexico City, 1999
- Montevideo, 2013
- Montreal, 2006
- Moscow, 1992
- Phnom Penh, 2007
- Porto Alegre, 2001
- Prague, 1997
- Quebec City, 1996
- Rabat, 2004
- Ramallah, 2011
- Rio de Janeiro, 2009
- Riyadh, 1997
- Saint Petersburg, 1997
- Sanaa, 1987
- San Francisco, 1996
- Santiago, 1997
- São Paulo, 2004
- Seoul, 1991
- Sofia, 1998
- Sydney, 1998
- Tbilisi, 1997
- Tel Aviv, 2010
- Tokyo, 1982
- Tunis, 2004
- Warsaw, 1999
- Washington, D.C., 2000
- Yerevan, 1998

== In popular culture ==
Paris has been the setting for many movies, TV shows, and other forms of media, including the Netflix streaming series Emily in Paris and the kids' animated superhero show Miraculous Ladybug.

== See also ==
- Art Nouveau in Paris
- Art Deco in Paris
- C40 Cities Climate Leadership Group
- International Exposition of Modern Industrial and Decorative Arts held in Paris in 1925
- Megacity
- Outline of France
- Outline of Paris
- Paris syndrome
- Parish and Civil Registers in Paris
