= Departmental Council of Essonne =

Departmental legislature in France

The Departmental Council of Essonne (French: Conseil départemental de l'Essonne) is the deliberative assembly of the Essonne department in the region of Île-de-France. It consists of 42 members (general councilors) from 21 cantons and its headquarters are in Évry-Courcouronnes.

The President of the General Council is François Durovray.

== Governance ==
=== List of presidents ===
List of successive presidents of the Departmental Council of Essonne
In office		Name	Party	Capacity	Ref.
1967	1976	Pierre Prost	SE		
1976	1982	Robert Lakota	PCF		
1982	1988	Jean Simonin	RPR		
1988	1998	Xavier Dugoin	RPR		
1998	2011	Michel Berson	PS		
1998	2011	Michel Berson	DVG		
2011	2015	Jérôme Guedj	PS		
2015	present	François Durovray	UMP		
2015	present	François Durovray	LR		

=== Vice-Presidents ===
The President of the Departmental Council is assisted by 12 vice-presidents chosen from among the departmental advisers. Each of them has a delegation of authority.

List of vice-presidents of the Essonne Departmental Council (as of 2021)
Order	Name	Party	Canton	Delegation
1st	Michel Bournat	UD	Gif-sur-Yvette	Partnerships with territories, higher education, research and transversal projects
2nd	Sandrine Gelot	UC	Longjumeau	Culture, sports, youth and community life
3rd	Nicolas Méary	UCD	Brétigny-sur-Orge	Biodiversity and ecological transition
4th	Sophie Rigault	UCD	Brétigny-sur-Orge	Mobility and roads
5th	Patrick Imbert	DVD	Mennecy	Region's attractiveness
6th	Brigitte Vermillet	LR	Savigny-sur-Orge	Housing and departmental heritage Departmental
7th	Alexander Touzet	UCD	Arpajon	Citizenship, prevention and security
8th	Marie-Claire Chambaret	DVD	Étampes	Autonomy
9th	Jérôme Berenger	UCD	Viry-Châtillon	Colleges and educational success
10th	Dany Boyer	DVC	Dourdan	Family, solidarity and integration
11th	Nicolas Samsoen	DVD	Massy	Finances and the effectiveness of public policies
12th	Dominique Bougraud	UCD	Arpajon	Human resources and general affairs
