= Stéphanie Atger =

French politician (born 1958)

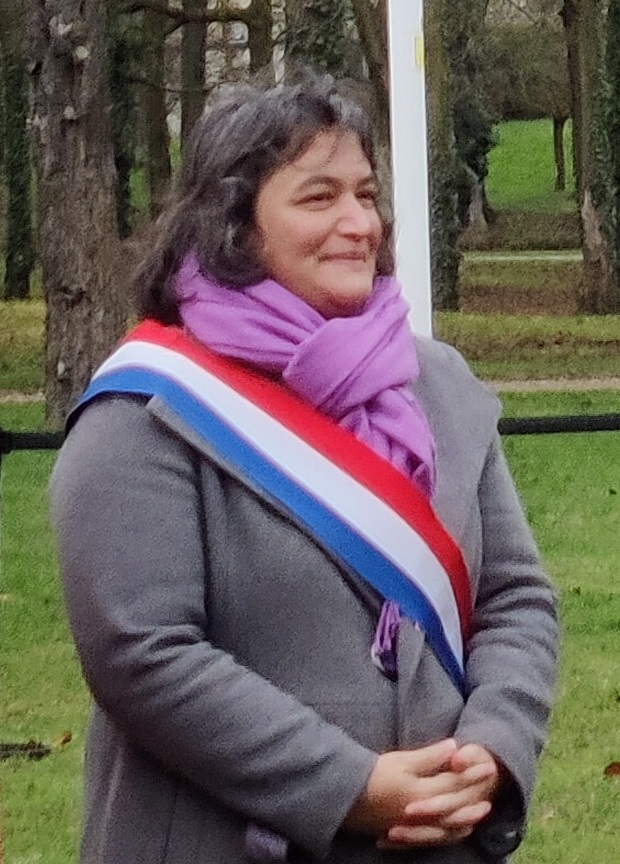
- Atger in 2022

Member of the National Assembly for Essonne's 6th constituency
- In office 1 May 2019 – 21 June 2022
- Preceded by: Amélie de Montchalin
- Succeeded by: Jérôme Guedj

Personal details
- Born: 11 October 1975 (age 50) Sarcelles, Val-d'Oise, France
- Party: LREM; Territories of Progress
- Education: University of Paris 1 Panthéon-Sorbonne

Stéphanie Atger (born 11 October 1975) is a French politician of La République En Marche! (LREM) who was member of the National Assembly from 2019 until 2022, representing Essonne's 6th constituency.

== Biography and Political career ==
Born into a family of Martiniquais and Savoyard descent through her mother and Polynesian descent through her father, Stéphanie Atger is originally from Seine-Saint-Denis. From 2001 to 2008, she served as Deputy Mayor of Pierrefitte-sur-Seine, responsible for children's and early childhood services. She also worked as a member of the cabinet of the President of the Seine-Saint-Denis General Council and later served as Chief of Staff to Maud Olivier, the Socialist Party mayor of Les Ulis. Before becoming a Member of Parliament, she was Director of the Citizenship, Community Engagement and Events Department at the Les Ulis municipal administration. A contractual public-sector employee and public writer, she has lived in Chilly-Mazarin since 2007.

A member of the Socialist Party until May 2014, she joined En Marche at the end of 2016.

Atger became a member of the National Assembly in May 2019 when Amélie de Montchalin was appointed Minister of Europe and Foreign Affairs. As her substitute, Atger took her place in the Assembly.

In July 2019, Atger voted in favor of the French ratification of the European Union’s Comprehensive Economic and Trade Agreement (CETA) with Canada.

In parliament, Atger served on the Committee on Cultural Affairs and Education from 2019 until 2020 before moving to the Committee on Social Affairs. She ran alongside Lionel Savoye as a candidate in the 2021 departmental elections in the canton of Massy. The pair were eliminated in the first round with 7.42% of the vote.

In the 2022 French legislative election, incumbent MP Amélie de Montchalin selected Pierre Ollier, Deputy Mayor of Massy, as her substitute candidate. Stéphanie Atger was therefore not retained in that role.

== Political positions ==
- Member of the National Assembly for Essonne's 6th constituency (2019–2022).
- Municipal Councillor of Chilly-Mazarin, responsible for local democracy and communications (2008–2014).
- Deputy Mayor of Pierrefitte-sur-Seine, responsible for childhood and early childhood affairs (2001–2008).
