= Essonne's 6th constituency =

Constituency of the National Assembly of France

6th constituency of Essonne
- inline Constituency of the National Assembly of France

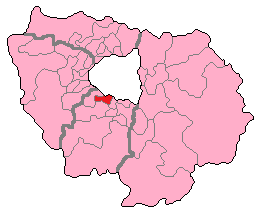
- Essonne's 6th Constituency shown within Île-de-France
- Deputy: Jérôme Guedj; PS
- Department: Essonne
- Cantons: Chilly-Mazarin, Massy-Est, Massy-Ouest, Palaiseau
- Registered voters: 81,934

The 6th constituency of Essonne is a French legislative constituency in the Essonne département.

== Description ==
The 6th constituency of Essonne is in the north of the department it is a dense urban seat centred on the suburb of Massy. The seat was created in 1986 as the number of seats in Essonne grew from four to ten reflecting the rapidly increasing population and urbanisation of the department.

Historically the seat has favoured the left the PS having won at every election except 1993 and 2017.

== Historic Representation ==
Election	Member	Party	Notes
1988	Claude Germon	PS	
1993	Odile Moirin	RPR	
1997	François Lamy	PS	
2002	François Lamy	PS	
2007	François Lamy	PS	
2012	François Lamy	PS	Appointed Junior Minister for Urban Affairs
2012	Jérôme Guedj	PS	Substitute for Lamy
2014	François Lamy	PS	Left government role
2017	Amélie De Montchalin	LREM	Appointed Minister of Europe and Foreign Affairs
2019	Stéphanie Atger	LREM	Substitute for De Montchalin
2022	Jérôme Guedj	PS	

== Election results ==
=== 2024 ===
Candidate	Party	Alliance	First round			Second round		
Candidate	Party	Alliance	Votes	%	+/–	Votes	%	+/–
Jérôme Guedj	PS	NFP	19,280	34.44	-3.87	38,991	74.29	+20.93
Hella Kribi-Romdhane	G.s-LFI diss.		14,124	25.23	N/A	WITHDREW		
Natacha Goupy	RN		11,650	20.81	+10.19	13,515	25.74	N/A
Chantal Lacarrière Farges	DIV		8,119	14.50	N/A			
Aloïs Lang-Rousseau	DVE		1,455	2.60	N/A			
Francine Monnier	REC		1,075	1.92	-2.10			
Bastien Vayssière	LO		280	0.50	-0.49			
Valid votes			55,983	98.16	-0.13	52,506	95.04	-0.16
Blank votes			817	1.43	+0.22	2,194	3.97	+0.54
Null votes			231	0.41	-0.09	544	0.98	-0.38
Turnout			57,031	68.44	+18.26	55,244	66.28	+16.13
Abstentions			26,293	31.56	-18.26	28,102	33.72	-16.13
Registered voters			83,324			83,346		
Source: Ministry of the Interior, Le Monde
Result						PS HOLD		

=== 2022 ===
Legislative Election 2022: Essonne's 6th constituency
Party	Candidate	Votes	%	±%
PS (NUPÉS)	Jérôme Guedj	15,730	38.31	+9.62
LREM (Ensemble)	Amélie De Montchalin	12,915	31.46	-7.34
RN	Lisa Haddad	4,361	10.62	+2.90
LR (UDC)	Chantal Lacarriere	2,448	5.96	−7.77
REC	Wendy Lonchampt	1,650	4.02	N/A
DVD	Mokrane Sahari	1,189	2.90	N/A
Others	N/A	2,764		
Turnout		41,770	50.18	−0.13
2nd round result
PS (NUPÉS)	Jérôme Guedj	21,213	53.36	N/A
LREM (Ensemble)	Amélie De Montchalin	18,543	46.64	−14.70
Turnout		39,756	50.15	+14.07
PS gain from LREM				

=== 2017 ===
Legislative Election 2017: Essonne's 6th constituency
Party	Candidate	Votes	%	±%
LREM	Amélie De Montchalin	15,993	38.80	
UDI	Françoise Couasse	5,661	13.73	
PS	Jérôme Guedj	5,385	13.06	
LFI	Philippe Juraver	4,792	11.63	
FN	Nathalie Paulin	3,181	7.72	
EELV	Anne-Charlotte Bénichou	1,647	4.00	
DLF	Françoise Fernandes	870	2.11	
Others	N/A	3,689		
Turnout		41,218	50.31	
2nd round result
LREM	Amélie De Montchalin	18,132	61.34	
UDI	Françoise Couasse	11,429	38.66	
Turnout		29,561	36.08	
LREM gain from PS		Swing		

=== 2012 ===
Legislative Election 2012: Essonne's 6th constituency
Party	Candidate	Votes	%	±%
PS	François Lamy	18,016	40.61	
UMP	Grégoire de Lasteyrie	9,650	21.75	
FN	Cédric Giraud	5,091	11.48	
PRV	Nicolas Samsoen	5,085	11.46	
FG	Colette Jan	2,977	6.71	
EELV	Michel Rouyer	2,207	4.97	
Others	N/A	1,340		
Turnout		44,366	58.21	
2nd round result
PS	François Lamy	23,941	57.77	
UMP	Grégoire de Lasteyrie	17,500	42.23	
Turnout		41,441	54.37	
PS hold				

=== 2007 ===
Legislative Election 2007: Essonne's 6th constituency
Party	Candidate	Votes	%	±%
UMP	Véronique Carantois	17,906	39.59	
PS	François Lamy	15,409	34.07	
MoDem	Cédric Morgantini	5,153	11.39	
PCF	Serge Guichard	2,199	4.86	
FN	Jacqueline Met	1,561	3.45	
LV	Claudine Bourhis	1,453	3.21	
Others	N/A	1,548		
Turnout		45,793	62.70	
2nd round result
PS	François Lamy	22,913	52.64	
UMP	Véronique Carantois	20,615	47.36	
Turnout		44,671	61.16	
PS hold				

=== 2002 ===
Legislative Election 2002: Essonne's 6th constituency
Party	Candidate	Votes	%	±%
PS	François Lamy	15,639	34.85	
UMP	Véronique Carantois	10,093	22.49	
UDF	Vincent Delahaye	8,851	19.73	
FN	Josselyne Top	3,876	8.64	
PCF	Serge Guichard	1,487	3.31	
LV	Guy Bonneau	1,236	2.75	
Others	N/A	3,688		
Turnout		45,393	67.03	
2nd round result
PS	François Lamy	21,428	51.54	
UMP	Véronique Carantois	20,150	48.46	
Turnout		42,779	63.18	
PS hold				

=== 1997 ===
Legislative Election 1997: Essonne's 6th constituency
Party	Candidate	Votes	%	±%
RPR	Odile Moirin	12,180	28.18	
PS	François Lamy	12,074	27.93	
FN	Roger Douce	5,926	13.71	
PCF	Serge Guichard	3,810	8.81	
LV	Guy Bonneau	2,358	5.46	
DVD	Didier Leboiteux	1,348	3.12	
LO	Jacques Mazars	1,213	2.81	
GE	Josiane Rouland	1,137	2.63	
MRC	Monique Duboué	913	2.11	
Others	N/A	2,267		
Turnout		44,824	66.28	
2nd round result
PS	François Lamy	24,364	53.12	
RPR	Odile Moirin	21,505	46.88	
Turnout		48,183	71.25	
PS gain from RPR				

== Sources ==
Official results of French elections from 2002: "Résultats électoraux officiels en France" (in French).
