= Jérôme Guedj =

French politician (born 1972)

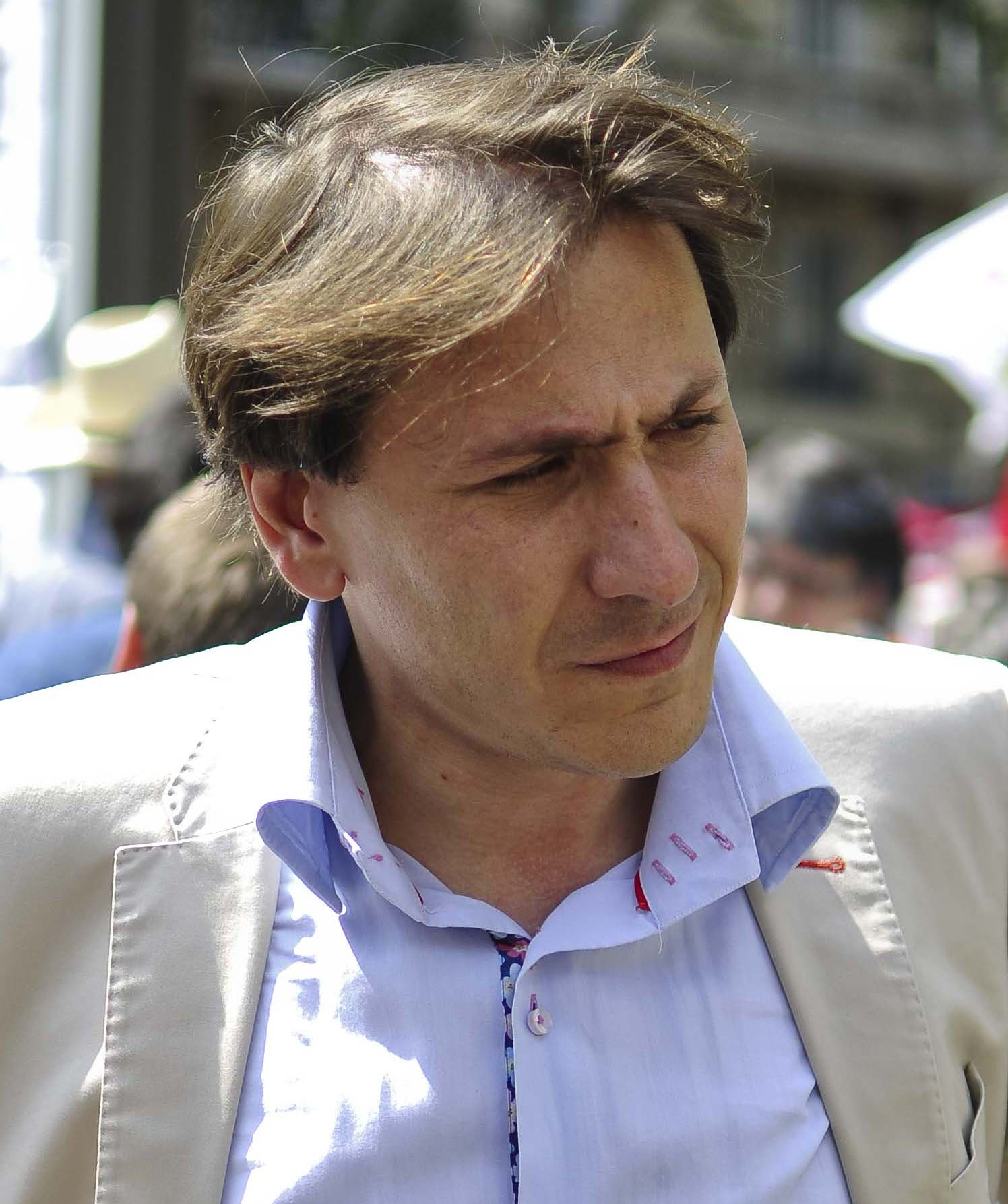
- Jérôme Guedj in 2010

Member of the National Assembly for Essonne's 6th constituency
- Incumbent
- Assumed office 22 June 2022
- Preceded by: Stéphanie Atger
- In office 22 July 2012 – 2 May 2014
- Preceded by: François Lamy
- Succeeded by: François Lamy

Member of the Regional Council of Île-de-France
- Incumbent
- Assumed office 2 July 2021
- President: Valérie Pécresse

President of the Departmental Council of Essonne
- In office 2011–2015
- Preceded by: Michel Berson
- Succeeded by: François Durovray

Personal details
- Born: 23 January 1972 (age 54) Pantin, France
- Party: Socialist Party
- Education: Sciences Po, ÉNA

Jérôme Guedj (born 23 January 1972, in Pantin) is a French politician. He is a member of the Socialist Party.

== Education and training ==
Jérôme Guedj comes from an Algerian Sephardic family. His father, Jean-Pierre Guedj, is a physiotherapist in Essonne and a deputy mayor of Massy. Guedj's father headed the city's Jewish community.

Jérôme Guedj holds a Baccalauréat C (science stream), is a graduate of the Institut d'études politiques de Paris (Sciences Po) (Class of 1992), and is an alumnus of the École nationale d'administration (Victor Schœlcher Class, 1996).

== Career ==
Upon completion of his studies at ENA, Guedj joined the Inspection générale des affaires sociales (IGAS). During the 2000s, he co-directed, along with jurist Maryvonne Lyazid, an Executive Master's program at Sciences Po that focused on disability policy.

Guedj serves as the manager of the company J G Conseils, established on 1 February 2006. This company, based in Massy, Essonne, provides consulting services to local authorities, public administrations, associations, and businesses.

He was a member of the 2013 cohort of the France China Foundation’s "Young Leaders" program, where he associated with Emmanuel Macron, Chantal Jouanno, Édouard Philippe, and Matthias Fekl.

In 2018, he founded a consulting firm, counting the Korian group among his clients.—initially based in the 6th arrondissement and later in the 14th arrondissement.

In late March 2020, amidst the COVID-19 pandemic, Minister of Health Olivier Véran tasked him with a mission regarding the isolation of elderly people under lockdown.

=== Political career ===
He began his political career as a parliamentary assistant to Jean-Luc Mélenchon before running office as a conseiller général of the sixth constituency (Canton of Massy-Est) of Essonne in 1998. He was President of the General council of Essonne between 2011 and 2014 and mayor of Massy. He lost his seat in the 2015 departmental elections, after which he became opposition councilor.

At the national level, he served as the substitute for François Lamy from 1997 to 2002 and entered the National Assembly while Lamy was serving in Jean-Marc Ayrault's government.

In 2017, Lamy ran for office in the Nord department—specifically in the constituency where he had previously served as the incumbent's substitute for twenty years—but failed to win the seat. He was subsequently elected as a regional councillor for Île-de-France in 2021.

Guedj lost his seat in the 2017 French legislative election but won back his seat in the 2022 French legislative election, defeating minister Amélie de Montchalin, as the NUPES candidate.

In 2023, Guedj publicly endorsed the re-election of the Socialist Party's chairman Olivier Faure.

==== Candidacy for President 2026/2027 ====
On 5 February 2026, Guedj announced his candidacy for the 2027 French presidential election. He made the announcement on the morning show of France Inter. He told the interviewer, Benjamin Duhamel, of his intention "to champion the voice of a Left that is republican, pro-European, universalist, secular, socially conscious, and environmentally minded." He admitted that he hopes to "shake up the political left" landscape.

Guedj also said that he does not intend to participate in the primary that the Socialist Party leader Olivier Faure wants to hold in October 2026. Guedj called the proposed primary "baroque."

He has broken from La France Insoumise (LFI) and its leader, Jean-Luc Mélenchon, who he accuses of anti-semitism, considering his response of the October 7 attacks on Israel lacking a clear condemnation of the terrorists, and he criticizes LFI members for not standing up against him more forcefully. Guedj seeks to unite people across party lines, but some like the Socialist president of the council of Seine-Saint-Denis Stéphane Troussel are concerned that one more candidate on the political left hurts the Left rather than uniting it. Within the Socialist Party, the other candidates in the 2027 presidential race are Ségolène Royal and Karim Bouamrane.
