= Hôtel de Ville, Chilly-Mazarin =

Town hall in Chilly-Mazarin, France

Hôtel de Ville
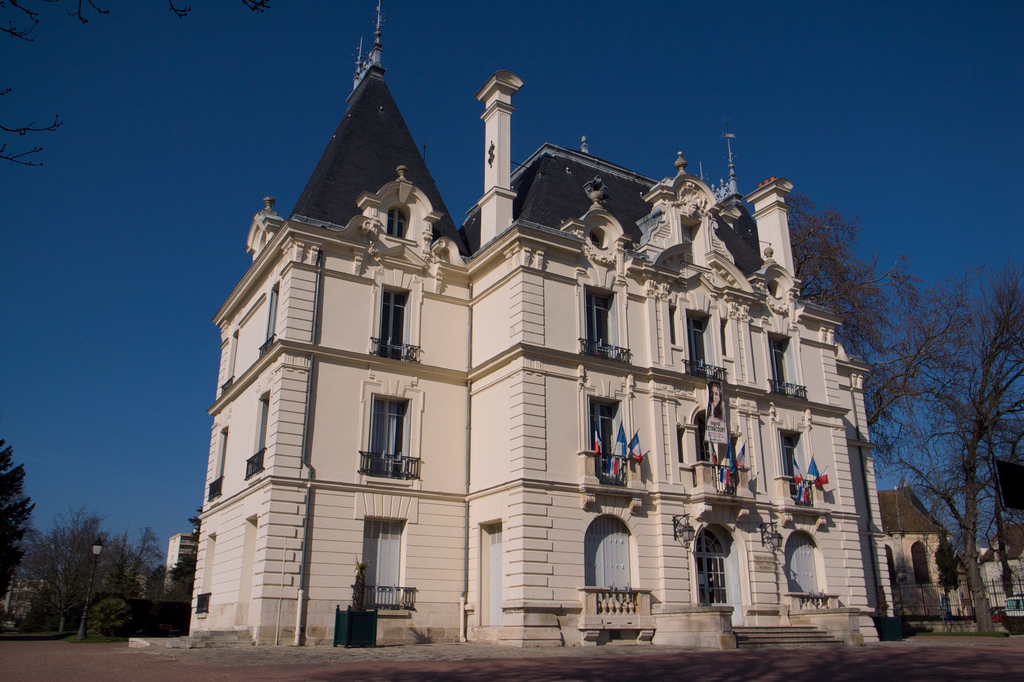
- The main frontage of the Hôtel de Ville in February 2008

General information
- Type: City hall
- Architectural style: Neoclassical style
- Location: Chilly-Mazarin, France
- Coordinates: 48.7025°N 2.3125°E
- Completed: 1825

The Hôtel de Ville (French pronunciation: [otɛl də vil], City Hall) is a municipal building in Chilly-Mazarin, Essonne, in the southern suburbs of Paris, standing on Place du 8 Mai 1945.

== History ==
After the French Revolution, the new town council of Mitry initially met in the house of the mayor at the time. This arrangement continued until 1856, when the council decided to commission a combined town hall and school. The site they selected was on the northwestern side of the Grande Rue (now Rue François Mouthon). The building was designed in the neoclassical style, built in brick with a cement render finish and was completed in 1860. The building used as an infirmary by Prussian troops during Franco-Prussian War in 1870, and significant repairs were subsequently required. After the building was no longer needed for municipal use, it was converted for use as a cinema which was known as the Cinéma François Truffaut, named after the film maker, François Truffaut.

In 1971, the council, led by the mayor, Claude Ehrhart, decided to acquire a more substantial municipal building. The building they selected was a fine 19th century villa which had been erected within the grounds off the former Château de Chilly. The château had been commissioned by Robert I of Dreux, who was the fifth son of Louis VI, in the 12th century. The Superintendent of Finances to Louis XIII, Antoine Coiffier de Ruzé, marquis d'Effiat, then had the building remodelled to a design by Clément II Métezeau between 1627 and 1632. It was later acquired by the Durfort family and then the d'Aumont family. In 1822, the château was bought by Louis Isidore Jardin who decided to demolish it and to erect the current villa on the site. The new villa was designed in the neoclassical style, built in ashlar stone and was completed in 1825.

The design involved a symmetrical main frontage of five bays facing southeast towards what is now Rue François Mouthon. The central section of three bays, which was projected forward, featured three round-headed openings with voussoirs and keystones on the ground floor, a round-headed window flanked by a pair of square-headed windows, all with moulded surrounds, keystones and balconies on the first floor, and three square-headed windows with moulded surrounds and keystones on the second floor. At attic level, there was a curved pediment, surmounted by an attic window with an ornate surround, flanked by a pair of oculi. The end bays contained doorways on the ground floor, were fenestrated by square-headed windows in a similar style on the upper floors, and were surmouted by pyramid-style roofs. By the early 1970s, the house was owned by a developer, François Mouthon, who donated the villa to the council in return for the right to build private houses elsewhere on the estate.

In April 2025, the council announced that the building needed urgent repairs, including restoration of the plasterwork, expected to cost around €1.5 million, and launched an appeal to raise the necessary funds.
