= Chilly-Mazarin =

Commune in Île-de-France, France

- Commune
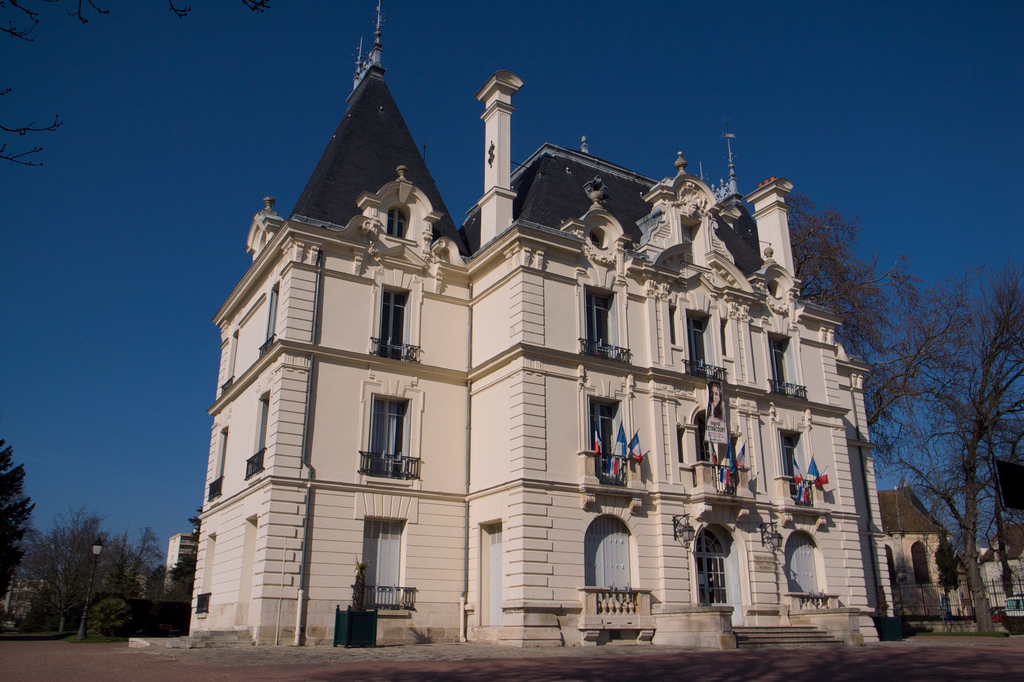
- The Hôtel de Ville

- Coat of arms

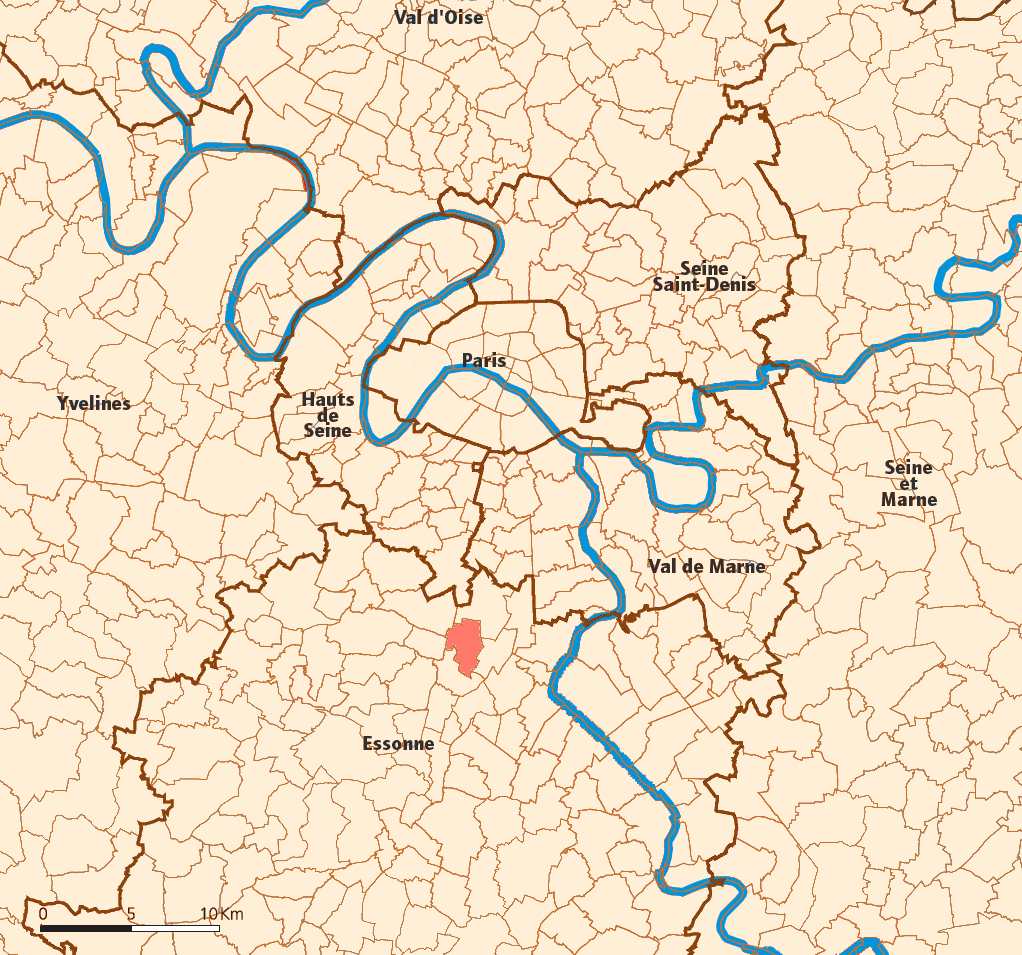
- Location (in red) within Paris inner and outer suburbs
- Location of Chilly-Mazarin
- Location within France Location within Île-de-France (region)
- Coordinates: 48°42′09″N 2°18′45″E
- Country: France
- Region: Île-de-France
- Department: Essonne
- Arrondissement: Palaiseau
- Canton: Massy
- Intercommunality: CA Paris-Saclay

Government
  - Mayor (2020–2026): Rafika Rezgui
- Area^{1}: 5.57 km^{2} (2.15 sq mi)
- Highest elevation: 101 m (331 ft)
- Lowest elevation: 42 m (138 ft)
- Population (2023): 20,443
  - Density: 3,670/km^{2} (9,510/sq mi)
- Time zone: UTC+01:00 (CET)
  - Summer (DST): UTC+02:00 (CEST)
- INSEE/Postal code: 91161 /91380
- ^{1} French Land Register data, which excludes lakes, ponds, glaciers > 1 km^{2} (0.386 sq mi or 247 acres) and river estuaries.

Chilly-Mazarin (French: [ʃiji mazaʁɛ̃]) is a commune in the southern suburbs of Paris, France. It is located 16.9 km (10.5 mi) from the center of Paris.

A small part of Orly International Airport lies on the territory of the commune of Chilly-Mazarin.

Inhabitants of Chilly-Mazarin are known as Chiroquois.

== Geography ==
Chilly-Mazarin lies in the northern part of the Essonne department, within the historic Hurepoix region. The commune covers an area of 5.57 km^{2} (2.15 sq mi) on the northern slope of the Yvette valley and the southern edge of the Orly plateau. Elevations range from 42 m (138 ft) at the southeastern end of the commune to 101 m (331 ft) in the northwest.

The commune is bordered by Massy to the northwest, Wissous to the north and northeast (with which it shares a portion of Orly Airport), Morangis to the east, Longjumeau to the south, and Champlan to the west. The Yvette flows along its southern edge for roughly one kilometre, joined just outside the commune by the partially underground Bief stream.

== History ==
Chilly-Mazarin developed around a Roman villa named Cailliacum which evolved into Chailly then Chilly. The suffix -Mazarin was added in 1822 to distinguish it from other French villages named Chilly and refers to the Mazarinettes, the famed nieces of Cardinal Mazarin who, for several years, lived at a mansion in Chilly. The fourth niece, Hortense Mancini, pass down to her son the titles of Marquess of Chilly and Duke of Mazarin which were ultimately passed to the House of Grimaldi, reigning house of Monaco.

=== Antiquity ===
Archaeological evidence attests to a long human presence in the area. At the "La Butte aux Bergers" site in the north of the commune, rescue excavations uncovered a Late Hallstatt / Early La Tène Iron Age storage pit (around the 5th century BC) containing an unusual deposit that combined a woman's skeleton with the remains of several animals, including horses, a wildcat and hares. During the Gallo-Roman period, in the 3rd century, springs in the territory were tapped to supply Lutetia with water through an underground aqueduct that ran north toward Roman Paris.

=== Middle Ages ===
The medieval village of Chailly, attested by the 12th century, possessed a church and a mill, and its inhabitants combined viticulture with cereal cultivation. The fief, called membre de Chilly, was originally held by the Knights Templar and passed to the Knights Hospitaller after the dissolution of the Templar order, becoming a dependency of the commandery of Balizy. The lordship subsequently passed through several noble houses to the Gaillard family in the late 15th century. Souveraine d'Angoulême, half-sister of Francis I and wife of Michel II Gaillard, lord of Chilly, is buried in the church of Saint-Étienne.

=== Marquisate of Chilly ===
In 1596 the seigneury was purchased by Martin Ruzé de Beaulieu, a royal minister, who bequeathed it to his great-nephew Antoine Coëffier de Ruzé d'Effiat.

In 1624, having returned successfully from negotiating the marriage of Henrietta Maria to Charles I of England, Coëffier de Ruzé secured the unification of the lands of Chilly, Longjumeau and Balizy into a single marquisate. He went on to become Marshal of France and Superintendent of Finances. He obtained from Louis XIII the right to draw water from the springs that had once supplied Lutetia, in order to feed the ornamental ponds of his château at Chilly. Two stone inspection structures (regards) along the underground aqueduct, one on rue d'Effiat and the other on avenue Charles-de-Gaulle, still stand in the town; their foundation stone was laid by Antoine Ruzé d'Effiat and his son on 30 March 1627.

=== From the 19th century to the present ===
The arrival of the railway in 1883, with the opening of the Grande Ceinture line, and the construction of the A6 motorway in 1956, transformed Chilly-Mazarin from a rural village of around 400 inhabitants at the start of the 20th century into a residential suburb of more than 16,000 by 1975. The commune was liberated on 24 August 1944 by the 2nd Armoured Division under General Leclerc. In 1971, the municipality acquired what remained of the former Château de Chilly estate and converted the villa that had replaced it in 1825 into the Hôtel de Ville.

Until 1968, Chilly-Mazarin was part of the Seine-et-Oise department; it was transferred to the new Essonne department under the 1964 reorganisation of the Paris region.

A second 17th-century manor in the commune, the Château de Bel Abord on avenue Mazarin, was demolished in 1963 to make way for a residential complex; its porte cochère and Louis XIII pavilion (the ceiling of which is attributed to Simon Vouet) survive and were listed as Monuments Historiques in 1984.

== Population ==
Historical population

Year	Pop.	±% p.a.
1793	449	—
1821	369	−0.70%
1846	332	−0.42%
1872	341	+0.10%
1901	422	+0.74%
1921	398	−0.29%
1926	1,023	+20.78%
1931	1,507	+8.06%
1936	1,681	+2.21%
1946	1,697	+0.09%
1954	2,188	+3.23%

Year	Pop.	±% p.a.
1962	3,411	+5.71%
1968	9,923	+19.48%
1975	16,236	+7.29%
1982	17,271	+0.89%
1990	16,939	−0.24%
1999	17,737	+0.51%
2007	18,577	+0.58%
2012	19,213	+0.68%
2017	20,181	+0.99%
2023	20,443	+0.22%

Source: EHESS and INSEE (1968-2023)

== Transport ==
Chilly-Mazarin is served by Chilly-Mazarin station, located on the southern branch of the Grande Ceinture line. Until December 2023, the station was served by Paris RER line C (branch C8). Since 9 December 2023, this service has been replaced by Tram T12, which links Massy-Palaiseau to Évry-Courcouronnes. Connections to central Paris are now made at Massy-Palaiseau (RER B and C) or Épinay-sur-Orge (RER C).

== Education ==
There are:

- Seven preschools (écoles maternelles): du Centre, du Château, Les Roseaux, Les Saules, Pasteur, and Pauline Kergomard
- Four elementary schools: du Château, Jean-de-la-Fontaine, Pasteur, and Pierre et Marie Curie

There is a junior high school, Collège les Dînes Chiens, which opened in 1968.

High schools in the area include:

- Lycée Marguerite-Yourcenar - Morangis
- Lycée Jacques-Prévert - Longjumeau
- Lycée des Métiers Jean-Perrin – Longjumeau

== See also ==
- Communes of the Essonne department
