= Patrick Bloche =

French politician

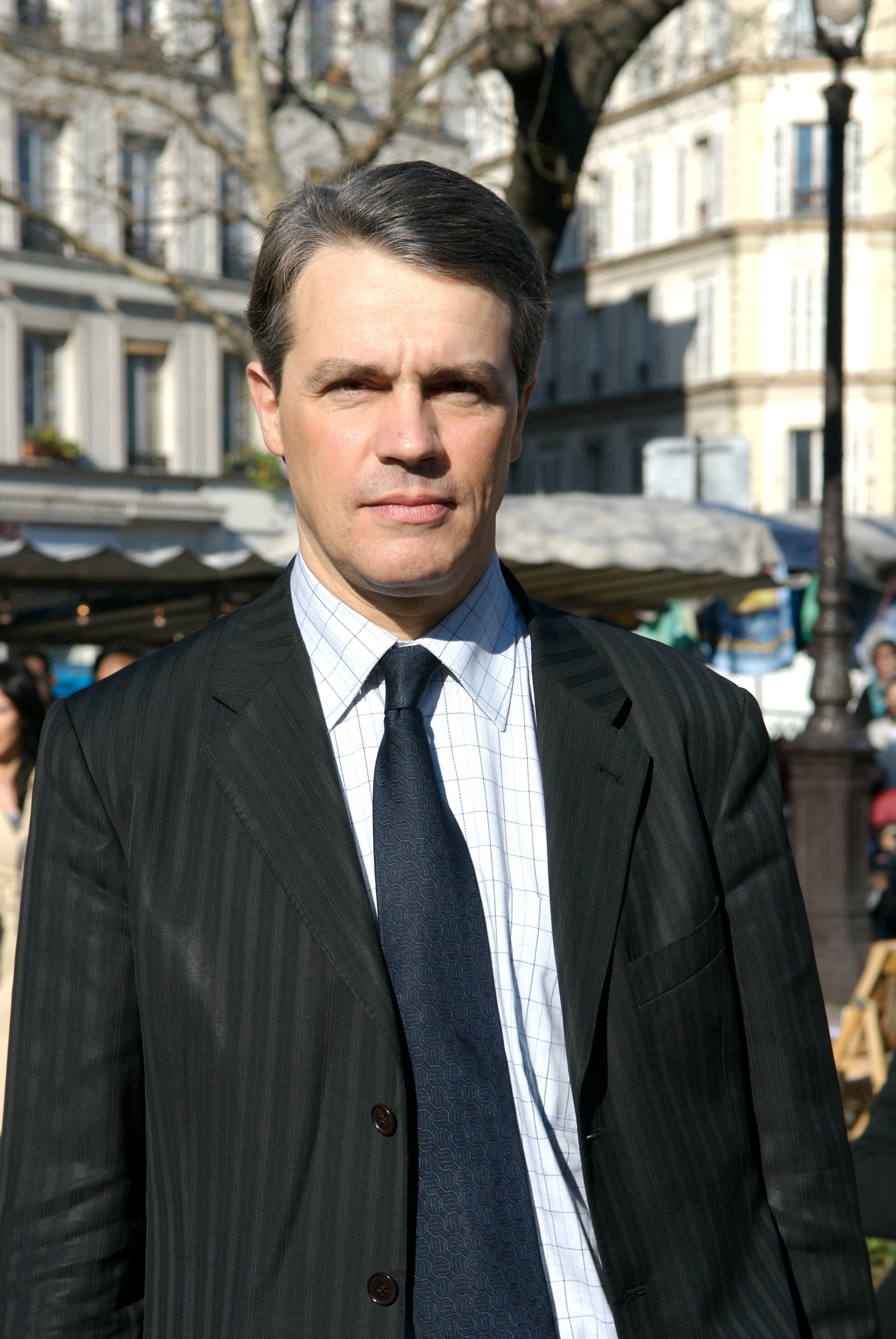
- Patrick Bloche in 2011

First Deputy Mayor of Paris
- In office 8 July 2024 – 29 March 2026
- Mayor: Anne Hidalgo
- Preceded by: Emmanuel Grégoire
- Succeeded by: Lamia El Aaraje

Member of the National Assembly for Paris's 7th constituency
- In office 12 June 1997 – 20 June 2017
- Preceded by: Alain Devaquet
- Succeeded by: Pacôme Rupin

Councillor of Paris
- In office 8 June 1995 – 29 March 2026
- Constituency: 11th arrondissement

Personal details
- Born: 4 July 1956 (age 70) Neuilly-sur-Seine, France
- Party: Socialist Party

Patrick Bloche (French pronunciation: [patʁik blɔʃ]; born 4 July 1956 in Neuilly-sur-Seine) is a French politician of the Socialist Party (PS) who served as a member of the National Assembly of France from 1997 to 2017. In parliament, he was part of the SRC parliamentary group.

== Political career ==
=== Career in local politics ===
Bloche has been a member of the Socialist Party since the age of 16 (1972), is a member of the General Council of Paris, and became a member of the Paris City Council in June 1995. In 2017, he became deputy mayor of Paris under Anne Hidalgo and became her first deputy mayor in 2024.

First, a close collaborator of Georges Sarre, Bloche is a long-standing member of CERES. But in 1991, he was one of the supporters of the commitment of France in the Gulf War, and for this reason he broke definitively with Jean-Pierre Chevenement and Georges Sarre.

In January 2000, Bloche was supported by Daniel Vaillant and Bertrand Delanoë (Chairman of the Socialist Group in the Council of Paris), and he was elected with over 61% of the votes of members to the post of first secretary of the Parti Socialiste Paris federation, where he succeeded Jean-Marie Le Guen, who resigned on 23 November 1999.

=== Member of the National Assembly, 1997–2017 ===
Bloche served as a member of parliament for the Socialist Party from 1997, the year of the dissolution of the National Assembly by Jacques Chirac, in the 7th district of Paris (XI e XII arrondissement). He was president of the Law Committee and Rapporteur of the proposed Act PACS, which he was co-authored with Jean-Pierre Michel.

Bloche led the Socialist list in 2008 French municipal elections, in the XIth district, and was elected Mayor of the Borough, on 29 March 2008. In 2009, he opposed the draft HADOPI law, and defended as an alternative the blanket license. In 2011, he opposed a "freedom of panorama" amendment, calling it an « amendement Wikipédia ».

On 13 July 2011 Bloche joined the campaign team of Martine Aubry for the PS primaries, which she lost to François Hollande. Within the campaign team, he was responsible, along with Sandrine Bonnaire, for culture and media.

In parliament, Bloche served as president of the Committee on Cultural Affairs and Education during the Hollande government. The committee voted in favour of an amendment proposed by Martine Faure, and favoured by Yves Durand, Martine Martinel and Marie-George Buffet among others, to replace, in the national elementary curriculum, the biological concept of "sex" with the concept of "gender" to include a social dimension. The elementary curriculum was successfully revised in September 2013 under the name "l'ABCD de l'egalite".

In addition to his committee assignments, Bloche served as vice chairman of the Study Group on the issue of Tibet.

Ahead of the Socialist Party's 2017 primaries, Bloche endorsed Vincent Peillon as the party's candidate for the presidential election later that year.
