= François Lamy (politician) =

French politician

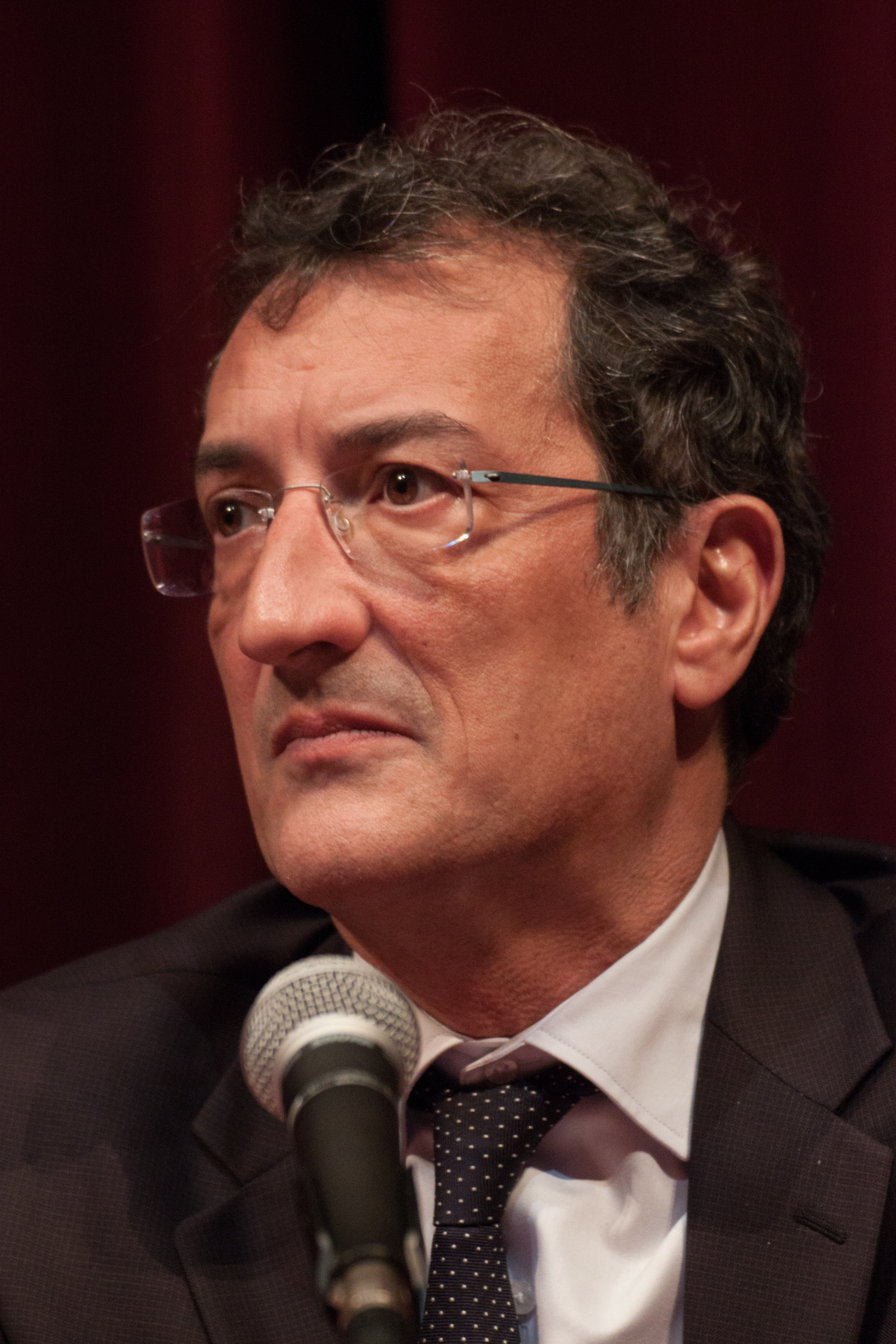
- Lamy attending a forum in Grenoble (2013)

Junior Minister for Urban Affairs at the Ministry of Territorial Equality and Housing
- In office 16 May 2012 – 31 March 2014
- President: François Hollande
- Prime Minister: Jean-Marc Ayrault
- Preceded by: Maurice Leroy
- Succeeded by: Najat Vallaud-Belkacem

Member of the National Assembly for Essonne's 6th constituency
- In office 2 May 2014 – 20 June 2017
- Preceded by: Jérôme Guedj
- Succeeded by: Amélie de Montchalin

Personal details
- Born: 31 October 1959 (age 66) Brunoy, France
- Party: Socialist Party
- Relatives: Alexandra Lamy (cousin); Audrey Lamy (cousin); Chloé Jouannet (first cousin once removed)
- Profession: Teacher

François Lamy (French pronunciation: [fʁɑ̃swa lami]; born 31 October 1959) is a French politician who, until his appointment as Junior Minister for Urban Affairs at the newly created Ministry of Territorial Equality and Housing by President François Hollande on 16 May 2012, was a member of the National Assembly of France where he represented the 6th constituency of Essonne on behalf of the Socialist Party.

He is a close adviser of Martine Aubry, and was her campaign manager in the primary election to choose the Socialist Party's candidate for the French presidential election of 2012.
