= Clara Chassaniol =

French politician (born 1993)

Member of the National Assembly for Paris's 7th constituency
- In office 23 July 2022 – 11 February 2024
- Preceded by: Clément Beaune
- Succeeded by: Clément Beaune

Councillor of Paris
- Incumbent
- Assumed office 22 March 2026

Personal details
- Born: 26 July 1993 (age 33) Châteauroux, France
- Party: Renaissance

Clara Chassaniol (French pronunciation: [klaʁa ʃasanjɔl]; born 26 July 1993) is a French politician who is a councillor of the 12th arrondissement of Paris, and of Paris from 2026. She previously represented Paris's 7th constituency in the National Assembly from 2022 to 2024. A member of Renaissance (RE), she was Clément Beaune's substitute in the 2022 legislative election. In Parliament, she sat on the Committee on Laws. Her term ended on 11 February 2024, following the resignation of Élisabeth Borne's government and the investiture of Prime Minister Gabriel Attal's government. Clément Beaune was not reappointed to the new government and returned to his seat as a member of parliament.
