= Yorane Julians =

French basketball player (born 1981)

Yorane Julians (born 22 May 1981 in Massy, Essonne) is a French basketball player who played 34 games for French Pro A league club Châlons en Champagne during the 2004-2005 season.
