= Caroline Mécary =

French politician

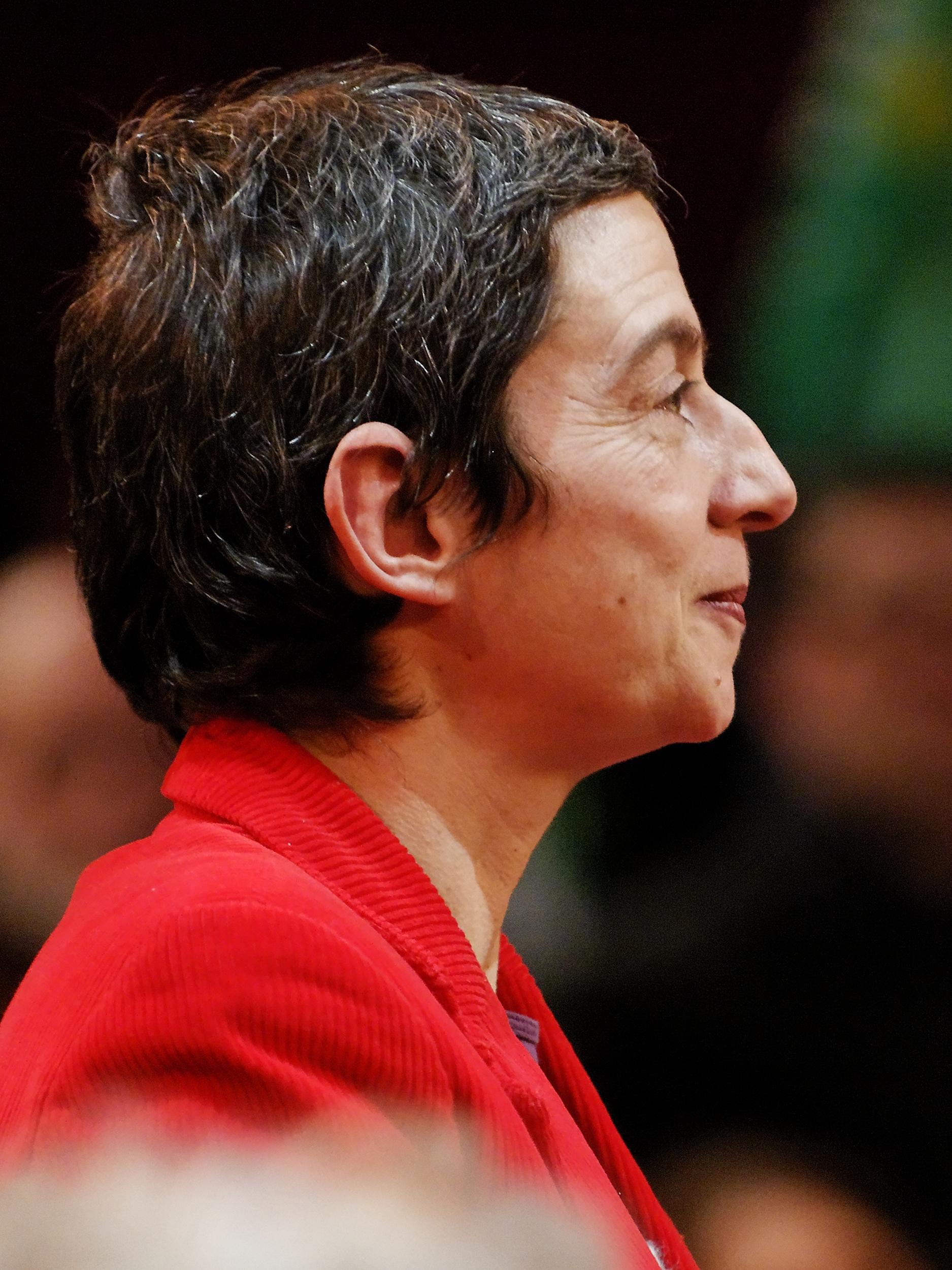
- Caroline Mécary in 2010

Councillor of Paris
- In office 30 March 2014 – 28 July 2020
- Mayor: Anne Hidalgo

Personal details
- Born: 16 April 1963 (age 63) Paris, France
- Party: France Unbowed - La France Insoumise
- Education: Paris Nanterre University
- Occupation: Lawyer

Caroline Mécary (born 16 April 1963) is a French lawyer as well as a politician of the France Unbowed (also known as La France Insoumise or LFI) in France. She is also an active member of the Regional council of Île-de-France. A staunch supporter of LGBT rights and gay marriage, Caroline Mécary is also the co-founder of the Copernic Foundation.

She is the NUPES candidate in Paris's 7th constituency in the 2022 French legislative election.

== Biography ==
Born in Paris on 16 April 1963 to Christiane Roux, a painter from a cultured family of Saint-Étienne and Boulos El Mekari, a Maronite Christian who worked as the executive director of a computer company. She acquired his French nationality in 1968. Her father died when she was 13 years old.

== Professional career ==
Having completed law school in Nanterre, Caroline Mécary took up a job at Télédiffusion de France for one year (1988–1989). She then went on to take the bar in Paris, becoming a barrister in 1991. While she specialized in copyrights for writers and artists, she also taught media law at Sorbonne University of Paris I and Paris XII during 1994-1997. In 1993, she established her own law firm. She is a member of the French union of lawyers and was also a member of the Council of the Bar association of Paris from 2005 until 2007.

Since 1993, she has been a member of GISTI (groupe d'information et de soutien des immigrés), an association which defends the human rights of immigrants.

== Gay marriage ==
Caroline Mécary has been in favour of marriage of same-sex couples since 1998. In 2004, Noël Mamère, the mayor of Bègles in the suburbs of Bordeaux, disobeyed French law and conducted the first gay marriage as an act of defiance. The Mayor and the gay couple were subsequently sued; Caroline Mécary defended them. The marriage was annulled despite their efforts but they managed to successfully raise the question of gay marriage. In 2010, along with SOS Homophobie and APGL (Association des parents et futurs parents gays et lesbiens) she represented a lesbian couple before the French constitutional court (which decides if any law is constitutional and in conformity with French law). The couple wished to get married, but under French law they had no legal right to marriage. Their appeal was rejected on 28 January 2011, and the court pointed out that only the French Assembly could rewrite or change the law.

== Overseas adoption and recognition of adoption on French territory ==
In July 2010, a bi-national lesbian couple (French-American) was represented by Caroline Mécary because their child had been conceived through artificial insemination in the U.S., and under American law, the French partner had adopted the child. However, the French partner was not recognized as the legal parent under French law. After a long legal battle, she won the test case for all gay parents who have children overseas. In February 2011 she won a similar case; this time of a gay couple who had adopted their children under British and Canadian law. However, since they were not married it challenged a 1966 law which allowed joint legal adoption only by married couples

== Political commitments ==
In 2008, Caroline Mécary was elected as the president of the Copernic Foundation, a left-wing think tank. Since 2011 she has co-chaired the Foundation with Pierre Khalfa. In March 2010, she stood for election and was elected to the regional council of the greater Paris area. She is a permanent member of the council and in charge of the commissions on Environment, Agriculture and Energy, youth, Metropolitan policy and security. As an elected member of the Greater Paris area, she is also a member of the association which manages regional funds for contemporary and modern art. In 2012, she endorsed Anne Hidalgo's candidacy for Mayor of Paris.

== Books ==
- Caroline Mécary, L’amour et la loi : Homos/hétéros : mêmes droits mêmes devoirs, Paris, Alma, 2012 (ISBN 978-2-36-279060-7)
- Laurence Gratiot, Caroline Mécary, Stephen Bensimon, Guy Haarscher et Benoît Frydman, Art et techniques de la plaidoirie,
- Paris, Lexis Nexis, coll. « Droit & Professionnels », 2011, 6e éd. (1re éd. 1995) (ISBN 978-2711012251)
- Caroline Mécary, Le Pacs 2010, Paris, Delmas, coll. « Delmas express », 2009, 3e éd. (1re éd. 2006) (ISBN 978-2247085613)
- Caroline Mécary, L’Adoption, Paris, PUF, coll. « Que sais-je ? », 2006 (ISBN 978-2130546870)
- Caroline Mécary et Géraud de La Pradelle, Les Droits des homosexuel/les, Paris, PUF, coll. « Que sais-je ? », 2003, 3e éd. (1re éd. 1998) (ISBN 978-2130531456)
- Flora Leroy-Forgeot et Caroline Mécary, Le Couple homosexuel et le Droit, Paris, Odile Jacob, coll. « Histoire et document », 2001 (ISBN 978-2738109996)
- Caroline Mécary et Flora Leroy-Forgeot, Le PACS, Paris, PUF, coll. « Que sais-je ? », 2001, 2e éd. (1re éd. 2000) (ISBN 978-2130519591)
- Caroline Mécary, Droit et Homosexualité, Paris, Dalloz, coll. « États de droit », 2000 (ISBN 978-2247039227)
