= Hôtel de Ville, Massy =

Town hall in Massy, France

Hôtel de Ville
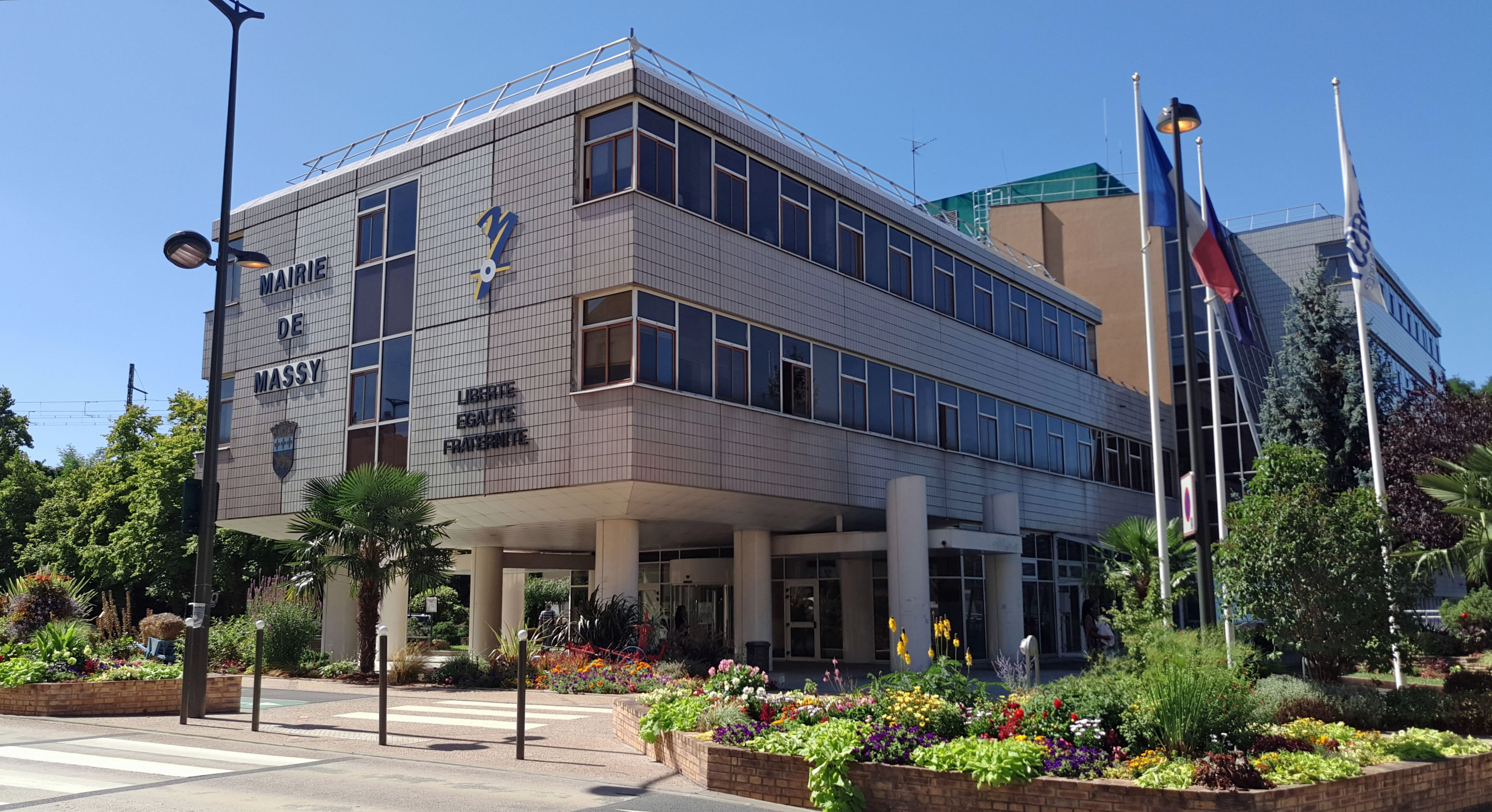
- The main frontage of the Hôtel de Ville in August 2016
- Interactive map of the Hôtel de Ville area

General information
- Type: City hall
- Architectural style: Modern style
- Location: Massy, France
- Coordinates: 48.7310°N 2.2713°E
- Completed: 1987

The Hôtel de Ville (French pronunciation: [otɛl də vil], City Hall) is a municipal building in Massy, Essonne, in the southwestern suburbs of Paris, standing on Avenue du Général de Gaulle.

== History ==
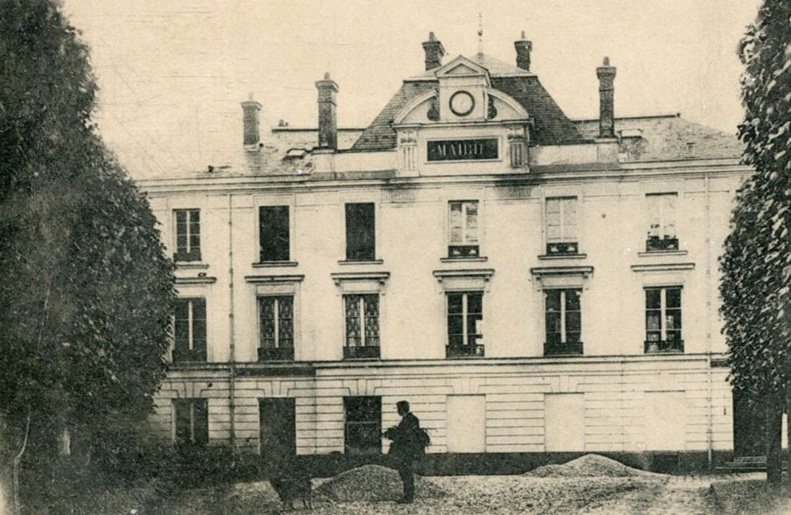
The old town hall, completed in 1882

After the French Revolution, the newly elected town council looked for a building in which to hold their meetings. The building they selected, on the corner of Rue Gabriel Péri and Rue de la Mallamande (now Rue Gambetta), was a small two-storey structure, which jutted out into Rue de la Mallamande and served as the home of the council from 1 September 1792. The design involved an asymmetrical main frontage of two bays facing onto Rue Gabriel Péri. There was a shop front and a doorway on the ground floor, and two small windows on the first floor.

In the late 1870s, the town council decided to commission a municipal building which would serve as a town hall and a school. The site they selected had been occupied by the home of a local tile merchant, Pierre Aragon, who died in April 1793 during the Reign of Terror. The new building was designed by Charles Bonnaire in the neoclassical style, built in brick with a stucco finish and was completed in 1882. The design involved a symmetrical main frontage of seven bays facing onto what is now Avenue du Général de Gaulle. There were a series of square headed openings on the ground floor, three of which were blocked up. The first floor was fenestrated by casement windows with cornices, while the second floor was fenestrated by plain casement windows. At roof level, across the central three bays, there was a parapet, which was broken by a panel inscribed with the word "Mairie". The panel was flanked by pilasters supporting a segmental pediment containing a clock. Behind the parapet, there was a mansard roof.

Following significant population growth, partly due to immigration from north Africa in the post-war era, the town council decided to demolish the old town hall and to commission a modern municipal complex on the same site. Although, the original design concept also involved commercial and residential buildings, a community hall and a hotel, these projects were never undertaken. Campaigners against demolition of the old building organised marches under the banner "Que Marianne était jolie dans l'ancienne Mairie" ("How pretty Marianne was in the old Town Hall"). Nevertheless, the building was eventually demolished in 1985.

The new municipal building was designed in the modern style, built in concrete and glass and was completed in around 1986. It was laid out in three wings organised around a central elevator shaft. The ground floor was partially open, with a series of columns supporting the upper structure, which was faced with alternating bands of windows and of white concrete tiles. Internally, the principal room was the Salles des Mariages (wedding room), which was also intended to serve as a council chamber. It was refurbished, along with the entrance hall, in 2018. Plaques commemorating the lives of local people who had died in the two world wars were attached to the wall in the open area below the south wing of the building.

== Sources ==
- Bailliart, Paul (1961). Histoire de Massy. Librairie Bocquier.
