= Grégoire de Lasteyrie =

French politician (born 1984)

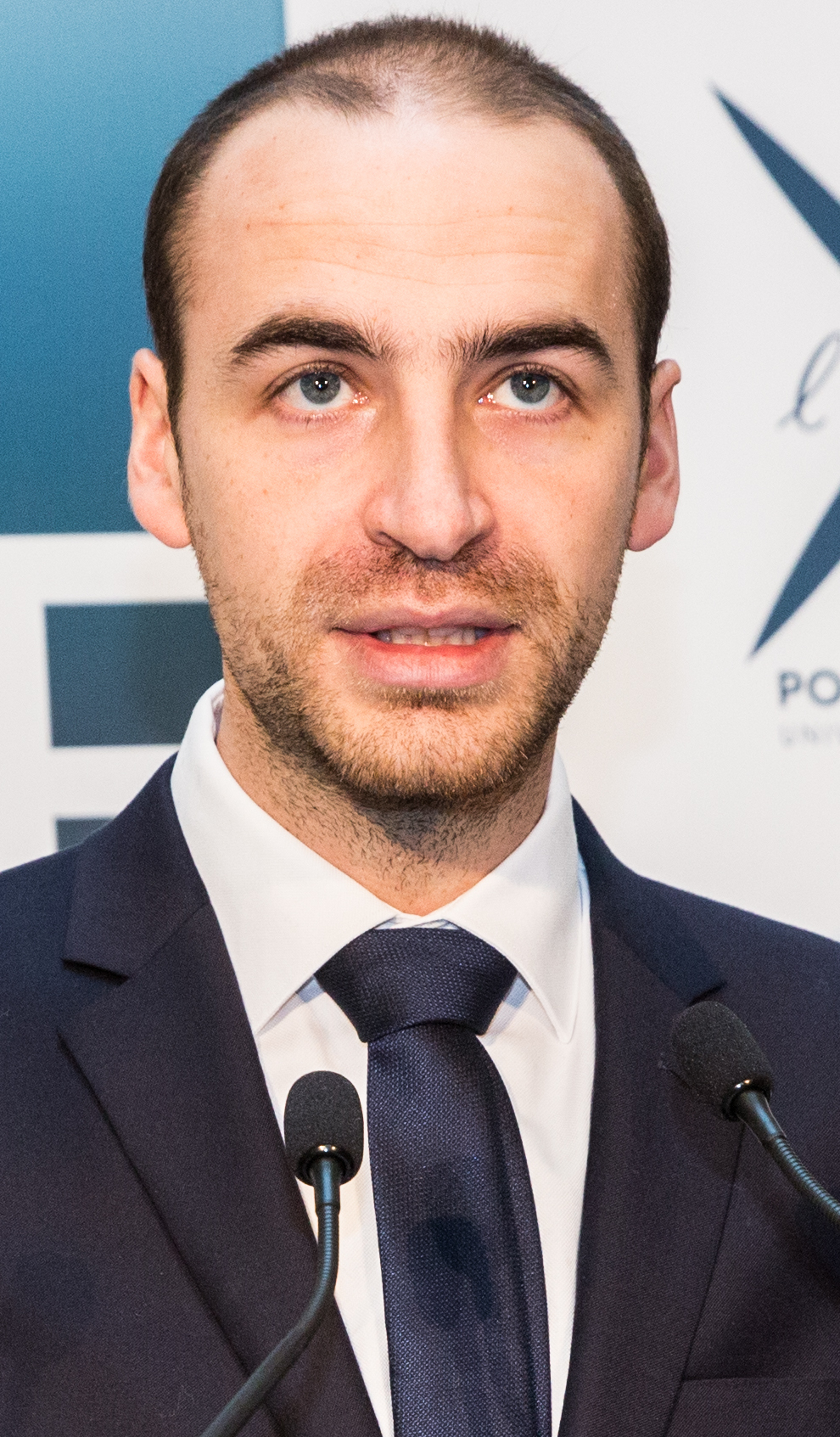
- Lasteyrie in 2018

Mayor of Palaiseau
- Incumbent
- Assumed office 3 April 2014
- Preceded by: Claire Robillard

Personal details
- Born: 14 August 1984 (age 41)
- Party: Horizons (since 2022)
- Other political affiliations: The Republicans (until 2022)
- Relatives: Charles de Lasteyrie (great-grandfather)

Grégoire de Lasteyrie (born 14 August 1984) is a French politician. He has served as mayor of Palaiseau since 2014, and as president of Paris-Saclay since 2020. He has been a member of the Regional Council of Île-de-France since 2015, and has served as its vice president for transport since 2024. He has served as vice president of Île-de-France Mobilités since 2021. In the 2012 legislative election, he was a candidate for the National Assembly in Essonne's 6th constituency. He has been a member of Horizons since 2022, and was a member of The Republicans until 2022.
