= Amélie de Montchalin =

French politician (born 1985)

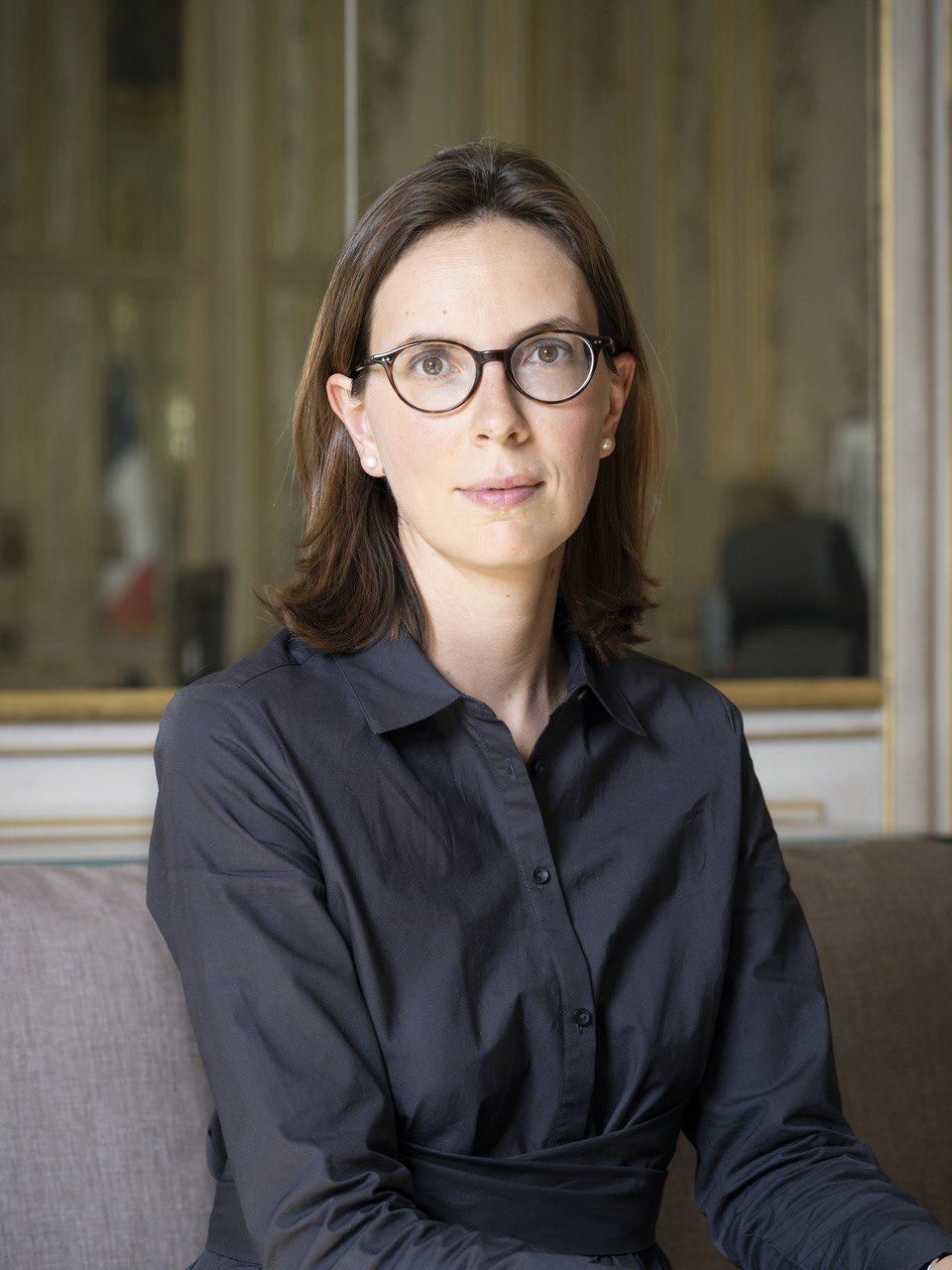
- Portrait, 2020

First President of the Court of Audit
- Incumbent
- Assumed office 23 February 2026
- President: Emmanuel Macron
- Preceded by: Pierre Moscovici

Minister of Public Action and Accounts
- In office 23 December 2024 – 22 February 2026
- Prime Minister: François Bayrou; Sébastien Lecornu
- Preceded by: Laurent Saint-Martin
- Succeeded by: David Amiel

Minister of Ecological Transition and Territorial Cohesion
- In office 22 May 2022 – 4 July 2022
- Prime Minister: Élisabeth Borne
- Preceded by: Barbara Pompili
- Succeeded by: Christophe Béchu

Minister of Public Transformation and Service
- In office 6 July 2020 – 20 May 2022
- Prime Minister: Jean Castex
- Preceded by: Annick Girardin (2017)
- Succeeded by: Stanislas Guerini

Secretary of State for European Affairs
- In office 27 March 2019 – 6 July 2020
- Prime Minister: Édouard Philippe
- Preceded by: Nathalie Loiseau
- Succeeded by: Clément Beaune

Member of the National Assembly for Essonne's 6th constituency
- In office 21 June 2017 – 30 April 2019
- Preceded by: François Lamy
- Succeeded by: Stéphanie Atger

Personal details
- Born: Amélie Chloé Bommier; 19 June 1985 (age 41) Lyon, France
- Party: Renaissance
- Spouse: Guillaume de Montchalin
- Relations: Véronique de Montchalin (aunt-in-law)
- Children: 3
- Education: Lycée Hoche; Lycée Sainte-Geneviève
- Alma mater: HEC Paris; Sorbonne University; Paris Dauphine University; Harvard University
- Profession: Economist

Amélie Chloé de Montchalin (French pronunciation: [ameli d(ə) mɔ̃ʃalɛ̃]; née Bommier, 19 June 1985) is a French politician who was appointed Minister for Public Accounts in the government of Prime Minister François Bayrou in 2024 and retained the office under Sébastien Lecornu in 2025 as Minister of Public Action and Accounts.

From 2022 to 2024, she was the Ambassador and Permanent Representative of France to the Organisation for Economic Co-operation and Development (OECD).

Montchalin previously served as Minister for Ecological Transition and Territorial Cohesion under Prime Minister Élisabeth Borne (2022), Minister of Public Transformation and Service under Prime Minister Jean Castex (2020–2022) and Secretary of State for European Affairs at the Ministry of Europe and Foreign Affairs (2019–2020).

A member of Renaissance (RE, formerly La République En Marche!), she was a member of the National Assembly from 2017 to 2019, representing the 6th constituency of Essonne. From 2017 to 2018, she was the La République En Marche! whip in the National Assembly's Finance Committee. In early 2026, she was chosen by Emmanuel Macron to become the next president of the Cour des comptes. The decision sparked criticism from the opposition as she was until then part of the government.

== Early life and education ==
Amélie de Montchalin was born in Lyon. Her father is an administrative executive and her mother is a nurse. She entered HEC Paris in 2005, graduating with a master's degree in management in 2009. During her studies, she interned for Valérie Pécresse in the National Assembly.

She took part in Nicolas Sarkozy's 2007 presidential campaign, and was a staffer for Pécresse during her time as Higher Education and Research Minister. Ahead of the 2016 The Republicans presidential primary, she helped craft Alain Juppé's economic platform.

== Career in the private sector ==
From 2009 to 2012, Montchalin worked as an economist in charge of Eurozone analysis for Exane BNP Paribas. She then studied at the Kennedy School of Government at Harvard University, graduating with a Master of Public Administration in 2014. From September 2014 she worked at the insurance firm AXA on issues related to global public policy, data protection and climate change.

== Political career ==
Before joining En Marche, Montchalin identified as on the political centre-right. She has spoken of becoming disenchanted with François Fillon of The Republicans and of being inspired by Emmanuel Macron's reformist and pro-European stance, and also by what she perceives as his willingness to prioritise skills over political experience.

In the 2017 legislative election she was elected with 61.34% of the vote in Essonne's 6th constituency, defeating her opponent Françoise Couasse of the Union of Democrats and Independents. Turnout was low at 41.35%. In the National Assembly, Amélie de Montchalin was a member of the Finance Committee, the parliamentary body that scrutinises public spending.

In 2021 she was elected to the Regional Council of Île-de-France in Essonne.

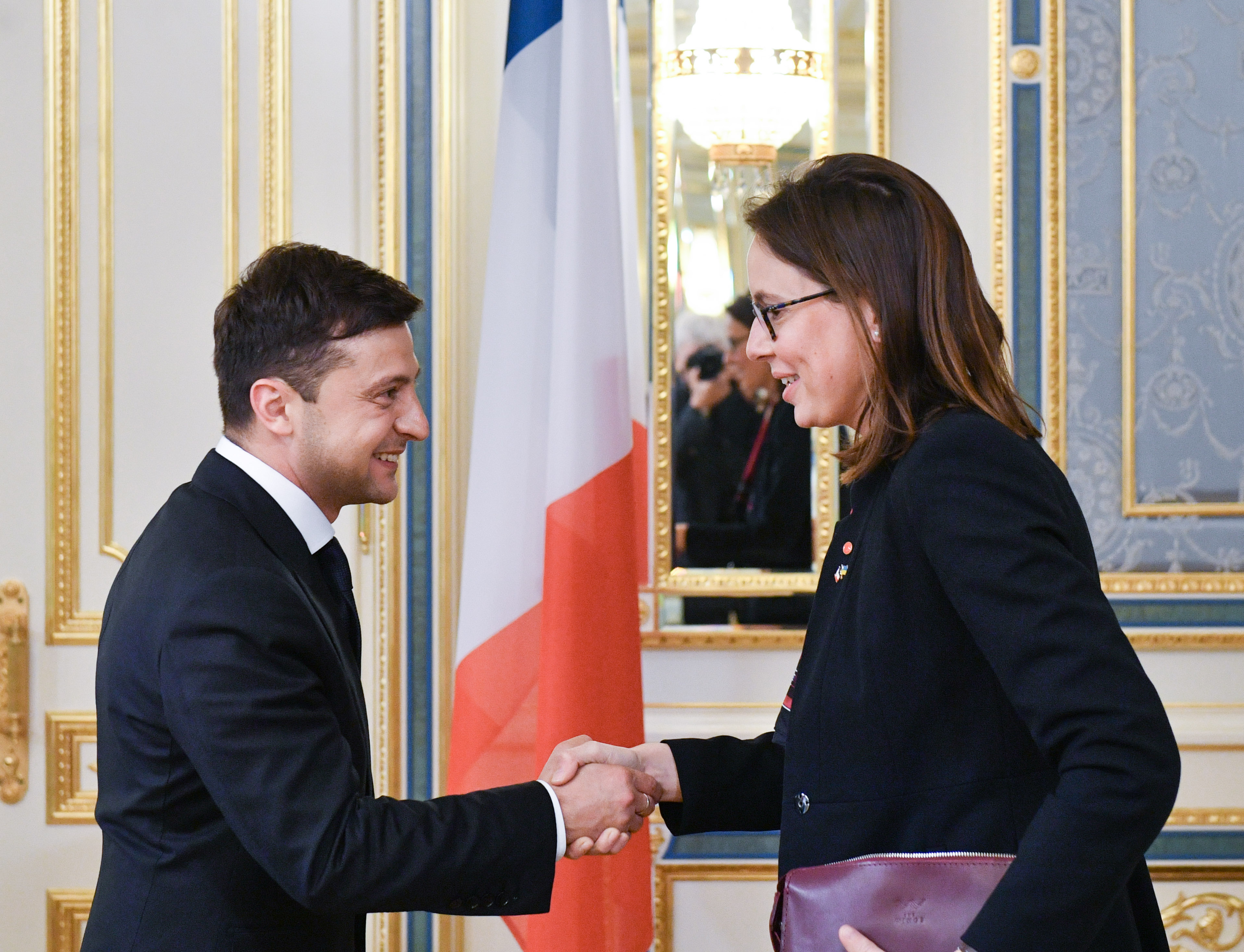
Amélie de Montchalin at the 2019 presidential inauguration of Volodymyr Zelenskyy

On 27 March 2019, she was appointed as Secretary of State for European Affairs, succeeding Nathalie Loiseau. She served in this post until July 2020, when she was promoted to become Minister of Public Transformation and Service in the Castex government. She became Minister of Ecological Transition and Territorial Cohesion in the Borne government but resigned in July 2022 just over a month in this position after her defeat against Socialist Jérôme Guedj at the 2022 legislative election.

Later in 2022, she succeeded Muriel Pénicaud as the French Ambassador and Permanent Representative to the OECD in Paris. She returned to the government at the end of 2024 as Minister for Public Accounts. Following the fall of the Bayrou government, she kept her office in the brief first Lecornu government as Minister of Public Accounts, before her title was changed to Minister of Public Action and Accounts in the second Lecornu government.

== Other activities ==
- European Council on Foreign Relations (ECFR), Member of the Council (since 2023)

== See also ==
- 2017 French legislative election
- Second Philippe government
- First Lecornu government
- Second Lecornu government
