= Paris's 7th constituency =

Constituency of the National Assembly of France

7th constituency of Paris
- inline Constituency of the National Assembly of France

- Paris, showing its post 2012 legislative constituencies
- Deputy: Dorine Bregman; Socialist
- Department: Paris

The 7th constituency of Paris (French: Septième circonscription de Paris) is a French legislative constituency in the department of Paris. Like the other 576 French constituencies, it elects one member of the National Assembly using the two-round system. Its boundaries were heavily redrawn in 1988 and 2012. In the 2017 legislative election, Pacôme Rupin of La République En Marche! (LREM) defeated four-term incumbent Patrick Bloche of the Socialist Party (PS).

7th constituency of Paris
- inline Constituency of the National Assembly of France

- Paris, showing its legislative constituencies between 1988 and 2012
- Member: constituency abolished, 2012
- Department: Paris

Map of Paris constituencies in 1981.

== Deputies ==
Election	Member	Party
1958	René Moatti	UNR
1961	Gabriel Kaspereit	UNR
1962	Gabriel Kaspereit	UNR
1967	Gabriel Kaspereit	UDR
1968	Gabriel Kaspereit	UDR
1969	Raymond Colibeau	UDR
1973	Gabriel Kaspereit	UDR
1978	Gabriel Kaspereit	RPR
1981	Gabriel Kaspereit	RPR
1986	Proportional representation - no election by constituency	
1988	Alain Devaquet	RPR
1993	Alain Devaquet	RPR
1997	Patrick Bloche	PS
2002	Patrick Bloche	PS
2007	Patrick Bloche	PS
2012	Patrick Bloche	PS
2017	Pacôme Rupin	LREM
2022	Clément Beaune	RE
2022	Clara Chassaniol	RE
2024	Clément Beaune	RE
2024	Emmanuel Grégoire	PS
2026	Dorine Bregman	PS

== Election results ==
=== 2024 ===
Candidate	Party	Alliance	First round			Second round		
Candidate	Party	Alliance	Votes	%	+/–	Votes	%	+/–
Emmanuel Grégoire	PS	NFP	30,974	50.87	+9.47			
Clément Beaune	RE	ENS	19,958	32.77	-3.04			
Céline Tacher	RN		4,815	7.91	+4.70			
Aurélien Véron	LR		3,010	4.94	-0.12			
Jason Reyes	REC		655	1.08	-2.72			
Philippe Mazuel	DIV		596	0.98	-1.12			
Sophie Lacaze	DVE		532	0.87	N/A			
Aurélia Petit	LO		289	0.47	-0.18			
Anne Grau	Volt		65	0.11	N/A			
Stéphanie Blanc	EXG		0	0.00	N/A			
Valid votes			60,894	99.01	+0.32			
Blank votes			424	0.69	-0.27			
Null votes			182	0.30	-0.05			
Turnout			61,500	76.53	+17.46			
Abstentions			18,864	23.47	-17.46			
Registered voters			80,364					
Source: Ministry of the Interior, Le Monde
Result						PS GAIN FROM LFI		

=== 2022 ===
Legislative Election 2022: Paris's 7th constituency
Party	Candidate	Votes	%	±%
LFI (NUPÉS)	Caroline Mécary	19,373	41.40	+5.17
LREM (Ensemble)	Clément Beaune	16,755	35.81	-7.17
LR (UDC)	Aurélien Véron	2,370	5.06	−4.78
REC	Constance Deletang	1,777	3.80	N/A
RN	Anne Hélène Janine Marie Daguenel (Nguyen Cong Duc)	1,503	3.21	+0.74
PRG	Rodrigue Flahaut-Prevot	1,114	2.38	N/A
DVG	Philippe Mazuel	982	2.10	N/A
Others	N/A	2,920		
Turnout		47,412	59.07	−0.81
2nd round result
LREM (Ensemble)	Clément Beaune	22,916	50.73	-5.17
LFI (NUPÉS)	Caroline Mécary	22,258	49.27	+5.17
Turnout		45,174	58.32	+8.71
LREM hold				

=== 2017 ===
2017 legislative election: Paris's 7th constituency
Party	Candidate	Votes	%	±%
LREM	Pacôme Rupin	19,381	42.98	N/A
PS	Patrick Bloche	7,202	15.97	−30.66
LFI	Jean-Charles Lallemand	5,280	11.71	N/A
LR	Vincent Roger	4,436	9.84	−13.92
EELV	Corine Faugeron	2,946	6.53	−0.83
FN	Isabelle Cochard	1,113	2.47	−2.11
DVD	Sandra Fellous	1,096	2.43	N/A
PCF	Nicolas Bonnet-Oulaldj	913	2.02	−5.45
Others	N/A	2,731		
Turnout		45,541	59.88	−1.39
2nd round result
LREM	Pacôme Rupin	19,637	55.90	N/A
PS	Patrick Bloche	15,491	44.10	−23.46
Turnout		37,729	49.61	−8.35
LREM gain from PS		Swing		

=== 2012 ===
2012 legislative election: Paris's 7th constituency
Candidate	Party	First round		Second round	
Candidate	Party	Votes	%	Votes	%
Patrick Bloche	PS	20,553	46.63%	27,724	67.56%
Claude-Annick Tissot	UMP	10,474	23.76%	13,305	32.42%
Catherine Vieu-Charier	FG	3,294	7.47%		
Corine Faugeron	EELV	3,242	7.36%		
Tiphaine Leost	FN	2,019	4.58%		
Jacky Majda	MoDem	1,159	2.63%		
Anne Lebreton	PR	641	1.45%		
Stéphanie Geisler	PP	415	0.94%		
Ivan Mouton	Cap21	298	0.68%		
Bruno Moschetto	MRC	283	0.64%		
Christiane Spilman	DLR	251	0.57%		
Elisabeth Castel	NC	229	0.52%		
Isabelle Laeng Cindy'Lee	Parti du plaisir	224	0.51%		
Eliane Guilleminot	AEI	213	0.48%		
Stéphane Rey	NPA	168	0.38%		
Isabelle Voitier	PCD	144	0.33%		
Anne Teurtroy	GA2012	139	0.32%		
Louis Raynaud	PVB	131	0.30%		
Philippe Marsault	LO	111	0.25%		
Christiane Chavane	DVD (PDL)	70	0.16%		
Mark Mosio	CPOC	16	0.04%		
Valid votes		44,074	99.27%	41,039	97.73%
Spoilt and null votes		322	0.73%	962	2.29%
Votes cast / turnout		44,396	61.27%	41,991	57.96%
Abstentions		28,068	38.73%	30,460	42.04%
Registered voters		72,464	100.00%	72,451	100.00%

=== 2007 ===
Elections between 1988 and 2007 were based on the 1988 boundaries.

Map of Paris Constituencies, 1988-2007 elections

2007 legislative election: Paris's 7th constituency
Party	Candidate	Votes	%	±%
PS	Patrick Bloche	15,344	37.88	
UMP	Claude-Annick Tissot	12,778	31.54	
MoDem	Grégory Perrin	5,100	12.59	
LV	Khédidja Bourcart	2,268	5.60	
PCF	Jacques Daguenet	1,632	4.03	
Far left	Danièle Moatti-Gornet	1,276	3.15	
FN	Christiane Pacros	902	2.23	
Others	N/A	1,209		
Turnout		40,833	64.00	
2nd round result
PS	Patrick Bloche	23,639	62.44	
UMP	Claude-Annick Tissot	14,220	37.56	
Turnout		38,659	60.60	
PS hold				

=== 2002 ===
2002 legislative election: Paris's 7th constituency
Party	Candidate	Votes	%	±%
PS	Patrick Bloche	15,509	39.70	
UMP	Nicole Guedj	12,109	31.00	
LV	Pénélope Komites	2,293	5.87	
FN	Christiane Pacros	2,290	5.86	
UDF	Ketty Dalmas-Prevost	1,733	4.44	
LCR	Cécile Silhouette	1,094	2.80	
PCF	Jean-Robert Franco	931	2.38	
Others	N/A	3,106		
Turnout		39,481	70.87	
2nd round result
PS	Patrick Bloche	20,811	57.74	
UMP	Nicole Guedj	15,231	42.26	
Turnout		36,899	66.25	
PS hold				

=== 1997 ===
1997 legislative election: Paris's 7th constituency
Party	Candidate	Votes	%	±%
PS	Patrick Bloche	10,909	32.03	
DVD	Corinne Lepage	10,288	30.20	
FN	Alain-Christian Fragny	3,510	10.30	
PCF	Jean-Robert Franco	2,486	7.30	
LV	Christian Colas	1,311	3.85	
LO	Annick Marsault	1,144	3.36	
Far left	Cécile Silhouette	1,133	3.33	
DVD	Thierry Magne	708	2.08	
Others	N/A	2,574		
Turnout		35,076	61.48	
2nd round result
PS	Patrick Bloche	20,001	54.50	
DVD	Corinne Lepage	16,698	45.50	
Turnout		38,078	66.74	
PS hold				
