= François Durovray =

French politician (born 1971)

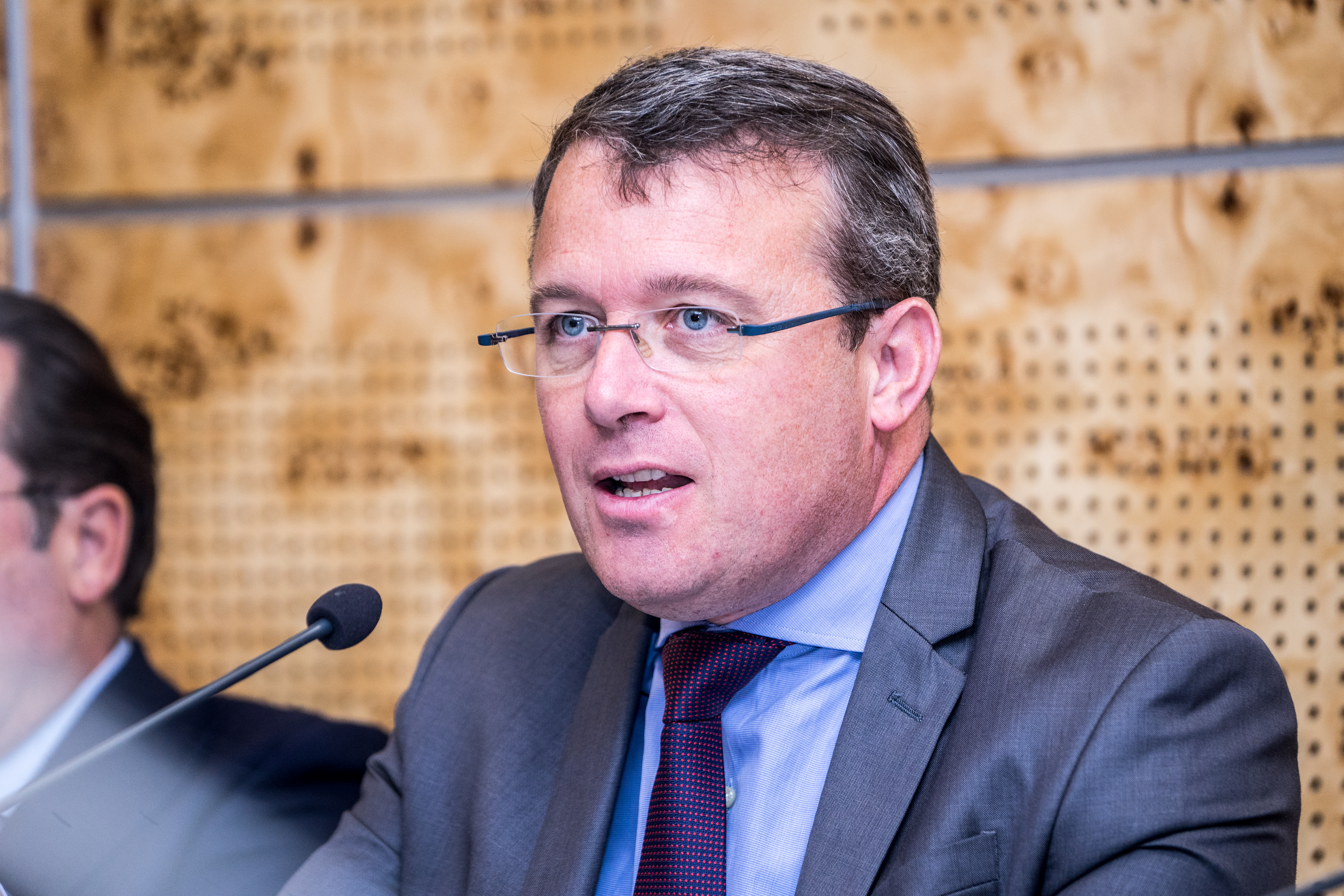
- Durovray in 2018

President of the Departmental Council of Essonne
- Incumbent
- Assumed office 2 April 2015
- Preceded by: Jérôme Guedj

Minister of Transport
- In office 21 September 2024 – 23 December 2024
- Prime Minister: Michel Barnier
- Preceded by: Patrice Vergriete
- Succeeded by: Philippe Tabarot

Personal details
- Born: 4 March 1971 (age 55) Paris, France
- Party: The Republicans (since 2015); Nous France (since 2021)
- Other political affiliations: Rally for the Republic (1986–2002); Union for a Popular Movement (2002–2015); Soyons libres (2017–2021)
- Education: Paris 1 Panthéon-Sorbonne University

François Durovray (born 4 March 1971) is a French politician of The Republicans. He became mayor of Montgeron after the communal elections in 2014.He then became president of the Departmental Council of Essonne in 2015, and was re-elected in the 2021 departmental elections.

Between September and December 2024, he served as minister of transport in the government of Michel Barnier.

He publicly opposed his former friend Nicolas Dupont-Aignan after he rallied far-right Marine Le Pen during the 2017 presidential elections. He ran for deputy in the 2024 snap elections and finished third.
