= Pacôme Rupin =

French politician (born 1985)

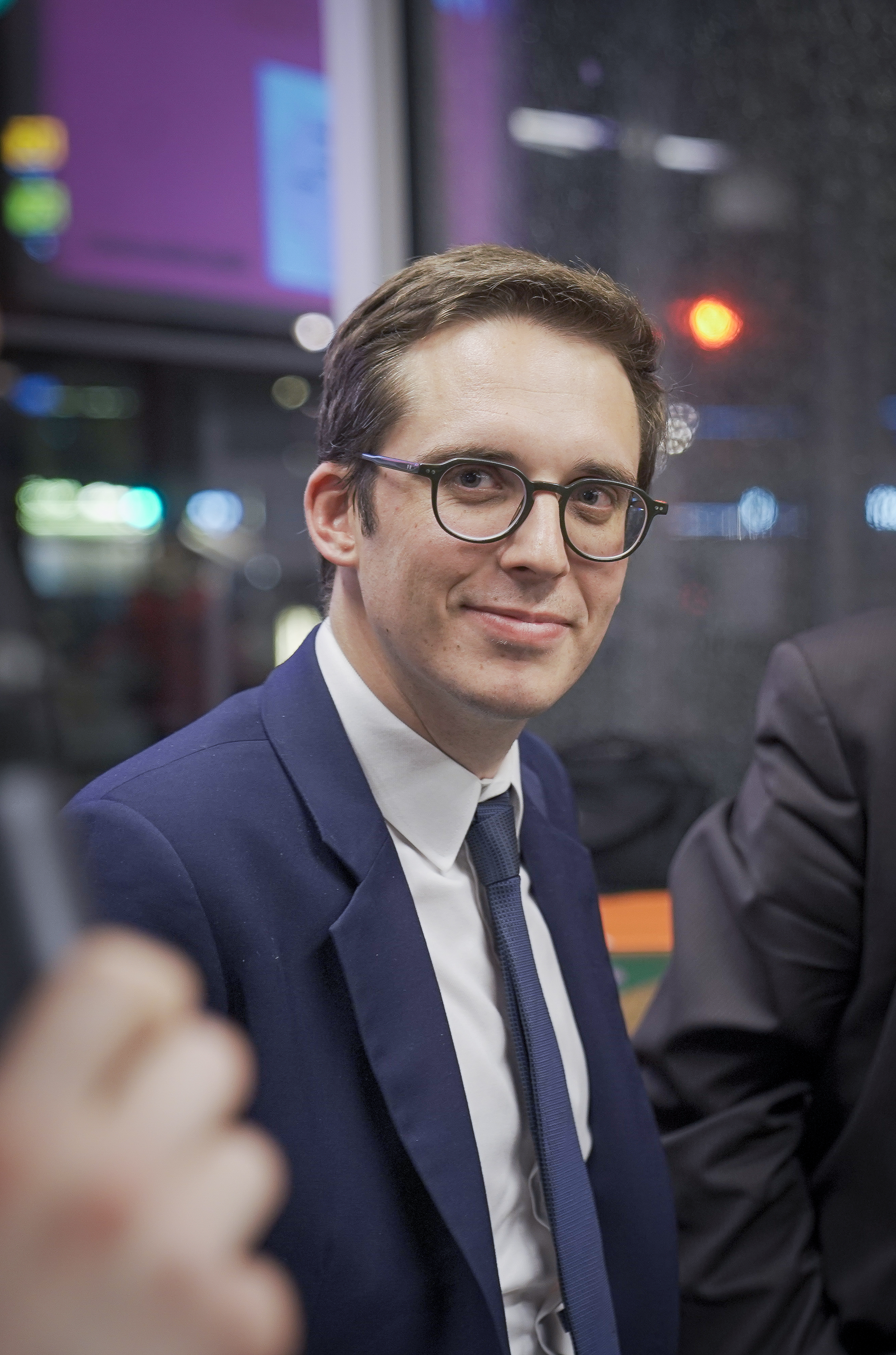
- Rupin in 2019

Member of the National Assembly for Paris's 7th constituency
- In office 21 June 2017 – 21 June 2022
- Preceded by: Patrick Bloche
- Succeeded by: Clément Beaune

Personal details
- Born: 25 January 1985 (age 41) Chambray-lès-Tours, France
- Party: La République En Marche! (2016–present)
- Other political affiliations: Socialist Party (2005–2016)
- Education: Lycée Saint-Jean de Passy
- Alma mater: ESSEC Business School

Pacôme Rupin (French pronunciation: [pakom ʁypɛ̃]; born 25 January 1985) is a French politician who served as a member of the National Assembly from 2017 to 2022, representing the 7th constituency of Paris. A member of La République En Marche! (LREM), his constituency covers the 4th arrondissement, as well as parts of the 11th and 12th arrondissements.

== Political career ==
From 2005 until 2016, Rupin was a member of the Socialist Party. He joined LREM shortly after its launch in 2016.

Upon entering Parliament, Rupin was one of the four deputy chairpersons of the LREM parliamentary group under the leadership of successive chairmen Richard Ferrand (2017–2018) and Gilles Le Gendre (2018–2022). He also served on the Committee on Legal Affairs. In late 2018, he launched an informal group on Grand Paris.

Ahead of the 2020 Paris municipal election, Rupin led a 12-person steering committee set up to prepare the LREM campaign and later served as campaign director for candidate Benjamin Griveaux.

== Political positions ==
In July 2019, Rupin voted in favor of the French ratification of the European Union’s Comprehensive Economic and Trade Agreement (CETA) with Canada.

== Personal life ==
Rupin lives in a civil union with his partner.

== See also ==
- 2017 French legislative election
