= Alain Devaquet =

French politician (1942–2018)

Minister of Higher Education and Research
- In office 20 March 1986 – 8 December 1986
- President: François Mitterrand
- Prime Minister: Jacques Chirac
- Preceded by: Hubert Curien
- Succeeded by: Jacques Valade

Mayor of the 11th arrondissement of Paris
- In office 1983–1995
- Succeeded by: Georges Sarre

Member of the National Assembly for Paris's 7th constituency
- In office 1988–1997
- Preceded by: New constituency
- Succeeded by: Patrick Bloche

Personal details
- Born: 4 October 1942 Raon-l'Étape, France
- Died: 19 January 2018 (aged 75) Villejuif, France
- Party: RPR
- Education: École normale supérieure de Saint-Cloud

Alain Devaquet (4 October 1942 – 19 January 2018) was a French politician who was a minister under Jacques Chirac. A university professor before embarking on his political career with the Rally for the Republic, Devaquet was given the role of junior minister for universities. In this role he became the public face of a controversial proposal to reform the higher education system in 1986, the proposals becoming known as the Devaquet Law, despite originating from more senior members of the government. The plan allowed universities to be more selective in the admission of students and to charge fees.

The reaction against the proposals was strong, with mass protests by students and some strikes in support of their opposition. With the mobilisation of students also closely linked to other proposals aimed at tightening immigration laws, things came to a head with the death of Malik Oussekine, a student bystander who died in police custody on 6 December 1986 and whose death prompted mass outpouring of anger. The law was withdrawn two days later and Devaquet was forced to resign, although the incident proved a strong blow to the government and enhanced the profile of François Mitterrand due to his opposition.
