= Clément Beaune =

French politician (born 1981)

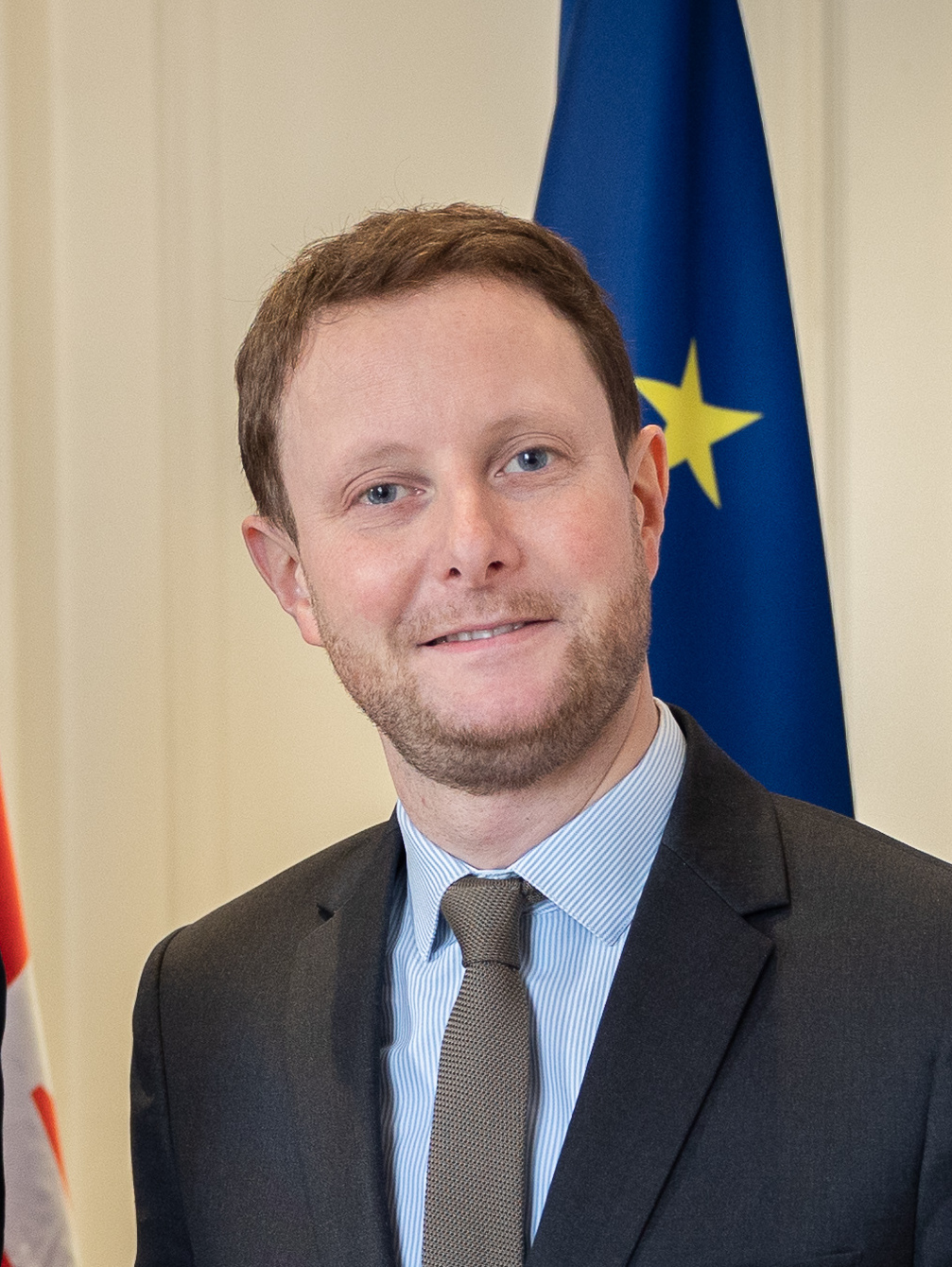
- Beaune in 2023

Minister Delegate for Transport
- In office 4 July 2022 – 11 January 2024
- Prime Minister: Élisabeth Borne
- Preceded by: Jean-Baptiste Djebbari
- Succeeded by: Patrice Vergriete

Secretary of State for European Affairs
- In office 26 July 2020 – 4 July 2022
- Prime Minister: Jean Castex
- Preceded by: Amélie de Montchalin
- Succeeded by: Laurence Boone

Member of the National Assembly for Paris's 7th constituency
- In office 12 February 2024 – 9 June 2024
- Preceded by: Clara Chassaniol
- Succeeded by: Emmanuel Grégoire
- In office 22 June 2022 – 22 July 2022
- Preceded by: Pacôme Rupin
- Succeeded by: Clara Chassaniol

Personal details
- Born: 14 August 1981 (age 45) Paris, France
- Party: Renaissance (since 2022)
- Other political affiliations: Territories of Progress (2020–2022)
- Education: Sciences Po; College of Europe; École nationale d'administration

Clément Beaune (French: [klemɑ̃ bon]; born 14 August 1981) is a French public servant and politician who has been heading France Stratégie since 2025.

Beaune served as Secretary of State for European Affairs (2020–2022) and Minister for Transport (2022–2024) in the governments of Prime Ministers Jean Castex and Élisabeth Borne. Following the resignation of the Borne government in 2024, he again became a member of the National Assembly for Paris's 7th constituency. Although he was reported as a likely candidate to become the Mayor of Paris, he soon lost his seat to Emmanuel Grégoire in the first round of the French legislative elections.

== Background and early life ==
Beaune was born in Paris. His mother was a nurse from Marseille, and his father was a biochemistry teacher and researcher from Auvergne. Beaune is a graduate of Sciences Po (the Institut d'études politiques de Paris), the Bruges College of Europe ("Montesquieu Year", 2004–2005) and the École nationale d'administration ("Willy Brandt Year", 2007–2009). As part of his studies he spent the academic year 2001/2002 in Ireland via the Erasmus Programme, studying at Trinity College Dublin and living with Irish and other European students in a rundown house at the Seapoint Dart station. "Sometimes it was like camping. The heating didn't work and there was rarely hot water. Real student life. It was for me a year of joy and freedom." Beaune has described his family as left-wing. He defines himself as "Delorist". He campaigned for François Hollande in the 2012 presidential election.

== Early career ==
After graduating the École nationale d'administration in 2009, Beaune began his career as a civil servant in the French government's Budget Directorate, as Deputy Head of the Finance Acts Bureau. In 2011, he became Deputy Head of the Research and Higher Education Bureau.

From 2013 to 2014, Beaune worked in the office of Jean-Marc Ayrault, then Prime Minister of France, as a budgetary technical advisor. He then spent a brief period as an Economic, Financial and Monetary Affairs advisor to the French Permanent Representation in Brussels in 2014, before returning to French domestic government service at the Ministry of the Economy and Finance in the same year. Here he initially worked for the offices of both Carole Delga (Secretary of Commerce, Crafts, Consumer Affairs, and Social Solidarity Economy) and Emmanuel Macron (the Minister of the Economy, Industry and Digital Affairs) as European, International and Budgetary Affairs Adviser. From 2015 until 2016 he was reassigned to work exclusively in Macron's office.

From 2016 to 2017, he was Deputy CEO of Groupe ADP.

In 2017, after the election of Emmanuel Macron as President of France, Beaune became a Special Adviser within the Diplomatic Unit of the Presidency of the Republic, specialising in European issues, and on the G20.

Beaune worked on Emmanuel Macron's presidential campaign, advising Macron on European affairs, between February and May 2017.

== Political career ==
Beaune was reportedly considered for ministerial office as Secretary of State for European Affairs in 2019 upon the departure of Nathalie Loiseau; in the event Amélie de Montchalin was appointed. Beaune was also expected to appear on the LREM candidate list in the 2019 European elections. He was subsequently named Secretary of State for European Affairs on 26 July 2020, serving under the Minister for Europe and Foreign Affairs Jean-Yves Le Drian in the Jean Castex government.

In November 2020, Beaune joined the Territoires de progrès Party (TdP), founded earlier in 2020. The party is ideologically on the left wing of the presidential majority.

In October 2023, Beaune participated in the first joint cabinet retreat of the German and French governments in Hamburg, chaired by Chancellor Olaf Scholz and President Emmanuel Macron.

Beaune ran for the 2026 Paris municipal election, in third position on the list for the Council of Paris led by Pierre-Yves Bournazel. While the list received enough votes in the first round to qualify for the second round, Bournazel, pressured by right-wing party leaders, merged his list with the list led by Rachida Dati before the second round. Along with some of their running mates, Beaune and Bournazel decided to withdraw from the merged list. Beaune then announced he would vote for Emmanuel Grégoire in the second round. Beaune also ran in second position on the list for the Conseil d'arrondissement of the 11th arrondissement of Paris led by Delphine Goatern, and wasn't elected.

== Political positions ==
Beaune is considered a leading figure on the left wing of Macron's government and has been said to be on "the center left."

== Personal life ==
In December 2020, Beaune came out as gay in an interview with the French LGBT lifestyle magazine Têtu. Beaune said he wanted to show that being gay was “not an obstacle” to becoming a government minister, and condemned homophobia in other European countries. “I wouldn't want people to say I am fighting against ‘LGBT-free’ zones because I am gay,” he said. “It would be insulting to say I am leading that fight for myself. ... However, as European affairs minister, I have an additional responsibility. I must fight for tolerance.” In the same interview Beaune announced that he planned to visit Polish “LGBT-free” cities early in 2021. He also intended to meet with an abortion rights group in Poland. In the same 2020 interview Beaune disclosed his family background included Jewish relatives who suffered deportation during The Holocaust.

Beaune is a fencing enthusiast.

In 2025, he was made a Knight of the Legion of Honour, alongside 4 other former ministers of Emmanuel Macron.
