= Michel Berson =

French politician (1945–2021)

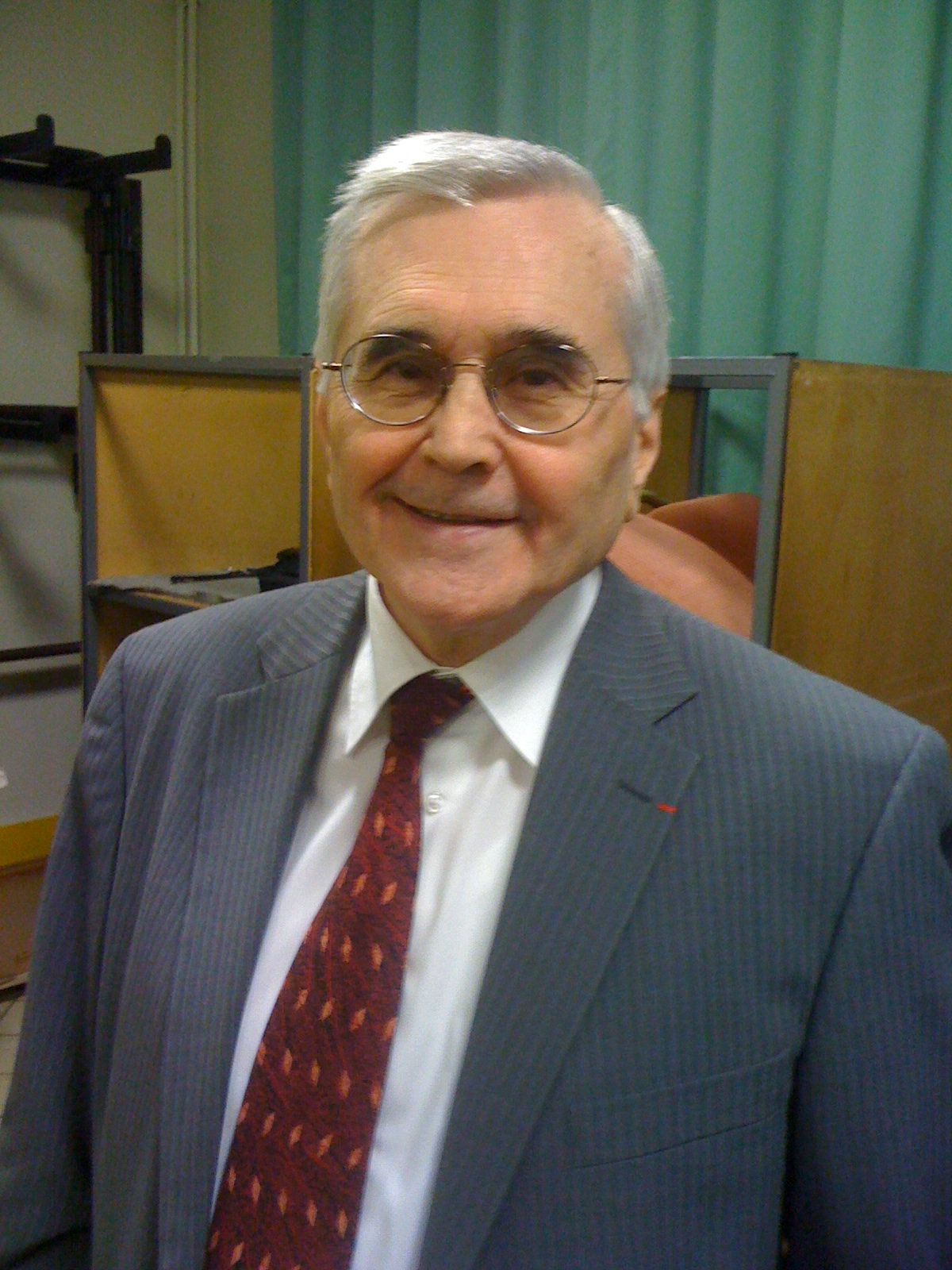

Member of the French Senate for Essonne
- In office 1 October 2011 – 1 October 2017

President of the General council of Essonne
- In office 1998–2011
- Preceded by: Xavier Dugoin
- Succeeded by: Jérôme Guedj

Personal details
- Born: 21 April 1945 Goussainville, France
- Died: 8 April 2021 (aged 75) Villeneuve-Saint-Georges, France
- Party: Socialist Party

Michel Berson (21 April 1945 – 8 April 2021) was a French politician.

Berson was a member of the Senate (2011–2017), a Deputy (1981–1997) and mayor of Crosne (1977–1998).

He was a knight of the Legion of Honour.
