= Canton of Massy =

Administrative division in Essonne, France

Coordinates: 48.73°N 2.27°E

The canton of Massy is an administrative division of the Essonne department, Île-de-France region, northern France. It was created at the French canton reorganisation which came into effect in March 2015. Its seat is in Massy.

It consists of the following communes:

1. Chilly-Mazarin
2. Massy

== History ==
An earlier canton of Massy existed before the 2015 reorganisation. In 1964, a canton centred on Massy was created in the former department of Seine-et-Oise and included the communes of Champlan, Massy, Saulx-les-Chartreux and Wissous. After the creation of the Essonne department, the canton was reorganised in 1967 to include Massy and Wissous. Wissous was transferred to another canton in 1975, and the canton of Massy was abolished in 1985 when its territory was divided between the new cantons of Massy-Est and Massy-Ouest.

The present canton was created by the decree of 24 February 2014 as part of the nationwide cantonal reorganisation and came into effect at the departmental elections of March 2015. It consists of the communes of Chilly-Mazarin and Massy, with Massy serving as its centralising office.

According to the French National Institute of Statistics and Economic Studies (INSEE), the canton has the official geographic code 9112 and comprises the two communes of Chilly-Mazarin and Massy.
