= Massy, Essonne =

Commune in Île-de-France, France

Massy
- Commune
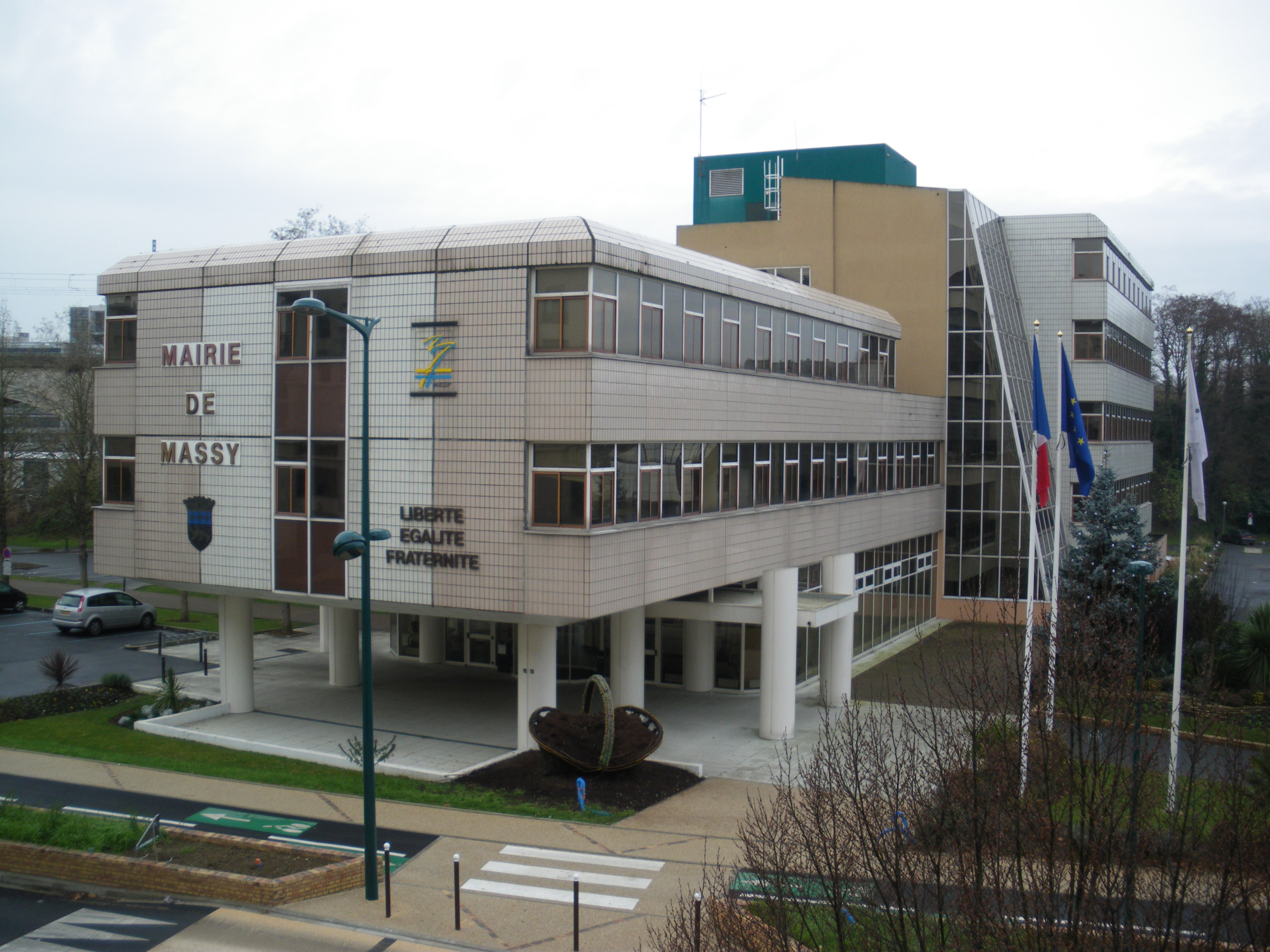
- The Hôtel de Ville

- Coat of arms

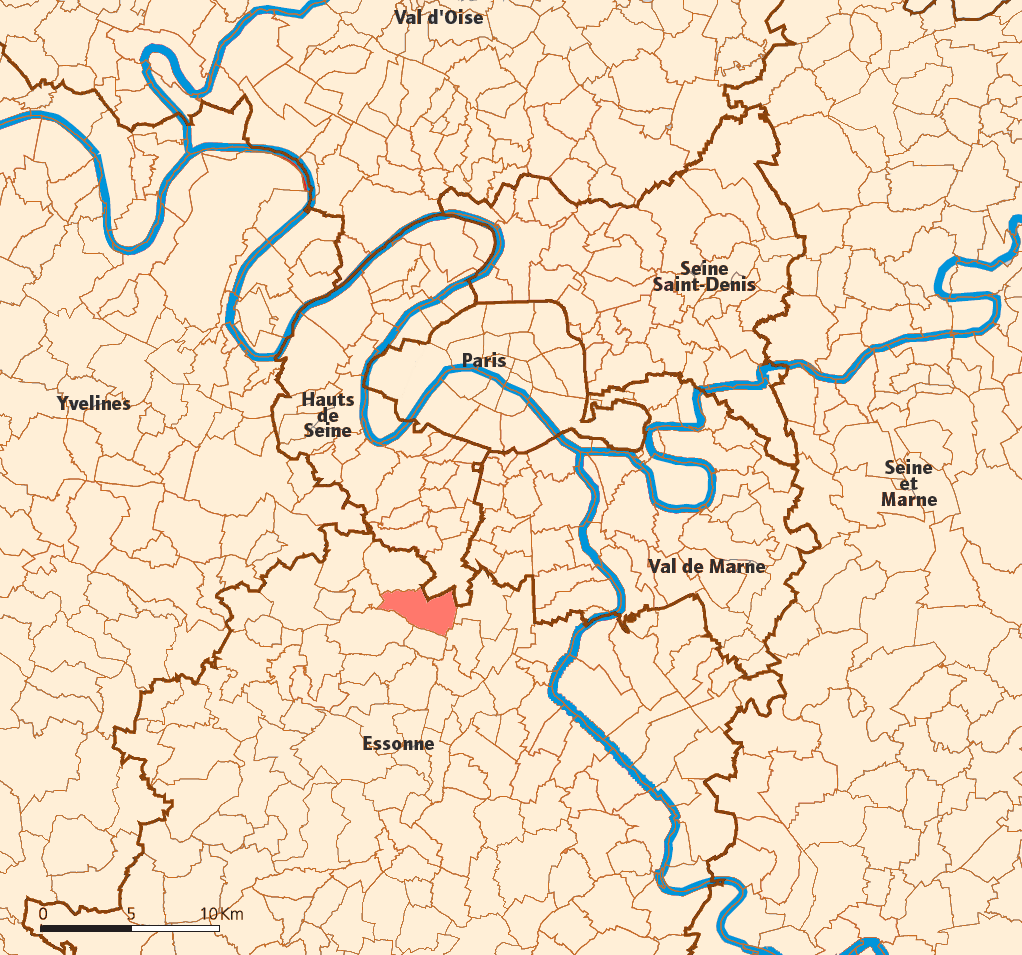
- Location (in red) within Paris inner and outer suburbs
- Location of Massy
- Location within France Location within Île-de-France (region)
- Coordinates: 48°43′51″N 2°16′17″E
- Country: France
- Region: Île-de-France
- Department: Essonne
- Arrondissement: Palaiseau
- Canton: Massy
- Intercommunality: CA Paris-Saclay

Government
  - Mayor (2020–2026): Nicolas Samsoen
- Area^{1}: 9.43 km^{2} (3.64 sq mi)
- Highest elevation: 110 m (360 ft)
- Lowest elevation: 55 m (180 ft)
- Population (2023): 51,729
  - Density: 5,490/km^{2} (14,200/sq mi)
- Time zone: UTC+01:00 (CET)
  - Summer (DST): UTC+02:00 (CEST)
- INSEE/Postal code: 91377 /91300
- ^{1} French Land Register data, which excludes lakes, ponds, glaciers > 1 km^{2} (0.386 sq mi or 247 acres) and river estuaries.

Massy (French pronunciation: [masi]) is a commune in the southern suburbs of Paris, France. It is located 14.7 kilometres (9.1 mi) from the center of Paris.

== Population ==
Massy underwent rapid development within a short period of time, transforming from a large borough of 6,000 inhabitants in 1950 to a town exceeding 37,000 inhabitants in 1968. Since then, its population of around 40,000 has remained relatively stable. Its population grew again after 2000 because of new constructions.

The inhabitants of Massy are known as Massicois in French.

Historical population

| Year | Pop. | ±% p.a. |
|---|---|---|
| 1793 | 1,056 | — |
| 1800 | 969 | −1.22% |
| 1806 | 1,060 | +1.51% |
| 1821 | 1,052 | −0.05% |
| 1831 | 1,080 | +0.26% |
| 1836 | 1,111 | +0.57% |
| 1841 | 1,081 | −0.55% |
| 1846 | 1,074 | −0.13% |
| 1851 | 1,976 | +12.97% |
| 1856 | 1,121 | −10.72% |
| 1861 | 1,174 | +0.93% |
| 1866 | 1,230 | +0.94% |
| 1872 | 1,144 | −1.20% |
| 1876 | 1,179 | +0.76% |
| 1881 | 1,210 | +0.52% |
| 1886 | 1,246 | +0.59% |
| 1891 | 1,266 | +0.32% |
| 1896 | 1,337 | +1.10% |
| 1901 | 1,364 | +0.40% |

| Year | Pop. | ±% p.a. |
|---|---|---|
| 1906 | 1,455 | +1.30% |
| 1911 | 1,745 | +3.70% |
| 1921 | 2,566 | +3.93% |
| 1926 | 3,540 | +6.65% |
| 1931 | 4,589 | +5.33% |
| 1936 | 4,480 | −0.48% |
| 1946 | 6,198 | +3.30% |
| 1954 | 6,380 | +0.36% |
| 1962 | 19,137 | +14.72% |
| 1968 | 37,055 | +11.64% |
| 1975 | 41,344 | +1.58% |
| 1982 | 40,135 | −0.42% |
| 1990 | 38,574 | −0.49% |
| 1999 | 37,712 | −0.25% |
| 2007 | 40,386 | +0.86% |
| 2012 | 43,524 | +1.51% |
| 2017 | 50,833 | +3.15% |
| 2023 | 51,729 | +0.29% |

Source: EHESS and INSEE (1968-2023)

== Transport ==
Massy is served by two interchange stations on Paris RER line B and RER line C: Massy–Verrières and Massy–Palaiseau.

There is also a TGV station, called Massy TGV, which is adjacent to Massy – Palaiseau station and is one of only three specially-built TGV stations in the suburbs of Paris (the two others are at Disneyland Resort Paris and at Charles de Gaulle Airport).

== History ==
The etymological origin of Massy is still very dubious. This name could result from the name of an owner of a villa of the Gallo-Roman time, original site of the village. Called Matius or Matheus, the name of his property then village would have been subjected to deformations due to language and the passing of time to become Massy. Located near the road between Paris and Chartres, the villa was undoubtedly built on a height (the Gaudon Mount) and formed the starting point of a human establishment. The argillaceous subsoil explains the formation of a clearing within the forest and the numerous stretches of water in the surrounding area.

During the Middle Ages and until the end of the Ancien Régime, the lordly estates divided up the territory of the current commune, assigning a majority part to the ecclesiastical institutions and in particular the abbey of St-Germain-des-Prés.

Before 1900, the history of the city was similar to that of the rural boroughs of Île-de-France. After the French Revolution, the town remained rural. The population followed an evolution identical to that of the rest of the region. It underwent the same wars, epidemics and rebellions. The Massicois practiced mainly agricultural trades (gardeners, vine growers), even if local arts and crafts were always present. The tile factory, abandoned after the Second World War, was the town's oldest industry.

It is with the beginning of the 20th century that the face of Massy changes: from being a rural village, it transforms into a town increasing subjected to the attraction of Paris. Once with a population of just 1,400 people, nowadays, the town of Massy holds almost 40,000 inhabitants. At the end of the 19th century, the development of railways supported the construction of industries. The first allotments were born at the beginning of the century. The city's urbanisation developed towards the districts of the Gravels and Villaine, where it was necessary to establish a school as early as 1927. It is the era of the "suburban house".

During the Second World War, the marshalling yard of Massy–Palaiseau was considered a strategic rail junction. The bombardments of these infrastructures caused 88 victims and material damage throughout the town. In the post-war period, the reconstruction and development of the suburbs of Paris and its suburbs metamorphosed the town's geography. The housing crisis provoked an outrage, thus the "castor" movement established some residences in the east of the city. The establishment of a housing scheme on 145 hectares of the communes of Massy-Antony caused the population of Massy to double. The creation of a 'Priority Construction Zone' in Villaine 10 years later was intended to even out the town's urbanisation. This abrupt development of the town also modified its social structure: rejuvenation of the population, arrival of foreigners, etc. During the 1960s and 1970s, questions are raised about rapid urban development: housing problems and shantytowns, lack of public resources, requalification of certain factory sites, delinquency, etc. To satisfy the needs for this new population, many new infrastructures were created such as schools, hospitals, sports centres, swimming pools, arts centres, nurseries and parks. The establishment of a TGV station in 1991 is an asset for the economic development of the city. Nowadays, certain amenities have an influence which exceeds the communal and departmental circles, in particular opera and theatre. (Author: Municipal archives of Massy).

The Hôtel de Ville was completed in around 1986.

== Administration ==
Massy is divided into two cantons:

The canton of Massy-Est contains 18,316 inhabitants; The canton of Massy-Ouest contains 19,396 inhabitants.

== Sports ==
Massy has a professional sports team in Rugby (Rugby Club Massy Essonne, playing Federal 1, third level of Rugby in France) and Handball (Massy Essonne HandBall, playing in ProLigue, second level of Handball in France). Massy has one association football team in FC Massy 91. Massy also has major sports associations in climbing and swimming.

== Personalities ==
- Nicolas Appert, inventor of the process of canning, in 1802 created a workshop in Massy employing fifty people in order to produce the preserves which have made it famous. The factory was destroyed in 1815, following the Prussian invasion. Nicolas Appert returned to Massy in 1836 and died there on 1 June 1841.

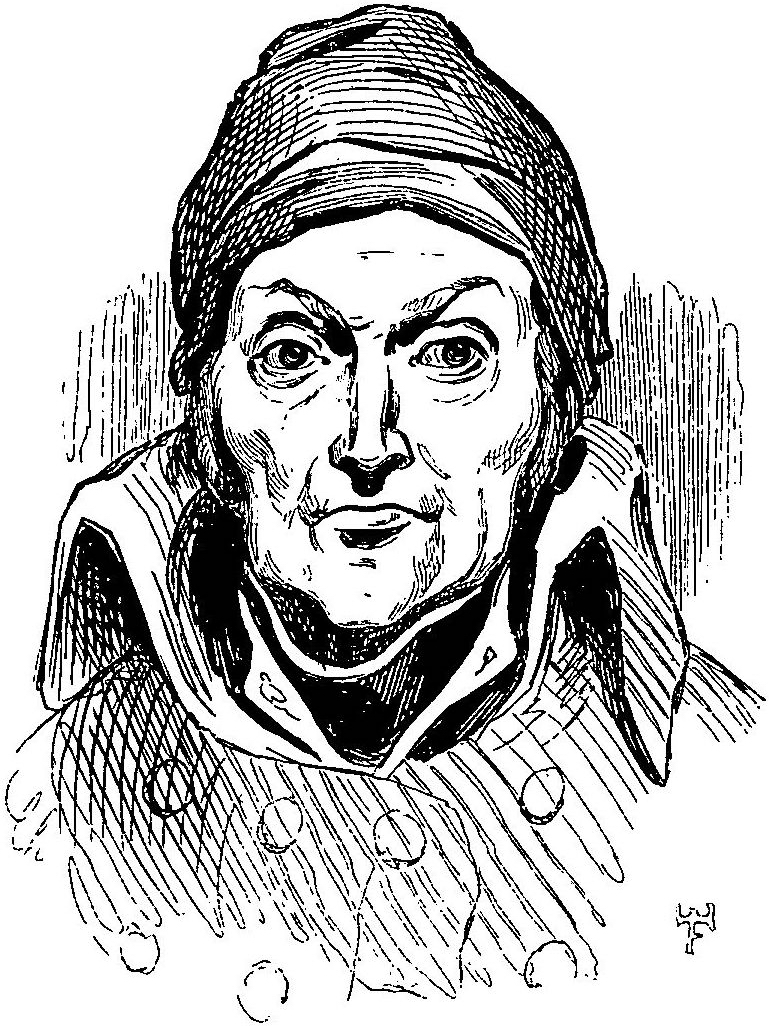
Nicolas Appert

- Numa Denis Fustel de Coulanges, a famous historian, lived in Massy from 1883 until 1889, date of his death.
- Jacques-René Tenon was a surgeon in Salpêtrière. He owes his fame to the combat which he led for the development of hygiene in hospitals. He thus imposed the installation of individual beds and the isolation of patients with contagious diseases. Today his estate accommodates the Orphelins Apprentis d'Auteuil.
- Princess Antoinette of Monaco was officially designated Baroness of Massy by her younger brother, Rainier III, in 1951. The style Baron/Baroness de Massy has since become that of the members of her cadet branch of the princely family.
- Alain Chabat, actor, film director and producer
- Yorane Julians, basketball player
- Johan Martial, footballer for Panetolikos
- Dorian Martial ex-captain of CO Les Ulis
- Anthony Martial, footballer for C.F. Monterrey
- Yaya Sanogo, footballer
- Yvonnick Prené, jazz musician
- Pierre Ekwah, footballer for AS Saint-Etienne

== Places and monuments ==
- Château de Vilgénis : Built in 1823 in a 55-hectare park. In the park, a pond in the form of Napoleon's Bicornate was dug by the emperor's young brother, Jerôme Bonaparte.
- Massy has an opéra-théâtre which plays an important part in the Essonian cultural life.
- Massy also has an arts cinema consisting of three rooms projecting films with their original soundtrack. Prices: €6.80 per showing or €4.60 with a season ticket costing €5 a year.

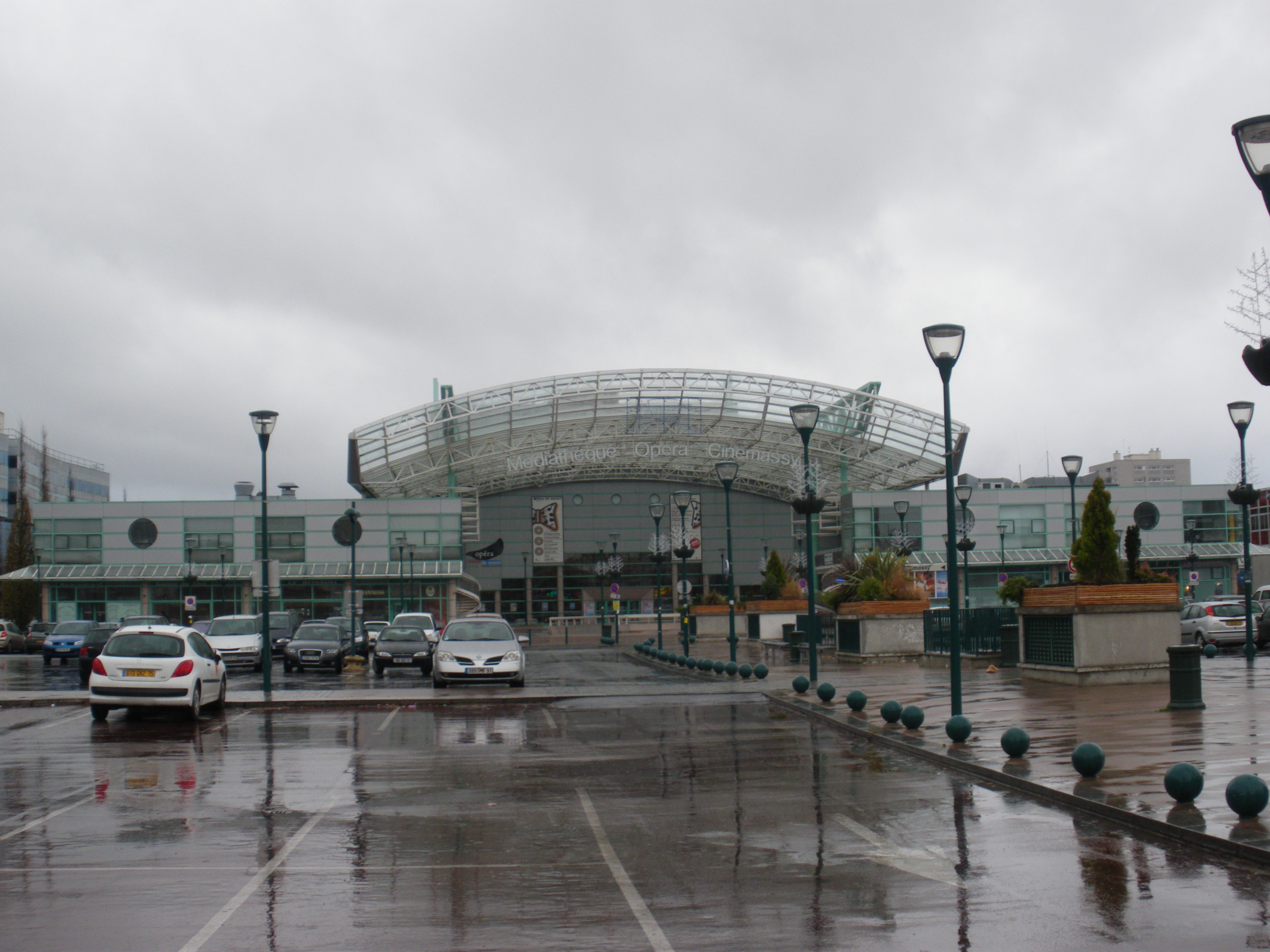
Massy Opéra

== Economy ==
On 1 July 2010 Alstom inaugurated the new head office of its Energy Management Business (EMB) division in Massy. At the time the office had 600 employees.

Large establishments located in the town's business parks include Safran Electronics & Defense.

== Education ==
The commune has an integrated school, 16 preschools, and 12 elementary schools. There are three public junior high schools operated by Essonne: Collège Blaise Pascal, Collège Denis Diderot, and Collège Gérard Philipe. There are three senior high schools operated by Île de France: Lycée du Parc de Vilgénis, Lycée Fuste de Coulanges, and Lycée Professionnel Gustave Eiffel.

Tertiary education:

- AgroParisTech
- Faculté des Métiers de l’Essonne
- CFA des Métiers de l'Aérien

== See also ==
- Communes of the Essonne department
