= Lucie Castets =

French civil servant (born 1987)

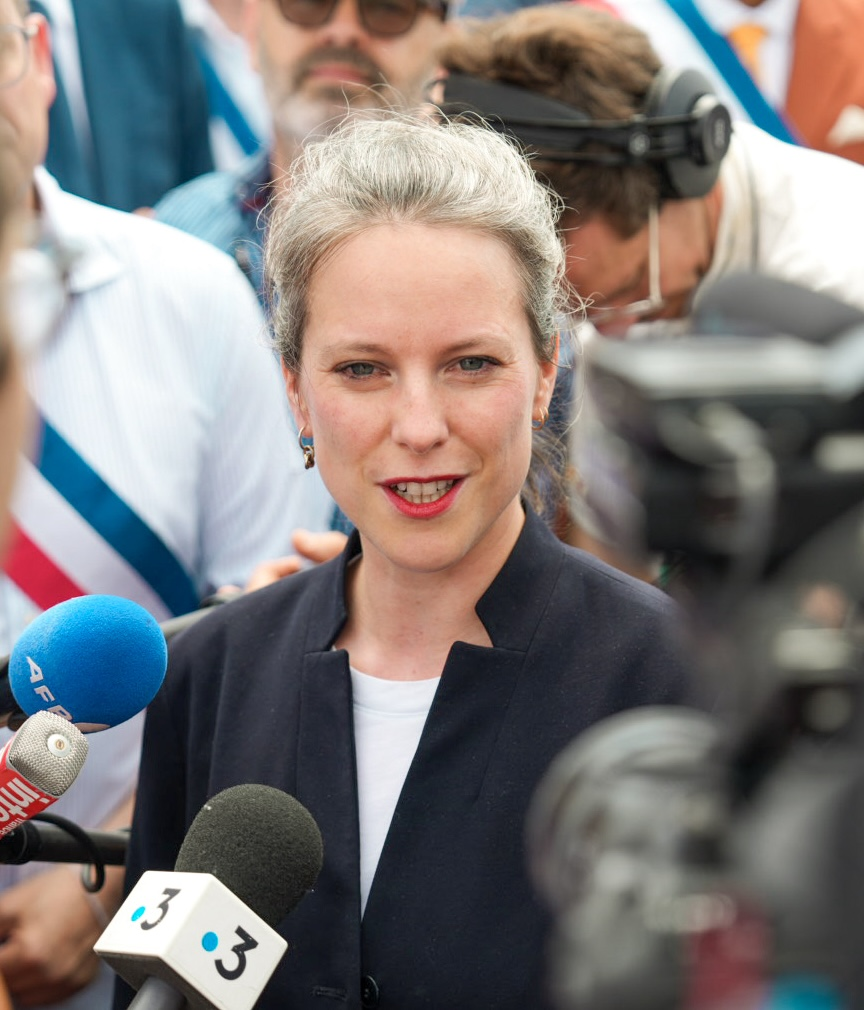
- Castets in 2024

Mayor of the 12th arrondissement of Paris
- Incumbent
- Assumed office 6 April 2026
- Preceded by: Emmanuelle Pierre-Marie

Member of the Council of Paris
- Incumbent
- Assumed office 29 March 2026
- Mayor: Emmanuel Grégoire

Metropolitan councillor of the Métropole du Grand Paris
- Incumbent
- Assumed office 13 April 2026
- President: Patrick Ollier

Chief financial officer of Paris
- In office October 2023 – 4 November 2024
- Preceded by: Arnaud Stotzenbach
- Succeeded by: Guillaume Tinlot

Personal details
- Born: 3 March 1987 (age 39) Caen, France
- Other political affiliations: PS (2008–2011)
- Children: 1
- Education: Sciences Po (BA; MA); London School of Economics (MA); Fudan University; École nationale d'administration
- Occupation: Economist; civil servant; politician

Lucie Castets (French: [lysi kaste]; born 3 March 1987) is a French politician, former civil servant and economist. Formerly associated with the Socialist Party, Castets was nominated by the New Popular Front (NFP) to serve as Prime Minister of France in the aftermath of the 2024 legislative election, but her candidacy was rejected by president Emmanuel Macron. Since April 2026, she serves as the mayor of the 12th arrondissement of Paris.

== Early life and education ==
Castets was born in Caen to parents who worked as psychoanalysts, and resided in Caen up until the age of 18. She studied at the lycée Charles-de-Gaulle in Caen, and afterwards studied political economy and public law at Sciences Po. She received a master's degree from Sciences Po and the London School of Economics and studied Chinese at Fudan University in Shanghai, before graduating from the École nationale d'administration in 2013.

== Civil service career ==
Castets began her career in the French civil service in 2007, working as an assistant to the cultural attaché at the Consulate-General of France in Shanghai between 2007 and 2008. She became involved with the World Bank in 2011, primarily working on projects involving financial intelligence. In 2014, she was working at the Direction générale du Trésor within the Ministry of Economics and Finance, and then became the government commissioner to the Bureau central de tarification.

Between 2018 and 2020, Castets headed a section at Tracfin within the Ministry of Economics and Finance, the intelligence agency responsible for combating illegal financial circuits, money laundering, and the financing of terrorism. In 2020, Castets joined the administration of mayor of Paris Anne Hidalgo, becoming an economic advisor. In October 2023, she was appointed by Hidalgo to serve as Director of Finance and Purchasing in Hidalgo's office.

== Academic career ==
Between 2014 and 2017, Castets was a lecturer of economics at Sciences Po. In 2022, she became a part-time associate professor of economics at Paris Dauphine University, and has also been published in the journal Alternatives économiques.

In 2025 she published an essay on public services and fiscal choices.

== Political career ==
Castets was a member of the Socialist Party between 2008 and 2011, when she was a supporter of Martine Aubry and the Union of the Left. Castets entered elected politics for the first time after being selected to stand as a candidate for the Socialist Party in the 2015 regional election in Normandy, although she was not elected.

Castets left the Socialist Party in 2011, due to disagreements with the political direction of François Hollande.

In 2021, Castets cofounded the Nos services publics collective, which seeks to "highlight dysfunctions and make proposals" to improve public services in France. She received public attention in 2022, when she questioned Stanislas Guerini on the television program Ce soir about the unwarranted use of consulting firms.

=== Prime ministerial nomination ===
In July 2024, Castets was nominated by the New Popular Front as their candidate for prime minister of France, in the aftermath of the 2024 legislative election in which the NFP won the most seats but not a majority. Following her nomination, Castets said that her political priorities were reversing the pension reform by Emmanuel Macron, a tax reform to make sure that "all pay their fair share", and to improve purchasing power by raising salaries and social benefit payments.

Macron dismissed her nomination, initially saying that he would not make any decisions before the end of the 2024 Summer Olympics and that "the question is not a name", but which governmental majority would be formed in the National Assembly. Castets rejected forming a coalition with Macron's Ensemble group due to what she said were profound disagreements, and urged Macron to accept her nomination. The president declined to appoint Castets again in late August because other parties said that they would topple a NFP minority government, and in September appointed Michel Barnier of Les Républicains instead.

=== 2026 Paris municipal election ===
In January 2026, Castets joined the list led by Emmanuel Grégoire for the 2026 Paris municipal election, a left-wing alliance excluding La France Insoumise. On 24 February 2026, she was chosen as the alliance's lead candidate in the 12th arrondissement of Paris, replacing outgoing Ecologist mayor Emmanuelle Pierre-Marie, who had been weakened by allegations of toxic management.

In the second round, her list won the arrondissement with 47.51% of the vote, ahead of lists led by Valérie Montandon, Caroline Mécary and Clara Chassaniol. She was elected to the Council of Paris and became a metropolitan councillor of the Métropole du Grand Paris. On 6 April 2026, she was elected mayor of the 12th arrondissement at the first meeting of the new arrondissement council.

== Positions and op-eds ==
In December 2024, Castets co-authored (with political scientist Bertrand Badie) an op-ed in Libération urging stronger French action to protect civilians in Gaza and Lebanon. In May 2025, she co-signed an op-ed calling for EU sanctions against Israeli leaders responsible for mass violence in Gaza and for recognition of the state of Palestine.

== Personal life ==
Castets is married to a woman and they have two children. She played tennis for about ten years, and served as ball girl at the French Open at the age of 15.

== Publications ==
- Où sont passés nos milliards ?, Seuil, 2025."Où sont passés nos milliards ?". Éditions du Seuil (in French). 2 May 2025."« Où sont passés nos milliards » : Lucie Castets muscle le programme de gauche". Les Inrockuptibles (in French). 15 May 2025."Pourquoi les services publics se dégradent… Débat Castets–Darbois". Le Monde (in French). 18 May 2025.
