= 2026 Paris municipal election =

Local election in France

- 15 March 2026 (first round); 22 March 2026 (second round)

All 163 members of the Council of Paris 82 seats needed for a majority
- Turnout: 58.89% (first round) ▲16.59 pp 61.60% (second round) ▲24.90 pp
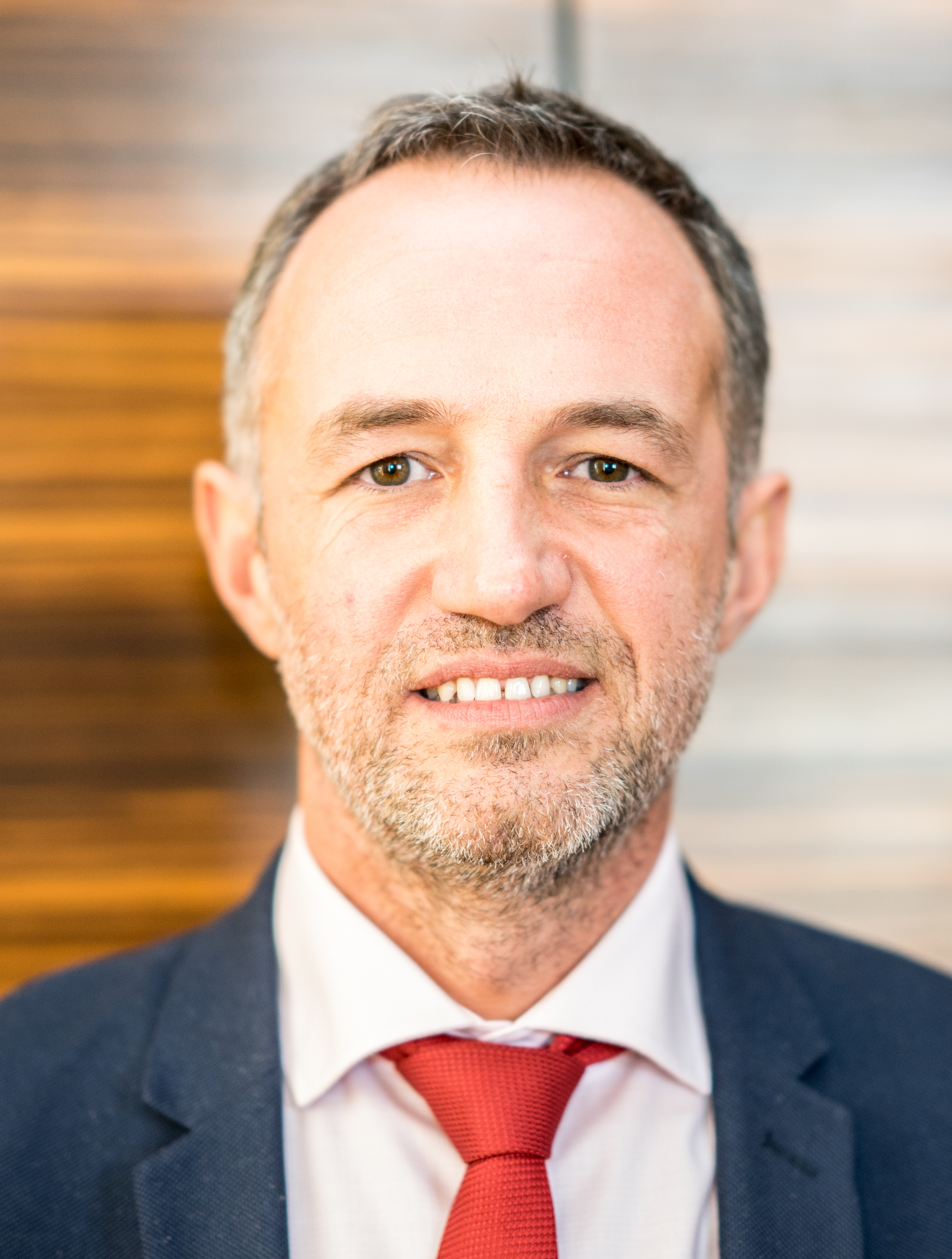

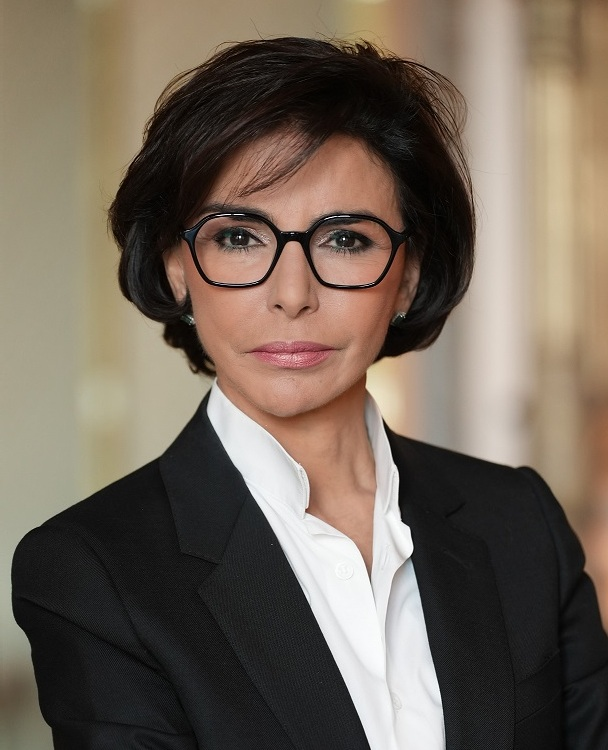

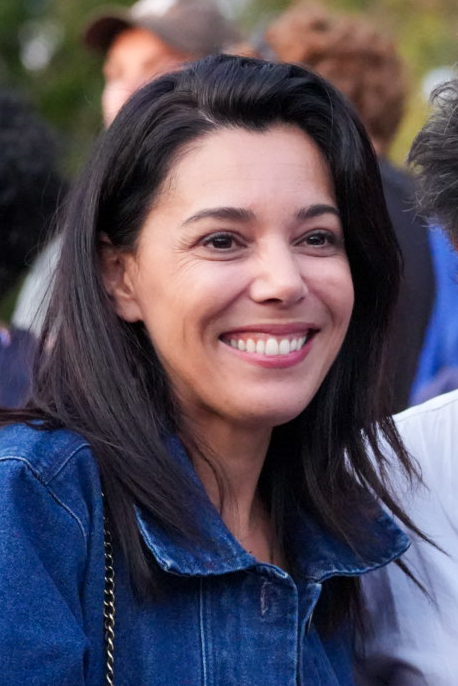
	First party	Second party	Third party
Candidate	Emmanuel Grégoire	Rachida Dati	Sophia Chikirou
Party	PS	LR	LFI
Alliance	Endorsed by: The Ecologists; French Communist Party; Place Publique; L'Après; Republican and Socialist Left	Endorsed by: Union of Democrats and Independents; Democratic Movement; Radical Party; Horizons (Note: After Pierre-Yves Bournazel withdrew before the second round.); Renaissance; The Centrists; Cap21; Independent Ecological Movement	Endorsed by: Left Party; Independent Workers' Party
Last election	96 seats	66 seats (Note: Includes parties that ran separately in the 2020 election but endorsed Dati in the second round of this election.)	1 seat
Seats won	103	51	9
Seat change	▲7	▼15	▲8
Popular vote	309,693	207,613	95,551
Percentage	37.98%	25.46%	11.72%
Popular vote (2nd)	428,143	351,825	67,464
Percentage (2nd)	50.52%	41.52%	7.96%
Mayor before election
Anne Hidalgo
PS
Elected Mayor
Emmanuel Grégoire
PS

The 2026 Paris municipal election was held on 15 March 2026, with a runoff on 22 March to elect the 163 members of the Council of Paris and the 17 arrondissement councils. The Council of Paris subsequently elected the Mayor of Paris, while the arrondissement councils elected their respective mayors. The election followed the two-term tenure of incumbent Mayor Anne Hidalgo, the first woman to serve as mayor, who announced in November 2024 that she would not seek a third term.

The main candidates were Emmanuel Grégoire of the Socialist Party (PS), Rachida Dati of The Republicans (LR), Sophia Chikirou of La France Insoumise (LFI), Pierre-Yves Bournazel of Horizons, and Sarah Knafo of Reconquête. Grégoire finished first in the first round with 37.98% of the vote, followed by Dati with 25.46%. Chikirou received 11.72%, Bournazel 11.34%, and Knafo 10.40%. Following the first round, Bournazel merged his list with Dati's while Knafo withdrew her candidacy and endorsed Dati.

In the second round, Grégoire received 50.52% of the vote and his alliance won 103 of the 163 seats. Dati received 41.52% and won 51 seats while Chikirou received 7.96% and won the remaining 9 seats. Grégoire was elected mayor, extending the Socialist Party's 25-year hold on Paris.

== Background ==
Anne Hidalgo, a member of the Socialist Party (PS), was first elected mayor of Paris in 2014 and re-elected in 2020, serving during major events including the 2015 terrorist attacks, the COVID-19 pandemic, and the 2024 Summer Olympics. Her administration focused on urban transformation projects such as the "15-minute city" concept and expanding social housing. The number of cars in the city has been reduced, with 100 streets having permanently banned traffic. Despite some controversies and declining popularity, she remained a central figure in Parisian politics until her decision not to run in 2026, endorsing Senator Rémi Féraud as her preferred successor. The 2020 municipal elections were marked by low turnout (42% in the first round) due to the pandemic. Hidalgo formed an alliance with The Ecologists in the second round, increasing her majority by five seats. The opposition The Republicans list led by Rachida Dati lost 13 seats, holding 58 council seats, while the LREM list led by Agnès Buzyn won eight seats. La France Insoumise (LFI) held a single seat.

== Electoral system ==
Under the 2025 PLM law, from 2026 onward, Parisians cast two ballots, one for the Council of Paris, and one for the arrondissement councils, each of which is presided over by a mayor. The reform was strongly supported by Rachida Dati, who was Minister of Culture at the time. Under the new law, councilors are elected from party lists using a two-round system. If no list achieves a majority on the first round, a second round is held on the following Sunday. Lists that receive at least 10 percent of the vote in the first round may participate in the second round, while lists receiving between 5 and 10 percent may merge with qualifying lists. The first-place finisher receives a majority bonus equal to 25 percent of the seats in the Council of Paris or 50 percent of the seats in the arrondissement councils, while the remaining seats are allocated proportionately. The mayors of Paris and the arrondissements are elected by the respective councils during the first plenary session. Mayors are chosen by majority vote in the first two rounds, or by plurality in the third round. In the event of a tie in the third round, the oldest candidate is elected.

== Candidates ==
=== Lists ===
List	Party	Head of list
Lutte Ouvrière - The Workers' Camp (Lutte ouvrière - Le camp des travailleurs)	Lutte Ouvrière	Marielle Saulnier
Let's Take Back Paris (Retrouvons Paris)	National Rally – The Popular Right – Union of the Right for the Republic – Rally for the Republic – Identity-Liberties – French Future	Thierry Mariani
Paris Is Yours! with Emmanuel Grégoire – The Union of the Left and Ecologists (Paris est à vous ! avec Emmanuel Grégoire - L'union de la gauche et des écologistes)	Socialist Party – French Communist Party – The Ecologists – Place Publique – L’Après – Republican and Socialist Left	Emmanuel Grégoire
NPA Revolutionaries – Paris, Working-Class and Revolutionary (NPA Révolutionnaires - Paris, ouvrière et révolutionnaire)	New Anticapitalist Party	Blandine Chauvel
Sarah Knafo for Paris – A Happy City (Sarah Knafo pour Paris - Une ville heureuse)	Reconquête	Sarah Knafo
A Peaceful Paris with Pierre-Yves Bournazel (Paris apaisé avec Pierre-Yves Bournazel)	Horizons – Renaissance – The Centrists – Cap21 – Independent Ecological Movement	Pierre-Yves Bournazel
Change Paris with Rachida Dati (Changer Paris avec Rachida Dati)	The Republicans – Democratic Movement – Union of Democrats and Independents – Radical Party	Rachida Dati
The New Popular Paris (Le Nouveau Paris populaire)	La France Insoumise – Left Party – Independent Workers' Party	Sophia Chikirou
Enough with Budget Cuts in Paris! (Les coupes budgétaires à Paris ça suffit !)	Workers' Party	Mahel Pierot-Guimbaud

=== Socialist Party ===
The outgoing Socialist mayor, Anne Hidalgo, announced on 26 November 2024, that she would not seek a third term and endorsed Senator Rémi Féraud, president of the Socialist group on the Paris Council, as her preferred successor. Her former first deputy, Emmanuel Grégoire, who had been elected to the National Assembly in the 2024 legislative election, also entered the race for the party's nomination. In January 2026, Hidalgo publicly claimed that "the left would lose" if Grégoire were chosen as its candidate. Grégoire later said, "She did everything she could to torpedo my candidacy. I'm not her candidate and I am not her heir."

Marion Waller, director of the Pavillon de l'Arsenal, joined the contest in May 2025. The Socialist Party scheduled its internal vote for 30 June 2025. During the campaign, former Paris mayor Bertrand Delanoë publicly backed Emmanuel Grégoire. On 30 June 2025, Grégoire secured the nomination in the first round of voting. He later received the backing of The Ecologists, the French Communist Party, Place Publique, and other smaller left-wing parties.

Candidate	Votes	Of total
Emmanuel Grégoire		52,61%
Rémi Féraud		44,33%
Marion Waller		3,06%

=== The Republicans ===
The mayor of Paris's 7th arrondissement and Minister of Culture, Rachida Dati, announced on January 17, 2024, that she would run for mayor of Paris for a third time. Senator and former mayor of the 16th arrondissement, Francis Szpiner, declared his candidacy on March 12, 2025, seeking the party's nomination and proposing an alliance with The Centrists. During the campaign, he criticized Dati as a "candidate of Macronism".

The internal contest was overshadowed by legal controversies involving both candidates. On 15 April 2025, searches were carried out at Francis Szpiner's home and at the 16th arrondissement town hall as part of an investigation into alleged corruption and influence peddling linked to social housing allocations. Meanwhile, Rachida Dati, under formal investigation in connection with the Carlos Ghosn affair, failed in June 2025 to overturn the National Financial Prosecutor's final submissions. On December 18, 2025, further searches took place at the 7th arrondissement town hall, the Ministry of Culture, and her home as part of a judicial investigation related to her former role as a Member of the European Parliament, including allegations that she had lobbied on behalf of Renault.

On August 28, 2025, the national nomination committee of The Republicans selected Rachida Dati as the party's candidate. Following this decision, Francis Szpiner withdrew his candidacy. Dati later secured the backing of the Democratic Movement, notably through the support of its Paris leader, Maud Gatel. However, the presidential party Renaissance opted to support a different candidate, confirming on October 28, 2025, its endorsement of Pierre-Yves Bournazel. Her refusal to take part in many media-organized debates ultimately led to their cancellation.

=== La France Insoumise ===
In autumn 2025, several media outlets reported that Deputy Sophia Chikirou was set to lead the list of La France Insoumise for the 2026 municipal election. On November 14, 2025, Chikirou officially declared her candidacy for mayor of Paris under the slogan "The New Popular Paris". On 29 January 2026, Ecologists elected officials Jérôme Gleizes and Émile Meunier announced they were joining Sophia Chikirou's list, breaking with their party's strategy. According to Le Monde, 20% of the spots on LFI lists in Paris were reserved for them as part of an agreement with dissident Ecologists officials grouped under the label "Popular Greens".

=== Horizons – Renaissance ===
Pierre-Yves Bournazel, a member of Horizons and councillor in Paris's 18th arrondissement and former Deputy, announced in June 2025 that he would run for mayor of Paris. Renaissance ultimately settled on 28 October 2025, officially endorsing Bournazel rather than supporting Rachida Dati. This decision reflected broader national agreements between Renaissance and Horizons across several cities. However, the choice sparked internal tensions, particularly among Paris-based party members who favored backing Dati. In early February 2026, The Centrists also announced its support for Bournazel.

=== Reconquête! ===
Sarah Knafo, a Member of the European Parliament for Reconquête, announced her candidacy for mayor of Paris on January 7, 2026. Her campaign has emphasized strong digital communication and focused on themes such as security, cleanliness, and city management. In February 2026, reports citing a study from Nature suggested that the algorithm of X may have amplified her content, raising questions about potential platform influence. She also proposed a “union of the right” with Rachida Dati ahead of a possible second round. Around the same time, Aurélie Assouline and later Marie Toubiana, both members of The Republicans, joined or backed her campaign.

=== National Rally ===
Thierry Mariani, Member of the European Parliament for the National Rally, announced his candidacy for mayor of Paris in June 2023 and confirmed it in December 2025. His list was supported by the Union of the Right for the Republic. In January 2026, the association La Maison des potes filed a complaint against him over a proposal on “national priority” in social housing.

=== The Ecologists ===
The Senator and Ecologists candidate in the 2022 presidential election, Yannick Jadot, announced on January 20, 2025, his intention to run for mayor of Paris. Ten days later, he declared that he would not participate in the party's primary, after calling on other candidates to withdraw in his favor. The Ecologists held their primary on 16–23 March 2025. Four candidates competed in the first round: deputy mayor David Belliard, Anne-Claire Boux, Fatoumata Koné, and Aminata Niakaté. Belliard and Boux advanced to the second round with 48% and 27% of the vote respectively, ahead of Koné (15%) and Niakaté (10%). Between the two rounds, both eliminated candidates endorsed Boux. On 23 March 2025, David Belliard won the runoff with 52.6% of the vote and was designated the Ecologists’ lead candidate. He later withdrew in favor of Emmanuel Grégoire and joined his list as part of a broader left-wing alliance.

Candidate	First round		Second round	
Candidate	Votes	Of total	Votes	Of total
David Belliard		48%		52.6%
Anne-Claire Boux		27%		47.4%
Fatoumata Koné		15%	—	
Aminata Niakaté		10%	—	

== Campaign ==
The campaign gained momentum in late 2024 after Anne Hidalgo announced she would not seek a third term, while remaining in office until 2026 and preparing her succession within the governing left.

=== Alliances and strategy ===
Following the Socialist nomination, the Socialist Party (PS), The Ecologists (LE), and the French Communist Party (PCF) formed a joint first-round list, unveiled in December 2025 and led by Emmanuel Grégoire, with David Belliard and Ian Brossat among its figures. To the left, La France insoumise (LFI) pursued an independent strategy, nominating Sophia Chikirou and rejecting a first-round alliance with Grégoire.

On the right and centre-right, competition between Rachida Dati and Pierre-Yves Bournazel was marked by calls for unity. Bournazel maintained a “neither Dati nor Grégoire” stance, while leaving open the possibility of second-round negotiations. On the far right, the National Rally fielded a list led by Thierry Mariani, aiming primarily to secure representation on the Council of Paris. Meanwhile, Reconquête candidate Sarah Knafo entered the race in January 2026, seeking to distinguish her campaign from that of the RN.

=== Key issues ===
Media coverage and campaign platforms highlighted several recurring themes:

- Housing and social diversity: Access to affordable housing, the balance between social and intermediate housing, conversions of offices to housing, and regulation of the housing market were prominent topics across left-wing programmes and debated by opponents of the outgoing majority.
- Urban mobility and environment: Debates focused on reducing car traffic, expanding cycling and pedestrian areas, and assessing the legacy of ecological policies in Paris.
- Public safety and cleanliness: Public safety, municipal policing, public lighting and cleanliness featured prominently, particularly in right-wing and far-right campaigns, alongside debates on the organisation of city services.
- Electoral reform: The campaign also took place after the adoption of the 11 August 2025 reform of the “PLM” electoral law for Paris, Lyon and Marseille, which introduced two ballots (for the Council of Paris and for arrondissement councils) from the 2026 municipal elections onward.
- Coalition building and fragmentation: Strategic questions included the durability and scope of the PS–LE–PCF alliance against LFI's independent campaign, and whether the right and the presidential camp could coordinate in a potential second round.

=== Between the first and second round ===
Five lists, led by Grégoire, Dati, Chikirou, Bournazel, and Knafo qualified for the second round. Grégoire refused to merge his list with the list led by Chikirou: the two lists were separately present for the second round. Despite earlier ruling it out, Bournazel eventually agreed, under pressure from right-wing leaders, to merge his list with Dati's, though he chose not to run personally on the joint list, alongside some allies such as Clément Beaune.

After unsuccessful offers to merge her list with Dati, Knafo withdrew her list from the second round, declaring she was not withdrawing for Dati, but withdrawing "for Paris", to block the left. Following this, Grégoire accused President Emmanuel Macron of personally intervening to convince her to leave the race to the profit of Dati, a claim that Macron denied. On 18 March 2026, BFM TV hosted a three-hour debate between Chikirou, Grégoire, and Dati.

== Polling ==

=== First round ===
Polling firm	Fieldwork date	Sample size	Saulnier LO	Chikirou LFI	Belliard LE	Grégoire PS	Bournazel HOR	Dati LR	Mariani RN	Knafo REC	Others
2026 Paris municipal election	15 Mar 2026		0.68%	11.72%	—	37.98%	11.34%	25.46%	1.61%	10.40%	0.82%
OpinionWay	5-10 Mar 2026	1,066	<1%	13%	—	31%	12%	26%	5%	12%	1-2%
Elabe	27 Feb - 6 Mar 2026	1,000	<1%	10,5%	—	32%	12%	26.5%	3%	13.5%	2.5%
Ifop	2-5 Mar 2026	1,065	0.5%	10%	—	33%	11.5%	29%	3%	12%	1%
Ipsos	20-28 Feb 2026	439	0.5%	10%	—	35%	11.5%	27%	4%	11.5%	0.5%
Cluster17	24-26 Feb 2026	1,103	0.5%	12.5%	—	32%	11%	27%	3%	11%	2.5%
OpinionWay	16-23 Feb 2026	1,073	1%	11%	—	31%	12%	27%	4%	12%	2%
Cluster17	24-26 Feb 2026	1,103	0.5%	12.5%	—	32%	11%	27%	3%	11%	3%
OpinionWay	16-23 Feb 2026	1,073	1%	11%	—	31%	12%	27%	4%	12%	2%
Ifop	16-19 Feb 2026	991	<1%	11%	—	32%	12%	30%	4%	11%	—
OpinionWay	11-16 Feb 2026	970	2%	12%	—	30%	14%	24%	5%	11%	2%
Harris	1-3 Feb 2026	1,150	1%	10%	—	31%	14%	27%	5%	12%	—
Cluster17	28-31 Jan 2026	1,201	1%	12%	—	33%	14%	26%	4%	10%	—
Ifop	20-23 Jan 2026	988	1%	11%	—	32%	14%	28%	5%	9%	—
Ifop	5-9 Jan 2026	983	1%	10%	—	30%	16%	28%	7%	8%	—
Elabe	2-9 Jan 2026	1,014	<1%	11%	—	33%	16%	26%	5%	9%	—
	17 Dec 2025	Belliard withdraws in support of Grégoire									
Ipsos	5-12 Dec 2025	849	—	12%	14%	20%	13%	27%	7%	7%	—
Ipsos	5-12 Dec 2025	849	—	13%	—	32%	14%	27%	7%	7%	—
Ipsos	5-12 Dec 2025	849	—	13%	32%	—	14%	27%	7%	7%	—
Cluster17	26-29 Nov 2025	1,172	—	13%	13%	21%	13.5%	26%	6%	6%	1.5%
Cluster17	26-29 Nov 2025	1,172	—	15%	—	30%	14%	27%	6%	6%	2%
Ifop	1-3 Nov 2025	1,037	<1%	12%	13%	20%	14%	26%	8%	7%	—
Ifop	1-3 Nov 2025	1,037	1%	—	19%	22%	15%	28%	8%	7%	—
Ifop	1-3 Nov 2025	1,037	1%	12%	14%	22%	—	35%	9%	7%	—

=== Second round ===

Polling firm	Fieldwork date	Sample size	Chikirou LFI	Grégoire PS	Bournazel HOR	Dati LR	Knafo REC
Elabe	17-19 Mar 2026	1,000	10%	45.5%	—	44.5%	—
Cluster17	17-19 Mar 2026	1,043	11%	48%	—	41%	—
Ifop	17-19 Mar 2026	1,129	10%	46%	—	44%	—
	17 Mar 2026	Knafo withdraws from the second round					
	17 Mar 2026	Dati and Bournazel merge their lists for the second round, Bournazel withdrawing from the merged list					
OpinionWay	5-10 Mar 2026	1,066	14%	33%	12%	30%	11%
OpinionWay	5-10 Mar 2026	1,066	—	46%	14%	40%	—
OpinionWay	5-10 Mar 2026	1,066	15%	40%	—	45%	—
Elabe	27 Feb - 6 Mar 2026	1,000	11,5%	33%	12,5%	30%	13%
Elabe	27 Feb - 6 Mar 2026	1,000	11%	38,5%	—	36,5%	14%
Elabe	27 Feb - 6 Mar 2026	1,000	—	43,5%	13%	30,5%	13%
Elabe	27 Feb - 6 Mar 2026	1,000	—	44,5%	15%	40,5%	—
Elabe	27 Feb - 6 Mar 2026	1,000	—	47,5%	—	37,5%	15%
Elabe	27 Feb - 6 Mar 2026	1,000	13%	40%	—	47%	—
Elabe	27 Feb - 6 Mar 2026	1,000	—	51%	—	49%	—
Ifop	2-5 Mar 2026	1,065	10%	35%	12%	32%	11%
Ifop	2-5 Mar 2026	1,065	11%	39%	—	40%	10%
Ifop	2-5 Mar 2026	1,065	11%	36%	14%	39%	—
Ifop	2-5 Mar 2026	1,065	—	45%	—	41%	14%
Ifop	2-5 Mar 2026	1,065	12%	41%	47%	—	—
Ifop	2-5 Mar 2026	1,065	12%	42%	—	46%	—
Ifop	2-5 Mar 2026	1,065	—	42%	16%	42%	—
Ifop	2-5 Mar 2026	1,065	—	47%	—	53%	—
Cluster17	24-26 Feb 2026	765	13%	35%	10%	30%	12%
Cluster17	24-26 Feb 2026	778	—	45%	12%	43%	—
Cluster17	24-26 Feb 2026	787	—	49%	—	37%	14%
Cluster17	24-26 Feb 2026	836	14%	41%	—	45%	—
Cluster17	24-26 Feb 2026	873	—	50%	—	50%	—
OpinionWay	16-23 Feb 2026	1,073	12%	34%	12%	30%	12%
OpinionWay	16-23 Feb 2026	1,073	—	41%	12%	33%	14%
OpinionWay	16-23 Feb 2026	1,073	12%	34%	14%	40%	—
OpinionWay	16-23 Feb 2026	1,073	—	43%	14%	43%	—
OpinionWay	16-23 Feb 2026	1,073	11%	40%	—	49%	—
Ifop	16-19 Feb 2026	991	11%	33%	11%	32%	13%
Ifop	16-19 Feb 2026	991	11%	36%	—	42%	11%
Ifop	16-19 Feb 2026	991	—	42%	15%	43%	—
Ifop	16-19 Feb 2026	991	11%	40%	—	49%	—
Ifop	16-19 Feb 2026	991	—	47%	—	53%	—
OpinionWay	11-16 Feb 2026	970	14%	32%	15%	26%	13%
OpinionWay	11-16 Feb 2026	970	—	42%	19%	39%	—
OpinionWay	11-16 Feb 2026	970	15%	39%	—	46%	—
Harris	1-3 Feb 2026	1,150	12%	36%	34%	—	18%
Harris	1-3 Feb 2026	1,150	13%	39%	48%	—	—
Harris	1-3 Feb 2026	1,150	—	48%	52%	—	—
Ifop	20-23 Jan 2026	988	12%	38%	—	38%	12%
Ifop	20-23 Jan 2026	988	—	43%	16%	41%	—
Ifop	20-23 Jan 2026	988	14%	41%	—	45%	—
Ifop	20-23 Jan 2026	988	—	50%	—	50%	—
Ifop	5-9 Jan 2026	983	—	40%	20%	40%	—
Ifop	5-9 Jan 2026	983	12%	41%	—	47%	—
Ifop	5-9 Jan 2026	983	—	49%	—	51%	—
Elabe	2-9 Jan 2026	1,014	12%	36%	17%	35%	—
Elabe	2-9 Jan 2026	1,014	11%	42%	—	47%	—
Elabe	2-9 Jan 2026	1,014	—	48%	—	41%	11%
Elabe	2-9 Jan 2026	1,014	—	50%	—	50%	—
	17 Dec 2025	Belliard withdraws in support of Grégoire					
Ifop	1-3 Nov 2025	1,037	15%	34%	15%	36%	—
Ifop	1-3 Nov 2025	1,037	—	42%	19%	39%	—
Ifop	1-3 Nov 2025	1,037	15%	40%	—	45%	—
Ifop	1-3 Nov 2025	1,037	16%	39%	45%	—	—

== Results ==
Candidate	Party	First round		Second round		Seats	
Candidate	Party	Votes	%	Votes	%	Nb.	+/-
Emmanuel Grégoire	PS-LE-PCF-PP-L'A-GRS	309,693	37.98%	428,143	50.52%	103	+7
Rachida Dati	LR-MoDem-UDI-PR	207,613	25.46%	351,825	41.52%	51	−15
Pierre-Yves Bournazel	HOR-RE-LC-Cap21-MEI	92,448	11.34%	351,825	41.52%	51	−15
Sophia Chikirou	LFI-PG-POI	95,551	11.72%	67,464	7.96%	9	+8
Sarah Knafo	REC	84,809	10.40%	Withdrawal		0	0
Thierry Mariani	RN-LDP-UDR-RPR-IDL-L'AF	13,096	1.61%	—		0	0
Blandine Chauvel	NPA-R	5,991	0.73%	—		0	0
Marielle Saulnier	LO	5,544	0.68%	—		0	0
Mahel Pierot-Guimbaud	PT	703	0.09%	—		0	0
Registered voters		1,405,332	58.89	1,404,863	61.60		
Abstention		577,733	41.11	539,497	38.40		
Total votes		827,599	100.00	865,366	100.00		
Blank or invalid votes		12,151	0.86	5,696	0.66		
Valid votes		815,448	98.53	847,432	97.93		

== Arrondissement mayors ==
Arrondissement	Outgoing mayor	Party	Elected mayor	Party	Votes	Of total	Seats
Paris	Anne Hidalgo*	PS	Emmanuel Grégoire	PS		50.52%	103/163
Centre	Ariel Weil	PS	Ariel Weil	PS		50.69%	18/23
5th	Florence Berthout	HOR	Florence Berthout	HOR		52.66%	10/13
6th	Jean-Pierre Lecoq	LR	Jean-Pierre Lecoq	LR		53.66%	8/9
7th	Rachida Dati	LR	Rachida Dati	LR		58.77%	10/11
8th	Jeanne d'Hauteserre	DVD	Catherine Lécuyer	LR		57.11%	7/8
9th	Delphine Bürkli	HOR	Delphine Bürkli	HOR		57.84%	11/14
10th	Alexandra Cordebard	PS	Alexandra Cordebard	PS		48.13%	15/19
11th	François Vauglin*	PS	David Belliard	LE		55.32%	26/33
12th	Emmanuelle Pierre-Marie*	LE	Lucie Castets	DVG		47.51%	25/33
13th	Jérôme Coumet	DVG	Jérôme Coumet	DVG		51.52%	35/43
14th	Carine Petit	LE	Carine Petit	LE		49.64%	25/33
15th	Philippe Goujon	LR	Philippe Goujon	LR		61.14%	45/55
16th	Jérémy Redler	LR	Jérémy Redler	LR		50.62%	30/38
17th	Geoffroy Boulard	LR	Geoffroy Boulard	LR		60.5%	32/39
18th	Éric Lejoindre	PS	Éric Lejoindre	PS		48.82%	32/44
19th	François Dagnaud	PS	François Dagnaud	PS		52.61%	33/43
20th	Éric Pliez	PP	Éric Pliez	PP		53.98%	35/45
*not running for re-election

== See also ==
- 2026 French municipal elections
  - 2026 Lyon municipal election
  - 2026 Marseille municipal election
  - 2026 Nancy municipal election
  - 2026 Nice municipal election
  - 2026 Toulouse municipal election
