= Sarah Knafo =

French politician (born 1993)

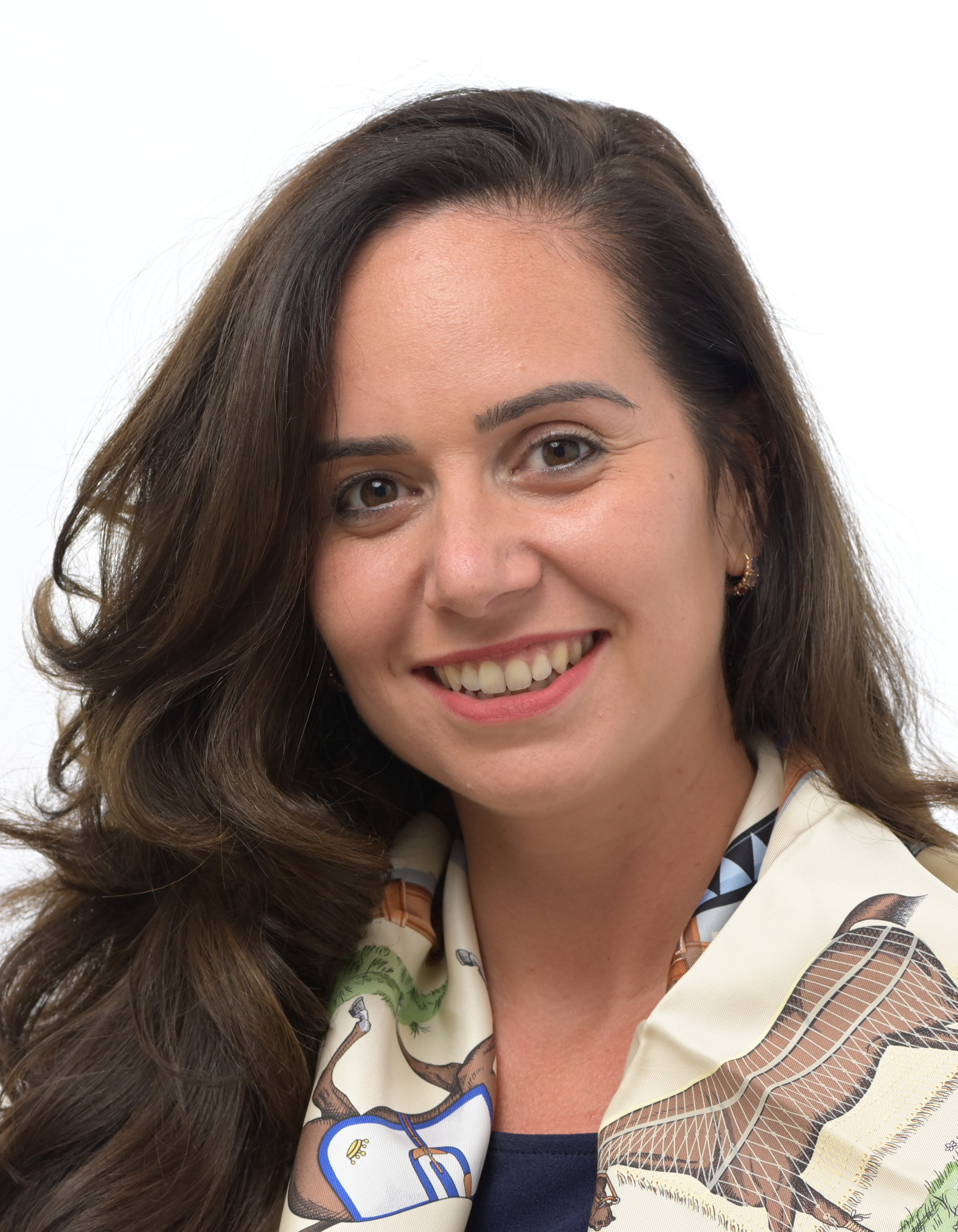
- Official portrait, 2024

Member of the European Parliament
- Incumbent
- Assumed office 16 July 2024
- Constituency: France

Member of the Cour des Comptes
- In office 9 January 2020 – 15 July 2024
- President: Pierre Moscovici

Personal details
- Born: 24 April 1993 (age 33) Les Pavillons-sous-Bois, France
- Party: REC (2021–present)
- Other political affiliations: UMP (2011–2015); LR (2015–2021)
- Domestic partner: Éric Zemmour (2021–present)
- Education: Panthéon-Sorbonne University; Sciences Po; École nationale d'administration
- Occupation: Administrative magistrate • Civil servant

Sarah Knafo (French pronunciation: [saʁa knafo]; born 24 April 1993) is a French administrative magistrate and politician. She was a member of the Cour des Comptes from 2020 to 2024. A member of Reconquête, she was elected a Member of the European Parliament (MEP) in 2024, where she sits with the Europe of Sovereign Nations (ESN) group. She was a candidate in the 2026 Paris municipal election to become mayor of Paris.

== Early life ==
Knafo was born in the Parisian suburb of Les Pavillons-sous-Bois to a family of Sephardic Jews ancestry who had roots in Algeria and Morocco. Her grandparents moved to France in the wake of the Six Day War. Her mother works as a hypnotherapist and her father is a businessman. Knafo moved to Paris as a teenager.

== Education and career ==
Knafo graduated with a degree in public administration from Sciences Po in 2011 and then from Panthéon-Sorbonne University with a degree in economics and political science in 2014. In 2018, she joined the École nationale d'administration (ENA) and graduated in 2020.

During her studies, she worked as an intern at the French embassy in Libya (at the time relocated to Tunisia). During that time, she also conducted research into illegal immigration routes from Africa into Europe. In 2020, she began working as a civil servant in Cour des comptes and later became a magistrate.

Knafo worked as an advisor for Éric Zemmour, a friend of her family, in his campaign for the 2022 French presidential election. In the 2024 European Parliament election in France, she was elected an MEP for Reconquête on the list led by Maréchal. On 3 October 2024, the Paris prosecutor's office closed the complaint for "spreading false news" filed by the Algerian state after, Knafo claimed, Algeria received 800 million euros in development aid per year from France.

Knafo became a Claremont Institute fellow in 2024. On 7 January 2026, she announced her candidacy for mayor of Paris in the municipal election. The list she led for the Council of Paris came fifth in the first round of voting with 10.4% of the vote, just above the 10% threshold required to advance to the second round. However she then withdrew her candidacy and endorsed Republican Rachida Dati in an effort to prevent the list led by Socialist Emmanuel Grégoire from winning the election.

== Personal life ==
Knafo previously had a relationship with Louis Sarkozy, the son of former president Nicolas Sarkozy. In January 2022, Éric Zemmour informed the public that Knafo, who is 34 years younger, is his romantic partner. Regarding her beliefs, Knafo has described herself as Jewish but influenced by Christian culture.
