= Yann Wehrling =

French illustrator and politician

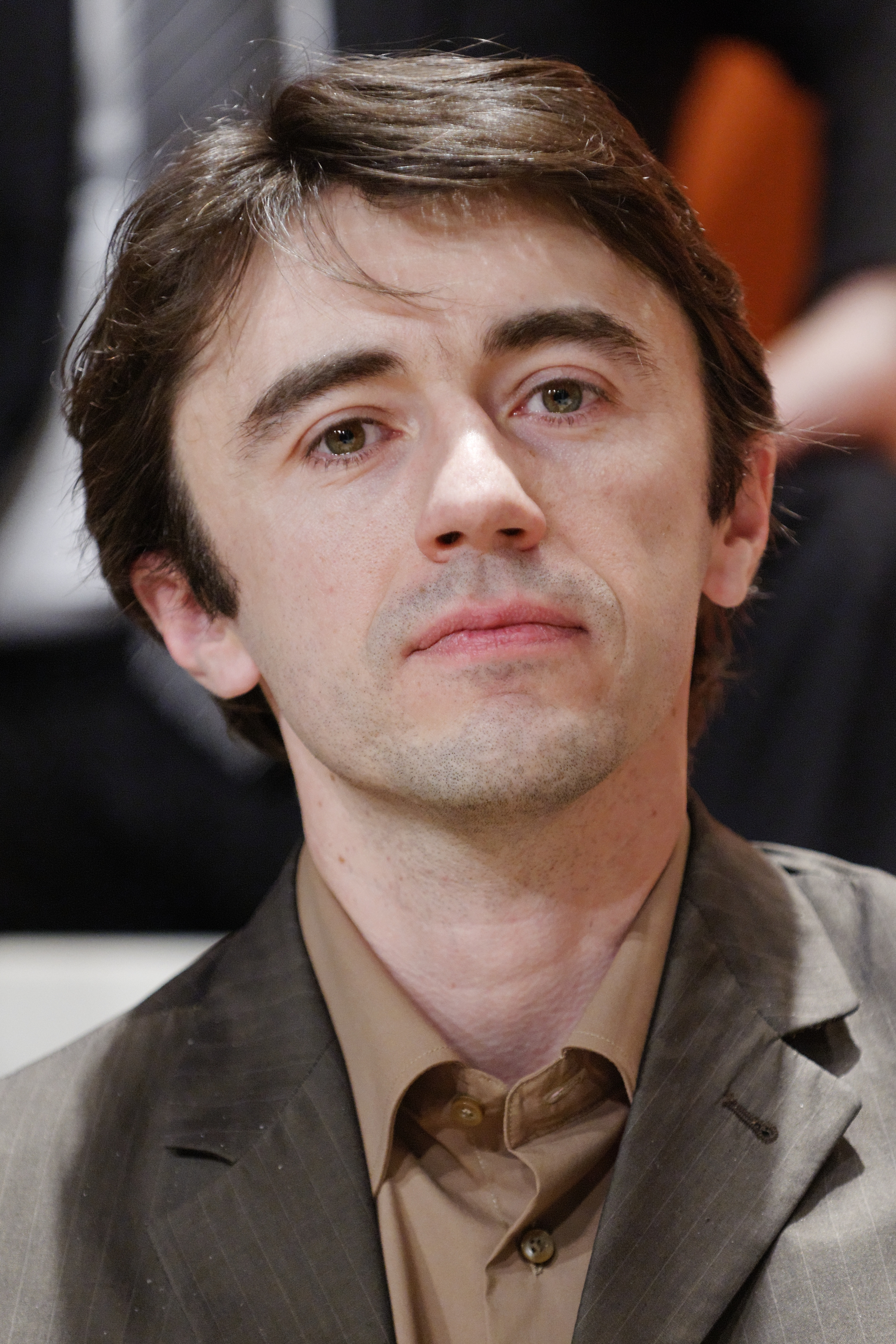
- Yann Wehrling in 2010

Councillor of Paris
- Incumbent
- Assumed office 30 March 2014
- Mayor: Anne Hidalgo

Member of the Regional council of Île-de-France
- Incumbent
- Assumed office 13 December 2015
- President: Valérie Pécresse

National Secretary of The Greens
- In office 25 January 2005 – 16 November 2006
- Preceded by: Gilles Lemaire
- Succeeded by: Cécile Duflot

General Secretary of MoDem
- In office 18 September 2017 – 12 December 2018
- Preceded by: Marc Fesneau
- Succeeded by: Jean-Noël Barrot

Personal details
- Born: 3 July 1971 (age 55) Strasbourg, France
- Party: The Greens; MoDem
- Education: University of Strasbourg

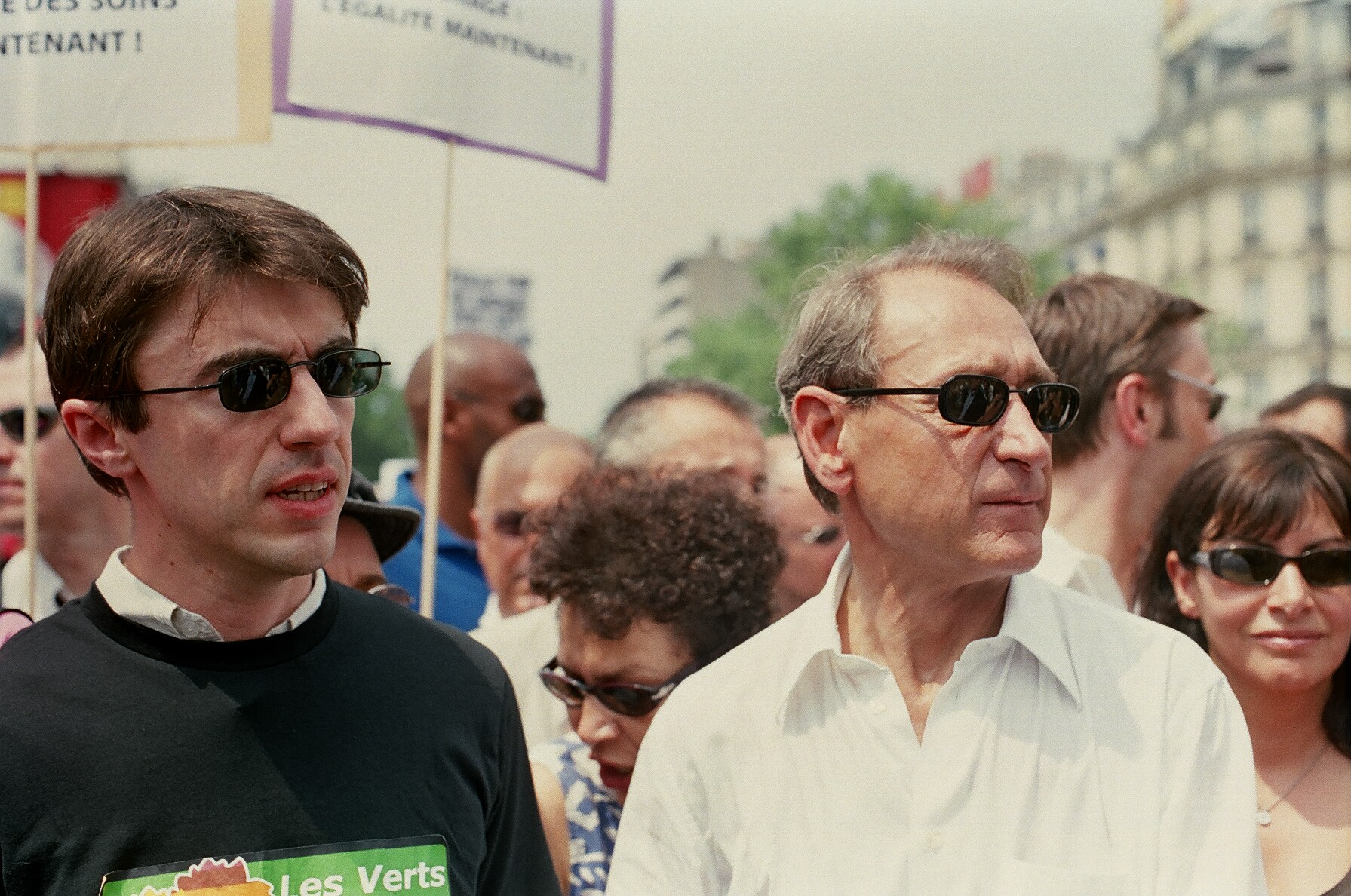
Yann Wehrling and Bertrand Delanoë, at Gay Pride, Paris in France, June 2005

Yann Wehrling (born 3 July 1971) is a French illustrator and politician of the Democratic Movement (MoDem). He previously was a member and former leader of the political party The Greens.

== Education and early activism ==
In 1988 Wehrling joined the environmental movement "France Nature Environnement" and in the following year joined The Greens. From 1992 to 1994 he was the National Secretary of "EcoloJ", a youth environmental organisation. After completing his studies of fine arts in Strasbourg in 1994, he worked as an illustrator in publishing, for the French-German television channel Arte, and for the Irish channel TnaG.

Wehrling is a specialist in wild fauna, and an expert on the reintroduction of the lynx into the Vosges forest.

== Political career ==
=== Green Party ===
Wehrling then became a spokesman for The Greens. In January 2005 he was elected the National Secretary of The Greens with 62% of the vote, coming after long and protracted negotiations. In December 2006 Cécile Duflot succeeded him to the post.

Wehrling belonged to the environmentalist wing of the party, named "Pôle Écolo" (the Eco-Pole) ou "Ecolo" (Eco). He worked with fellow Green politicians in the European Parliament.

=== MoDem ===
Following the 2008 French municipal elections in Strasbourg, Wehrling became a member of François Bayrou's Democratic Movement (MoDem). As a consequence, he was excluded from the Green Party.

Ahead of the 2014 Paris municipal election, Wehrling joined the campaign team of candidate Nathalie Kosciusko-Morizet.

In 2017, Wehrling succeeded Marc Fesneau as secretary general of MoDem, under the leadership of chairman François Bayrou.

In 2018, Wehrling was appointed by Minister of Europe and Foreign Affairs Jean-Yves Le Drian as France's ambassador on the environment.

=== Positive ecology ===
On February 8, 2024, Corinne Lepage and Yann Wehrling announced the launch of the "Positive Ecology & Territories" collective, for the 2024 European elections.

== Media action ==
On 22 March 2005, for the World Day for Water, Werhling took a swim in the Seine river in Paris, along with three other members of the Executive College of the Greens. Their reason behind this action was to denounce pollution in French rivers and to urge the government to reexamine its environmental policy in this regard. French President Jacques Chirac had—in a sense—promised much the same thing in regard to the Seine river during time as mayor of Paris.
