= Cécile Duflot =

French politician (born 1975)

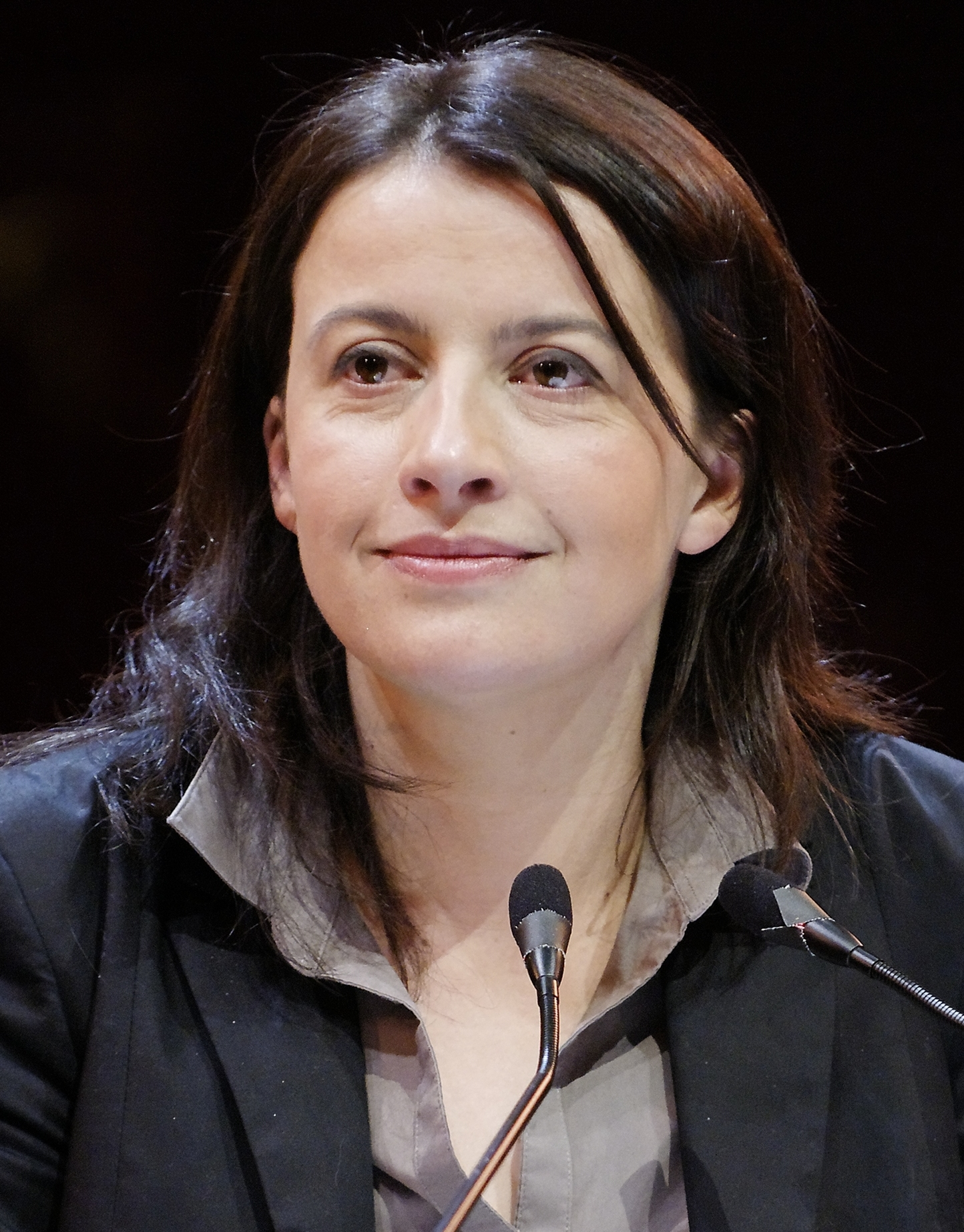

President of Oxfam France
- Incumbent
- Assumed office 15 June 2018

Member of the National Assembly for Paris's 6th constituency
- In office 2012–2017
- Preceded by: Danièle Hoffman-Rispal
- Succeeded by: Pierre Person

Minister of Territorial Equality and Housing
- In office 16 May 2012 – 2 April 2014
- President: François Hollande
- Prime Minister: Jean-Marc Ayrault
- Preceded by: Benoist Apparu
- Succeeded by: Sylvia Pinel

National Secretary of Europe Ecology – The Greens
- In office 16 November 2006 – 30 November 2013
- Preceded by: Yann Wehrling

Personal details
- Born: 1 April 1975 (age 51) Villeneuve-Saint-Georges, France
- Party: Europe Ecology – The Greens
- Children: 4
- Education: Paris Diderot University; ESSEC Business School
- Profession: Town planner Executive director of Oxfam France

Cécile Duflot (French pronunciation: [se.sil dy.flo]; born 1 April 1975) is a French non-governmental organisation (NGO) leader and former politician. She has been a government minister, a member of the National Assembly, and political party leader.

She served as the National Secretary of the green parties (2006-2010) and Europe Ecology – The Greens (2010-2012). Following the victory of François Hollande in the 2012 presidential election, she was appointed Minister of Territorial Equality and Housing (French: Ministre de l'Egalité des Territoires et du Logement) in the Ayrault Cabinet from 2012 to 2014. Until June 2012, she was Party Secretary (i.e. leader) of Europe Ecology – The Greens, a position she held from November 2006; with Jean-Luc Bennahmias, she was the only Green leader to have served two consecutive terms. In May 2012, she announced her resignation from this role.

On 5 April 2018, she announced her departure from politics to lead Oxfam France starting on 15 June. In 2022, she was appointed to the National Consultative Ethics Committee (Comité consultatif national d'éthique) for life sciences and health.

== Personal life ==
Duflot was born in Villeneuve-Saint-Georges, Val-de-Marne, the eldest daughter of a railway unionist and a physics and chemistry teacher (who was herself also a unionist). Duflot spent her childhood and adolescence in the district of Montereau-Fault-Yonne, specifically in the Montereau-Surville district, where she attended the Lycée André-Malraux, before returning to her native town, Villeneuve-Saint-Georges, in the early 1990s. She is a town planner by profession, a graduate of the ESSEC Business School (French Business School), and holds a master's degree in geography.

Her first activist commitments were in the Jeunesse ouvrière chrétienne ("Young Christian Workers") and the Ligue pour la protection des oiseaux ("Birds' Protection League").

A divorcée, Cécile Duflot is the mother of three girls and a boy in a step-family. Also, she shared the life of Jean-Vincent Placé, a French Senator and once Secretary of State.

== Political career ==
After joining The Greens in 2001, she stood in the municipal elections at Villeneuve-Saint-Georges that same year. She became an opposition municipal councillor in the town in June 2004.

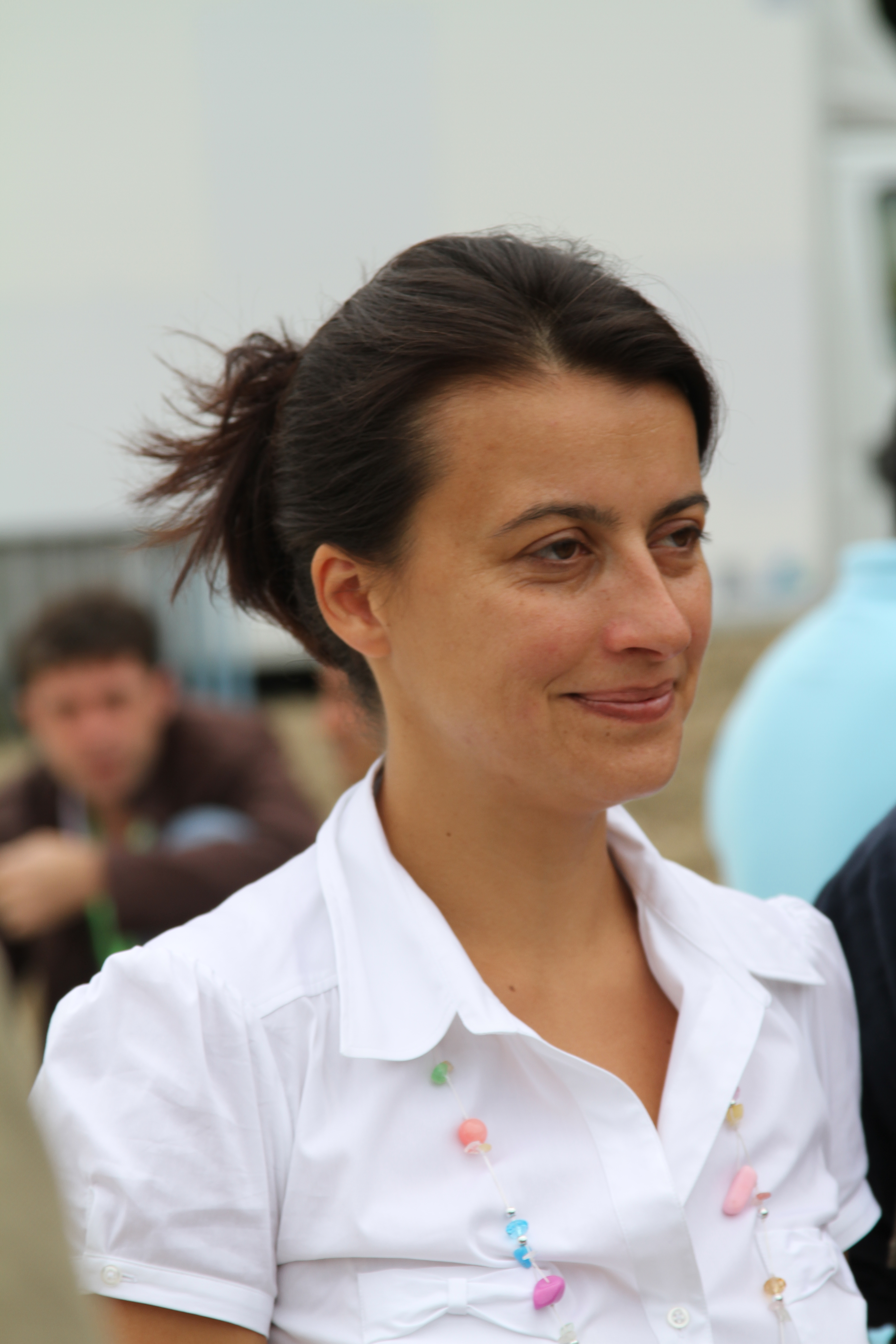
Duflot in 2010

In 2003, she joined the electoral college of the Greens; she organised the acquisition of their national headquarters. She became spokesperson for the party in January 2005. That same year on World Water Day, she swam in the Seine in Paris with three other members of the electoral college to denounce river pollution in France and to match Jacques Chirac's promise, when he was Mayor of Paris, to swim in the Seine.

On 16 November 2006 she was elected National Secretary of the Conseil National Inter Régional, succeeding Yann Wehrling. At the age of 31, she was the youngest-ever National Secretary of the Greens.

At the end of 2006, she stood for the party's primary to nominate its presidential candidate for the 2007 French presidential election. Earning 23.29% of the vote, she came third after Dominique Voynet and Yves Cochet, and did not qualify for the second round.

In the 2007 legislative elections, she was the Green Party candidate in the third district of Val-De-Marne and gained 3.55% of the vote.

In March 2008 during the municipal elections at Villeneuve-St-Georges, she came in second place on a unified ticket of the PS, the MRC, the PRG and the Greens after socialist Laurent Dutheil. The ticket earned 24.36%.

On 6 December 2008, introducing a motion synthesizing four of the six activists' voting slips three weeks earlier, she was re-offered the post of National Secretary of the Greens with 70.99% of the votes. With Jean-Luc Benhamias, she is the only secretary to be offered a second consecutive term, Dominique Plancke having completed three terms of one year.

During her first term, she worked to establish Europe Écologie for the European Elections of 2009. She is not eligible as a candidate for this now, preferring instead to focus on her mandate as National Secretary.

In 2010, she along with Monica Frassoni, Renate Künast, and Marina Silva were named by Foreign Policy magazine to its list of top global thinkers, for taking Green mainstream.

In August 2014, she voiced criticisms of the French government, particularly of President François Hollande, stating that, "...wanting to be a leftist president, he never found his social base nor his supporters. This is not a question of temperament, rather it is the result of a succession of often unexpected choices, which are sometimes inconsistent with each other."

She is a member of the Advisory Panel of DiEM25.

=== As Minister ===
The position of Minister of Housing was offered to her in the Ayrault government of the Hollande presidency, which began in May 2012. One of her tasks was to promulgate a law on social housing. Her first effort, announced 11 September of that year, failed in October, causing embarrassment to the Prime Minister. The loi Duflot replaced the fr:Loi Scellier on 18 January 2013.

The loi Alur (Accès au logement et urbanisme rénové) restricted landlord-tenant relations in exchange for favourable financial treatment. It passed on 20 February 2014.

== After politics ==
In June 2017 she was for the Green Party a candidate for Parliament. She was eliminated in the first round.

Since June 2018 she is the executive director of the NGO Oxfam France, member of the confederation Oxfam International.

She is a member of the board of Paris 1 Pantheon Sorbonne University for 2020-2024.

On 22 April 2022, she was appointed by decree to the National Consultative Ethics Committee for Life Sciences and Health on the proposal of the Defender of Rights

== Main political offices ==
The French political system allows one person to hold multiple political offices. The electoral promise of François Hollande to terminate what is known as Dual mandate has not, as of March 2014, been fulfilled.

- Minister of Territories Equality and Housing : May 2012 – March 2014.
- Deputy for the 6th electoral district of Paris : Since June 2012
- Regional councillor of Île-de-France, and chairwoman of the Europe Ecology – The Greens Group : 2010–2012 (Resignation).
- Deputy-mayor of Villeneuve-Saint-Georges : 2008–2011 (Resignation).
- Municipal councillor of Villeneuve-Saint-Georges : Since 2004. Reelected in 2008.
- National Secretary of Europe Ecology – The Greens : 2006–2012 (Resignation).

== Bibliography ==
- Yves Frémion, History of the Green Revolution, published by Hoebeke, 2007, p. 395 (ISBN 9782842302764)
