= Paris's 6th constituency =

Constituency of the National Assembly of France

6th constituency of Paris
- inline Constituency of the National Assembly of France

- Paris, showing its legislative constituency boundaries from 2012
- Deputy: Sophia Chikirou; LFI
- Department: Paris

6th constituency of Paris
- inline Constituency of the National Assembly of France

- Paris, showing its legislative constituencies between 1988 and 2012
- Member: constituency abolished, 2012
- Department: Paris

Map of Paris constituencies in 1981.

The 6th constituency of Paris (French: Sixième circonscription de Paris) is a French legislative constituency in the department of Paris. Like the other 576 French constituencies, it elects one member of the National Assembly using the two-round system. Its boundaries were heavily redrawn in 1988 and 2012. It was the constituency of Maurice Couve de Murville, who served as Prime Minister of France from 1968 to 1969 under President Charles de Gaulle. In the 2022 legislative election, Sophia Chikirou of La France Insoumise (LFI) was elected.

== Deputies ==
Election	Member	Party
1958	Jacques Féron	CNIP
1962	Bernard Dupérier	UNR
1967	Raymond Bousquet	UDR
1968	Maurice Couve de Murville	UDR
1968	Raymond Bousquet	UDR
1973	Maurice Couve de Murville	UDR
1978	Maurice Couve de Murville	RPR
1981	Maurice Couve de Murville	RPR
1986	Proportional representation - no election by constituency	
1988	Georges Sarre	PS
1988	Jean-Yves Autexier	PS
1993	Georges Sarre	PS
1993	Georges Sarre	MDC
1997	Georges Sarre	MDC
2002	Danièle Hoffman-Rispal	PS
2007	Danièle Hoffman-Rispal	PS
2012	Cécile Duflot	EELV
2012	Danièle Hoffman-Rispal	PS
2014	Cécile Duflot	EELV
2017	Pierre Person	LREM
2022	Sophia Chikirou	LFI
2024	Sophia Chikirou	LFI

== Election results ==
=== 2024 ===
Candidate	Party	Alliance	First round			Second round		
Candidate	Party	Alliance	Votes	%	+/–	Votes	%	+/–
Sophia Chikirou	LFI	NFP	34,329	58.19	+4.45			
Gwënaelle Coulon	RE	ENS	13,230	22.42	-3.20			
Élise Maryse Laplace	RN		4,301	7.29	+3.94			
Jean-Christophe Martin	LR		2,317	3.93	±0.00			
Louis Gundermann	UDI		1,577	2.67	N/A			
Hippolyte Verdier	DVE		1,208	2.05	N/A			
Amélie Jullien	REC		626	1.06	-1.86			
Veronique Brunet	LO		509	0.86	-0.08			
Alain Jean Amouni	DIV		450	0.76	N/A			
Thierry Sessin Caracci	DVG		377	0.64	N/A			
Dima Lecrest	DVG		73	0.12	N/A			
Martial Mutte	DIV		0	0.00	N/A			
Laurence Nicolas	DIV		0	0.00	N/A			
Valid votes			58,997	98.34	-0.16			
Blank votes			642	1.07	-0.02			
Null votes			355	0.59	+0.18			
Turnout			59,994	73.85	+17.45			
Abstentions			21,243	26.15	-17.45			
Registered voters			81,237					
Source: Ministry of the Interior, Le Monde
Result						LFI HOLD		

=== 2022 ===
Legislative Election 2022: Paris's 6th constituency
Party	Candidate	Votes	%	±%
LFI (NUPÉS)	Sophia Chikirou*	24,155	53.74	+17.61
LREM (Ensemble)	Julien Bargeton	11,514	25.62	−13.80
DVE	Laurence Bonzani	2,084	4.64	N/A
LR (UDC)	Jean-Christophe Martin	1,767	3.93	−2.47
RN	Marie Rosette Huynh Thi (Bozzi)	1,507	3.35	+0.47
REC	Victor Meldener	1,314	2.92	N/A
Others	N/A	2,605		
Turnout		45,632	56.40	+0.14
LFI gain from LREM				

Sophia Chikirou won in first round.

=== 2017 ===
2017 legislative election: Paris's 6th constituency
Party	Candidate	Votes	%	±%
LREM	Pierre Person	16,772	39.42	N/A
LFI	Danielle Simonnet	8,013	18.83	N/A
EELV	Cécile Duflot	6,250	14.69	−34.05
DVG	Nawel Oumer	2,595	6.10	N/A
UDI	Hélène Hautval	2,307	5.42	N/A
FN	Guy Deballe	1,224	2.88	−2.06
PCF	Adrien Tiberti	1,110	2.61	−13.68
Others	N/A	4,273		
Turnout		43,133	56.26	−3.04
2nd round result
LREM	Pierre Person	18,309	50.99	N/A
LFI	Danielle Simonnet	17,600	49.01	N/A
Turnout		38,218	49.86	
LREM gain from EELV		Swing		

=== 2012 ===
2012 legislative election: Paris's 6th constituency
Party	Candidate	Votes	%	±%
EELV	Cécile Duflot	21,149	48.74	
UMP	Jack-Yves Bohbot	7,940	18.30	
FG	Danielle Simonnet	7,068	16.29	
FN	François Vial	2,145	4.94	
MoDem	Sylvie Mamy	1,274	2.94	
Others	N/A	3,812		
Turnout		43,388	59.30	
2nd round result
EELV	Cécile Duflot	28,009	72.18	
UMP	Jack-Yves Bohbot	10,797	27.82	
Turnout		38,806	52.97	
EELV gain from PS				

=== 2007 ===
Elections between 1988 and 2007 were based on the 1988 boundaries.

Map of Paris Constituencies, 1988-2007 elections

2007 legislative election: Paris's 6th constituency
Party	Candidate	Votes	%	±%
PS	Danièle Hoffman-Rispal	15,797	39.39	
UMP	Jean-Claude Beaujour	9,769	24.36	
MoDem	Olivier Pages	4,767	11.89	
LV	Fabienne Giboudeaux	2,808	7.00	
Far left	Sylviane Charles	1,795	4.48	
PCF	Amar Bellal	1,790	4.46	
FN	Alexandra Chabot	1,022	2.55	
Others	N/A	2,358		
Turnout		40,551	61.41	
2nd round result
PS	Danièle Hoffman-Rispal	25,770	69.12	
UMP	Jean-Claude Beaujour	11,513	30.88	
Turnout		38,172	57.81	
PS hold				

=== 2002 ===
2002 legislative election: Paris's 6th constituency
Party	Candidate	Votes	%	±%
PS	Danièle Hoffman-Rispal	12,031	31.70	
UMP	Claude-Annick Tissot	7,770	20.48	
PR	Georges Curtet	5,628	14.83	
LV	Alice le Roy	3,206	8.45	
FN	Alexandra Chabot	2,230	5.88	
UDF	Ivan Moneme	2,060	5.43	
PCF	Catherine Gegout	1,372	3.62	
RPF	Dominique Ozenne	1,112	2.93	
LCR	Flavia Verri	867	2.28	
Others	N/A	2,539		
Turnout		38,340	69.29	
2nd round result
PS	Danièle Hoffman-Rispal	21,846	63.30	
UMP	Claude-Annick Tissot	12,668	36.70	
Turnout		35,459	64.11	
PS gain from MRC				

=== 1997 ===
1997 legislative election: Paris's 6th constituency
Party	Candidate	Votes	%	±%
MRC	Georges Sarre	12,648	37.56	
UDF	Arlette Braquy	7,843	23.29	
FN	Max Dantès	3,785	11.24	
PCF	Catherine Gégout	2,954	8.77	
LV	Martine Billard	1,950	5.79	
LO	Philippe Julien	1,063	3.16	
DVD	Michel Charneau	699	2.08	
GE	Jeanne Bongiardino	675	2.00	
Others	N/A	2,061		
Turnout		34,671	60.49	
2nd round result
MRC	Georges Sarre	22,150	61.91	
UDF	Arlette Braquy	13,629	38.09	
Turnout		37,355	65.17	
MRC hold				
