= Pierre Person =

French politician (born 1989)

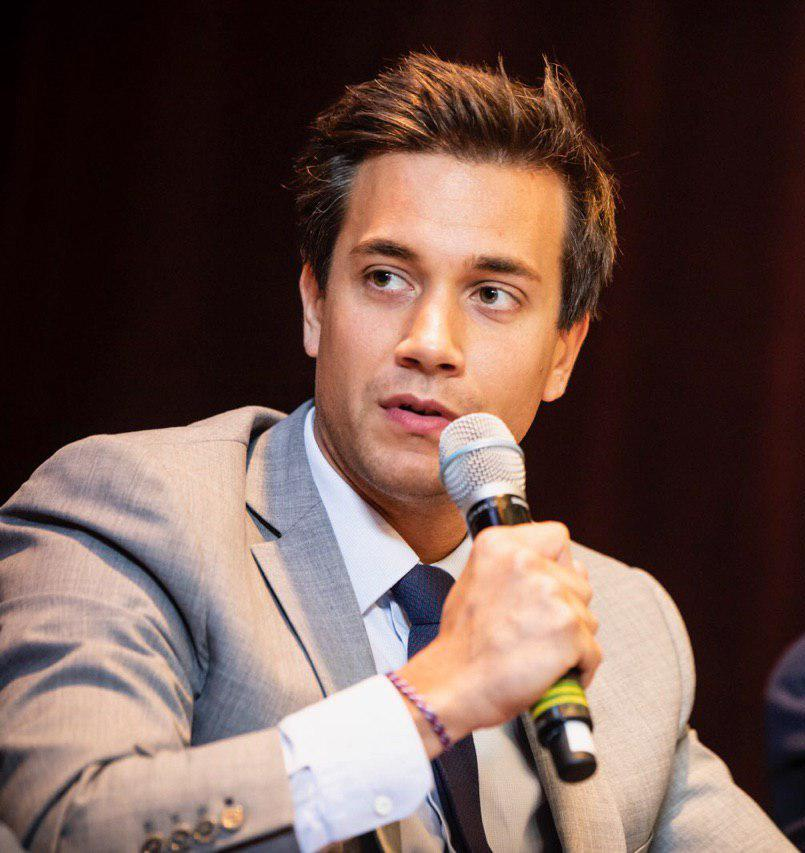
- Person in 2019

Member of the National Assembly for Paris's 6th constituency
- In office 21 June 2017 – 22 June 2022
- Preceded by: Cécile Duflot
- Succeeded by: Sophia Chikirou

Personal details
- Born: 22 January 1989 (age 37) Nancy, France
- Party: Socialist Party (until 2012); La République En Marche! (since 2016)
- Education: University of Poitiers; University of Lorraine; Paris 1 Panthéon-Sorbonne University

Pierre Person (born 22 January 1989) is a French crypto executive and former politician who has served as the chief executive officer (CEO) of Usual Money since 2022.

Previously, he served as the member of the National Assembly for the 6th constituency of Paris from 2017 until 2022. A member of La République En Marche! (LREM), his constituency covers parts of the 11th and 20th arrondissements. Person is considered a close ally to President Emmanuel Macron in Parliament.

== Career ==
=== 2012–2022: Politics ===
During his studies at the University of Poitiers, Person volunteered as the local chairman of the left-wing National Union of Students of France (UNEF). He was also a member of the Socialist Party until 2012. Ahead of the 2012 French presidential election, he worked for the campaign of Socialist candidate Dominique Strauss-Kahn.

In 2015, Person co-founded "Les Jeunes avec Macron" (JAM) with three friends – Sacha Houlié, Florian Humez and Jean Gaborit – which had more than 22,000 members by September 2017. In March 2016, he helped launch “La Gauche Libre” (“The Free Left”), a think-tank advocating “left-wing liberalism” as represented by Emmanuel Macron. He later joined Macron's campaign staff ahead of the 2017 presidential elections.

Person has been a member of the National Assembly since the 2017 elections. In parliament, he first served on the Finance Committee from 2017 until 2018, where he was the rapporteur on the Ministry of Culture's annual budget. Since 2019, he has been a member of both the Committee on Legal Affairs and the Committee on Sustainable Development and Spatial Planning. Person was later appointed as co-rapporteur of a parliamentary mission on crypto assets, which published its conclusions in January 2019.

In November 2018, following the resignation of Christophe Castaner from the position as chairman of LREM, Person briefly considered a candidacy to succeed him but later withdrew from the race for the party leadership; instead, Stanislas Guerini was elected. Person later became Guerini's deputy. In September 2020, he stepped down from that role because of disagreements over the direction of the party; he remained an LREM member.

Person was not seeking re-election in the 2022 French legislative election.

=== 2022–present: Usual Money ===
In 2022, Politico Europe reported that Person had been in talks with potential partners and investors to create a European stablecoin with Carrefour-owned fintech company Market Pay after having been at the forefront of efforts to draft France's cryptocurrency legislation. In the same year, Person co-founded Usual Labs with Adli Takkal Bataille, and Hugo Sallé de Chou. In 2024, Usual Labs launched Usual Money, a decentralized finance (DeFi) protocol built on Ethereum. Usual Money issues two tokens: USD0++, a liquid bond, and US$0, a stablecoin backed by treasury bills.

== Political positions ==
In May 2018, Person co-sponsored an initiative in favour of a bioethics law extending to homosexual and single women free access to fertility treatments, such as in vitro fertilisation (IVF), under France's national health insurance; it was one of the campaign promises of President Emmanuel Macron and marked the first major social reform of his five-year term.

In 2019, Person was one of five members of the LREM parliamentary group who joined a cross-party initiative to legalize the distribution and use of cannabis.

== See also ==
- 2017 French legislative election
