= Sophia Chikirou =

French politician (born 1979)

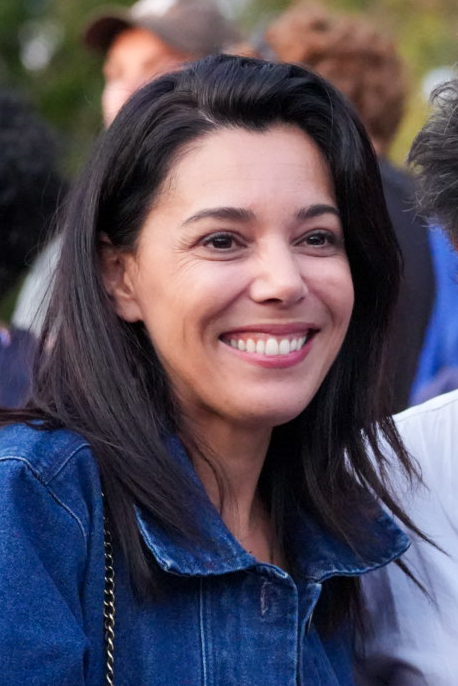
- Chikirou in 2025

Member of the National Assembly for Paris's 6th constituency
- Incumbent
- Assumed office 22 June 2022
- Preceded by: Pierre Person

Councillor of Paris
- Incumbent
- Assumed office 29 March 2026

Member of the Regional Council of Île-de-France
- In office 2 July 2021 – 15 April 2026
- President: Valérie Pécresse
- Constituency: Essonne

Personal details
- Born: 3 June 1979 (age 47) Bonneville, France
- Party: Socialist Party (1997–2006); Modern Left (2007–2008); Left Party (2008–present); La France Insoumise (2016–present)
- Education: Panthéon-Sorbonne University; Grenoble Institute of Political Studies; IAE Paris

Sophia Chikirou (French: [sɔfja ʃikiʁu]; born 3 June 1979) is a French politician who has represented the 6th constituency of Paris in the National Assembly since 22 May 2022.

A member of La France Insoumise (FI), she was elected to Parliament in the first round of the 2022 legislative election. Chikirou has also served as a member of the Regional Council of Île-de-France since 2021. In 2026, she ran for office in the Paris municipal election.

Through her company Mediascop, she served as La France Insoumise communications director during multiple elections. She is both a romantic and political partner to Jean-Luc Mélenchon, who is 28 years her senior.

== Political career ==
A native of Bonneville, Haute-Savoie, Chikirou grew up in Scionzier. She joined the Socialist Party in 1997. From 2002 to 2007, Chikirou worked as a parliamentary assistant for Michel Charzat, who represented the 21st constituency of Paris in the National Assembly. She was excluded from the party in 2006 along with Charzat after they refused to rally behind George Pau-Langevin, the party's nominee for 2007 legislative election in the constituency. Charzat ran for reelection as a Socialist dissident under the miscellaneous left label with Chikirou as his substitute but was defeated.

As a member of La France Insoumise since 2016, she was Jean-Luc Mélenchon's presidential campaign communications director in the 2017 election. In the 2022 legislative election, she was elected to Parliament for the 6th constituency of Paris, where she succeeded one-term incumbent Pierre Person of La République En Marche! who declined to run for reelection.

Sophia Chikirou has been a close associate of Jean-Luc Mélenchon since 2011, serving as his press officer and later as his communications director during the 2012 and 2017 presidential campaigns. She founded the communications agency Mediascop, which managed Mélenchon's media strategy, introducing innovative techniques such as hologram appearances during rallies. Chikirou's influence extended beyond campaign periods, as she remained a key figure in shaping Mélenchon's public image and communication strategies.

She is both a romantic and political partner to Jean-Luc Mélenchon.

Their relationship is considered an open secret. She has been described as more powerful than Mathilde Panot, the leader of the LFI parliamentary group.

The 2025 book La Meute by Charlotte Belaïch and Olivier Pérou examines the internal dynamics of La France Insoumise, highlighting Chikirou's significant influence within the movement. The authors claim that both Mélenchon and Chikirou contributed to an authoritarian atmosphere, drawing parallels to sect-like behaviour. Manuel Bompard described the book as "a collage of gossip and false information".

In 2026, she ran for office in the Paris municipal election. In the second round, Emmanuel Grégoire, who was endorsed by the Communist Party, the Socialist Party, and the Green Party, refused to ally with her. She obtained 11.72% of the votes.
