= Danièle Hoffman-Rispal =

French politician (1951–2020)

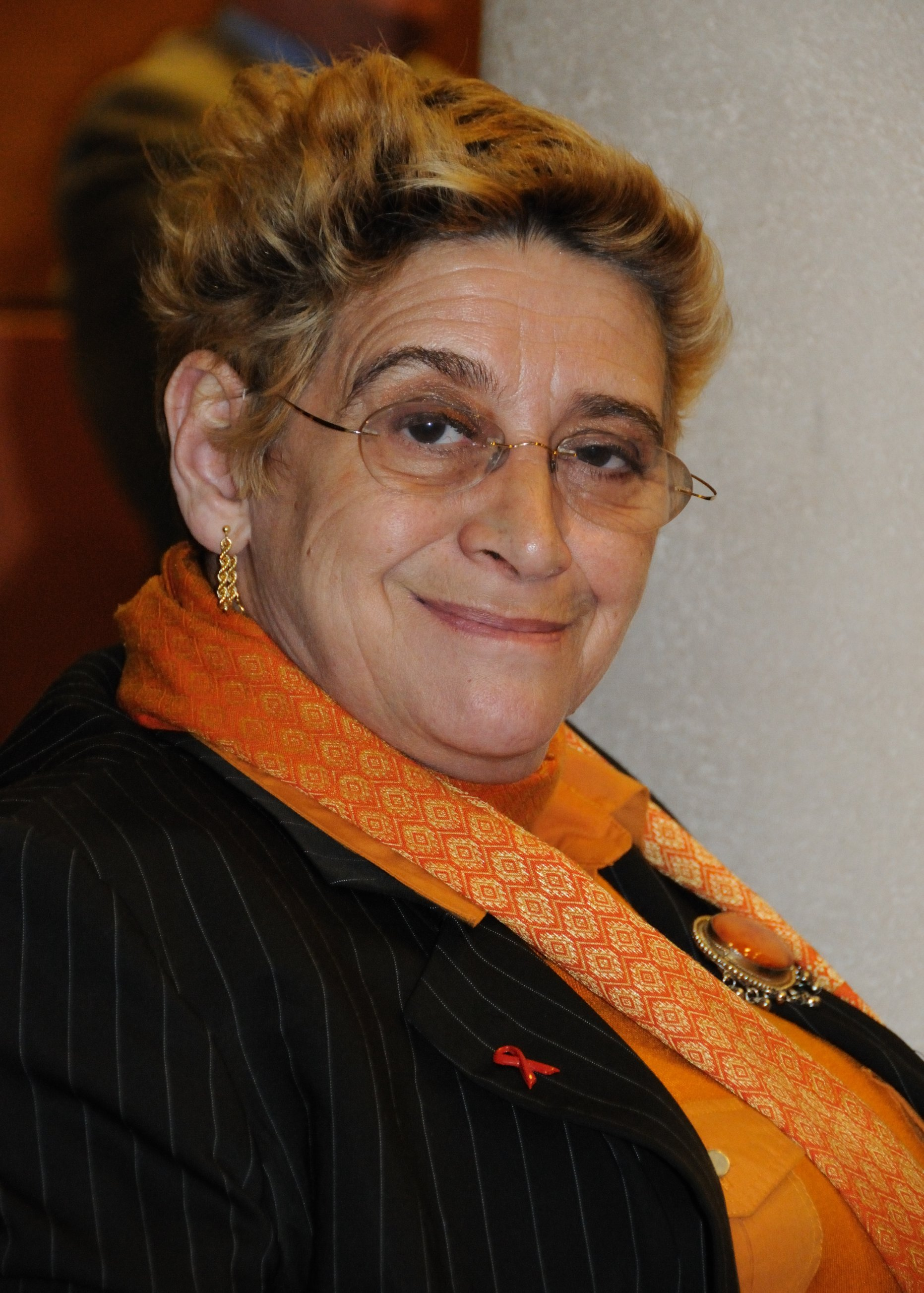

Member of the National Assembly for Paris's 6th constituency
- In office 19 June 2002 – 19 June 2012
- Preceded by: Georges Sarre
- Succeeded by: Cécile Duflot

Councillor of Paris
- In office 25 June 1995 – 16 March 2008
- Mayor: Jean Tiberi; Bertrand Delanoë

Personal details
- Born: 22 June 1951 Paris, France
- Died: 16 April 2020 (aged 68) Paris, France
- Party: Socialist Party

Danièle Hoffman-Rispal (22 June 1951 – 16 April 2020) was a member of the National Assembly of France. She represented the city of Paris, and was a member of the parliamentary group Socialist, Republican, and Citizen Group (SRC). She died on 16 April 2020, aged 68.
