= Georges Sarre =

French politician (1935–2019)

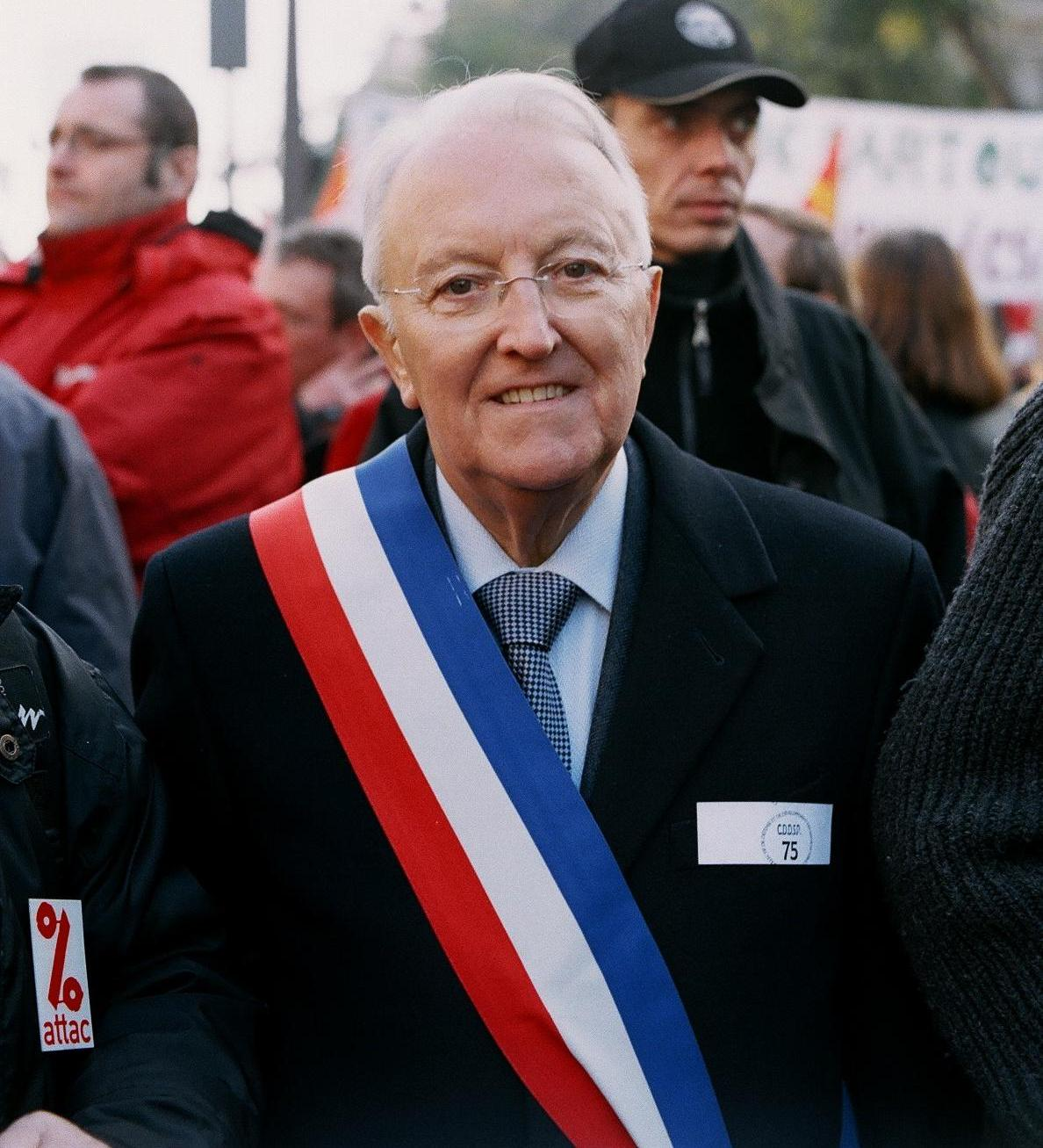
- Georges Sarre in 2005

Mayor of the 11th arrondissement of Paris
- In office 3 July 1995 – 29 March 2008
- Preceded by: Alain Devaquet
- Succeeded by: Patrick Bloche

Member of the National Assembly for Paris's 6th constituency
- In office 2 April 1993 – 18 June 2002
- Preceded by: Jean-Yves Autexier
- Succeeded by: Danièle Hoffman-Rispal

Personal details
- Born: 26 November 1935 Chénérailles, France
- Died: 31 January 2019 (aged 83) Paris, France
- Party: Citizen and Republican Movement

Georges Sarre (26 November 1935 – 31 January 2019) was a French politician and leader of the Citizen and Republican Movement.

Sarre was an early supporter of Jean-Pierre Chevènement and François Mitterrand within the new Socialist Party (PS), which he joined at the famous Epinay Congress in 1971. He was the Socialist top candidate in the 1977 Paris municipal election but lost the election by a handful of votes to Jacques Chirac.

He was elected MEP in the 1979 European elections and was elected to the French National Assembly for Paris in 1981. Between 1988 and 1993 he served as Secretary of State for Road and Fluvial Transportation in the governments led by Michel Rocard, Édith Cresson and Pierre Bérégovoy. He later served, between 1995 and 2008 as the Mayor of the 11th arrondissement of Paris.

In the left's 1993 debacle, he was re-elected in Paris' 6th constituency, the only constituency not won by the right in that election. That same year, disagreeing with the Socialist Party's neo-liberal derive, he joined Jean-Pierre Chevènement in creating the Citizens' Movement (MDC). The MDC became the Republican Pole in 2002 before adopting its current name, Citizen and Republican Movement (MRC). He supported Chevènement's candidacy in the 2002 presidential election and prepared a second Chevènement candidacy in the 2007 presidential election, but Chevènement did not run, instead supporting the Socialist candidate Ségolène Royal by the first round.

He was defeated in his constituency by the Socialist Danièle Hoffman-Rispal in the 2002 French legislative election. However, ahead of the 2007 presidential election and 2007 legislative election in which the MRC supported Royal's candidacy in return for the Socialist Party's endorsement of Sarre's candidacy in the Creuse's 2nd constituency in the June legislative election. Despite the lack of PS opposition, he lost the runoff to UMP incumbent Jean Auclair.

He was often considered the co-leader of the MRC along with Chevènement, although Chevènement is currently the MRC's President.
