= Bureau central de tarification =

Central Tariff Bureau
- Formation: Law No. 58-208 of February 27, 1958
- Type: French independent administrative authority
- Director: Laurent Leveneur
- Website: Bureau central de tarification

Central Tariff Bureau (French: Bureau central de tarification; BCT) is an independent French administrative authority. The BCT is responsible for regulating the premiums for the compulsory insurance, enabling individuals and companies who are unable to pay otherwise due to a certain conditions. It has been authorized to take measures regarding automobile liability insurance since 1958, construction insurance since 1978, natural disaster insurance since 1982, and medical liability insurance since 2002. The last extension of its powers was in 2015, adding a fifth area of competence in rental liability insurance.

== History ==
BCT was created around automobile insurance in 1958. It was established by the Law No. 58-208 of February 27, 1958, instituting a compulsory insurance obligation for motor vehicle traffic.

The Central Construction Tariff Bureau (CCTB) was created by the Spinetta Law of 1978.

The Central Tariff Bureau for Natural Disasters (CTB Cat' Nat') was created in 1982.

The Medical Central Tariff Bureau (MCTB) was created by Law No. 2002-303 of March 4, 2002, relating to patient rights and the quality of the healthcare system (Official Journal of March 5, 2003), specifically Article L.252-1 of the Insurance Code.

The CTB for rental liability, co-owners, and condominium associations was created by Decree No. 2015-518 of May 11, 2015, extending it to rental liability, that of co-owners, and condominium associations. This extension follows the establishment of a new insurance obligation by the ALUR Law of 2014.

== Operations ==
The composition of the CTB is determined by Article R.250-1 of the Insurance Code, an article modified by the 2015 decree.

Its President is Professor Laurent Leveneur. He is chosen from among Council of State counselors, Court of Cassation counselors, Court of Auditors master counselors, or professors of legal disciplines at universities, whether active or emeritus.

Each branch is represented equally by representatives of those subject to the insurance obligation and insurers, who are appointed for a renewable period of three years.

A government commissioner, appointed by the Minister of Finance, attends all debates.

== Sources ==
- Acedo, Sébastien (2015). "Réglementation: le Bureau central de tarification retrouve une stabilité". L'Argus de l'assurance (in French) (11 June).
