= Rachida Dati =

French politician (born 1965)

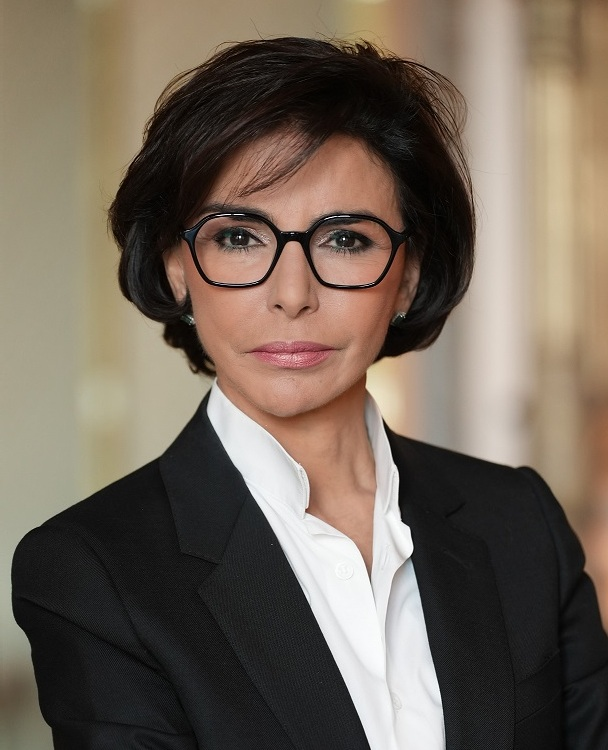
- Official portrait, 2024

Minister of Culture
- In office 11 January 2024 – 25 February 2026
- Prime Minister: Gabriel Attal; Michel Barnier; François Bayrou; Sébastien Lecornu
- Preceded by: Rima Abdul Malak
- Succeeded by: Catherine Pégard

Minister of Justice
- In office 18 May 2007 – 23 June 2009
- Prime Minister: François Fillon
- Preceded by: Pascal Clément
- Succeeded by: Michèle Alliot-Marie

Mayor of the 7th arrondissement of Paris
- Incumbent
- Assumed office 29 March 2008
- Preceded by: Michel Dumont

Councillor of Paris
- Incumbent
- Assumed office 21 March 2008
- Constituency: 7th arrondissement

Member of the European Parliament
- In office 14 July 2009 – 1 July 2019
- Constituency: Île-de-France

Personal details
- Born: 27 November 1965 (age 60) Saint-Rémy, France
- Citizenship: France • Morocco
- Party: LR (2015–2024; since 2025)
- Other political affiliations: UMP (2006–2015); Independent (2024–2025)
- Spouse: Unknown (m. 1992; ann. 1995)
- Children: 1
- Education: University of Burgundy (MAEs); Panthéon-Assas University (LLB)
- Occupation: Lawyer • Magistrate • Politician

Rachida Dati (French: [ʁaʃida dati]; born 27 November 1965) is a French politician, lawyer and magistrate who served as Minister of Culture from 2024 to 2026 in the government of Gabriel Attal, government of Michel Barnier, government of François Bayrou and the first and second governments of Sébastien Lecornu. She previously was Minister of Justice from 2007 to 2009 under Prime Minister François Fillon.

A member of The Republicans (LR), Dati was a Member of the European Parliament (MEP) from 2009 to 2019, representing Île-de-France. She was a spokesperson for Nicolas Sarkozy during his 2007 presidential campaign; following his victory, he appointed her to the Government.

Dati was elected to the mayorship of the 7th arrondissement of Paris in 2008, when she also entered the Council of Paris. In the 2020 Paris municipal election, she unsuccessfully ran for Mayor of Paris against incumbent Anne Hidalgo. Following the election, she was installed as opposition leader in the Council of Paris. She again ran in 2026, placing second to socialist Emmanuel Grégoire.

== Early life and education ==
Rachida Dati (Arabic: رشيدة داتي) was born on 27 November 1965 in Saint-Rémy, Burgundy, to a Moroccan father, a bricklayer named M'Barek Dati (1934–2017), and an Algerian mother, named Fatima-Zohra (died in 2001). Her parents immigrated to France in 1963. She was the second child of eleven in an impoverished family (eight girls and three boys). She spent her childhood in Chalon-sur-Saône.

Even though Dati was raised in a Islamic environment, she attended Roman Catholic schools; Dati's own personal religious beliefs have been described as "unclear". When asked about her North African origins, she stated she saw herself first and foremost as a "daughter of France". Dati studied at the University of Burgundy in Dijon, where she received a master's degree in economics, as well as at Panthéon-Assas University in Paris, where she later received a law degree.

== Early career ==
At the age of sixteen, Dati started working as a maid and as a paramedical assistant. She then worked for three years as an accountant at Elf Aquitaine while at university.

Rachida Dati tried to study medicine, but failed twice in her first year. In October 1985, she completed a DEUG in economics at the University of Dijon.

After meeting Jean-Luc Lagardère in 1990, Dati entered the audit management team of Matra Nortel communication. She later spent a year in London at the European Bank for Reconstruction and Development, in the records management and archiving department. In 1994, she was an auditing supervisor and secretary-general of the bureau of urban development studies at Suez (then Lyonnaise des Eaux). From 1995 to 1997, she worked as a technical advisor at the legal management division of the Ministry of Education.

In 1997, following the advice of Simone Veil and Albin Chalandon, Dati was admitted to and joined the École nationale de la magistrature (French National School for the Judiciary), a public educational institution which offers courses necessary to become a magistrate. Upon leaving in 1999, she became a legal auditor at the Bobigny tribunal de grande instance (high court). She went on to become a judge for collective procedures at the tribunal de grande instance in Péronne and eventually an assistant in the financial section to the prosecutor of the Évry tribunal de grande instance.

== Career in politics ==
In 2002, Dati became Nicolas Sarkozy's advisor, working for him on an anti-delinquency project. In 2006, she joined the Union for a Popular Movement (UMP) party. On 14 January 2007, she was named spokesperson for Sarkozy on the day he was chosen as UMP candidate for the presidential elections of April 2007.

=== Minister of Justice, 2007–2009 ===
After Sarkozy's victory on 6 May 2007, she was appointed Minister of Justice, making her the first political figure born to North African immigrant parents to occupy a sovereign ministry in a French government. Her rationalization of the court system was publicly opposed by judicial professionals. Later on, it was recognised by the French Court of Auditors as one of the most ambitious reforms of the judicial institution. When the Sarkozys' marriage began to break up, Dati frequently went on official presidential trips to accompany Nicolas Sarkozy.

On 23 January 2009, Sarkozy announced that Dati would take the second position on the UMP candidate list for the Île-de-France constituency in the European Parliament election in June 2009, to which she was elected. She left her post as minister after being elected as a Member of the European Parliament.

Soon after she left the government, in the summer of 2009, Dati switched to law, becoming a junior magistrate and assistant prosecutor. She also founded a consulting company called "La Bourdonnais consultant," which she had to dissolve at the beginning of 2010 to be able to resume the profession of lawyer, which she had to do by special dispensation (like other former magistrates). She sits on the editorial board of the French version of the Huffington Post, where she writes a weekly column about women's issues.

=== Member of the European Parliament, 2009–2019 ===
A member of the European People's Party group in the European Parliament, Dati served on the Committee on Civil Liberties, Justice and Home Affairs and the parliament's delegations for relations with the Mashreq countries, to the Parliamentary Assembly of the Union for the Mediterranean, and for relations with the Arab Peninsula.

In parliament, Dati was the Parliament's rapporteur on several texts dealing with countering terrorism and the prevention of radicalisation and recruitment of European citizens by terrorist organisations. Following the Charlie Hebdo shooting in 2015, she drafted a report into how to prevent the radicalisation of young Europeans. The final report was adopted on 25 November 2015 with broad support from the parliament after having passed The Civil Liberties Committee approved the non-binding resolution by 41 votes to 7, with 6 abstentions. Her parliamentary work also included dealing with the prison systems and conditions in the European Union, and finding solutions to face the migration crisis with an EU common list of safe countries of origin.

In the UMP's 2012 leadership election, Dati endorsed Jean-François Copé.

In the Republicans’ 2017 leadership election, Dati endorsed Laurent Wauquiez.

=== Career in local politics ===
On the local level, Dati has been serving as Mayor of the 7th district of Paris and a member of the Council of Paris. On 9 February 2013, Dati announced she was a candidate for mayor of Paris in the 2014 local elections but she later withdrew because "the press has already chosen Nathalie Kosciusko-Morizet".

In early 2019, Dati announced her plan to run again for the Paris municipal election in 2020. Since 2020, she has been chairing her party's group in the Council of Paris.

Dati was a candidate for the 2026 Paris mayoral election, running on the programme "Change Paris" focused on security, cleanliness, and budgetary responsibility. She was endorsed by the conservative Republican party.

=== Minister of Culture, 2024–2026 ===
On 11 January 2024, Dati made a surprise comeback to national politics, being nominated as Minister of Culture in the government of Gabriel Attal. As a consequence, Les Républicains President Éric Ciotti announced her exclusion from the party.

She retained her position on 21 September 2024 in the government of Michel Barnier, and then on 23 December in the government of François Bayrou. She again retained her position in the first and second governments of Sébastien Lecornu.

On 19 October 2025, the 2025 Louvre robbery happened, with Dati testifying in the investigation.

She resigned on 25 February 2026 in order to run in the 2026 Paris municipal election, succeeded by Catherine Pégard, losing the 22 March mayoral race to the Socialist candidate Emmanuel Grégoire.

== Controversy ==
In early 2009, Dati received an anonymous death threat accompanied by a 9 mm bullet.

Soon after Dati left the government in 2009 to stand for the European Parliament, she was hired by the Renault–Nissan–Mitsubishi Alliance as a legal advisor. In 2019, France's financial prosecutor launched an investigation into consulting fees she received from the alliance.

In December 2013, French media reported that Dati had received payments from French energy utility GDF-Suez. In early 2014, the President of the European Parliament Martin Schulz asked parliamentary services to look into conflict-of-interest concerns, but the inquiry was interrupted by the 2014 election campaign. At the same time, the independent French administrative authority HATVP, France's anti-corruption watchdog, also opened a file on the case. In August 2021, Dati was charged by France's financial crime unit with passive corruption and benefiting from abuse of power. On 27 September 2021, Arte reported how caviar diplomacy led to the rejection of a report on Azerbaijani political prisoners by the European Parliament in 2013. The claim was made that the rejection was due to bribery of EU parliamentarians; Dati stood out as one of the leading voices to reject the report about the state of democracy in Azerbaijan. Her Italian colleague Luca Volontè was sentenced for accepting bribes. Volontè received €2.4 million as bribes from a 30 million-euro bribe fund of the Azerbaijani fund to thwart EU guidelines by bribing its institutions.

== Tayeb Benabderrahmane case ==
In 2020, Franco-Algerian lobbyist Tayeb Benabderrahmane claimed he had been arbitrarily detained and tortured in Qatar, in a context linked to his possession of compromising documents concerning Nasser al-Khelaïfi, president of Paris Saint-Germain. After returning to France, he filed a complaint, leading to the opening of a judicial investigation in Paris for kidnapping, unlawful detention, and extortion in an organized group.

On 27 June 2023, the offices of Dati – at the 7th arrondissement town hall and in her law practice – were searched, as were those of lawyers Francis Szpiner and Olivier Pardo, in connection with the investigation.

The judges examined the alleged role of Dati and Szpiner, then mayor of the 16th arrondissement, in negotiations surrounding the release of Tayeb Benabderrahmane, with the French National Financial Prosecutor's Office suspecting talks conducted outside the official procedure.

As of 2026, no formal indictment had been announced, but Dati continued to be cited in the affair, which remains under investigation by the French judiciary. At the same time, in the summer of 2025, the United Nations Working Group on Arbitrary Detention recognized the arbitrary nature of Benabderrahmane's detention in Qatar and called on the Qatari authorities to conduct an investigation and provide reparation for the harm suffered.

== Personal life ==
In November 1992, Rachida Dati married a family friend from Algeria, "with whom she had nothing to share", in her words, to put an end to the "recurring pressures" from her family, what she describes as a "forced marriage". The following month, she requested the annulment of this union, which was pronounced in 1995.

In September 2008, Dati announced that she was pregnant and would be a single mother. She revealed her pregnancy to a group of reporters who questioned her about mounting rumours. "I want to remain careful, because (...) I am still in a risk area. I am 42", she was quoted as saying. Her daughter was born in January 2009. As the name of the father was not revealed, many names circulated in gossip magazines. Before her daughter was born, she suffered several miscarriages.

However, in 2012, she started legal action against Dominique Desseigne, the chief executive of Groupe Lucien Barrière, a casino market leader in France, Switzerland and Europe, in order to establish the paternity of her child. In December 2012, a French court ordered Desseigne to undergo a paternity test to see if he fathered Dati's child. After Desseigne refused to undergo the test, a French court decision of 7 January 2016 ruled that Desseigne was indeed the father.

In November 2016, she was listed as one of BBC's 100 Women, having "blazed a trail for Muslim women and minorities in France".

=== Religion ===
Dati was born to Muslim parents. However, she attends Roman Catholic mass every Sunday.

== Distinctions ==
- Morocco: Grand Officer of the Order of Ouissam Alaouite (April 2010)
- (Kingdom of the Two Sicilies) Two Sicilian Royal Family: Knight Grand Cross of the Royal Order of Francis I
- France: Commander of the Ordre des Arts et des Lettres (January 2024)

Political offices
Preceded by Pascal Clément	Minister of Justice; 2007–2009	Succeeded by Michèle Alliot-Marie
Preceded by Rima Abdul Malak	Minister of Culture; 2024–2026	Vacant
Party political offices
Preceded by Nathalie Kosciusko-Morizet	The Republicans nominee for Mayor of Paris; 2020 (lost)	Most recent
