= Jérémy Redler =

French politician (born 1981)

Mayor of the 16th arrondissement of Paris
- Incumbent
- Assumed office 7 November 2023
- Preceded by: Francis Szpiner

Personal details
- Born: 7 November 1981 (age 44)
- Party: The Republicans

Jérémy Redler (born 7 November 1981) is a French politician of The Republicans. Since 2023, he has served as mayor of the 16th arrondissement of Paris. From 2020 to 2023, he served as first deputy mayor of the arrondissement. He is a member of the Regional Council of Île-de-France, and serves as special delegate for major international events and trade shows.
