= Emmanuel Grégoire =

French politician (born 1977)

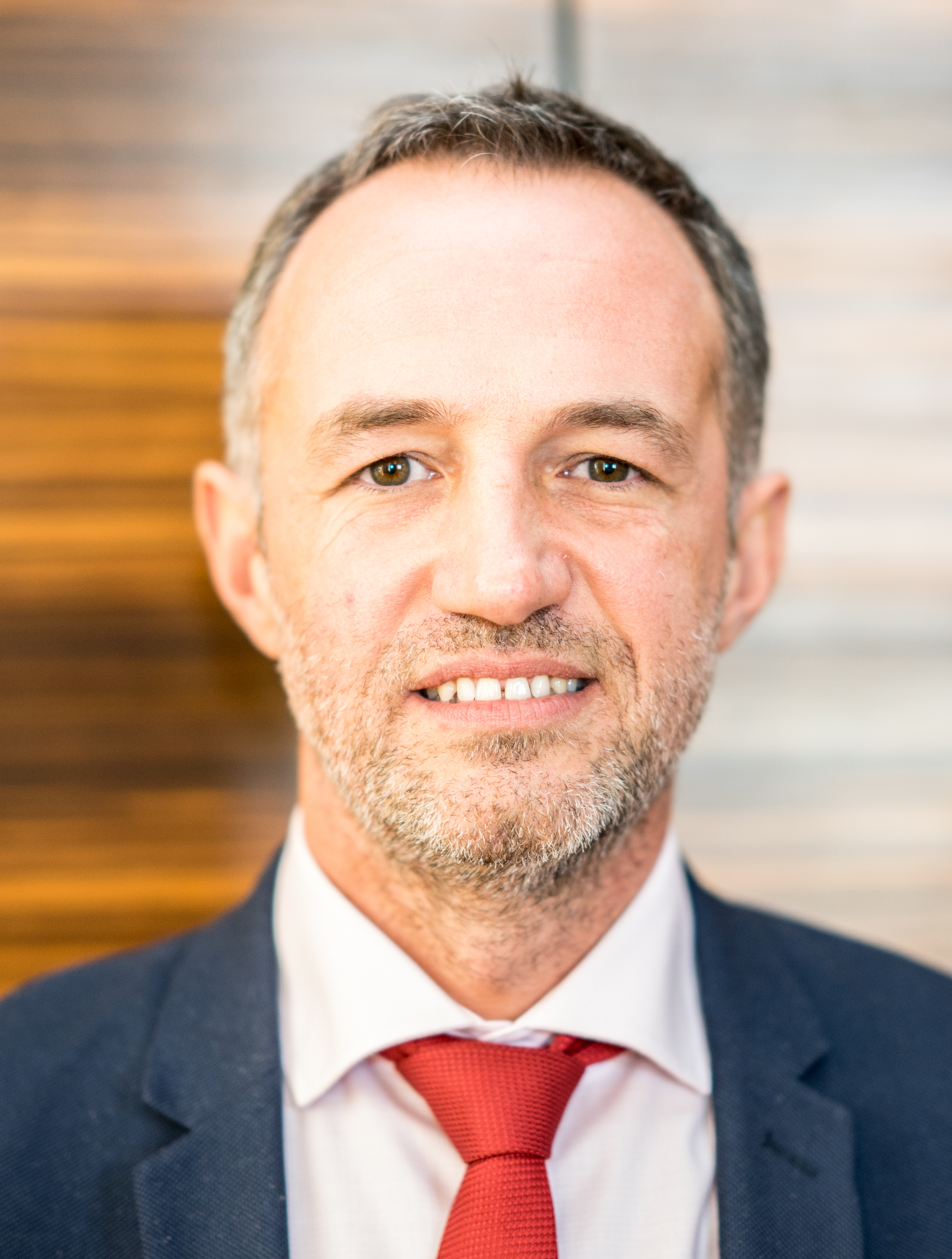
- Grégoire in 2018

Mayor of Paris
- Incumbent
- Assumed office 29 March 2026
- Deputy: Lamia El Aaraje
- Preceded by: Anne Hidalgo

Member of the National Assembly for Paris's 7th constituency
- In office 1 July 2024 – 9 April 2026
- Preceded by: Clément Beaune
- Succeeded by: Dorine Bregman

First Deputy Mayor of Paris
- In office 24 September 2018 – 8 July 2024
- Mayor: Anne Hidalgo
- Preceded by: Bruno Julliard
- Succeeded by: Patrick Bloche

Councillor of Paris
- Incumbent
- Assumed office 30 March 2014
- Constituency: 12th arrondissement

Personal details
- Born: 24 December 1977 (age 48) Les Lilas, France
- Party: Socialist Party
- Education: Institut d'études politiques de Bordeaux

Emmanuel Grégoire (French pronunciation: [emanɥɛl ɡʁeɡwaʁ]; born 24 December 1977) is a French politician who has served as mayor of Paris since 2026. A member of the Socialist Party (PS), he won the 2026 Paris municipal election with 50.5% of the second-round vote against Rachida Dati and Sophia Chikirou. He represented the 7th constituency of Paris in the National Assembly from 2024 to 2026 and served as first deputy mayor of Paris under Anne Hidalgo from 2018 to 2024.

== Life and education ==
Grégoire was born on 24 December 1977 in Les Lilas, Seine-Saint-Denis, France. His father, Pierre Grégoire, was an active member of the French Communist Party. After his parents' divorce, he moved to Charente-Maritime and attended secondary school in Jonzac. He has said he suffered sexual abuse as a schoolboy. He later attended the Institut d'études politiques de Bordeaux and obtained a licence de philosophie (BA).

Despite his communist family, Grégoire turned to social democracy and joined the PS in 2002, supporting Lionel Jospin in the 2002 French presidential election. In 2015, he was appointed to the Ordre national du Mérite.

== Political career ==
Grégoire was active in the 12th arrondissement of Paris and the ranks of the PS, working in politics and party campaigns. In 2010, he became chief of staff to Paris mayor Bertrand Delanoë, serving until 2012. After François Hollande won the 2012 French presidential election, he joined his staff and worked for Prime Minister Jean-Marc Ayrault, first as deputy chief of staff, then as chief of staff until April 2014. He also worked in the private sector during his time as a political staffer.

After Ayrault resigned, Grégoire returned to Paris City Hall. Elected in the 12th arrondissement during the 2014 Paris municipal election, he became deputy mayor to the newly elected PS mayor of Paris Anne Hidalgo, responsible for human resources, public services, and administrative modernization from 2014 to 2017 and for the budget and the transformation of public policies from 2017 to 2018. In September 2018, he succeeded Bruno Julliard as Hidalgo's first deputy mayor. He then left his position as first secretary of the Socialist Federation of Paris, to which he had been elected in 2015.

With Catherine Baratti-Elbaz deciding not to run for reelection as mayor of the 12th arrondissement, Grégoire was selected as the lead candidate. He has lived there for over 20 years. In the 2020 Paris municipal election, his list merged with the The Ecologists list in the second round and won the arrondissement, but the seat of mayor of the 12th arrondissement was given to The Ecologists' Emmanuelle Pierre-Marie in a political agreement, with Grégoire remaining first deputy mayor of Paris, in charge of urban planning. His relationship with Hidalgo deteriorated after her defeat in the 2022 French presidential election as the PS candidate.

In 2024, Grégoire joined national politics and was elected to the National Assembly as the MP for Paris's 7th constituency. He relinquished his position as first deputy mayor of Paris to Patrick Bloche in accordance with the rules against holding multiple elected offices, while Lamia El Aaraje succeeded him as deputy mayor for urban planning.

=== Mayor of Paris ===
Hidalgo announced on 26 November 2024 that she would not seek a third term as mayor and endorsed Senator Rémi Féraud, president of the Socialist group on the Paris Council, as her preferred successor. Grégoire entered the race for the party’s nomination in November 2025, with Hidalgo publicly saying "the left would lose" if he were nominated. Grégoire later said: "She did everything she could to torpedo my candidacy. I’m not her candidate and I am not her heir." Former Paris mayor Bertrand Delanoë backed Grégoire.

During his campaign, Grégoire advocated lower housing costs, increased adaptation of the city to climate change, and redevelopment of the banks of the Seine. On 30 June 2025, Grégoire secured the nomination in the first round of voting, with 52.61% of the vote. He later received the backing of The Ecologists, the French Communist Party, Place Publique, and other smaller left-wing parties. During the campaign, he also refused to merge his list with the list led by Sophia Chikirou of La France Insoumise. Grégoire received the most votes in the first round, with 37.98% to Rachida Dati's 25.46%. A week later, Grégoire's list won the second round, defeating Dati and Chikirou.

Political offices
Preceded by Anne Hidalgo	Mayor of Paris; 2026–present	Incumbent
