= Emmanuelle Pierre-Marie =

French politician (born 1971)

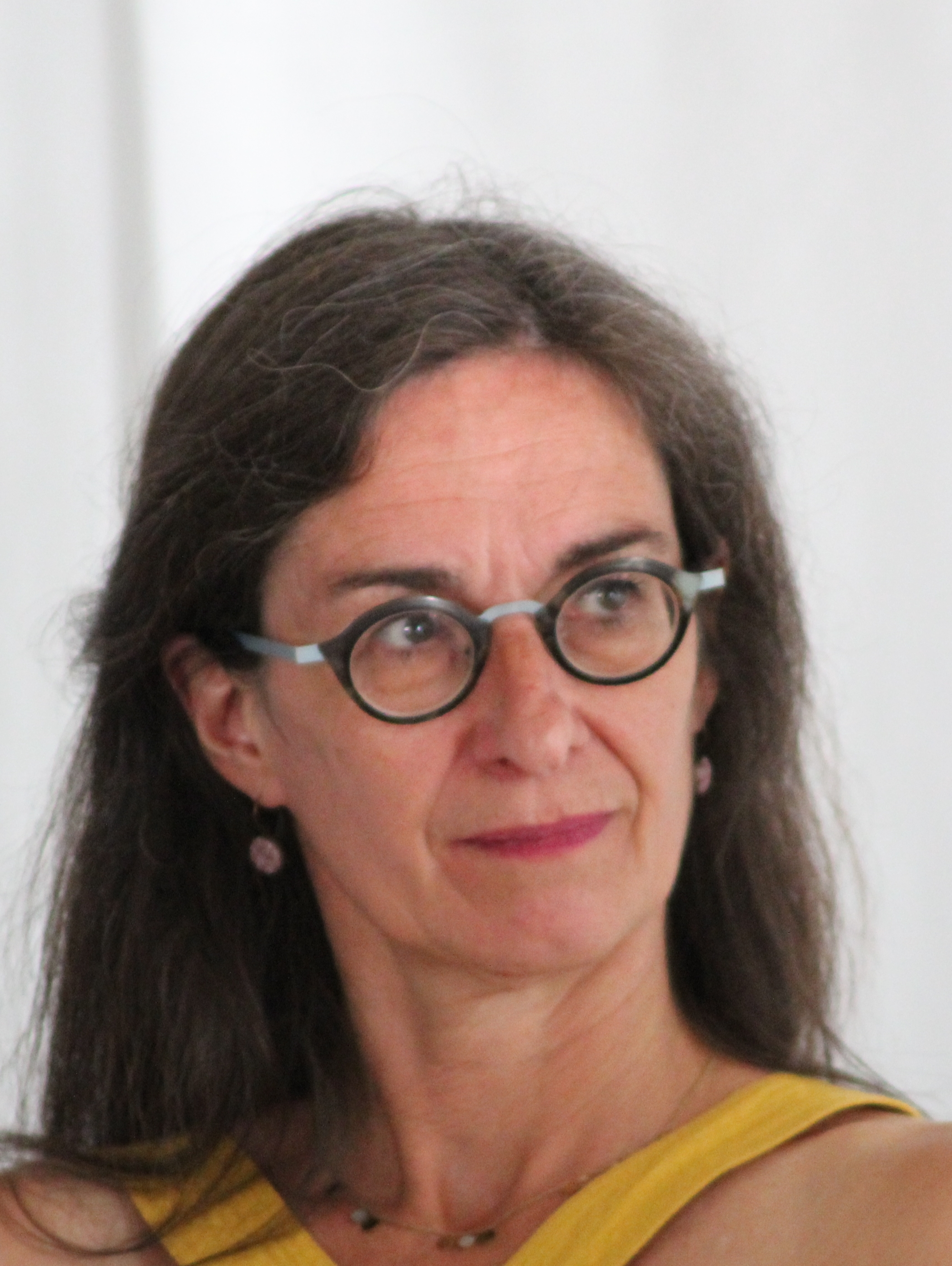
- Pierre-Marie in 2021

Mayor of the 12th arrondissement of Paris
- In office 11 July 2020 – 6 April 2026
- Preceded by: Catherine Baratti-Elbaz
- Succeeded by: Lucie Castets

Personal details
- Born: 11 January 1971 (age 55)
- Party: The Ecologists

Emmanuelle Pierre-Marie (born 11 January 1971) is a French politician of The Ecologists. Since 2020, she has served as mayor of the 12th arrondissement of Paris. She was a candidate for Paris's 8th constituency in the 2017 legislative election, and has been a member of the Council of Paris since 2020.
