= Council of Paris =

Body governing the capital of France

Council of Paris Conseil de Paris

Type
- Type: Unicameral

Leadership
- Mayor of Paris: Emmanuel Grégoire, PS since 29 March 2026
- Secretaries: Paul Hatte (the youngest councillor), Alice Timsit, Céline Hervieu and Raphaëlle Rémy-Leleu

Structure
- Seats: 163
- Political groups: Government (103): PS (53); EELV (36); PCF (14); Opposition (60): LR (32); HOR (11); LFI (9); MoDem (8)
- Length of term: 6 years

Elections
- Voting system: Party-list proportional representation
- Last election: 15 March & 22 March 2026
- Next election: 2032

Meeting place
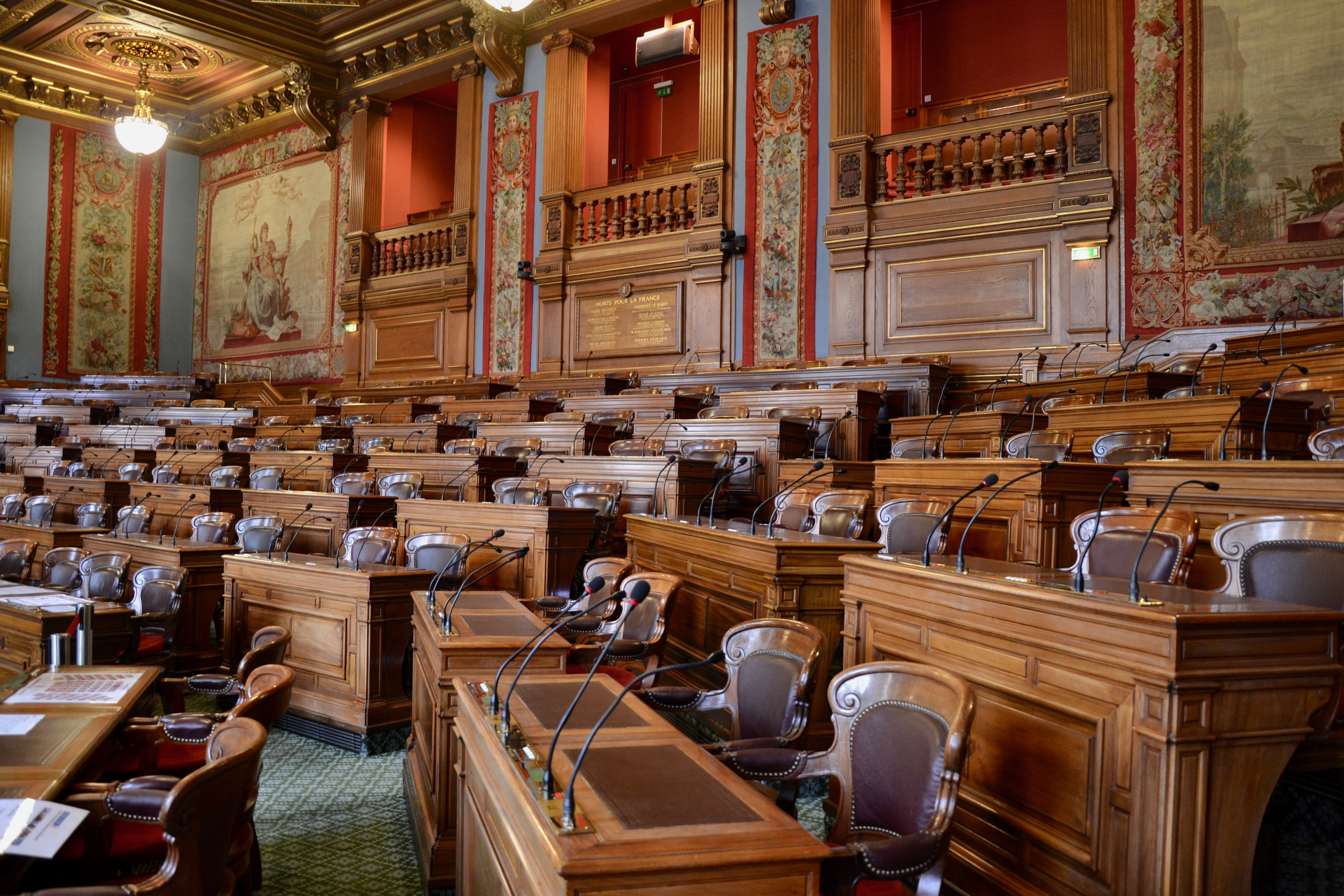
- Hôtel de Ville de Paris

Website
- Le Conseil de Paris

The Council of Paris (French: Conseil de Paris, [kɔ̃sɛj d(ə) paʁi]) is the deliberative body responsible for governing Paris, the capital of France. It possesses both the powers of a municipal council (conseil municipal) for the commune de Paris and those of a departmental council (conseil départemental) for the département de Paris, as defined by the so-called PLM Law (Loi PLM) of 1982 that redefined the governance of Paris, Lyon and Marseille (hence the PLM acronym). Strictly speaking, the Council of Paris is considered a municipal council rather than a departmental one, as it follows the electoral law and election timing of municipal councils and its presiding officer is called "Mayor" rather than "President of the Council of Paris". Paris is the only territorial collectivity in France to be both a commune and a département.

The Mayor of Paris presides over the Council of Paris and therefore holds the powers of mayor and of president of the departmental council. There are currently 163 councillors for Paris.

== History ==
Although the history of Paris spans millennia, that of its municipal government, in its present form, is less than half a century old. Paris and its environs were always governed directly by the highest French polity of the time: the Crown before the French Revolution, and a state-appointed préfet (governing the Seine département) afterwards. The office of mayor of Paris existed for brief periods during the 18th and 19th centuries, but was not an institution of government before 1977.

From the creation of the mayoral office in 1977 until 2019, Paris functioned as both a commune and as a département, and had a unique method for governing both; the Council of Paris, with the Mayor of Paris as its president, met either as a municipal council (conseil municipal) or as a departmental council (conseil général or conseil départemental) depending on the issue to be debated.

In 2017, the National Assembly passed a law merging the functions of the commune and department into the City of Paris (Ville de Paris), which came into effect on 1 January 2019.

The modern administrative organization of Paris still retains some traces of its previous incarnation as the government of the Seine département. France's national government still controls the Paris Police Prefecture (Préfecture de police), which also has authority over the Paris Fire Brigade, for example, and has jurisdiction extending to the petite couronne ('small corona' or 'halo') of Paris, the three bordering départements (Seine-Saint-Denis, Hauts de Seine, and Val de Marne) for some operations such as fire protection and rescue operations. Paris has no municipal police force, although it does have its own brigade of traffic wardens.

== Electoral system and composition ==
The commune is divided into 17 electoral districts representing the 20 municipal arrondissements (arrondissements municipaux) in which voters simultaneously elect members of the district council (conseil d'arrondissement) and city council (conseil municipal). After the 2020 municipal election, arrondissements 1, 2, 3 & 4 were merged into a single electoral district called Paris Centre. No district elects fewer than 10 district members and 3 council members, nor more than 40 district members and 18 council members. There are 354 district council members and 163 council members in all. A number of members from each district council — roughly half the seats in each council, as well as those at the top of the party lists in those districts — are elected to and simultaneously serve as city council members, forming the municipal council called the Council of Paris. The council elects the Mayor of Paris the week after the municipal election, requiring an absolute majority of councillors in the first or second round, or by a plurality in the third round if necessary.

The districts and city council are elected using closed party-list proportional representation in a two-round system with a majority bonus. A party list which garners an absolute majority in the first round of an election in which at least 25% of registered voters participates automatically wins half of all seats in the arrondissement, with the remaining half distributed proportionally using the D'Hondt method to all lists receiving over 5% of the vote, including the winning list. If no party list meets these requirements in the first round, a second round is scheduled a week later. All lists which have won over 10% of the vote in the first round are qualified to run in the second. In addition, any other lists which have won at least 5% of the vote in the first round can merge with qualified lists for the second, but are not required to do so. In the second round, only a plurality is needed to win the majority bonus. This electoral system means a party list may receive a majority of seats in an arrondissement without winning an absolute majority of votes.

== Councillors elected for the 2026–2032 term ==
This table summarises the results of the 2026 Paris municipal election.

| Candidate | Party | First round | | Second round | | Seats | |
| Candidate | Party | Votes | % | Votes | % | Nb. | +/- |
|---|---|---|---|---|---|---|---|
| Emmanuel Grégoire | PS-LE-PCF-PP-L'A-GRS | 309,693 | 37.98% | 428,143 | 50.52% | 103 | ▲7 |
| Rachida Dati | LR-MoDem-UDI-PR | 207,613 | 25.46% | 351,825 | 41.52% | 51 | ▼15 |
| Pierre-Yves Bournazel | HOR-RE-LC-Cap21-MEI | 92,448 | 11.34% | 351,825 | 41.52% | 51 | ▼15 |
| Sophia Chikirou | LFI-PG-POI | 95,551 | 11.72% | 67,464 | 7.96% | 9 | ▲8 |
| Sarah Knafo | REC | 84,809 | 10.40% | Withdrawal | | 0 | 0 |
| Thierry Mariani | RN-LDP-UDR-RPR-IDL-L'AF | 13,096 | 1.61% | — | | 0 | 0 |
| Blandine Chauvel | NPA-R | 5,991 | 0.73% | — | | 0 | 0 |
| Marielle Saulnier | LO | 5,544 | 0.68% | — | | 0 | 0 |
| Mahel Pierot-Guimbaud | PT | 703 | 0.09% | — | | 0 | 0 |
| Registered voters | | 1,405,332 | 58.89 | 1,404,863 | 61.60 | | |
| Abstention | | 577,733 | 41.11 | 539,497 | 38.40 | | |
| Total votes | | 827,599 | 100.00 | 865,366 | 100.00 | | |
| Blank or invalid votes | | 12,151 | 0.86 | 5,696 | 0.66 | | |
| Valid votes | | 815,448 | 98.53 | 847,432 | 97.93 | | |

== See also ==
- Administration of Paris
- List of Paris' councillors (2014–2020)
- Municipal arrondissements of France
- Paris Fire Brigade
- Prefecture of Police
- Seine (department)
- Seine-et-Oise
- Municipal Council of Paris
