= Federation of the Republican Left =

Federation of the Republican Left Fédération de la gauche républicaine
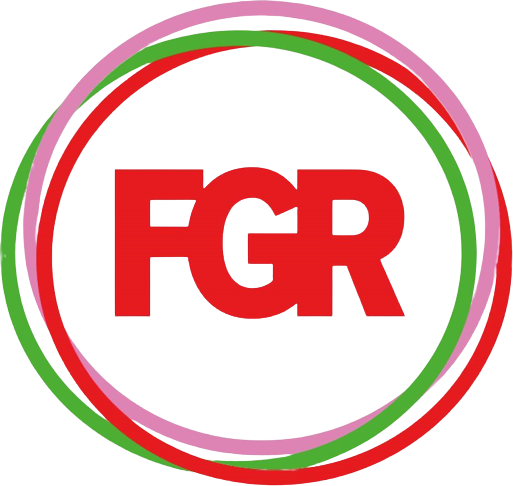
- Abbreviation: FGR
- Founded: 29 April 2022
- Ideology: Democratic socialism
- Political position: Centre-left to left-wing
- National affiliation: with French Communist Party (2024–); New Popular Front (2024–)
- Member parties: Republican and Socialist Left; Citizen and Republican Movement; L'Engagement; Radicals of the Left; New Socialist Left; Popular Ecology; The Socialists
- Colours: Red; Green; Pink
- Senate: 1 / 348
- National Assembly: 1 / 577
- European Parliament: 1 / 79

Website
- gaucherepublicaine2022.fr

The Federation of the Republican Left (French: Fédération de la gauche républicaine; FGR) is a French political coalition of several small centre-left to left-wing parties.

Announced on 29 April 2022, following the 2022 French presidential election, the federation presents several candidates for the June 2022 French legislative election, often in alliance with the Radical Left Party and dissidents from the Socialist Party (PS) opposed to the integration of the PS into the New Ecological and Social People's Union.

== Foundation ==
Five political parties and several personalities announced their participation in the federation at its foundation:

- The Republican and Socialist Left (GRS), founded in 2019 by dissidents from the PS and the MRC, led by Emmanuel Maurel, MEP, and Marie-Noëlle Lienemann, Senator;
- The Citizen and Republican Movement (MRC), a sovereignist party founded in 2003 and chaired by Jean-Luc Laurent, mayor of Kremelin-Bicêtre;
- The Radicals of the Left (LRDG), split from the Radical Left Party founded in 2017 and co-chaired by Stéphane Saint-André and Isabelle Amaglio-Térisse;
- L'Engagement, a party founded by Arnaud Montebourg;
- New Socialist Left (NGS), split from the PS founded in 2015 by Liêm Hoang-Ngoc.

On a personal note, several political figures have also expressed their support for the federation:

- Laurence Rossignol of the PS, senator and vice-president of the Senate;
- Mickaël Vallet of the PS, senator,

They were then joined by the groups Les Socialistes (created by slingers in 2016) and L'Écologie populaire.

== Members ==
In May 2022, the federation brought together seven parties: Republican and Socialist Left, Citizen and Republican Movement, Popular Ecology, Socialists, L'Engagement, Radicals of the Left, and New Socialist Left. In some constituencies, they have formed an alliance with the Radical Party of the Left.

Party	Logo	Abbr.	Ideology	Position	Leader(s)
Republican and Socialist Left		GRS	Socialism, eco-socialism	Centre-left to left-wing	Emmanuel Maurel; Bastien Faudot
Citizen and Republican Movement		MRC	Left-wing Gaullism, souverainism, soft Euroscepticism, dirigisme	Left-wing	Jean-Luc Laurent
L'Engagement		L'E		Centre-left to left-wing	Arnaud Montebourg
The Radicals of the Left		LRDG	Radicalism		Stéphane Saint-André; Isabelle Amaglio-Térisse
New Socialist Left		NGS			Liêm Hoang-Ngoc
Popular Ecology		EP	Political ecology		
The Socialists		LS			

== 2022 legislative elections ==
The coalition declared to its foundation that it wants to work on the dynamics of rallying on the left. On 2 May a joint letter is sent to La France insoumise to begin negotiations to integrate the New Ecologic and Social People's Union (NUPES); this request went unanswered.

On 20 May the coalition announced that it would present candidates in more than a hundred constituencies for the 2022 French legislative election. They include alliances with the Radical Party of the Left, which internally rejected integration into NUPES, and with dissidents from the Socialist Party. Their representatives present themselves as the candidates of the "secular and republican" left between Emmanuel Macron and Jean-Luc Mélenchon.

== Election results ==
=== European Parliament ===
Election	Leader	Votes	%	Seats	+/−	EP Group
2024 (Note: Run in a joint list with PCF, PCR, PCM and HeD, that won no seats.)	Léon Deffontaines	584,020	2.36 (#8)	0 / 81	New	−
