= Cécile Rilhac =

French politician

Member of the National Assembly for Val-d'Oise's 3rd constituency
- In office 21 June 2017 – 9 June 2024
- Preceded by: Jean-Noël Carpentier
- Succeeded by: Emmanuel Maurel

Personal details
- Born: 21 April 1974 (age 51) Paris, France
- Party: En Commun; Renaissance; Movement of Progressives (2017-2019)
- Profession: Teacher

Cécile Rilhac (born 21 April 1974) is a French politician of Renaissance (RE) who has been serving as a member of the French National Assembly between 2017 and 2024, representing the department of Val-d'Oise.

== Political career ==
In Parliament, Rilhac serves on the Committee on Cultural Affairs and Education. In addition to her committee assignments, she is part of the French-Algerian Parliamentary Friendship Group.

In 2020, Rilhac joined En Commun (EC), a group within LREM led by Barbara Pompili. In 2023, she left the Renaissance group, together with Pompili, Mireille Clapot and Stella Dupont.

== Political positions ==
=== Domestic policy ===
In June 2019, Rilhac was one of four members of the LREM parliamentary group who joined a cross-party initiative to legalization, the distribution and use of cannabis. Along with four other LREM members – Coralie Dubost, Jean-Michel Mis, Stéphane Trompille, and Éric Bothorel –, she disassociated herself from their colleague Aurore Bergé when the latter announced her intention in October 2019 to vote for a Republican draft law banning the wearing of the hijab by women accompanying groups of students on school outings.

In 2020, Rilhac was one of ten LREM members who voted against her parliamentary group's majority and opposed a much discussed security bill drafted by her colleagues Alice Thourot and Jean-Michel Fauvergue that helps, among other measures, curtail the filming of police forces.

=== Foreign policy ===
In 2018, Rilhac joined other co-signatories around Sébastien Nadot in officially filing a request for a commission of inquiry into the legality of French weapons sales to the Saudi-led coalition fighting in Yemen, days before an official visit of Saudi Crown Prince Mohammed bin Salman to Paris.

In July 2019, Rilhac voted in favor of the French ratification of the European Union’s Comprehensive Economic and Trade Agreement (CETA) with Canada.

== See also ==
- 2017 French legislative election
- 2022 French legislative election
