= Plural Left =

Left-wing coalition in France

The Gauche Plurielle (French for Plural Left) was a left-wing coalition in France, composed of the Socialist Party (Parti socialiste or PS), the French Communist Party (Parti communiste français or PCF), the Greens, the Left Radical Party (Parti radical de gauche or PRG), and the Citizens' Movement (Mouvement des citoyens or MDC). Succeeding Alain Juppé's conservative government, the Plural Left governed France from 1997 to 2002. It was another case of cohabitation between rival parties at the head of the state and of the government (Jacques Chirac as president and Lionel Jospin as prime minister). Following the failure of the left in the 2002 legislative election, it was replaced by another conservative government, this time headed by Jean-Pierre Raffarin.

The Plural Left government initiated several reforms, including the CMU social welfare program for indigents, the PACS civil union law, the 35 hours workweek, the creation of the FNAEG DNA database, but also several privatizations (France Télécom, GAN, Thomson Multimédia, Air France, Eramet, Aérospatiale, Autoroutes du sud de la France). It also passed the SRU Law forcing each commune to have a 20% quota of housing projects, the 15 June 2000 Guigou law on presumption of innocence, the Taubira Law recognizing slavery as a crime against humanity, and the LSQ law concerning security. Furthermore, Jospin's government carried out a partial regularization of undocumented immigrants.

== Origins ==
During the 1970s, the PS, the PCF and the Left-wing Radicals formed the "Union of the Left" based on a Common Programme (1972). But the policy of Socialist leader François Mitterrand, elected President of France in 1981, did not correspond exactly to this programme, notably since 1983. One year later, the Communist ministers resigned. After that, the "Union of Left" was only a circumstantial electoral alliance.

After Mitterrand's re-election in 1988, the PS and the Left-wing radicals obtained a relative parliamentary majority. However, the PCF chose to support the government only issue-to-issue. Consequently, the PS tried an alliance with the center-right which ultimately failed. Due to its electoral disaster in 1993. new PS leader, former Prime Minister Michel Rocard, called for a political "big-bang", a new attempt of to transcend the traditional Left-Right divide in French politics. This was generally seen as unsuccessful. Rocard resigned the leadership of the PS after its loss in the 1994 European Parliament election.

The PS contested the 1995 presidential election, but was not in a position to win without electoral alliances. Its candidate Lionel Jospin was supported by the PRG and the MDC.

In 1994, Robert Hue succeeded Georges Marchais as head of the PCF. Responding to the fall of communism in Eastern Europe and the USSR, Hue campaigned on broadening the PCF's electoral base. This was part of a larger strategy addressing the PCF's ongoing electoral decline—following the split of the European Communist bloc from the Soviet Union in the 1970s the French Communist Party had entered a period of electoral decline, its electoral vote totals being reduced by half.

The Greens, founded in 1984, benefited from the PS crisis at the beginning of the 1990s. However, their leader Antoine Waechter refused to integrate the party in the left/right cleavage. Without allies, the Greens were unable to gain seats and enter government. In 1993, Dominique Voynet, who favoured an alliance with the left-wing parties, replaced Waechter.

Jospin lost the second round of the presidential election, but obtained a respectable result. The 5 left-wing parties formed a coalition called the "Plural Left". The name was founded by the Socialist politician Jean-Christophe Cambadélis. It meant the PS wanted to respect its allies and not to impose its hegemony, what the other parties reproached it.

== Jospin's government ==
In 1997, President Chirac dissolved the French National Assembly before the expected end of term in 1998. Much to his surprise, the left won the legislative election.

Chirac's then advisor, Dominique de Villepin, is rumoured to have been behind the move. The decision surprised many: although it was the fourth dissolution from a directly elected President, it was most importantly the first one for no given reason - inspired perhaps by the Westminster tradition.

The left-wing parties were:

- Socialists, who had been in power for ten of the last sixteen years, yet were being criticized inside and outside the party
- Communists, who fell from Postwar's First party to a single-digit party, yet experiencing a last surge at the time
- Radicals, acting as a more centrist counterweight to Communists
- The Citizens' Movement, born in 1993 as a left-wing Eurosceptic force, which also incorporated Left-wing Gaullists, Radicals, and Feminists
- The Greens, who experienced great divisions in the 1990s on strategic issues, and who had just chosen to side with the Left

The French MPs were elected within 577 single-winner districts through a two-round system. Tactically, it is near to impossible to win without multiple-party agreements, except when the President's party can draw a large support.

- First-round agreements
  - In January 1997, the Socialist party withdrew from 29 districts against the Green party's withdrawal from 79 others.
  - The Socialist party and the Radicals decided that in 40 districts, they would support a common candidate
  - Communists and Citizens did not pass any agreements with Socialists
- Entre-deux-tours agreements
  - Communists withdrew from 16 districts where Citizens were in the runoff, and Citizens called to vote for 33 Communist candidates
  - Automatic withdrawal for the best left-wing candidate in the case of triangulaires or quadrangulaires

There was little to no platform agreement

The final results:

- Socialist group: 250 MPs
- Communist group: 36 MPs
- Radical, Citizen and Green group: 33 MPs (Radical: 12, Greens: 7, Citizens: 7, Misc.: 4)

The balance of power was clear: Socialists were the driving force, and their lack of cohesion might be fixed by the other parties. Jospin became prime minister. On May 14, he announced that the political balance of power would be the same of the first-round results.

In his government, not counting secretaries of state (the third tier in the hierarchy), there were:

- 10 Socialist ministers and 8 delegate-ministers
- 2 Communists ministers: Jean-Claude Gayssot for the Transport ministry, Marie-George Buffet for the Youth and Sports ministry
- 1 Green minister: Dominique Voynet for the Environment ministry
- 2 Left-wing Radicals: Emile Zuccarelli for the Civil Service ministry, Jacques Dondoux for the External Trade ministry)
- 1 MDC: Jean-Pierre Chevènement for the Interior ministry

== End ==
In 2000, Jean-Pierre Chevènement resigned because of his opposition to negotiations with the nationalists of Corsica. Preparing his candidacy for the 2002 presidential election, he criticized the governmental policy and proposed to rally the "Republicans of the left and the right".

In 2001, the economic growth slowed. The Communists and some Greens criticized the government's moderate economic policy. The Economy ministers, Dominique Strauss-Kahn and later Laurent Fabius, were accused of being social liberals because of the privatisation of public companies. They claimed no main social reforms were done after the reduction of working time to 35 hours. The parliamentary majority was divided about the law to restrict the dismissals.

The presidential campaign focused on an alleged insecurity problem. In contrast to the right, the left-wing coalition was divided about this problem and had not a clear policy. Finally, those who were disappointed by the "Plural Left" voted for the Trotskyist candidates (Arlette Laguiller, Olivier Besancenot, Daniel Gluckstein).

All the left-wing parties were represented by their candidates. In the first round, Jospin (PS) obtained 16.2%, Chevènement (MDC) 5.3%, Noël Mamère (the Greens) 5.2%, Hue (PCF) 3.4%, Christiane Taubira (PRG) 2.3%. Arriving in third position, Jospin was eliminated and no left-wing candidate contested the second round, leaving space for far-right candidate Jean-Marie Le Pen. Two months later, the left lost the 2002 legislative elections.

In consequence, Jospin announced his political retirement. Hue stepped down the head of the PCF, replaced by Marie-George Buffet who attempted to continue the PCF's policy of opening towards social movements, including the alter-globalization movement. Chevènement failed to rally all the "Republicans" and founded a new left-wing party, the Citizen and Republican Movement (Mouvement républicain et citoyen or MRC). After an attempt to ally with a part of the far-left, the Greens returned finally in the parliamentary left.

== See also ==
- Couverture maladie universelle (CMU, a social welfare program)
- FNAEG, a government database registering DNA information
- New Ecologic and Social People's Union, 2022 left-wing political alliance
- New Popular Front, 2024 left-wing political alliance
