= Union of the Left (France) =

Political coalition in France

Union of the Left (French: L'Union de la gauche) is a strategic electoral coalition of leftist and centre-left political parties in France. The term originally referred to the alliance from 1972 to 1977 between the French Communist Party (PCF) and the Socialist Party (PS) as the two major partners.

The New Popular Front formed in 2024, which consists of centre-left, leftist, and far-left parties, and is endorsed by many trade unions

== History ==
The term originated to describe the coalition formed between the Socialist Party (PS), Movement of the Radical Left(MGRS), and the French Communist Party (PCF) from 1972 to 1977, based on the Programme commun platform, and the subsequent governments involving these parties under President François Mitterrand.

The term resurfaces every few years in French political spheres when left-wing parties and movements strategise and unify as a bloc against the center or right-wing counterparts.

== Current coalition ==
The Union of the Left (New Popular Front) currently consists of the following parties:

- La France Insoumise
- Socialist Party of France
- Ecologist Pole
- Republican and Socialist Left
- French Communist Party
- Génération.s
- New Anticapitalist Party
- Miscellaneous left
