= Plural Left (disambiguation) =

Plural Left was a left-wing coalition which governed France from 1997 to 2002.

Plural Left may also refer to:

- Plural Left (Guadeloupe), political party of Guadeloupe
- Plural Left (Spain, 2011), also known as United Left-The Greens: Plural Left, an electoral coalition formed in 2011 to contest the 2011 Spanish general election
- Plural Left (Spain, 2014), an electoral coalition formed in 2014 to contest the 2014 European Parliament election in Spain

== See also ==
- Pluralist Left
