= Val-de-Marne's 10th constituency =

Constituency of the National Assembly of France

10th constituency of Val-de-Marne
- inline Constituency of the National Assembly of France

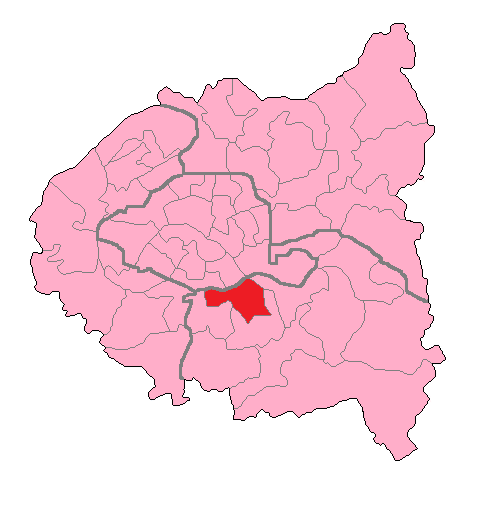
- Val-de-Marne's 10th Constituency shown within Île-de-France
- Deputy: Mathilde Panot; LFI
- Department: Val-de-Marne
- Cantons: Ivry-sur-Seine-Est - Ivry-sur-Seine-Ouest - Kremlin-Bicêtre - Vitry-sur-Seine-Nord
- Registered voters: 64,439

The 10th constituency of Val-de-Marne is a French legislative constituency in the Val-de-Marne département.

== Description ==
The 10th constituency of Val-de-Marne is in the north west of the department bordering Paris to the north. It includes the suburb of Ivry-sur-Seine and the north of Vitry-sur-Seine along with Kremlin-Bicêtre.

Since its creation in 1988 the seat has been solidly left wing and was held by the Communist Party until 2012 when the Left Party (France) candidate withdrew in favour of fellow left wing candidate Jean-Luc Laurent from the second round having come second in the first round of voting. As no other candidate reached required threshold of 12.5% of the registered electorate this left Jean-Luc Laurent as the only candidate in the second round.

== Historic Representation ==
Election	Member	Party
1986	Proportional representation – no election by constituency	
1988	Jean-Claude Lefort	PCF
1993	Jean-Claude Lefort	PCF
1997	Jean-Claude Lefort	PCF
2002	Jean-Claude Lefort	PCF
2007	Pierre Gosnat	PCF
2012	Jean-Luc Laurent	MRC
2017	Mathilde Panot	LFI
2022	Mathilde Panot	LFI

== Election results ==
=== 2024 ===
Candidate	Party	Alliance	First round			Second round		
Candidate	Party	Alliance	Votes	%	+/–	Votes	%	+/–
Mathilde Panot	LFI	NFP	25,536	59.27	+4.43			
Shannon Seban	RE	ENS	7,977	18.51	-2.28			
Elise Lin	RN		6,408	14.87	+5.29			
Coraline Barberon	DIV		1,788	4.15	N/A			
Christine Lichtenauer	LO		491	1.14	-0.95			
Charlotte Sevestre	REC		469	1.09	-2.65			
Selma Labib	NPA		212	0.49	N/A			
Farid Aïssaoui	DIV		204	0.47	N/A			
Valid votes			43,085	97.63	-0.06			
Blank votes			664	1.50	-0.16			
Null votes			381	0.86	+0.22			
Turnout			44,130	66.23	+21.39			
Abstentions			22,498	33.77	-21.39			
Registered voters			66,628					
Source: Ministry of the Interior, Le Monde
Result						LFI HOLD		

=== 2022 ===
Legislative Election 2022: Val-de-Marne's 10th constituency
Party	Candidate	Votes	%	±%
LFI (NUPÉS)	Mathilde Panot	16,122	54.84	+16.67
LREM (Ensemble)	Philippe Hardouin	6,113	20.79	-9.83
RN	Elise Lin	2,817	9.58	+2.74
UDI (UDC)	Alex Joubert	1,407	4.79	−1.81
REC	Laurine Ladian-Fassi	1,100	3.74	N/A
DVE	Bernard Chappellier	783	2.66	N/A
EXG	Christine Lichtenauer	614	2.09	N/A
DVE	César Courant	442	1.50	N/A
Turnout		30,090	44.84	−1.28
2nd round result
LFI (NUPÉS)	Mathilde Panot	18,739	67.63	+15.41
LREM (Ensemble)	Philippe Hardouin	3,969	32.37	−15.41
Turnout		27,708	43.37	+6.09
LFI hold				

=== 2017 ===
Legislative Election 2017: Val-de-Marne's 10th constituency
Party	Candidate	Votes	%	±%
LREM	Sheerazed Boulkroun	8,942	30.62	N/A
LFI	Mathilde Panot	4,687	16.05	N/A
PCF	Pascal Cavoldelli	4,435	15.19	−15.09
MRC	Jean-Luc Laurent	3,673	12.58	−20.75
EELV	Mehdy Belabbas	2,023	6.93	+0.42
FN	Martine Blanluette	1,998	6.84	−2.80
LR	Marie Andria	1,927	6.60	−6.21
Others	N/A	1,519		
Turnout		29,717	46.12	−5.11
2nd round result
LFI	Mathilde Panot	12,547	52.22	N/A
LREM	Sheerazed Boulkroun	11,479	47.78	N/A
Turnout		24,026	37.28	+8.93
LFI gain from MRC		Swing		

=== 2012 ===
Legislative Election 2012: Val-de-Marne's 10th constituency
Party	Candidate	Votes	%	±%
MRC	Jean-Luc Laurent	10,810	33.33	+9.77
FG	Pierre Gosnat*	9,821	30.28	+1.35
UMP	Bruno Castelnau	4,155	12.81	−12.43
FN	Mickael Ehrminger	3,125	9.64	+6.09
EELV	Mehdy Belabbas	2,110	6.51	+3.06
MoDem	Said Hassani	755	2.33	−5.19
Others	N/A	1,654		
Turnout		32,430	51.23	−4.57
2nd round result
MRC	Jean-Luc Laurent	17,943	100.00	N/A
Turnout		17,943	28.35	−23.25
MRC gain from PCF				

* Withdrew before the 2nd round

=== 2007 ===
Legislative Election 2007: Val-de-Marne's 10th constituency
Party	Candidate	Votes	%	±%
PCF	Pierre Gosnat	9,734	28.93	+3.80
UMP	Philippe Bachschmidt	8,494	25.24	+3.06
MRC	Jean-Luc Laurent	7,928	23.56	+3.00
MoDem	Annie Le Franc	2,529	7.52	N/A
FN	Thérèse Patry	1,193	3.55	−6.17
LV	Chantal Duchene	1,162	3.45	−1.68
Far left	Pascal La Phat Tan	974	2.89	N/A
Others	N/A	1,633		
Turnout		34,114	55.80	−6.11
2nd round result
PCF	Pierre Gosnat	19,708	64.70	+2.95
UMP	Philippe Bachschmidt	10,754	35.30	−2.95
Turnout		31,553	51.60	−3.80
PCF hold				

=== 2002 ===
Legislative Election 2002: Val-de-Marne's 10th constituency
Party	Candidate	Votes	%	±%
PCF	Jean-Claude Lefort	8,306	25.13	−7.23
UMP	Michele Pesenti	7,331	22.18	N/A
PS	Maria Moranchel	6,795	20.56	+2.75
FN	Therese Patry	3,212	9.72	−3.63
LV	Chantal Duchene	1,694	5.13	N/A
PR	Jean-Luc Laurent	1,435	4.34	N/A
UDF	Annie Begot	1,249	3.78	−13.44
LCR	Carine Barbier	956	2.89	N/A
Others	N/A	2,072		
Turnout		33,560	61.91	−2.46
2nd round result
PCF	Jean-Claude Lefort	17,905	61.75	−38.25
UMP	Michele Pesenti	11,089	38.25	N/A
Turnout		30,034	55.40	+4.16
PCF hold				

=== 1997 ===
Legislative Election 1997: Val-de-Marne's 10th constituency
Party	Candidate	Votes	%	±%
PCF	Jean-Claude Lefort	10,921	32.36	
PS	Patrick Zaregradsky*	6,011	17.81	
UDF	Annie Lefranc	5,811	17.22	
FN	Marcel Laprevotte	4,504	13.35	
Far left	Chantal Duchêne	1,597	4.73	
LO	Danielle Riche	1,234	3.66	
GE	Michèle Abramowicz	954	2.83	
Others	N/A	2,717		
Turnout		34,807	64.37	
2nd round result
PCF	Jean-Claude Lefort	19,965	100.00	
Turnout		27,707	51.24	
PCF hold				

* Withdrew before the 2nd round

== Sources ==
Official results of French elections from 2002: "Résultats électoraux officiels en France" (in French).
