= Zaki Ali Toumbou =

French serial killer and criminal (born 1998)

- Born: 21 October 1998 (age 27); Bandraboua, Mayotte
- Other names: The "Montluçon Killer"; The "Barbarian of Montluçon"
- Convictions: Murder x3 Gang rape x1 False imprisonment x2
- Penalty: Life imprisonment with a minimum term of 22 years

Details
- Victims: 3
- Span of crimes: 3 – 12 March 2017
- Country: France
- State: Auvergne-Rhône-Alpes
- Date apprehended: 13 March 2017

Zaki Ali Toumbou (born 21 October 1998) is a French criminal and serial killer.

With the help of an accomplice, Toumbou murdered a retired couple, murdered a third retired woman, and committed rape and kidnapping in Montluçon in March 2017. This case earned him and his accomplices the nickname ‘Barbarians of Montluçon.’

== Biography ==
=== Early life ===
Zaki Ali Toumbou was born on 21 October 1998 in Bandraboua (Mayotte). His childhood was marked by violence: he was slapped and beaten with a belt. From an early age, he began stealing and was subject to disciplinary measures at school.

In 2012, at the age of 13, he began using cannabis and then started drinking alcohol. Toumbou later explained that his goal in using these substances was to win the pride of his family. In 2013, he organised a mass brawl at his school. The supervisors arrested him and found him in possession of drugs. Toumbou was arrested and charged with drug trafficking, but was released. He was expelled from his school and sent to Toulouse (France).

On 18 May 2014, the Mamoudzou Juvenile Court sentenced him to a ban on residing in Mayotte, a decision that was upheld on appeal on 18 February 2015. In 2014, at the age of 15, Toumbou arrived in Montluçon, where his 22-year-old brother was living to study for a B.T.S. diploma. He took on several fixed-term contracts but found himself easily unemployed. To remedy these shortcomings, Toumbou resumed selling drugs without getting arrested. His brother remained overwhelmed by his misdemeanours, to the point of requesting his return to Mayotte: a request that was refused.

In 2016, Toumbou met Dailami Attoumani, another Mahoran born in 1999, with whom he became friends. Toumbou greatly admired Attoumani, who had a strong influence over those around him.

=== The crimes in Montluçon ===
In November and December 2016, Toumbou committed five thefts in the town of Montluçon. The spoils of his thefts were often insignificant: meal vouchers and chicken stolen from a sandwich shop, bottles of wine, an extension cord and video cassettes from a neighbour's cellar. During the last theft, Toumbou hid in a shop aisle at closing time. After a search, he was finally spotted by staff and arrested. At the end of his police custody, Toumbou was charged with theft and then released under judicial supervision. His DNA was taken and recorded in the National Automated DNA Database.

On the night of 2 to 3 March 2017, Toumbou and Attoumani broke into the home of Ginette, 85, and Missimo Degl'Innoncenti, 71, in the town of Montluçon. The victims were tortured and brutally assaulted before being murdered. After committing the crime, Toumbou and Attoumani stole some of the couple's savings and left. Massimo's colleagues were concerned that they had not heard from him. Given the old man's age — he would have turned 72 in a few days — they decided to visit the couple's home. They encountered Attoumani at the entrance to the home as he was leaving. Intrigued by the stranger's visit, the colleagues discovered the couple's bodies and notified the police. Upon arrival, the police confirmed the deaths of the two victims. A judicial investigation was then opened for murders accompanied by acts of torture. DNA traces were found on the couple's car. The National Automated DNA Database established that the DNA belonged to Toumbou. This genetic evidence caught the attention of the investigators, but the absence of his DNA at the crime scene was not enough to make him a suspect. In addition, the witnesses did not recognise the young man.

On the night of 10 to 11 March, Toumbou, who was drunk, tried to force his way into a nightclub in the city. Two security guards caught him in the act and asked him to leave. One of the guards had a friend who was a police officer, so he decided to film the scene on his mobile phone. To maintain the upper hand, Toumbou boasted that he was the ‘killer of Montluçon.’ He eventually left, however, without achieving his goal. Intrigued by Toumbou's statements, the security guard went to the police station that same morning to report what he had heard. The police, however, claimed that Toumbou did not match the description of the suspect seen by witnesses on the night of the double murder.

On the night of 11 to 12 March, Toumbou and Attoumani broke into the home of 74-year-old Jeanine Ponce in Montluçon. The two young men tortured the elderly woman before murdering her. The victim's dog, frightened by the blows and injuries inflicted on its owner, took refuge under the shed on the property. After committing the crime, Toumbou and Attoumani searched the house and stole some of the elderly woman's savings before leaving. Following the murder, while her body had not yet been discovered, Toumbou and Attouani kidnapped and tortured a young couple and took turns raping the young woman. After several hours of torture, Toumbou and Attoumani leave without killing the couple. The two survivors alert the police and file a complaint for false imprisonment and gang rape. After lengthy questioning, the two victims manage to identify one of their attackers after being shown a photograph of Toumbou.

On the afternoon of 13 March, Jeanine Ponce's son became concerned when he had not heard from her. He decided to visit his mother's home and discovered her body. He called the police, who opened a criminal investigation for murder accompanied by acts of torture. It then became urgent for the police to arrest Toumbou.

=== Arrests and incarcerations ===
On the night of 13 March, Toumbou, aged 18, was arrested and taken into custody for gang rape and false imprisonment. He admitted to participating in these acts, but accused Attoumani of having been present at the scene. He also accused 19-year-old Ben Z. of having driven them to the scene of the crime. The next day, Ben Z. was arrested, while Attoumani remained at large after fleeing. In police custody, Ben Z. denied participating in the crimes or driving Toumbou and Attoumani to the scene of the crime. He said he had spent the evening of the crimes at home, but no one could confirm his statement, as the young man had been alone that evening. At the end of their police custody, Toumbou was charged with gang rape and false imprisonment and then placed in pre-trial detention at the Riom Remand Centre. Ben Z. was charged with complicity in gang rape and false imprisonment and placed in pre-trial detention at Moulins-Yzeure Remand Centre.

Toumbou was taken into custody again on 17 March for the double murder of the Degl'Innocenti couple. On the same day, two young men, one of whom was 17 years old, were taken into custody for this crime. Already in prison, Toumbou was charged with murders accompanied by acts of torture against vulnerable persons and then returned to the Riom prison. The following day, the two 17-year-old men were charged with the same offences and imprisoned at Moulins-Yzeure prison.

On the evening of 24 March, Attoumani was spotted and then arrested near Clermont-Ferrand train station. Placed in police custody in connection with the gang rape case, he admitted his involvement in all the crimes but claimed to have played a minor role in all of them. Like Toumbou, he confirmed that there were five perpetrators and accused Ben Z. and the two minors of complicity. At the end of his police custody, Attoumani was charged with gang rape and false imprisonment and placed in pre-trial detention at Moulins-Yzeure Remand Centre.

On 10 April, Toumbou, Attoumani and Ben Z. were once again taken into custody in connection with the murder of Jeanine Ponce. Only Toumbou and Attoumani admitted to participating in the crime. Ben Z. denied any involvement in the Montluçon crimes. He was therefore returned to the Moulins-Yzeure Remand Centre without being prosecuted for these offences. Already under investigation for the double murder of Mr and Mrs Degl'Innocenti, Toumbou was charged with the murder and acts of torture of Jeanine Ponce and then returned to the Riom Remand Centre. Attoumani was charged with murders accompanied by acts of torture against Massimo and Ginette Degl'Innocenti and Jeanine Ponce, then returned to the Moulins-Yzeure remand centre. The press dubbed them the ‘Barbarians of Montluçon’. Ben Z. was released on 16 June after his involvement in the crimes was ruled out. His lawyer deplored his three months of wrongful imprisonment, during which he celebrated his 20th birthday. Two of the 17-year-olds were also released on the same grounds.

On 12 September, Toumbou appeared before the criminal court for a series of thefts committed in 2016. Far from remaining silent, Toumbou claimed that he had committed these acts in order to feed himself. When questioned about the theft of the bottles of wine, he claimed to have drunk them with friends in a single day in the courtyard of his home on Place du 11-Novembre. At the end of the trial, Toumbou was given a six-month suspended prison sentence.

On 3 May 2019, Attoumani was released on the grounds that the pre-trial detention of a minor cannot exceed two years, as there was not enough time to bring him before a criminal court. Placed under electronic tagging, he was required to report three times a day in Clermont-Ferrand and had treatment obligations. He was arrested the following day after violating his judicial controls and was re-incarcerated at Saint-Étienne-La-Talaudière prison. A few weeks later, Toumbou and Attoumani were referred to the Juvenile Court of Allier. Ben Z. and the two 17-year-olds, meanwhile, had their cases dismissed.

=== Trial and sentencing ===
On 18 November 2019, the trial of Toumbou and Attoumani began before the Juvenile Court of Allier.

During the trial, Toumbou, 21, admitted to having acted with Attoumani in all of the crimes. However, he claimed to have acted under the influence of alcohol, after drinking with Attoumani. For his part, Attoumani, 20, persisted in claiming a secondary role as an accomplice. Psychiatrists, psychologists and investigators took the stand one after another. All described the two young men as ‘violent’, “alcoholics” and ‘drug addicts’. In the witness box, Toumbou and Attoumani admitted their crimes but remained vague in their explanations. The court was not sympathetic to these young men, who showed no remorse, and noted the violence orchestrated during the commission of the crimes.

On 22 November, Toumbou was sentenced to life imprisonment, with a minimum term of 22 years. Attoumani, who was a minor at the time of the crimes, was sentenced to 30 years' imprisonment: the maximum sentence for a minor between the ages of 16 and 18. Both appealed their convictions.

On 20 October 2020, the appeal trial of Toumbou and Attoumani began before the Juvenile Court of Puy-de-Dôme. During the trial, Toumbou apologised to the victims' families and said that not a day went by without him thinking about the case. Attoumani adopted the same position as in the first trial. On the stand, psychiatric experts identified Attoumani as having influence over Toumbou and deemed him to be the more dangerous of the two defendants. They then asserted that group dynamics contributed to the commission of the crimes. The public prosecutor did not take into account Toumbou's lesser role and requested the maximum sentences for both defendants, stating that there would have been other victims if they had not been arrested.

On 23 October, Toumbou, 22, was again sentenced to life imprisonment, with a minimum term of 22 years. Attoumani, 21, also had his 30-year prison sentence upheld. Toumbou and Attoumani's defence team lodged an appeal, but this was rejected on 28 July 2021.

=== Case of violence in detention ===
Incarcerated at the Riom prison, Toumbou was often insulted and mistreated by his fellow inmates. Unable to tolerate these insults, he eventually threatened to kill them.

On 12 January 2022, six of Toumbou's fellow inmates attacked him in the prison yard and beat him up. Guards were alerted and subdued the six assailants. When questioned about the incident, the six attackers claimed to have acted after receiving death threats from Toumbou. However, they admitted to having assaulted him because of his conviction for the crimes in Montluçon. The six men were then charged with assault and battery and transferred to another prison. Toumbou, meanwhile, was only slightly injured and his life was not in danger. Three of the attackers were subsequently released after serving their sentences.

Five of the six defendants appeared before the criminal court in Riom on 16 October 2024 for assault and battery against Toumbou. They were sentenced to terms ranging from six to nine months in prison. Toumbou remains incarcerated to this day. He will not be eligible for parole until 2039, when his minimum sentence expires.

== List of victims ==
Facts		Discovery		Identity	Age
Date	Place	Date	Place	Identity	Age
3 March 2017	Montluçon	3 March 2017	Montluçon	Massimo Degl'Innocenti	71
3 March 2017	Montluçon	3 March 2017	Montluçon	Ginette Degl'Innocenti	85
12 March 2017	Montluçon	13 March 2017	Montluçon	Jeanine Ponce	74
12 March 2017	Montluçon	12 March 2017	Montluçon	a young woman	?
12 March 2017	Montluçon	12 March 2017	Montluçon	a young man	?

== See also ==
- List of French serial killers
