= Dailami Attoumani =

French serial killer and criminal (born 1999)

- Born: 3 August 1999 (age 27); Mamoudzou, Mayotte
- Other names: The "Montluçon Killer"; The "Barbarian of Montluçon"
- Convictions: Murder x3 Gang rape x1 False imprisonment x2 Battery x1
- Penalty: 30 years' imprisonment

Details
- Victims: 3
- Span of crimes: 3 – 12 March 2017
- Country: France
- State: Auvergne-Rhône-Alpes
- Date apprehended: 24 March 2017; 4 May 2019

Dailami Attoumani (born 3 August 1999) is a French serial killer and criminal.

In March 2017, at the age of 17, Attoumani murdered a retired couple, killed a third retired woman, then kidnapped a couple and raped the young woman, with the help of an accomplice, in the town of Montluçon. This case earned them the nickname ‘Barbarians of Montluçon’. Attoumani is also responsible for a violent assault committed in Clermont-Ferrand in October 2016.

== Biography ==
=== Youth ===
Dailami Attoumani was born on 3 August 1999 in Mamoudzou (Mayotte). His father is Comorian, while his mother is from Mayotte. Attoumani grew up in a violent environment, where his father regularly beat him. At school, he and his classmates were often locked in cupboards, chained to their desks and beaten with rulers. As he grew up, Attoumani dropped out of school and ended up on the streets, where he fell in with a bad crowd. He took part in fights between neighbourhoods, which involved iron bars and machetes. Attoumani later confided that a rival gang could appear out of nowhere at any moment. Concerned about his violent associations, Attoumani's parents sent him to the Comoros several times, but the teenager continued to hang out with the wrong crowd.

In 2014, at the age of 14, Attoumani was sent to Dijon (France) by his parents, who led him to believe that he was going to spend the holidays with his uncle. Upon his arrival, they told him that he was coming to France permanently. Attoumani found it very difficult to cope with his parents' abandonment, which he saw as a betrayal. He began to sink into alcoholism and started using drugs.

At the end of 2015, Attoumani and his uncle moved to Montluçon. As his uncle began to neglect him, Attoumani quickly found himself left to his own devices and sank into marginality. Unable to find work, he ended up selling cannabis to feed himself. To escape his boredom, Attoumani regularly travelled to Clermont-Ferrand to stay with one of his cousins for several days at a time.

In 2016, he met Zaki Ali Toumbou, another Mayotte native born in 1998, with whom he became friends. Attoumani emerged as the leader of the group. He had authority over his friends and was able to influence other young people to join him in his misdeeds.

=== Crimes in Clermont-Ferrand and Montluçon ===
On the morning of 9 October 2016, Attoumani broke into Clermont-Ferrand station and smashed the windows and the ticket machine. Alerted by the noise, a security guard caught him and tried to restrain him. Caught in the act, Attoumani threw a computer at the guard's head and beat him up before running away. An hour later, a cleaning lady was surprised to see the broken windows at the station entrance. She entered the building and discovered the officer unconscious, locked in the room. Emergency services were called and the victim was transported directly to the university hospital. The injuries were minor, and the officer recovered without difficulty, but was forced to take five days off work. An investigation was launched for assault and battery and property damage. The unknown vandal's DNA was found but had no match in the National Automated DNA Database.

On the night of 2 to 3 March 2017, Attoumani and Toumbou broke into the home of Ginette, 85, and Missimo Degl'Innoncenti, 71, in the town of Montluçon. The victims were tortured and brutally assaulted before being murdered. After committing the crime, Toumbou and Attoumani stole some of the couple's savings and left. Massimo's colleagues were concerned that they had not heard from him. Given the old man's age — he would have turned 72 in a few days — they decided to visit the couple's home. They encountered Attoumani at the entrance to the house as he was leaving. Intrigued by his presence, the colleagues entered the house and discovered the couple's bodies. They notified the police, who confirmed the deaths of the two victims upon their arrival. A judicial investigation was then opened for murder accompanied by acts of torture. DNA traces were found on the couple's car. The National Automated DNA Database established that the DNA belonged to 18-years-old Toumbou. This genetic evidence caught the attention of the investigators, but the absence of his DNA at the crime scene was not enough to make him a suspect. In addition, the witnesses did not recognise the young man.

On the night of 11 to 12 March, Attoumani and Toumbou broke into the home of Jeanine Ponce, 74, in Montluçon. The two young men tortured the elderly woman before murdering her. The victim's dog, frightened by the blows and injuries inflicted on its owner, took refuge under the shed on the property. After committing the crime, Attoumani and Toumbou searched the house, stole some of the elderly woman's savings, and then left. Following the murder, while her body had not yet been discovered, Attoumani and Toumbou kidnapped and tortured a young couple and took turns raping the young woman. After two and a half hours of torture, Attoumani and Toumbou left the scene without killing the couple. The two survivors alerted the police and filed a complaint for false imprisonment and gang rape. After lengthy questioning, the two victims managed to identify one of their attackers after being shown a photograph of Toumbou. The next afternoon, Jeanine Ponce's son became concerned when he had not heard from her. He decided to go to his mother's house and discovered her body. He called the police, who opened a criminal investigation for murder accompanied by acts of torture. It then became urgent for the police to arrest Toumbou.

On the night of 13 March, Toumbou, aged 18, was arrested and taken into custody for gang rape and false imprisonment. He admitted to participating in these acts, but accused Attoumani of having been present at the scene. He also accused 19-year-old Ben Z. of having driven them to the scene of the crime. The next day, Attoumani fled after learning of Toumbou's arrest. Ben Z. was arrested but denied participating in the crimes or driving Toumbou and Attoumani to the scene of the crime. He said he spent the evening of the crimes at home, but no one could confirm his statement as he was alone that evening. At the end of their police custody, Toumbou was charged with gang rape and false imprisonment and then placed in pre-trial detention at the Riom Remand Centre. Ben Z. was charged with complicity in gang rape and false imprisonment and placed in pre-trial detention at Moulins-Yzeure prison. Four days later, Toumbou was taken into custody again for the double murder of the Degl'Innocenti couple, along with two 17-year-olds whom he accused of participating in the crime. Already in prison, Toumbou was charged with murders accompanied by acts of torture against vulnerable persons and then returned to the Riom Remand Centre. The following day, the two 17-year-olds were charged with the same offences and imprisoned at Moulins-Yzeure Remand Centre.

=== Arrest and imprisonment ===
On the evening of 24 March 2017, Attoumani was spotted and then arrested near Clermont-Ferrand train station. Placed in police custody in connection with the gang rape case, he admitted his involvement in all the crimes but claimed to have played a minor role in all of them. Like Toumbou, Attoumani confirmed that there were five perpetrators and accused Ben Z. and the two minors of complicity. He was charged with gang rape and false imprisonment and then placed in pre-trial detention at the Moulins-Yzeure prison. His DNA was entered into the FNAEG database. A few days later, it was found to match DNA found at the scene of the assault on the security guard in Clermont-Ferrand in October 2016.

On 10 April, Toumbou, Attoumani and Ben Z. were again taken into custody in connection with the murder of Jeanine Ponce. Only Toumbou and Attoumani admitted to participating in the crime. Ben Z. denied any involvement in the crimes in Montluçon. He was therefore returned to the Moulins-Yzeure prison without being prosecuted for these crimes. Already under investigation for the double murder of Mr and Mrs Degl'Innocenti, Toumbou was charged with the murder et acts of torture of Jeanine Ponce and then returned to the Riom Prison. Attoumani was charged with murders accompanied by acts of torture against Massimo and Ginette Degl'Innocenti and Jeanine Ponce, then returned to the Moulins-Yzeure prison. The press nicknamed them the ‘Barbarians of Montluçon’.

On 12 June, Attoumani was taken into custody in connection with the assault and damage caused in Clermont-Ferrand. He admitted to committing the offences. At the end of his police custody, Attoumani was charged with assault and battery resulting in less than eight days of temporary incapacity to work, damage to property and burglary, and then returned to Moulins-Yzeure prison. On 16 June, Ben Z. was released after his involvement in the crimes was ruled out. His lawyer deplored this period of wrongful imprisonment, during which he celebrated his 20th birthday. The other two 17-year-olds are also released on the same grounds.

On 1 March 2018, Attoumani appeared before the juvenile court for assault and battery resulting in less than eight days of temporary total incapacity, damage to property and burglary committed in Clermont-Ferrand. He repeated his confession made in police custody, acknowledging all the charges against him. The ‘shadow’ of the Montluçon crimes looms over the judgement and points to an escalation in criminal activity in just a few months. Attoumani is sentenced to eight months in prison, including four months without parole.

Attoumani was released on 3 May 2019 on the grounds that the pre-trial detention of a minor cannot exceed two years, as there was insufficient time to bring him before a criminal court. He was placed under electronic tagging, required to check in three times a day in Clermont-Ferrand and had to undergo treatment. He was arrested the next day after violating his judicial controls and re-incarcerated at the Saint-Étienne-La-Talaudière prison. After behaving violently towards his fellow inmates, Attoumani was finally placed in solitary confinement, in accordance with his request. A few weeks later, Attoumani and Toumbou were referred to the Allier Juvenile Assize Court. Ben Z. and the two 17-year-olds, meanwhile, had their cases dismissed.

=== Trial and convictions ===
On 18 November 2019, the trial of Attoumani and Toumbou began before the Allier Juvenile Assize Court.

During the trial, Attoumani, 20, insisted on claiming a secondary role as an accomplice: according to him, only Toumbou played the role of the murderer. For his part, Toumbou, 21, admitted to having acted with Attoumani in all of the crimes. However, he claimed to have acted under the influence of alcohol, after drinking with Attoumani. Psychiatrists, psychologists and investigators took the stand one after another. All described the two young men as ‘violent,’ “alcoholics” and ‘drug addicts.’ Attoumani is described as a serial killer who was arrested early in his career, and there is a high risk of recidivism due to his violence and ability to strike alone. In the dock, Attoumani and Toumbou admit to their crimes but remain vague in their explanations. The court was not sympathetic to these young men, who showed no remorse, and noted the violence orchestrated during the commission of the crimes.

On 22 November, Attoumani is sentenced to 30 years' imprisonment because he was a minor at the time of the offences. Toumbou is sentenced to life imprisonment with a minimum term of 22 years. Both appeal against their sentences.

On 20 October 2020, the appeal trial of Attoumani and Toumbou began before the Juvenile Assize Court of Puy-de-Dôme. During the trial, Attoumani maintained his position as an accomplice. Toumbou apologised to the victims' families and said that not a day went by without him thinking about the case. On the stand, psychiatric experts identified Attoumani as having influence over Toumbou and deemed him to be the more dangerous of the two defendants. They then asserted that group dynamics had contributed to the commission of the crimes. The public prosecutor did not take into account Toumbou's lesser role and requested the maximum sentences for both defendants, stating that there would have been other victims if they had not been arrested.

On 23 October, Attoumani, 21, was again sentenced to 30 years' imprisonment. Toumbou, 22, also had his life sentence confirmed, with a minimum term of 22 years. Attoumani and Toumboui's defence team lodged an appeal, but this was rejected on 28 July 2021.

=== Life in prison ===
Attoumani is still incarcerated at this time. He will not be eligible for parole until 2032.

== List of victims ==
Facts		Discovery		Identity	Age
Date	Place	Date	Place	Identity	Age
9 October 2016	Clermont-Ferrand	9 October 2016	Clermont-Ferrand	a security guard	41
3 March 2017	Montluçon	3 March 2017	Montluçon	Massimo Degl'Innocenti	71
3 March 2017	Montluçon	3 March 2017	Montluçon	Ginette Degl'Innocenti	85
12 March 2017	Montluçon	13 March 2017	Montluçon	Jeanine Ponce	74
12 March 2017	Montluçon	12 March 2017	Montluçon	a young woman	?
12 March 2017	Montluçon	12 March 2017	Montluçon	a young man	?

== See also ==
- List of French serial killers
