= Val-d'Oise's 3rd constituency =

Constituency of the French Fifth Republic

3rd constituency of Val-d'Oise
- inline Constituency of the National Assembly of France

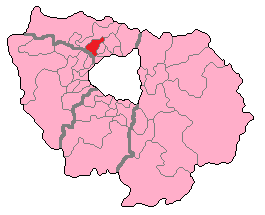
- Val-d'Oise's 3rd Constituency shown within Île-de-France
- Deputy: Emmanuel Maurel; Socialist
- Department: Val-d'Oise
- Cantons: Beauchamp - Cormeilles-en-Parisis - Herblay - Taverny
- Registered voters: 91,580

The 3rd constituency of Val-d'Oise is a French legislative constituency in the Val-d'Oise département. It is currently represented by Cécile Rilhac of Renaissance (RE).

== Description ==
The 3rd constituency of Val d'Oise includes the towns of Cormeilles-en-Parisis, Taverny and Herblay all of which form part of the northern suburbs of Paris.

The seat has a marginal profile and in 2012 was won by Jean-Noël Carpentier of Robert Hue's Progressive Unitary Movement becoming the party's one and only deputy.

== Historic Representation ==
Election	Member	Party
1967	Léon Feix	PCF
1968	Léon Feix	PCF
1973	Léon Feix	PCF
1978	Robert Montdargent	PCF
1981	Robert Montdargent	PCF
1986	Proportional representation – no election by constituency	
1988	Jean-Pierre Bequet	PS
1993	Jean Bardet	RPR
1997	Jean Bardet	RPR
2002	Jean Bardet	UMP
2007	Jean Bardet	UMP
2012	Jean-Noël Carpentier	MDP
2017	Cécile Rilhac	LREM
2022	Cécile Rilhac	RE
2024	Emmanuel Maurel	DVG

== Election results ==
=== 2024 ===
Candidate	Party	Alliance	First round			Second round		
Candidate	Party	Alliance	Votes	%	+/–	Votes	%	+/–
Emmanuel Maurel	DVG	NFP	22,742	35.63	+6.67	36,489	62.54	+14.70
Kimberley Lelaidier	RN		17,608	27.59	+11.45	21,860	37.46	N/A
Cécile Rilhac	RE	ENS	15,013	23.52	-4.85	WITHDREW		
Laetitia Vincent	DIV		4,816	7.55	N/A			
Samira Herbal	DIV		1,290	2.02	N/A			
Laetitia Guébin	DIV		1,046	1.64	N/A			
Alexandre Simonnot	REC		837	1.31	-3.77			
Juan Munoz	LO		468	0.73	-0.41			
Daniel Blaser	DIV		7	0.01	N/A			
Samira Belmokhtar	DIV		0	0.00	N/A			
Valid votes			63,827	98.00	-0.36	58,349	91.33	-2.33
Blank votes			930	1.43	+0.21	4,539	7.10	+2.60
Null votes			374	0.57	+0.15	997	1.56	-0.27
Turnout			65,131	67.63	+21.09	63,885	66.33	+20.45
Abstentions			31,175	32.37	-21.09	32,432	33.67	-20.45
Registered voters			96,306			96,317		
Source: Ministry of the Interior, Le Monde
Result						DVG GAIN FROM RE		

=== 2022 ===
Legislative Election 2022: Val-d'Oise's 3rd constituency
Party	Candidate	Votes	%	±%
LFI (NUPÉS)	Carine Pelegrin	12,537	28.96	+5.54
LREM (Ensemble)	Cécile Rilhac	12,284	28.37	-11.77
RN	Romana Laurini	6,989	16.14	+4.62
LR (UDC)	Sarah Nerozzi-Banfi	5,282	12.20	−4.53
REC	Pascal Gerard	2,199	5.08	N/A
DVE	Fabrice David	1,938	4.48	N/A
Others	N/A	2,068		
Turnout		44,019	46.54	−0.75
2nd round result
LREM (Ensemble)	Cécile Rilhac	21,200	52.16	-6.17
LFI (NUPÉS)	Carine Pelegrin	19,442	47.84	N/A
Turnout		40,642	45.88	+7.31
LREM hold				

=== 2017 ===
Candidate	Label	First round		Second round	
Candidate	Label	Votes	%	Votes	%
Cécile Rilhac	REM	17,105	40.14	18,464	58.33
Nicole Lanaspre	LR	7,128	16.73	13,193	41.67
Sébastien Davignon	FI	5,640	13.24		
Fabienne Daumas	FN	4,908	11.52		
Nelly Leon	PS	2,024	4.75		
Pierrette Borgne	ECO	1,351	3.17		
Laurent Jallu	PCF	962	2.26		
Pascal Beuret	DIV	687	1.61		
Marie-Martine Hulot	ECO	680	1.60		
Alexandre Simonnot	EXD	569	1.34		
Clément Corbeaux	DIV	479	1.12		
Olivier Corps	DIV	283	0.66		
Christophe Bertholet	DIV	269	0.63		
Muriel Monchal	EXG	242	0.57		
Michel Picquenot	REG	232	0.54		
Alain Poupard	EXG	54	0.13		
Votes		42,613	100.00	31,657	100.00
Valid votes		42,613	98.40	31,657	89.63
Blank votes		520	1.20	2,747	7.78
Null votes		175	0.40	914	2.59
Turnout		43,308	47.29	35,318	38.57
Abstentions		48,272	52.71	56,259	61.43
Registered voters		91,580		91,577	
Source: Ministry of the Interior

=== 2012 ===
Legislative Election 2012: Val-d'Oise's 3rd constituency
Party	Candidate	Votes	%	±%
MDP	Jean-Noël Carpentier	16,146	33.40	
UMP	Jean Bardet	15,036	31.10	
FN	Alexandre Simonnot	7,797	16.13	
DVG	Maurice Boscavert	3,124	6.46	
FG	Alain Feuchot	2,675	5.53	
EELV	Anne-Marie Cauet	1,740	3.60	
Others	N/A	1,830		
Turnout		48,348	54.93	
2nd round result
MDP	Jean-Noël Carpentier	24,185	52.05	
UMP	Jean Bardet	22,278	47.95	
Turnout		46,463	52.79	
MDP gain from UMP				

=== 2007 ===
Legislative Election 2007: Val-d'Oise's 3rd constituency
Party	Candidate	Votes	%	±%
UMP	Jean Bardet	22,014	45.11	
PS	Nelly Leon	11,046	22.63	
MoDem	Geneviève Carriou	5,134	10.52	
FN	Jean Busnel	2,323	4.76	
PCF	Jean-Noël Carpentier	2,191	4.49	
LV	Suzanne Auger	1,858	3.81	
Far left	Véronique Daniau	1,623	3.33	
Others	N/A	2,616		
Turnout		49,405	58.86	
2nd round result
UMP	Jean Bardet	24,246	54.03	
PS	Nelly Leon	20,632	45.97	
Turnout		46,115	54.94	
UMP hold				

=== 2002 ===
Legislative Election 2002: Val-d'Oise's 3rd constituency
Party	Candidate	Votes	%	±%
UMP	Jean Bardet	20,357	42.19	
PS	Philippe Doucet	13,666	28.32	
FN	Jean Busnel	6,249	12.95	
PCF	Isabelle Lefebvre	2,639	5.47	
Others	N/A	5,339		
Turnout		49,094	64.50	
2nd round result
UMP	Jean Bardet	24,290	56.50	
PS	Philippe Doucet	18,701	43.50	
Turnout		44,578	58.66	
UMP hold				

=== 1997 ===
Legislative Election 1997: Val-d'Oise's 3rd constituency
Party	Candidate	Votes	%	±%
RPR	Jean Bardet	13,549	29.07	
PS	Maurice Boscavert	11,635	24.96	
FN	Jean Cuihnache	8,097	17.37	
LV	Daniel Vasseure	1,679	3.60	
DVD	Annick Lemoine	1,401	3.01	
LO	Raymond Tavernier	1,356	2.91	
GE	Eric Denné	1,131	2.43	
Others	N/A	2,138		
Turnout		48,560	66.71	
2nd round result
RPR	Jean Bardet	24,643	50.53	
PS	Maurice Boscavert	24,130	49.47	
Turnout		51,716	71.04	
RPR hold				

== Sources ==
Official results of French elections from 2002: "Résultats électoraux officiels en France" (in French).
