= Toulouse Congress, 2012 =

Socialist Party (France) leadership election
| ← 2008 | 18 October 2012 | 2015 → |
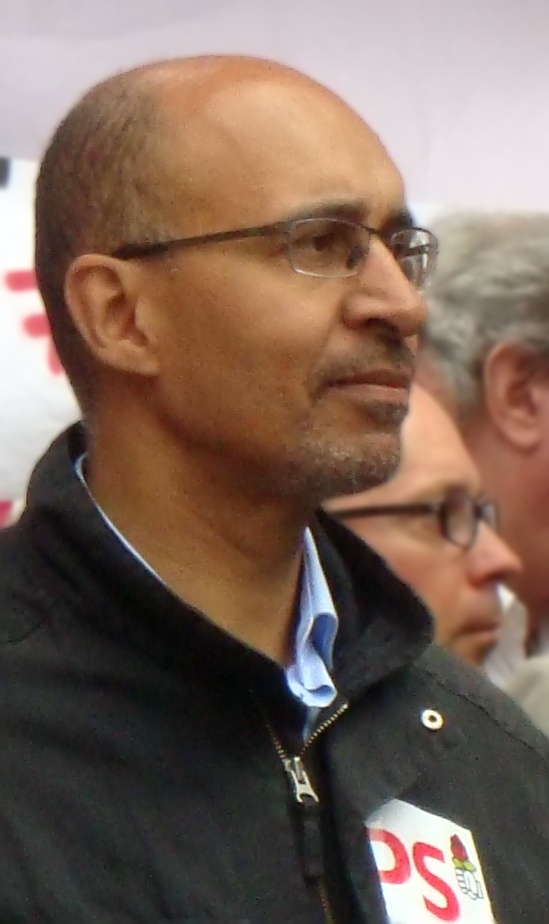

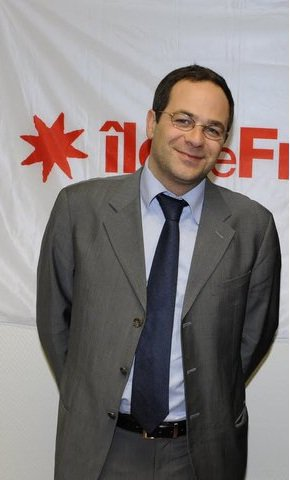
| Candidate | Harlem Désir | Emmanuel Maurel |
| Party | PS | PS |
| Percentage | 72% | 28% |
First Secretary before election
Harlem Désir
(Interim)
Elected First Secretary
Harlem Désir

The Second Toulouse Congress was the seventy-sixth national congress of the French Socialist Party (Parti socialiste or PS), the congress was held from October 26 to 28, 2012, in the city of Toulouse in the Haute-Garonne.

First Secretary Martine Aubry announced that she would not run for a second term. The National Secretary for Coordination Harlem Désir became the next party leader.

== Motions ==
Five motions were voted upon by members:

- Motion 1: "Mobilise the French People for a Successful Change" (Mobiliser les Français pour réussir le changement): Led by Harlem Désir and supported by Martine Aubry, Prime Minister Jean-Marc Ayrault, all socialist members of the Cabinet and a majority of MPs.
- Motion 2: "Matter of Principle" (Question de principes): Led by Juliette Méadel and endorsed by Gaëtan Gorce.
- Motion 3: "Now the Left" (Maintenant la gauche): Led by Emmanuel Maurel and supported by Marie-Noëlle Lienemann, Gérard Filoche, Jérôme Guedj and the Utopia movement.
- Motion 4: "Dare. Further. Faster" (Oser. Plus loin. Plus vite): Led by Stéphane Hessel and supported by Pierre Larrouturou.
- Motion 5: "Toulouse, my Congress" (Toulouse, mon congrès): Motion led by Constance Blanchard.

=== Results of the Motions vote ===
Popular vote
| Motion 1 (Désir) | 68.2% |
| Motion 3 (Maurel) | 13.4% |
| Motion 4 (Hessel) | 11.9% |
| Motion 2 (Méadel) | 5.2% |
| Motion 5 (Blanchard) | 1.4% |

== Election of the First Secretary ==
Popular vote
| Harlem Désir (Big tent) | 71.9% |
| Emmanuel Maurel (Left-wing) | 28.1% |

On October 12, 2012, Emmanuel Maurel confirmed that he would be a candidate for the Party Leadership. He lost to Harlem Désir.
