= Movement of Progressives =

Movement of Progressives Mouvement des progressistes
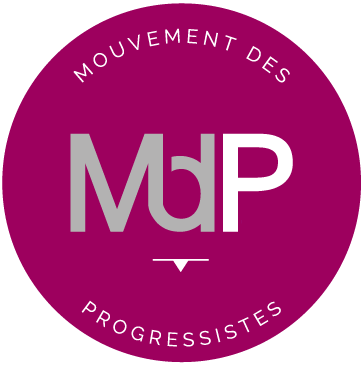
- Leader: Robert Hue
- Founded: 2009
- Ideology: Democratic socialism Progressivism
- Political position: Centre-left to left-wing
- National affiliation: New Popular Front (2024-present)
- National Assembly: 0 / 577
- Senate: 0 / 348
- European Parliament: 0 / 74
- Departmental councils: 0 / 4,108
- Regional councils: 0 / 1,758
- Presidency of departmental councils: 0 / 101
- Presidency of regional councils: 0 / 17

Website
- http://www.md-progressistes.fr/

The Movement of Progressives (French: Mouvement des progressistes, MDP) formerly known as the Progressive Unitary Movement, is a minor democratic-socialist political party in France.

== Election results ==
=== European Parliament ===
Election	Leader	Votes	%	Seats	+/−	EP Group
2019 (Note: Run in a joint list with GE, MEI and UDE, that won no seats.)	Dominique Bourg	412,136	1.82 (#12)	0 / 81	New	−
2024 (Note: Run in a joint list with PRG, R&PS, Volt, MDC and CSDR, that won no seats.)	Guillaume Lacroix	63,006	0.26 (#17)	0 / 81	0	−
