= Côtes-d'Armor's 5th constituency =

Constituency of the National Assembly of France

5th constituency of the Côtes-d'Armor
- inline Constituency of the National Assembly of France

- Constituency in department

- Côtes-d'Armor in France
- Deputy: Éric Bothorel; RE
- Department: Côtes-d'Armor
- Cantons: Etables-sur-Mer, Lannion, Lézardrieux, Paimpol, Perros-Guirec, Plouha, Pontrieux, La Roche-Derrien, Tréguier

The 5th constituency of the Côtes-d'Armor is a French legislative constituency in the Côtes-d'Armor département. Like the other 576 French constituencies, it elects one MP using the two-round system, with a run-off if no candidate receives over 50% of the vote in the first round.

== Historic representation ==
Election	Member	Party
1988	Pierre-Yvon Trémel	PS
1993	Yvon Bonnot	UDF
1997	Alain Gouriou	PS
2002	Alain Gouriou	PS
2007	Corinne Erhel	PS
2012	Corinne Erhel	PS
2017	Éric Bothorel	LREM
2022	Éric Bothorel	LREM
2024	Éric Bothorel	RE

== Election results ==
=== 2024 ===
Candidate	Party	Alliance	First round			Second round		
Candidate	Party	Alliance	Votes	%	+/–	Votes	%	+/–
Eric Bothorel	RE	Ensemble	29,479	37.81	+6.88	32,463	41.21	-11.28
Marielle Lemaitre	LFI	NFP	23,858	30.60	+4.16	23,385	29.69	-17.82
Jean-Yves Le Boulanger	RN		22,668	29.08	+15.74	22,919	29.10	new
Yann Guéguen	LO		1,953	2.51	+1.70			
Votes			77,958	100.00		78,767	100.00	
Valid votes			77,958	96.59	-1.58	78,767	97.04	+4.31
Blank votes			1,784	2.21	+0.90	1,725	2.13	-2.74
Null votes			971	1.20	+0.68	679	0.84	-1.56
Turnout			80,713	74.90	+18.23	81,171	75.33	+19.08
Abstentions			27,048	25.10	-18.23	26,586	24.67	-19.08
Registered voters			107,761			107,757		
Result			RE HOLD					

=== 2022 ===
Legislative Election 2022: Côtes-d'Armor's 5th constituency
Party	Candidate	Votes	%	±%
LREM (Ensemble)	Éric Bothorel	18,543	30.93	-10.14
LFI (NUPÉS)	Marie-Amélie Troadec	15,851	26.44	-2.53
RN	Sandrine Castek	7,999	13.34	+5.36
PS	Vincent Le Meaux*	6,144	10.25	N/A
LR (UDC)	Yves Jezequel	4,038	6.74	−9.30
REC	Bernard Germain	1,965	3.28	N/A
DVE	Sylvie Gioux	1,900	3.17	N/A
Others	N/A	3,502	5.84	
Turnout		59,942	56.67	−1.39
2nd round result
LREM (Ensemble)	Éric Bothorel	29,496	52.49	-13.92
LFI (NUPÉS)	Marie-Amélie Troadec	26,697	47.51	N/A
Turnout		56,193	56.25	+7.41
LREM hold				

* PS dissident

=== 2017 ===
Candidate	Label	First round		Second round	
Candidate	Label	Votes	%	Votes	%
Éric Bothorel	REM	24,257	41.07	29,236	66.41
Jean-Yves de Chaisemartin	UDI	9,470	16.04	14,788	33.59
Marie-Amélie Troadec	FI	7,977	13.51		
Éric Robert	PS	5,122	8.67		
Annick Lebiez	FN	4,710	7.98		
Yves Nedellec	ECO	2,689	4.55		
Trefina Kerrain	REG	1,371	2.32		
Benoît Dumont	PCF	1,325	2.24		
Marie-Pierre Lecat	DVD	516	0.87		
Marie-Françoise Le Ray	DIV	452	0.77		
Yann Gueguen	EXG	445	0.75		
Jean-Marc Le Luyer	REG	392	0.66		
Hervé Chuberre	EXG	236	0.40		
Guillaume Folcher	DIV	96	0.16		
Votes		59,058	100.00	44,024	100.00
Valid votes		59,058	98.04	44,024	86.87
Blank votes		818	1.36	4,675	9.23
Null votes		364	0.60	1,977	3.90
Turnout		60,240	58.06	50,676	48.84
Abstentions		43,523	41.94	53,076	51.16
Registered voters		103,763		103,752	
Source: Ministry of the Interior

=== 2012 ===
2012 legislative election in Cotes-D'Armor's 5th constituency
Candidate	Party	First round		Second round	
Candidate	Party	Votes	%	Votes	%
Corinne Erhel	PS	29,465	46.19%	39,319	63.97%
Xavier Lec'Hvien	UMP	16,610	26.04%	22,142	36.03%
Jeanne-Marie Fernagut	FN	6,126	9.60%		
Claudine Fejean	PCF (FG)	4,986	7.82%		
Marie-Pascale Martin	EELV	3,750	5.88%		
Philippe Coulau	UDB	1,388	2.18%		
Katell Rivoal	NPA	426	0.67%		
Claude Guillemain	JB (BNAFET)	419	0.66%		
Yann Guéguen	LO	373	0.58%		
Denis Moulin	POI	252	0.40%		
Valid votes		63,795	98.23%	61,461	96.76%
Spoilt and null votes		1,148	1.77%	2,055	3.24%
Votes cast / turnout		64,943	63.45%	63,516	61.47%
Abstentions		37,410	36.55%	39,820	38.53%
Registered voters		102,353	100.00%	103,336	100.00%

=== 2007 ===
Legislative Election 2007: Côtes-d'Armor's 5th constituency
Party	Candidate	Votes	%	±%
UMP	Marie-Dominique Furet	22,778	34.16	
PS	Corinne Erhel	22,365	33.54	
MoDem	Jean-Yves de Chaisemartin	7,312	10.97	
LV	Isabelle Metayer	3,298	4.95	
PCF	Claudine Fejean	2,936	4.40	
LCR	Thibaud Saint-Michel	1,994	2.99	
FN	Catherine Genie	1,640	2.46	
REG	Philippe Coulau	1,465	2.20	
Others	N/A	2,877	-	
Turnout		67,737	66.56	
2nd round result
PS	Corinne Erhel	38,294	56.08	
UMP	Marie-Dominique Furet	29,994	43.92	
Turnout		69,818	68.62	
PS hold				

=== 2002 ===
Legislative Election 2002: Côtes-d'Armor's 5th constituency
Party	Candidate	Votes	%	±%
PS	Alain Gouriou	23,971	36.13	
UMP	Jacques Saleün	22,368	33.72	
DVD	Gabriel Lopez	4,776	7.20	
FN	Monique Ferrer	3,890	5.86	
LV	Isabelle Metayer	2,933	4.42	
PCF	Claudine Féjean	2,324	3.50	
REG	Pierre Morvan	1,477	2.23	
Others	N/A	4,601	-	
Turnout		67,500	69.22	
2nd round result
PS	Alain Gouriou	33,266	50.92	
UMP	Jacques Saleün	32,059	49.08	
Turnout		67,251	68.97	
PS hold				

=== 1997 ===
Legislative Election 1997: Côtes-d'Armor's 5th constituency
Party	Candidate	Votes	%	±%
FD (UDF)	Yvon Bonnot	21,166	34.37	
PS	Alain Gouriou	19,127	31.06	
PCF	Alain Prigent	6,102	9.91	
FN	Jean-Luc de Trogoff	5,429	8.82	
REG	Pierre Morvan	1,921	3.12	
LO	Alain Le Fol	1,838	2.98	
LV	Alain Ernoult	1,730	2.81	
Others	N/A	4,267	-	
Turnout		61,580	69.33	
2nd round result
PS	Alain Gouriou	36,657	54.63	
FD (UDF)	Yvon Bonnot	30,446	45.37	
Turnout		69,869	75.47	
PS gain from FD				

== Sources ==
- Official results of French elections from 1998: "Résultats électoraux officiels en France" (in French). Archived from the original on 20 December 2011.
