= Jean Bardet =

French politician (1941–2026)

Member of the National Assembly of France
- In office 2 April 1993 – 19 June 2012
- Constituency: Val-d'Oise's 3rd constituency
- In office 1 October 1986 – 14 May 1988
- Constituency: Val-d'Oise

Personal details
- Born: 22 June 1941 Paris, German-occupied France
- Died: 5 November 2026 (aged 85)
- Party: Union for a Popular Movement

Jean Bardet (22 June 1941 – 5 November 2026) was a French politician who served as a member of the National Assembly of France. He represented the Val-d'Oise department, and was a member of the Union for a Popular Movement. Bardet died on 5 November 2026, at the age of 85.
