= Radical Party of the Left =

Radical Party of the Left Parti radical de Gauche
- Abbreviation: PRG
- President: Guillaume Lacroix
- Founder: Maurice Faure
- Founded: 1971; 55 years ago (GEARS); 1972; 54 years ago (MGRS); 1973; 53 years ago (MRG); 1994; 32 years ago (Radical); 1996; 30 years ago (PRS); 1998; 28 years ago (PRG); 2019; 7 years ago (PRG, refoundation)
- Dissolved: 9 December 2017; 8 years ago (1998 PRG)
- Split from: Radical Party; Radical Movement (2019 PRG)
- Merged into: Radical Movement (majority)
- Headquarters: 3, Avenue Constant Coquelin; F - 75007, Paris
- Youth wing: Young Radicals of the Left
- Membership (2022): 3,500
- Ideology: Social liberalism Radicalism
- Political position: Centre-left
- European Parliament group: ERA (1994–1999); S&D (2014–2017)
- Colours: Yellow Blue
- National Assembly: 0 / 577
- Senate: 4 / 348
- European Parliament: 0 / 79
- Presidency of Regional Councils: 0 / 17
- Presidency of Departmental Councils: 2 / 95

Website
- www.partiradicaldegauche.fr

The Radical Party of the Left (French: Parti radical de gauche [paʁti ʁadikal də ɡoʃ], PRG) is a social-liberal political party in France. A party in the Radical tradition, since 1972 the PRG has been a close ally of the major party of the centre-left in France, the Socialist Party (French: Parti socialiste, PS). After the 2017 presidential and legislative elections, negotiations to merge the PRG with the Radical Party (from which the PRG emerged in 1972) began and the refounding congress to reunite the parties into the Radical Movement was held on 9 and 10 December 2017. However, a faction of ex-PRG members, including its last president Sylvia Pinel, split from the Radical Movement in February 2019 due to its expected alliance with La République En Marche in the European elections and resurrected the PRG.

== History ==
The party was formed in 1972 by a split from the Republican, Radical, and Radical-Socialist Party, once the dominant party of the French Left. It was founded by Radicals who opposed Jean-Jacques Servan-Schreiber's centrist direction. They chose to join the Union of the Left and agreed to the Common Programme signed by the Socialist Party (PS) and the French Communist Party (PCF). At that time, the party was known as the Movement of the Radical Socialist Left (French: Mouvement de la gauche radicale-socialiste, MGRS), then as the Movement of Radicals of the Left (French: Mouvement des Radicaux de Gauche, MRG) after 1973.

Led by Robert Fabre during the 1970s, the party was the third partner of the Union of the Left. Nevertheless, its electoral influence did not compare with those of its two allies, which competed for the leadership over the left. Robert Fabre sought to attract left-wing Gaullists to the party and gradually became close to President Valéry Giscard d'Estaing, who nominated him as Mediator of the Republic in 1978. He and his followers were excluded from the party by those who strongly supported the alliance with the PS.

Michel Crépeau was nominated by the party for the 1981 presidential election and obtained a disappointing 2.09% in the first round. He and his party in the runoff endorsed PS candidate François Mitterrand, who eventually won. The MRG won 14 seats in the subsequent 1981 legislative election and participated in PS-led governments between 1981 and 1986 and again between 1988 and 1993.

In the 1984 European elections, the MRG formed a common list with Brice Lalonde's environmentalists and Olivier Stirn, a centre-right deputy. The list styled as the Radical and Ecologist Agreement won 3.32%, but no seats. The party resumed its customary alliance with the PS in the 1986 legislative election and supported President Mitterrand's 1988 reelection bid by the first round.

At the beginning of the 1990s, under the leadership of the popular businessman Bernard Tapie the party benefited from an ephemeral upswing in its popularity while the governing SP was in disarray. The list led by Tapie won 12.03% and 13 seats of the votes in the 1994 European Parliament election. However, Tapie retired from politics due to his legal problems and the party, renamed the Radical Socialist Party (French: Parti radical-socialiste, PRS), returned to its lowest ebb.

After the Radical Party opened legal proceedings against the PRS, it was forced to change its name to the Radical Party of the Left (French: Parti radical de gauche, PRG). Between 1997 and 2002, it was a junior partner in Lionel Jospin's Plural Left coalition government. In the 2002 presidential election, the PRG nominated its own candidate, former MEP and French Guiana deputy Christiane Taubira, for the first time since 1981. However, some members of the party including Émile Zuccarelli and PRG senator Nicolas Alfonsi supported Jean-Pierre Chevènement's candidacy. Taubira won 2.32% of the vote. Taubira gave her name to the 2001 law which declared the Atlantic slave trade a crime against humanity.

In the 2007 presidential election, while the party supported the PS candidate Ségolène Royal, Bernard Tapie, who had been a leading figure in the PRG, supported Nicolas Sarkozy. In the 2007 legislative election, the party won eight seats, including a seat in French Guiana (Taubira) and Saint-Pierre-et-Miquelon.

The party split on Nicolas Sarkozy's constitutional reforms in 2008. Six deputies (Gérard Charasse, Paul Giacobbi, Annick Girardin, Joël Giraud, Dominique Orliac and Sylvia Pinel) and three senators (Jean-Michel Baylet, André Boyer and François Vendasi) opted to vote in favour, hence allowing for its passage.

The PRG's then-president Jean-Michel Baylet ran in the 2011 SP presidential primaries, the only non-PS candidate in the field, but was placed last with only 0.64% of the vote in the primary. The PRG supported François Hollande, the eventual winner of the primaries and the 2012 presidential election. In the 2012 legislative election, the PRG won 12 seats. With four additional members, it formed its own parliamentary group in the National Assembly, the Radical, Republican, Democratic and Progressive group.

Although the PRG remained a close and loyal ally of the PS, it has also cooperated with the small Ecology Generation (GE) party since December 2011.

In the 2014 European elections, the party received 13.98% of the vote on a joint list with the PS, electing one MEP Virginie Rozière, who joined the Progressive Alliance of Socialists and Democrats (S&D) group with PS MEPs.

In the 2017 SP presidential primary, PRG candidate Sylvia Pinel received 2% of the vote in the first round election held on 22 January 2017. In the 2017 French legislative election, the party only re-elected three MPs; Annick Girardin, Jeanine Dubié and Sylvia Pinel.

In 2019, the party was relaunched.

The party supported Christiane Taubira in the 2022 French presidential election.

Following the 2022 French legislative election, the party's only deputy is Olivier Falorni representing Charente-Maritime's 1st constituency. He was elected in 2022 with 66.11% of the (second-round) vote in that constituency, and re-elected in 2024 with 74.71%. The PRG was the only centre-left party on the French mainland with representation in the National Assembly to refuse to join the leftist electoral coalition NUPES, headed by Jean-Luc Mélenchon, and in 2024 it formed part of Emmanuel Macron's Ensemble coalition.

== Ideology ==
The PRG advocates social liberalism, classical radicalism, secularism to its French extent known as laïcité, progressivism, European federalism, and individual freedom; it differs from the social democrats of the Socialist Party mainly by its strong attachment to private property.

The party was a member of the European Liberal Democrat and Reform Party before 2012.

== Factions ==
Under Baylet, the PRG's party line was centre-left, socially liberal and pro-European. Nevertheless, there were internal divisions in the party. Former cabinet minister and former deputy Émile Zuccarelli is a left-wing republican who strongly opposed Corsican nationalism and supported the no vote in the 2005 European constitutional referendum, positions much closer to Jean-Pierre Chevènement's Citizen and Republican Movement (MRC). Similarly, Christiane Taubira supported the no vote in 2005 and endorsed Arnaud Montebourg rather than Baylet in the 2011 primary.

== Elected officials ==
- Current Deputies: Olivier Falorni (Charente-Maritime 1)
- Former Ministers: Annick Girardin, Jacques Mézard
- Former Deputies: Stéphane Claireaux (Saint Pierre et Miquelon), (Note: replacing Annick Girardin while she is a cabinet minister) Jeanine Dubié (Hautes-Pyrénées), Sylvia Pinel (Tarn-et-Garonne)
- Senators (RDSE group): Joseph Castelli (Haute-Corse), Yvon Collin (Tarn-et-Garonne), Philippe Esnol (Yvelines), François Fortassin (Hautes-Pyrénées), Françoise Laborde (Haute-Garonne), Jacques Mézard (Cantal), Jean-Claude Requier (Lot)

== Popular support ==
The PRG remained rather weak on its own electorally, averaging around 2% of the vote (2002 presidential candidate Christiane Taubira won 2.32% of the vote); which explains why the party depended on its stronger ally, the PS for support and parliamentary representation. Almost all of the party's deputies and local officials were elected with no official PS opposition. It retained some support among middle class voters and in traditional Radical areas in the South West.

The major exception was in Corsica, where the party was historically the largest party on the non-nationalist French Left and remains so to its time of dissolution due to a tradition of political dynasties (such as the Giacobbi family) and the weak infrastructure of the PS on the island. Paul Giacobbi represented Haute-Corse in the National Assembly until he stood down at the 2017 elections (Émile Zuccarelli, an internal rival of Giacobbi and current mayor of Bastia, also represented the island in Paris until his 2007 defeat) and Senators Nicolas Alfonsi and François Vendasi represented the Corsican PRG in the Senate. Giacobbi is also President of the General Council of Haute-Corse.

In metropolitan France, the PRG was able to sustain a long-lasting Radical tradition dating back to the French Third Republic, most notably in the southwest or departments such as the Eure-et-Loir and Eure.

The party was represented overseas in French Guiana by Taubira's Walwari, one of the major parties of the local left.

=== Presidential elections ===
President of the French Republic
| Election | Candidate | First round | | Second round | | Result |
| Election | Candidate | Votes | % | Votes | % | Result |
|---|---|---|---|---|---|---|
| 1981 | Michel Crépeau | 642,847 | 2.21% | - | - | Lost |
| 2002 | Christiane Taubira | 660,447 | 2.32% | - | - | Lost |

=== Legislative elections ===
French National Assembly
| Election year | No. of first round votes | % of first round vote | No. of seats | Swing |
|---|---|---|---|---|
| 1973 | Classified as PS | | 13 / 490 | New |
| 1978 | 603,932 | 2.11% | 10 / 491 | ▼ −3 |
| 1981 | Classified as PS | | 14 / 491 | ▲ +4 |
| 1986 | 107,769 | 0.38% | 7 / 577 (Note: Including 5 elected on PS-MRG lists in various departments.) | ▼ −7 |
| 1988 | 272,316 | 1.11% | 9 / 575 | ▲ +2 |
| 1993 | Classified as PS or DVG | | 6 / 577 | ▼ −3 |
| 1997 | 389,782 | 1.53% | 12 / 577 | ▲ +6 |
| 2002 | 388,891 | 1.54% | 7 / 577 | ▼ −5 |
| 2007 | 343,565 | 1.32% | 7 / 577 | Steady |
| 2012 | 429,059 | 1.65% | 12 / 577 | ▲ +5 |
| 2017 | 106,311 | 0.47% | 3 / 577 | ▼ −9 |
| 2022 | 126,689 | 0.56% | 1 / 577 | ▼ −2 |

=== European Parliament ===
| Election | Leader | Votes | % | Seats | +/− | EP Group |
|---|---|---|---|---|---|---|
| 1979 (Note: Run in a joint list with PS, that won 22 seats in total.) | François Mitterrand | 4,763,026 | 23.53 (#2) | 2 / 81 | New | SOC |
| 1984 (Note: Run in a joint list with Ecologists and UCR, that won no seats.) | Olivier Stirn | 670,474 | 3.32 (#6) | 0 / 81 | ▼2 | − |
| 1989 (Note: Run in a joint list with PS, that won 22 seats in total.) | Laurent Fabius | 4,286,354 | 23.61 (#2) | 2 / 81 | ▲2 | SOC |
| 1994 | Bernard Tapie | 2,344,457 | 12.03 (#4) | 13 / 87 | ▲11 | ERA |
| 1999 (Note: Run in a joint list with PS and MDC, that won 22 seats in total.) | François Hollande | 3,873,901 | 21.95 (#1) | 2 / 87 | ▼11 | PES |
| 2004 | Jean-Michel Baylet | 121,573 | 0.71 (#14) | 0 / 78 | ▼2 | − |
| 2009 | Did not contest | | | 0 / 74 | 0 | − |
| 2014 (Note: Run in a joint list with PS, that won 13 seats in total.) | Jean-Christophe Cambadélis | 2,650,357 | 13.98 (#2) | 1 / 74 | ▲1 | S&D |
| 2019 (Note: Run in a joint list with PS, PP and ND, that won 6 seats in total.) | Raphaël Glucksmann | 1,403,170 | 6.19 (#6) | 0 / 79 | ▼1 | − |
| 2024 (Note: Run in a joint list with R&PS, Volt, MDP, MDC and CSDR, that won no seats.) | Guillaume Lacroix | 63,006 | 0.26 (#17) | 0 / 79 | 0 | − |

== Leadership ==
Party presidents:

- Robert Fabre (1972–1978)
- Michel Crépeau (1978–1981)
- Roger-Gérard Schwartzenberg (1981–1983)
- Jean-Michel Baylet (1983–1985)
- François Doubin (1985–1988)
- Yvon Collin (1988–1989)
- Émile Zuccarelli (1989–1992)
- Jean-François Hory (1992–1996)
- Jean-Michel Baylet (1996–2016)
- Sylvia Pinel (2016–2017)
- Guillaume Lacroix (2019–present)

== See also ==
- European Radical Alliance
- French Left
- Liberalism and radicalism in France
- Classical radicalism
- Sinistrisme
