= Éric Bothorel =

French politician (born 1966)

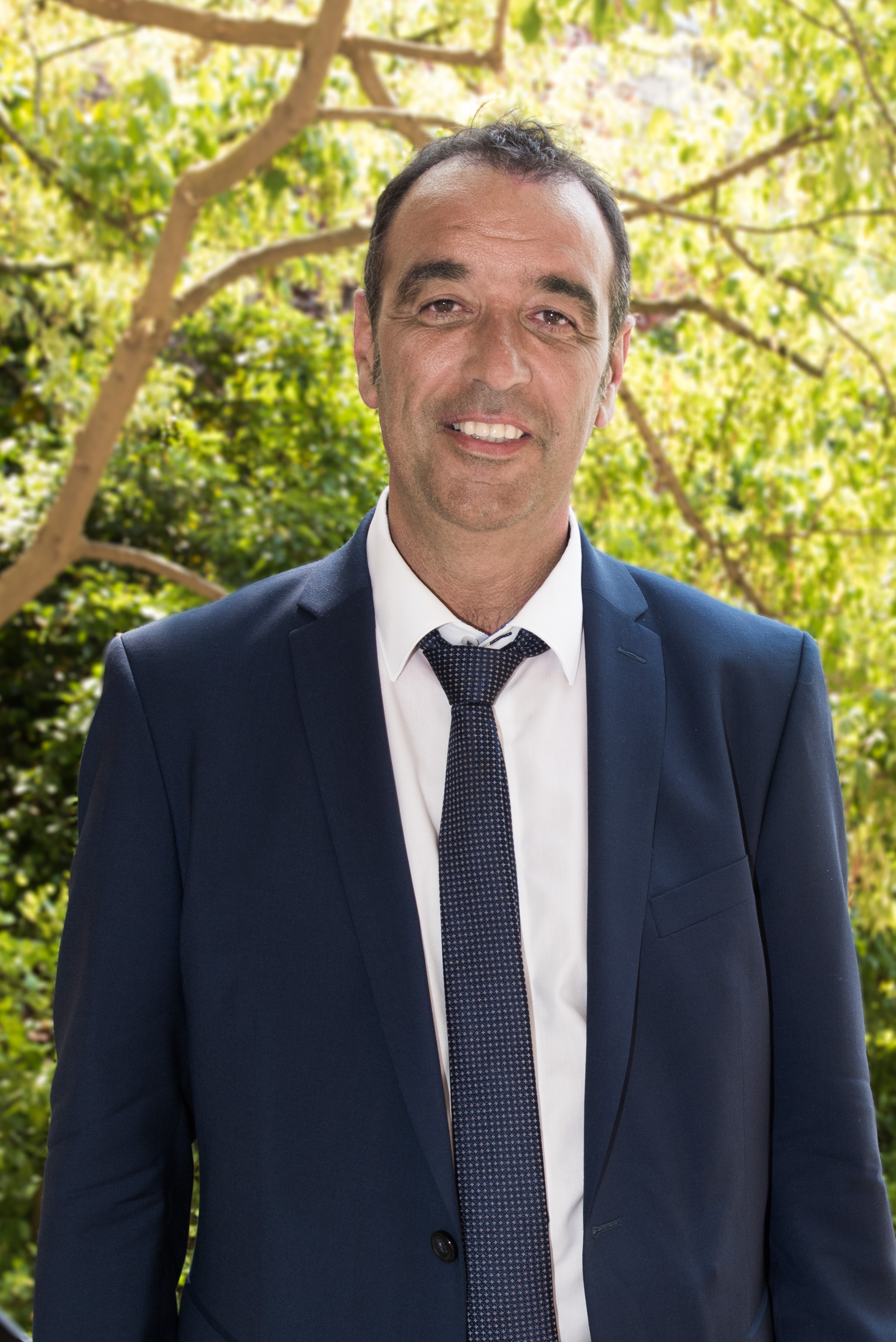

Member of the National Assembly for Côtes-d'Armor's 5th constituency
- Incumbent
- Assumed office 5 May 2017
- Preceded by: Corinne Erhel

Personal details
- Born: 20 October 1966 (age 59) Paimpol, France
- Party: Renaissance

Éric Bothorel (born 20 October 1966) is a French politician of Renaissance (RE) who has been serving as a member of the French National Assembly since the 2017 elections, representing the department of Côtes-d'Armor.

== Political career ==
In parliament, Bothorel serves as member of the Committee on Economic Affairs and Education and the Committee on European Affairs. In addition to his committee assignments, he is part of the parliamentary friendship groups with Iraq and Somalia.

In November 2018, Bothorel co-authored (with Marietta Karamanli) a parliamentary report on digital taxation. Later that year, he co-chaired (with Marie Guévenoux) a group of some twenty parliamentarians involved in organizing a nation-wide consultation process in response to the Yellow vests movement.

== Political positions ==
=== Foreign policy ===
In April 2018, Bothorel joined other co-signatories around Sébastien Nadot in officially filing a request for a commission of inquiry into the legality of French weapons sales to the Saudi-led coalition fighting in Yemen, days before an official visit of Saudi Crown Prince Mohammed bin Salman to Paris.

In July 2019, Bothorel voted in favor of the French ratification of the European Union’s Comprehensive Economic and Trade Agreement (CETA) with Canada.

=== Domestic policy ===
In May 2018, Bothorel co-sponsored an initiative in favour of a bioethics law extending to homosexual and single women free access to fertility treatments such as in vitro fertilisation (IVF) under France's national health insurance; it was one of the campaign promises of President Emmanuel Macron and marked the first major social reform of his five-year term.

Along with four other LREM members – Cécile Rilhac, Jean-Michel Mis, Stéphane Trompille, and Coralie Dubost –, Bothorel disassociated himself from their colleague Aurore Bergé when the latter announced her intention in October 2019 to vote for a Republican draft law banning the wearing of the hijab by women accompanying groups of students on school outings.

Amid efforts to contain the COVID-19 pandemic in France, Bothorel was one of the early supporters of the government's proposal for a state-supported “StopCovid” contact-tracing app project.

In 2020, Bothorel was one of ten LREM members who voted against his parliamentary group's majority and opposed a much discussed security bill drafted by his colleagues Alice Thourot and Jean-Michel Fauvergue that helps, among other measures, curtail the filming of police forces.

== See also ==
- 2017 French legislative election
