= François Vendasi =

French politician (1940–2022)

François Vendasi (24 June 1940 – 21 November 2022) was a French politician who was a member of the Senate, representing the Haute-Corse department. He was a member of the Radical Party of the Left. Vendasi died on 21 November 2022, at the age of 82.

== Sources ==
- Page on the Senate website (in French)
