= Republican and Socialist Left =

Republican and Socialist Left Gauche républicaine et socialiste
- Abbreviation: GRS
- National co-facilitators: Emmanuel Maurel; Bastien Faudot
- National co-coordinators: Marie-Noëlle Lienemann; Jean-Luc Laurent
- Assembly leader: Stéphane Peu
- Founded: 19 October 2018; 8 years ago
- Split from: Socialist Party
- Headquarters: 3, Avenue de Corbera; 75012 Paris
- Ideology: Socialism; Eco-socialism
- Political position: Centre-left to left-wing
- National affiliation: Federation of the Republican Left (2022–present); New Popular Front (2024–present)
- European Parliament group: The Left in the European Parliament – GUE/NGL
- Colors: Red, cyan and violet
- National Assembly: 1 / 577
- Senate: 0 / 348
- European Parliament: 0 / 81

The Republican and Socialist Left (French: Gauche républicaine et socialiste, GRS) is a socialist political party in France. It was founded on 3 February 2019 after the merger of the Alternative for a Republican, Ecologist and Socialist Program (APRÉS) and the Citizen and Republican Movement (MRC) of Jean-Luc Laurent and Jean-Pierre Chevènement. APRÉS had been founded in October 2018 by Emmanuel Maurel and Marie-Noëlle Lienemann after their departure from the Socialist Party and was close to La France Insoumise.

== History ==
Logo of Alternative for a Republican, Ecologist and Socialist Movement

=== Alternative for a Republican, Ecologist and Socialist Movement ===
The Alternative for a Republican, Ecologist and Socialist Movement (APRÉS) had 650 to 1 000 members. These included politician Gaëtan Gorce, Christophe Premat and political researcher Rémi Lefebvre, who signed a call that initiated the merger of the party with the MRC into a new political organization, whose founding congress took place on 2 and 3 February 2019.

After splitting from the Socialist Party (PS), APRÉS formed a "new Popular Front" with La France Insoumise (LFI) to present a joint electoral list for the 2019 European Parliament elections. Emmanuel Maurel described the elections as the "first step" in the alliance between the two parties.

Three weeks after the merger, the leaders of the new party announced that one thousand former members of the PS had joined them.

=== Republican and Socialist Left ===
The MRC, led by Jean-Luc Laurent and founded by Jean-Pierre Chevènement, supported the APRÉS call for a merger. It also participated in the alliance with La France Insoumise in the 2019 European Parliament elections. During a party congress from 1 to 2 December 2018, 73.5% of members voted to create a "new political formation" with APRÉS in 2019 that would be the "home of the republican left."

The two parties merged on 3 February 2019 at a Founding Conference in Valence to establish the Republican and Socialist Left (GRS), with Maurel and former MRC spokesman Bastien Faudot as the first co-presidents. The party's name was chosen by its supporters from a list of proposals including the New Republican and Socialist Party, Our Common Causes and Ecologist and Socialist Republicans.

During the 2019 European Parliament elections in France, the GRS joined Now the People, an electoral list led by Manon Aubry of La France Insoumise. The GRS's candidates on the list included Maurel, Catherine Coutard, Anthony Gratacos and Nouvelle-Aquitaine regional councillor Elisabeth Jutel. Maurel, who was in sixth place on the list, was re-elected in the elections.

The GRS opened its first "university" for political education in September 2019 in Rochefort, Charente-Maritime.

On 21 and 22 November 2020, the GRS joined the Radicals of the Left (LRDG), Republic and Socialism, Common Causes and the Party of the European Left in organizing the Universities of the Republican Left (UGR) by teleconference. The opening of the Universities was attended by several prominent left-wing figures, such as Arnaud Montebourg, Yannick Jadot, Fabien Roussel and François Ruffin.

In January 2021, the GRS began to develop its party platform for the 2022 French presidential election. The first draft of the platform was open to amendments by party members from June to September 2021. It was then debated by the UGR at an in-person event in the Docks des Suds in Marseille on from 24 to 26 December 2021; the event was organized by the same political groups as in 2020. Political figures in attendance included LFI Member of the European Parliament (MEP) and co-president of The Left in the European Parliament Manon Aubry, essayist Jacques Rigaudiat, former secretary-general of the Syndicat de la Magistrature union Hélène Franco, former Greek foreign minister Georgios Katrougalos, Europe Ecology – The Greens MEP Marie Toussaint, secretary-general of the LFI delegation to the European Parliament Marina Mesure and Génération.s candidate in Provence-Alpes-Côte d'Azur Capucine Edou. The morning of 26 December was dedicated to voting on amendments and the platform as a whole in a debate presided over by LRDG secretary-general Isabelle Amaglio and GRS secretary-general Anthony Gratacos. The platform was finalized by the end of the UGR, and the GRS began preparing its electoral campaign for the spring 2022 election campaign.

With the 2022 presidential election approaching, the GRS organized a vote among its members to select a candidate. Four candidates were on the ballot: Yannick Jadot, Jean-Luc Mélenchon, Arnaud Montebourg and Fabien Roussel. Of the 4 217 party members, 2 445 voted in an 20 and 21 October 2021 online election where Montebourg won with 56.97% of the vote. Accordingly, the GRS began to campaign for Montebourg on 22 October, until he withdrew from the presidential race on 19 January 2022. The party subsequently announced its support for Roussel and his French Communist Party (PCF) instead.

== Criticism ==
The GRS has been criticized by figures in the Socialist Party, which it split from. The first secretary of the PS, Olivier Faure, described the defection of APRÉS' founders as "individual choices" and rejected Emmanuel Maurel's political stances, saying that "We have never taken that lane, the populist lane. If we had followed it, we would have never abolished the death penalty."

Laurent Baumel, a former Member of the National Assembly, Socialist frondeur dissident and member of Maurel's Union and Hope movement, refused to have "the entire left wing [rally to] Jean-Luc Mélenchon" and stayed in the PS.

== Membership ==
=== Legislators ===
- Emmanuel Maurel, Member of the European Parliament (The Left in the European Parliament – GUE/NGL) and national co-facilitator of the GRS
- Marie-Noëlle Lienemann, Senator (Communist, Republican, Citizen and Ecologist group) and national co-coordinator of the GRS
- Caroline Fiat, Member of the National Assembly for Meurthe-et-Moselle (La France Insoumise group)

=== Other elected officials and prominent members ===
- Jean-Luc Laurent, mayor of Le Kremlin-Bicêtre, Val-de-Marne, former Member of the National Assembly, president of the MRC and national co-coordinator of the GRS
- Sophie Camard, mayor of the First Sector of Marseille since 2020
- Bastien Faudot, departmental councillor of the Territoire de Belfort and national co-facilitator of the GRS
- Catherine Coutard, municipal councillor of Montémilar, Drôme, vice-president of the MRC and GRS training division facilitator
- Gaëtan Gorce, former Socialist senator and Member of the National Assembly for Nièvre
- Marc Vuillemot, president of the Cities and Suburbs Mayors' Association of France and former mayor of La Seyne-sur-Mer, Var
- Rémi Lefebvre, political scientist
- Christophe Premat, former Socialist Member of the National Assembly for French citizens overseas

== Electoral results ==
In the 2019 European Parliament elections, the GRS formed an alliance with La France Insoumise. National co-facilitator Emmanuel Maurel was elected as part of the six winning candidates from the alliance's list.

Election	Leader	Votes	%	Seats	+/−	EP Group
2019	With LFI			1 / 79	New	The Left
2024 (Note: Run in a joint list with PCF, PCR, PCM and HeD, that won no seats.)	Léon Deffontaines	584,020	2.36 (#8)	0 / 81	▼1	−
