= Corinne Erhel =

French politician (1967–2017)

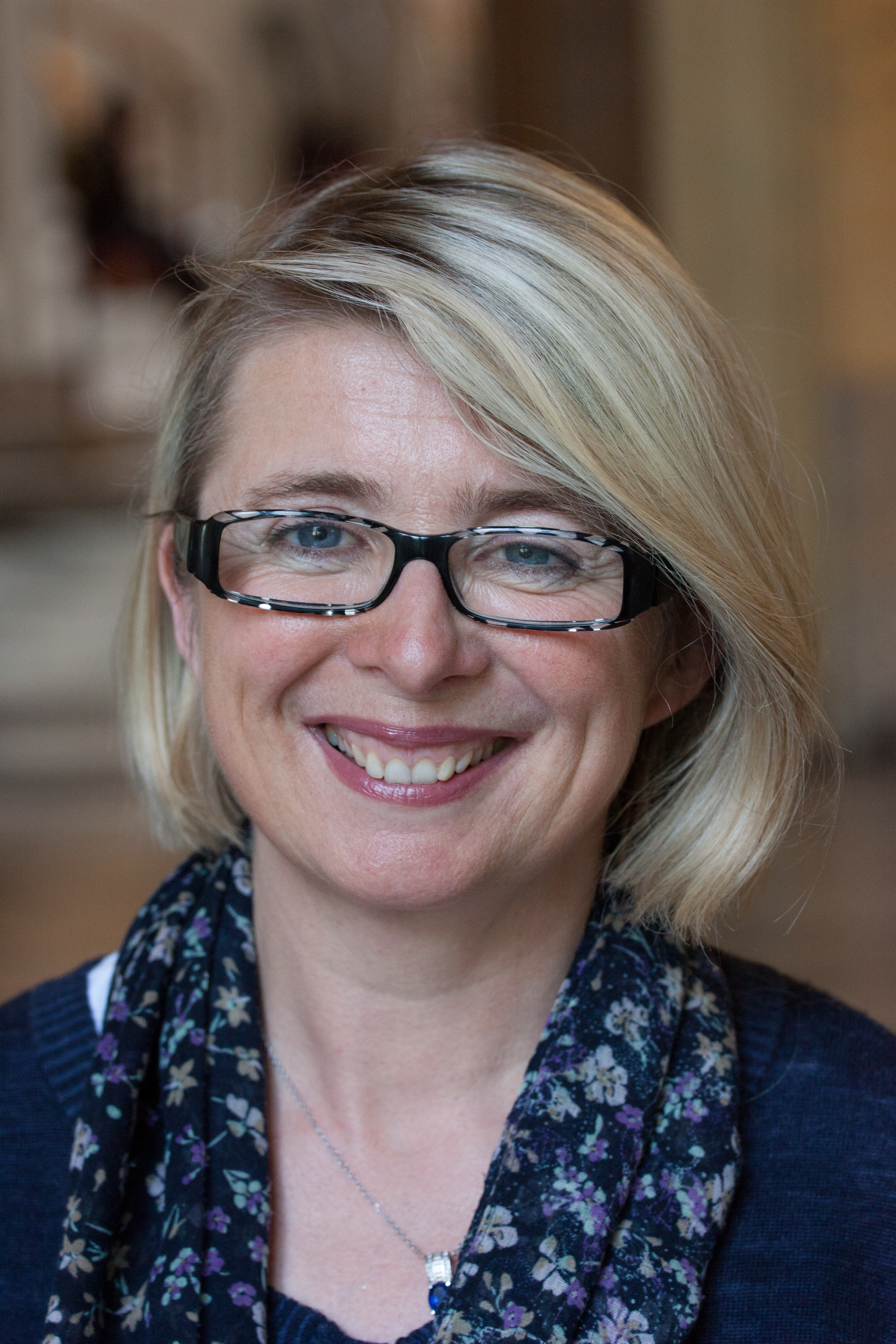
- Corinne Erhel in 2012

Member of the National Assembly for Côtes-d'Armor's 5th constituency
- In office 20 June 2007 – 5 May 2017
- Preceded by: Alain Gouriou
- Succeeded by: Éric Bothorel

Member of the Regional council of Brittany
- In office 29 March 2004 – 5 May 2017
- President: Jean-Yves Le Drian; Pierrick Massiot

Personal details
- Born: 3 February 1967 Quimper, France
- Died: 5 May 2017 (aged 50) Saint-Brieuc, France
- Party: Socialist Party; La République En Marche!

Corinne Erhel (3 February 1967 – 5 May 2017) was a French politician who served as a member of the National Assembly from 2007 to 2017, representing the Côtes-d'Armor department.

== Early life ==
Corinne Erhel was born on 3 February 1967 in Quimper, Finistère. She graduated from the institute of advanced studies of rural law and agricultural economics (IHEDREA).

== Career ==
Erhel joined the Socialist Party. In 1997, she became assistant parliamentarian for Alain Gouriou, deputy mayor of Lannion. In 2004 she was elected regional advisor for Brittany.

Erhel served as a member of the National Assembly from 2007 to 2017.

== Death ==
On 5 May 2017, Erhel died after collapsing while she was giving a speech at a meeting in support of Emmanuel Macron for the 2017 French presidential election.
