= Mathilde Panot =

French politician (born 1989)

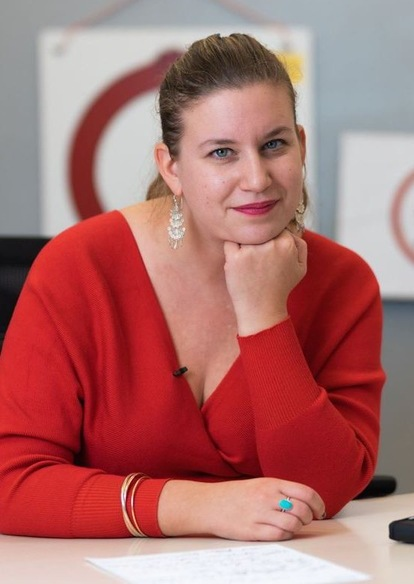
- Panot in 2020

President of the La France Insoumise group in the National Assembly
- Incumbent
- Assumed office 12 October 2021
- Preceded by: Jean-Luc Mélenchon

Member of the National Assembly for Val-de-Marne's 10th constituency
- Incumbent
- Assumed office 21 June 2017
- Preceded by: Jean-Luc Laurent

Personal details
- Born: 15 January 1989 (age 37) Tours, France
- Party: La France Insoumise
- Education: Sciences Po

Mathilde Françoise Panot (French pronunciation: [matild pano]; born 15 January 1989) is a French politician who has served as the president of the La France Insoumise group in the National Assembly since October 2021. She has also represented Val-de-Marne's 10th constituency in the National Assembly since 2017.

== Early life ==
Mathilde Françoise Panot was born in Tours, France on 15 January 1989. Her father was an agriculturist and her mother was a teacher. Panot spent her childhood and teenage years in Saint-Pryvé-Saint-Mesmin. After taking a year of preparatory classes in humanities and the social sciences in Orléans, she was admitted to Sciences Po, where she studied Franco-German relations at its campus in Nancy. Panot travelled to Germany in her third year at the university and attended political events held by Die Linke in Berlin. She also became an activist with the Union Nationale des Étudiants de France, the largest student union in France. Panot graduated from Sciences Po with a master's degree in international relations in 2013.

== Professional career ==
Panot began her career as a volunteer with the anti-poverty organization ATD Quart Monde at the age of 18 as part of a school project. She later described the work as a way of "constructively expressing her anger" at a "fucked up world that leaves people to die while they live in the world's fifth largest economy." Panot then became a team manager at the social enterprise VoisinMalin, working in the low-income housing estate of La Grande Borne in Grigny. There, she took part in community organizing on issues including breast cancer screening, postal banking and the elimination of bed bugs.

== Political career ==
=== Early political career ===
In 2006, Panot became involved in the nationwide movement protesting the First Employment Contract. She then received an offer to join the Left Front's office at Sciences Po for the 2012 French presidential election. Despite initially feeling like she did not belong in the party, Panot ultimately accepted the position. Following her graduation in 2013, Panot struggled to find a job due to her background in left-wing activism. She eventually accepted an offer from Left Front politician Danielle Simonnet to join her campaign for the Council of Paris in the 2014 municipal election.

=== Member of the National Assembly ===
Panot was elected to the National Assembly in Val-de-Marne's 10th constituency during the 2017 French legislative elections, defeating La République en Marche candidate Sheerazed Boulkroun with 52.2% of the vote. There, she became a member of the Sustainable Development, Spatial and Regional Planning Committee. In October 2017, Panot called for the creation of commissions of inquiry into public authorities' response to Hurricane Irma as well as France's role in the 1987 assassination of Thomas Sankara.

Panot is an advocate for "popular environmentalism" and led La France Insoumise's "Phase out nuclear for 100% renewables" campaign in 2018. In this role, she organized a nationwide poll on whether France should discontinue its use of nuclear power. The vote saw 314 530 individuals turn out online or at one of 2 000 in-person polling stations between 11 and 18 March 2018. 93 percent of respondents ultimately voted in favour of phasing out nuclear power, leading Panot to introduce a bill on the matter in the National Assembly.

Panot was the LFI candidate for president of the National Assembly following the appointment of incumbent François de Rugy to the second Philippe government, ultimately losing the election to Richard Ferrand on 12 September 2018. She also participated in a 2018 parliamentary inquiry into workplace safety at France's nuclear energy facilities, which found evidence of poor working conditions for the sector's 160 000 subcontractors. Panot introduced a bill to address this problem in September 2019. On 4 June 2019, she protested the National Assembly's reduction of speaking time and amendment rights for minority parties by gagging herself with a scarf at the Assembly rostrum.

Panot was unanimously elected the first vice-president of the La France Insoumise group in the National Assembly on 18 June 2019. In September, she launched a "citizens' commission of inquiry into alternative forest management practices" alongside Reporterre journalist Gaspard d'Allens. The commission's work culminated in a bill that would ban clearcutting of forested areas larger than two hectares. The legislation was introduced to the Assembly on 22 July 2020 and was co-sponsored by the Ecology Democracy Solidarity, Communist, Agir Ensemble and Liberties & Territories groups.

On 1 October 2019, Panot was arrested in Béjaïa, Algeria and removed to Algiers after meeting with local politicians and activists involved in Hirak. While rising to speak in the National Assembly on 2 February 2021, she was called a "fishwife" (poisonnière) by Renaissance deputy Pierre Henriet. Panot described the insult as "sexist abuse" and Henriet was subsequently fined a quarter of his parliamentary allowance for one month.

In 2021, Panot led a parliamentary inquiry on the consequences of private control of water resources in Guadeloupe, where one in four residents lack daily access to safe drinking water. She questioned the government on the situation on 29 June and presented the inquiry's final report on 15 July following its unanimous approval by the members of the investigatory commission. The online publication Blast praised the commission for its "considerable work" on the report but commented that it had still "failed to definitively answer the questions at hand, with each [actor responsible for the distribution of water in Guadeloupe] blaming the other" for the lack of safe drinking water. According to the regional financial court, the true culprit of the crisis was the Intercommunal Water and Sanitation Agency's "ludicrous" management of Guadeloupe's water resources. In December 2021, Panot and two other deputies brought the case in front of the Defender of Rights, alleging that the French state had "violated [Guadeloupeans'] right to water."

Panot also worked with several political, civil and labour organizations to hold a nationwide poll on enshrining the right to water and sanitation in the Constitution of France, protecting water resources and prohibiting their monopolization by multinational corporations in 2021. Of its 294 912 respondents, 99.61% voted in favour of the measures. A 2022 study by the environmentalist group Agir pour l'environnement ranked Panot and Delphine Batho as the deputies who voted most in favour of protecting the Earth and combating climate change during the 15th legislature. The report was publicized by several major media outlets but was also criticized for bias by L'Express.

=== President of the La France Insoumise group ===
Panot succeeded Jean-Luc Mélenchon as the president of the LFI group in the National Assembly on 12 October 2021, becoming the youngest deputy to ever lead a parliamentary group. In June 2022, she introduced a bill that would enshrine the right to abortion in the Constitution and pushed for the legislation alongside deputy Aurore Bergé and senators Mélanie Vogel and Laurence Rossignol. This goal was achieved when the Congress of the French Parliament ratified Article 34 of the Constitution in March 2024, which guarantees a woman's "freedom to voluntarily terminate her pregnancy."

During the 2022 French legislative elections, Panot was one of 15 candidates to win their races with an absolute majority of the vote in the first round. She was one of 11 La France Insoumise nominees to do so and recorded one of the highest vote shares in her party. Panot was also re-elected as president of the LFI parliamentary group and, in October 2022, named secretary of the party alongside national coordinator Manuel Bompard and treasurer Maxime Charpentier.

Following President Emmanuel Macron's dissolution of the National Assembly, Panot was re-elected as deputy in the 2024 French legislative elections with 59.27% of the vote in the first round.

== Controversies ==
Panot drew scrutiny for the salary she received as a member of the organization L'Ère du Peuple, with France Info reporting that she was paid €11 040 for 1 725 hours of work (about €2 208 per month). La France Insoumise, meanwhile, said she was paid "close to €40 000, all fees included, over nine months," with €87 150 worth of work being billed to Jean-Luc Mélenchon.

On 16 July 2022, the 80th anniversary of the Vel' d'Hiv Roundup, Panot posted a controversial tweet accusing Emmanuel Macron of "honouring" Philippe Pétain. She cited Macron paying homage to Pétain as a victorious general in the First World War in a 2018 speech as evidence for her claim. This was despite Macron later retracting his statements. Panot's tweet was criticized by politicians across the political spectrum, including figures from her own New Ecological and Social People's Union (NUPES), but she continued to stand by her words.

Following the October 7 attacks on Israel, Panot described Hamas as a "militant group that is today responsible for war crimes." Her statement was condemned by numerous politicians, again including those from the Socialist Party, La France Insoumise's NUPES coalition partner. One such critic was deputy Jérôme Guedj, who argued: "...by not naming Hamas as a terrorist group, but as an army that commits war crimes, LFI legitimizes Hamas and its actions. It also deliberately decides to isolate itself." It was not clear if Guedj would address the same criticisms to historians who described the German Wehrmacht during WWII as an army that committed war crimes on the eastern front.

On 23 April 2024, Panot was summoned by police investigating allegations of "apologia for terrorism" in a statement released by the LFI group in the National Assembly following the October 7 attacks. She later announced on 30 January 2025 that the case had been closed without further action.
