= Yvon Collin =

French politician

Yvon Collin (born 10 April 1944 in Montauban) is a former member of the Senate of France who served from 1988 to 2020. He represented the Tarn-et-Garonne department, and is a member of the Radical Party of the Left.
