= Robert Fabre =

French pharmacist and politician

French Ombudsman
- In office 1980–1986
- Preceded by: Aimé Paquet
- Succeeded by: Paul Legatte

French parliamentarian
- In office 1962–1980
- Constituency: Aveyron's 2nd constituency

Personal details
- Born: 21 December 1915
- Died: 23 December 2006 (aged 91)
- Party: MRG
- Other political affiliations: Radical-Socialist (until 1972)

Robert Fabre (French pronunciation: [ʁɔbɛʁ fabʁ]; 21 December 1915 in Villefranche-de-Rouergue, Aveyron – 23 December 2006 in Villefranche-de-Rouergue, Aveyron) was a French politician and pharmacist.

He was a founding member of the Left Radical Movement (MRG) in 1972 and served as the leader of the MRG until 1978. In this capacity, he became known as the "third man" - the third signatory of the Common Programme of the Union of the Left with François Mitterrand (PS) and Georges Marchais (PCF). He was himself excluded from the party in 1979 when he accepted a special research mission on work offered to him by right-wing President Valéry Giscard d'Estaing. He founded the Federation of Radical Democracy, but the party never achieved significant success. He also was mayor of Villefranche-de-Rouergue from 1953 to 1983.

He supported a gradual establishment of a European federation.

He died in 2006, shortly after the death of Jean-Jacques Servan-Schreiber, his rival within the Radical-Socialist Party. Servan-Schreiber has been the leader of the right wing of the Radical Party.
