= Pierre Gosnat =

French politician

Member of the National Assembly for Val-de-Marne's 10th constituency
- In office 20 June 2007 – 19 June 2012
- Preceded by: Jean-Claude Lefort
- Succeeded by: Jean-Luc Laurent

Mayor of Ivry-sur-Seine
- In office 1998–2015
- Preceded by: Jacques Laloë
- Succeeded by: Philippe Bouyssou

Personal details
- Born: 20 August 1948; Paris, France
- Died: 25 January 2015 (aged 66); Paris, France
- Political party: French Communist Party

Pierre Gosnat (August 20, 1948 – January 25, 2015) was a French politician who was a member of the National Assembly of France. He represented the Val-de-Marne department, and was a member of the Gauche démocrate et républicaine.
