= Jean-Claude Lefort =

French politician (1944–2024)

Member of the National Assembly for Val-de-Marne's 10th constituency
- In office 23 June 1988 – 19 June 2007
- Preceded by: proportionally by department
- Succeeded by: Pierre Gosnat
- Parliamentary group: GDR

Personal details
- Born: 15 December 1944 Paris, Seine, France
- Died: 19 June 2024 (aged 79)
- Party: Communist
- Relations: Salah Hammouri (son-in-law)
- Children: Elsa Lefort-Hammouri (daughter)

Jean-Claude Lefort (French: [ʒɑ̃klod ləfɔʁ]; 15 December 1944 – 19 June 2024) was a French politician. He was a French Communist Party deputy from Val-de-Marne from 1988 to 2007. Beyond his legislative function, however, he also engaged in many activities relating to France's foreign affairs, and also fought for social justice, evincing solidarity with both the Palestinian people and also the Romani people.

== Early life ==
Born in Paris, Lefort spent his childhood and youth in Bagnolet, Seine-Saint-Denis, in modest circumstances. His father, a workman, had taken up arms alongside the Republican faction in the International Brigades during the Spanish Civil War, while his mother was a childcare staffer at a school.

Unlike his father, however, Lefort's struggles in the 1960s and 1970s were of the pacifist and internationalist kind. As a youngster, he was already calling himself "manouche" ("Gypsy" — he had Romani blood on his father's side).

As a member of the national bureau of the Mouvement jeunes communistes de France (MJCF) and, beginning in 1964, of the French Communist Party, he was Party Secretary General Georges Marchais's private secretary. In 1983 he became secretary of the Party's Val-de-Marne federation; the Party's membership at this time was experiencing a sharp downturn, having dropped from some 520,000 in 1978 to roughly 380,000 in 1984.

== Political office and activities ==
Lefort was elected deputy from Val-de-Marne's 10th constituency, a seat that he held from 1988 to 2007.

As a member of the Foreign Affairs Committee across three sittings of French Parliament ("législatures"), he took part in many international negotiations and busied himself with many matters. In 1998, he proposed to create an "investigative committee into French responsibility in the genocide perpetrated in Rwanda". Lefort eventually became this body's vice-chairman, although it was now named the Mission d'information parlementaire sur le Rwanda, but he found himself disagreeing with the mission report's final conclusions and refused to be counted as a co-author.

In memory of the struggle against fascism in Spain, Lefort was a founding co-chairman of the Association of Friends of Combatants in Republican Spain (Association des amis des combattants en Espagne républicaine; Acer), with José Fort and François Asensi. Thanks to his prerogatives within the Foreign Affairs Committee, he was able to recover part of the International Brigades' archives that had been deposited in Moscow.

Lefort was rapporteur on economic relations between the European Union and the United States. He participated in the World Trade Organization's (WTO) working meetings from 1999 to 2007. Noting the absence of parliamentary control over the executive's various international activities, he sought to establish a delegation in Parliament that would be in charge of such issues. He also authored parliamentary reports on the South. He wrote a report on the agreements between European Union (EU) countries and member countries of the Organisation of African, Caribbean and Pacific States (OACPS) with the references "Has the WTO lost the South?" and also "EU–OACPS: holding out a hand or a fist?"

Beginning in 2007, Lefort was the honorary chairman of Appui Rwanda, a support association for survivors of the Tutsi genocide in Rwanda in 1994.

In May 2009, Lefort was elected chairman of the France-Palestine Solidarity Association (AFPS), after the movement's second congress. He succeeded Bernard Ravenel. He was the coordinator of the National Support Committee for Salah Hamouri, who would become Lefort's son-in-law in 2014. Such efforts earned him praise from Palestinians, but also death threats from others. One such threat that Lefort received told him that he should look out for stray bullets.

In October 2013, Lefort called for Minister of the Interior Manuel Valls to resign over his policies towards the Romani people. He reminded the Socialist minister of his own emigration from Spain to flee Francisco Franco's régime, and compared it to the Romani people's situation, suffering discrimination in their countries of origin. He referred to himself as "Jean-Claude Lefort, fils de Manouche" ("Jean-Claude Lefort, Gipsy's son").

In June 2015, he warned Muslims against Israeli products, a warning that the press commented on. Gilles-William Goldnadel filed a complaint against him in the name of the association France-Israël. Lefort won the case, however.

Lefort quit the French Communist Party on 19 January 2024 "with great pain" following a dispute with his secretary general, Fabien Roussel over the Gaza war.

== Death ==
Lefort died of cancer on 19 June 2024, at the age of 79.

== Awards ==
By presidential decree dated 31 December 2010, Lefort was to be decorated with the knight's insignia of the Legion of Honour. The ceremony was held on 7 December 2011, at which Lefort was decorated by Cécile Rol-Tanguy, herself Commander of the Legion of Honour and a recipient of the Resistance Medal, in the presence of the Ambassador of Palestine to France, Hael Al Fahoum, and Pierre Gosnat.

== Mandates ==
- 13 June 1988 – 1 April 1993: deputy for Val-de-Marne's 10th constituency
- 2 April 1993 – 21 April 1997: reelected
- 1 June 1997 – 18 June 2002: reelected
- 19 June 2002 – 19 June 2007: reelected

== See also ==
- List of Deputies for Val-de-Marne (in French)
