= Jean-Noël Carpentier =

French politician (1969–2024)

Jean-Noël Carpentier (9 December 1969 – 20 November 2024) was a French politician. He was a deputy from 2012 to 2017 representing Val-d'Oise's 3rd constituency. On 15 November 2024, he was diagnosed with lung cancer. He succumbed to the disease five days later, on 20 November, at the age of 54.
