= Marie-Noëlle Lienemann =

French politician

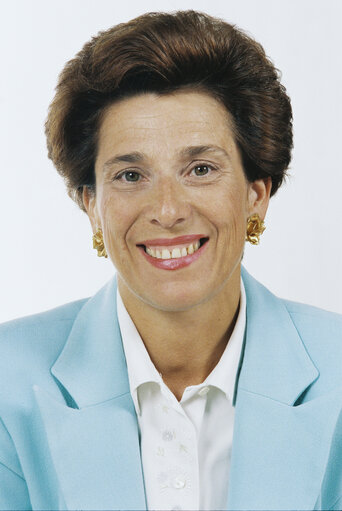

Member of the French Senate for Paris
- In office 1 October 2011 – 1 October 2023

Secretary of State for Housing
- In office 27 March 2001 – 6 May 2002
- President: Jacques Chirac
- Prime Minister: Lionel Jospin
- Preceded by: Louis Besson
- Succeeded by: Marc-Philippe Daubresse

Mayor of Athis-Mons
- In office 1989–2001
- Preceded by: René L'Helguen
- Succeeded by: François Garcia

Personal details
- Born: 12 July 1951 (age 75) Belfort, France
- Party: Republican and Socialist Left
- Education: ENS Cachan
- Profession: Teacher

Marie-Noëlle Lienemann (born 12 July 1951, in Belfort) is a French politician who served as Member of the European Parliament for the North West of France. Until 2018, she was a member of the Socialist Party, part of the Party of European Socialists.

== Early life and education ==
Lienemann studied chemistry at the École Normale Supérieure de Cachan (ENS Cachan).

== Political career ==
Lienemann was part of the European Parliament's delegation to the 2008 United Nations Climate Change Conference in Poznań, Poland.

Ahead of the Socialist Party's 2011 primaries, Lienemann endorsed Martine Aubry as the party's candidate for the 2012 presidential election.

In 2012, Lienemann co-founded the "Now The Left" grouping alongside Emmanuel Maurel. Together they urged President François Hollande to abandon the government's 2013 deficit targets and embark on a dash for growth. Following the Socialist Party's losses in the 2014 municipal elections, Lienemann and Maurel co-authored an open letter addressed to Hollande, calling on him to return to Socialist basics, end a freeze on public sector salaries, and raise the minimum salary and pensions.

Ahead of the Socialist Party's 2018 convention in Aubervilliers, Lienemann publicly endorsed Maurel as candidate for the party's leadership. In October 2018, she and Maurel left the Socialist Party and founded the left-wing Alternative for a Republican, Ecologist and Socialist Program (APRÉS). It merged with Jean-Pierre Chevènement's Citizen and Republican Movement in February 2019 to form the Republican and Socialist Left (GRS).
