= Émile Zuccarelli =

French politician (born 1940)

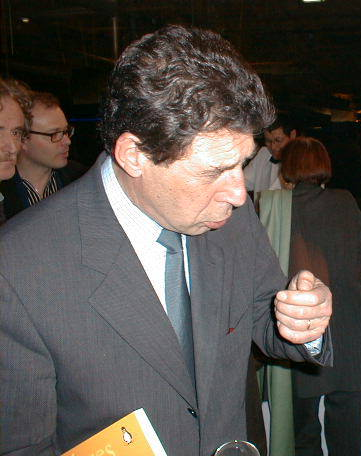
- Zuccarelli in 2006

Mayor of Bastia
- In office 20 March 1989 – 5 April 2014
- Preceded by: Jean Zuccarelli
- Succeeded by: Gilles Simeoni

Personal details
- Born: 4 August 1940 Bastia, Corsica
- Party: The Radical Party of the Left
- Other political affiliations: The Radical Movement
- Parent: Jean Zuccarelli (father)
- Profession: Engineer

Émile Zuccarelli (Italian: [eˈmil dzukkaˈrɛlli, tsuk-]; born 4 August 1940 in Bastia, Upper Corsica) is a French politician from Corsica. He serves as honorary President of the Radical Party of the Left and is a former mayor of Bastia. Before his defeat in the 2007 French legislative election, he was deputy for Upper Corsica.

In the 2004 French regional elections, Zuccarelli led a PRG list in Corsica and came out on top of all of the left-wing's lists. But the lack of dialog between him and another PRG list, led by his rival Paul Giacobbi, prevented him from winning.

Unlike his own political party, Zuccarelli called for a "NO" vote in the 2005 referendum on the Treaty establishing a Constitution for Europe.

== Political career ==
Governmental functions

- Minister of Public Service, State Reform and Decentralization : 1997–2000.
- Minister of Posts and Telecommunications : 1992–1993.

Electoral mandates

National Assembly

- Member of the National Assembly of France for Upper Corsica: 1986–1992 (Became minister in 1992) / 1993–1997 (Became minister in 1997) / 2000–2007. Elected in 1986, reelected in 1988, 1993, 1997, 2000, 2002.

Corsican Territorial Collectivity

- Member of the Corsican Assembly : 1998–2002 (Resignation) / March–December 2004 (Resignation). Reelected in 2004.

Municipal Council

- Mayor of Bastia : 1989–1997 (Resignation) / Since 2000.
- Deputy-mayor of Bastia : 1997–2000.
- Municipal councillor of Bastia : Since 1989.

Agglomeration community Council

- President of the Agglomeration community of Bastia : Since 2002.
- Member of the Agglomeration community of Bastia : Since 2002.

Political function

- President of the Radical Party of the Left: 1989–1992.

Political offices
Preceded by Jean Zuccarelli	Mayor of Bastia; 1989–2014	Succeeded by Gilles Simeoni
