= Jean-Luc Laurent =

French politician (1957–2024)

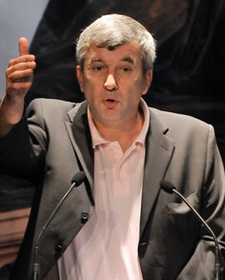
- Laurent in 2008

Mayor of Le Kremlin-Bicêtre
- In office 4 July 2020 – 11 January 2024
- Preceded by: Jean-Marc Nicolle
- Succeeded by: Jean-François Delage

Member of the National Assembly for Val-de-Marne's 10th constituency
- In office 21 June 2012 – 21 June 2017
- Preceded by: Pierre Gosnat
- Succeeded by: Mathilde Panot

President of the Citizen and Republican Movement
- In office 27 June 2010 – 11 January 2024
- Preceded by: Jean-Pierre Chevènement
- Succeeded by: Vacant

Personal details
- Born: 23 June 1957 Paris, France
- Died: 11 January 2024 (aged 66) Le Plessis-Robinson, France
- Party: MRC

Jean-Luc Laurent (23 June 1957 – 11 January 2024) was a French politician who was a member of the Citizen and Republican Movement. He was Member of Parliament for Val-de-Marne's 10th constituency from 2012 to 2017.

== Life and career ==
Laurent was elected to Parliament in Val-de-Marne's 10th constituency in the 2012 legislative election, defeating incumbent MP Pierre Gosnat from the Left Front.

He lost his seat to Mathilde Panot of La France Insoumise in the 2017 legislative election.

Laurent was mayor of Kremlin-Bicêtre beginning in 2020.

Laurent died of a heart attack in Le Plessis-Robinson on 11 January 2024 at the age of 66.

== See also ==
- List of deputies of the 14th National Assembly of France
