= Guillaume Lacroix =

French politician (born 1976)

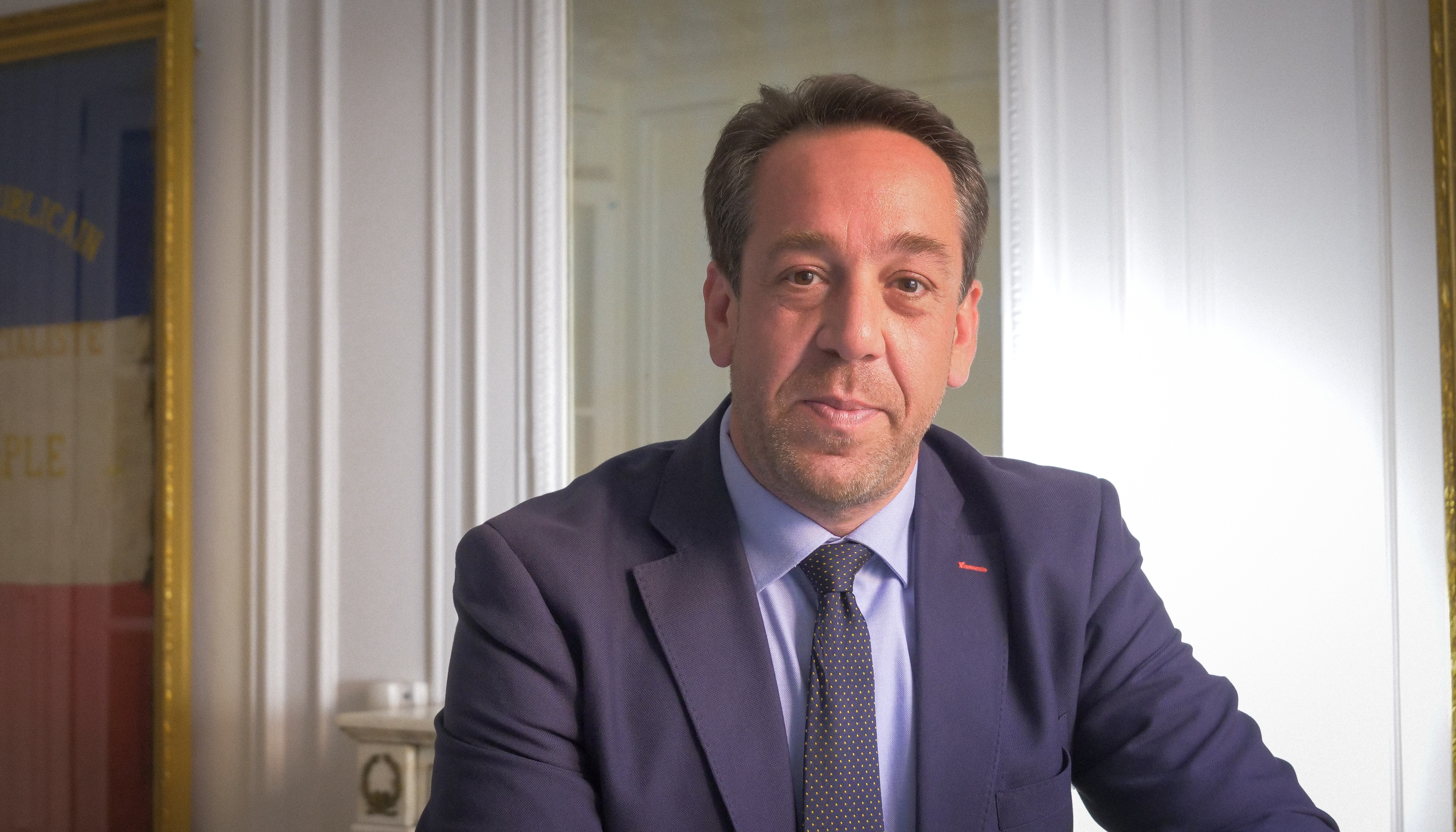
- Lacroix in 2020

President of the Radical Party of the Left
- Incumbent
- Assumed office 6 February 2019

Personal details
- Born: 11 February 1976 (age 50)
- Party: Radical Party of the Left (1994–2017, 2019–present)
- Other political affiliations: Radical Movement (2017–2019)

Guillaume Lacroix (born 11 February 1976) is a French politician serving as president of the Radical Party of the Left since 2019. He has been a member of the Regional Council of Auvergne-Rhône-Alpes since 2021, and served as vice president of the Departmental Council of Ain from 2008 to 2015. In the 2012 legislative election, he was a candidate for Ain's 4th constituency.
