= Programme commun =

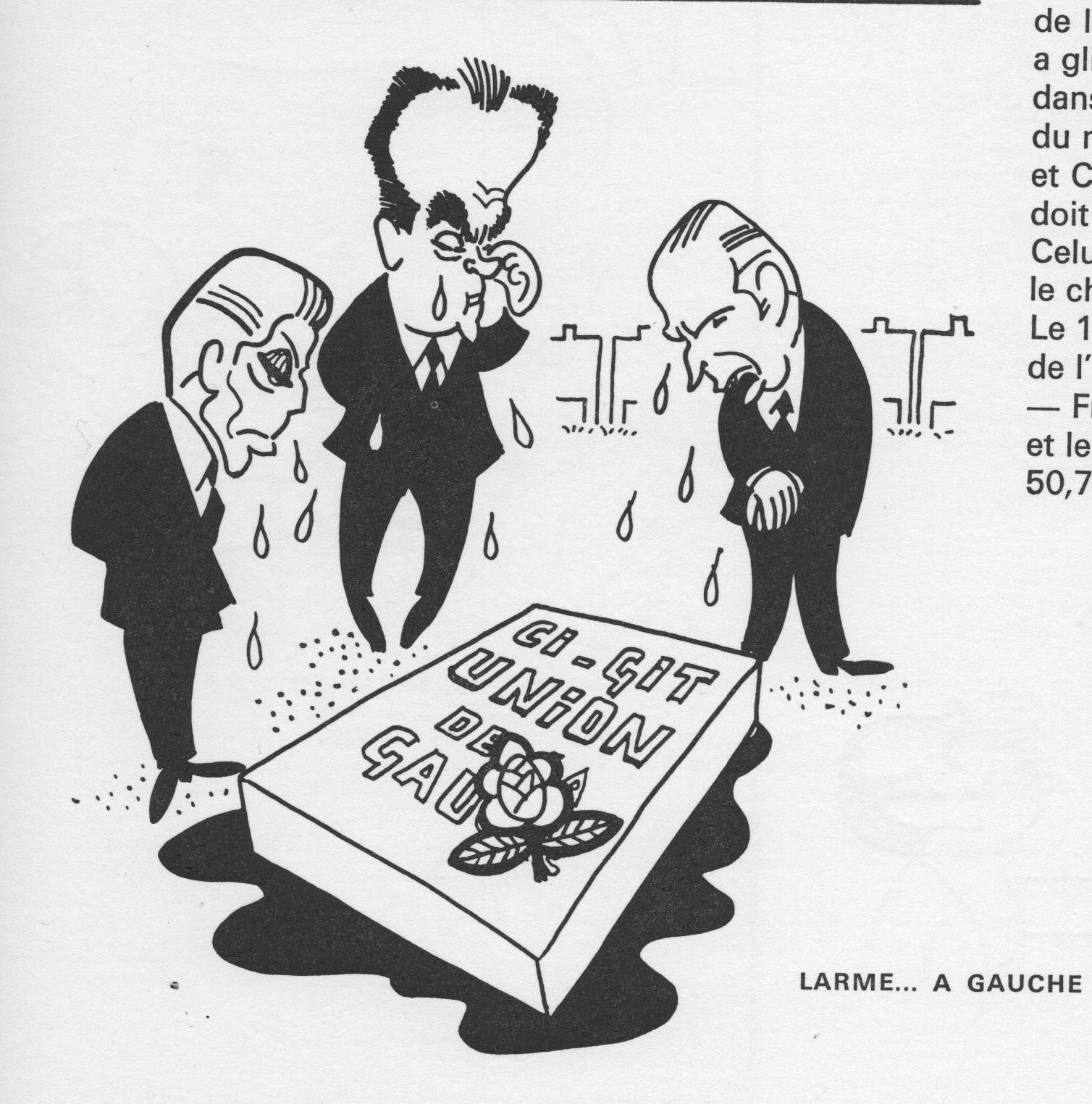
Robert Fabre, Georges Marchais and François Mitterrand at the tomb of the Union of the Left, cartoon drawn by Maurice Tournade in 1980.

The Programme commun was a reform programme, signed 27 June 1972 by the Socialist Party, the French Communist Party and the centrist Radical Movement of the Left, which provided a great upheaval in the economic, political and military fields in France. That alliance, known as the "Union of the Left", opened a political repositioning for the left that lasted 30 years, contributing particularly to the election of François Mitterrand in the presidential election of 1981. Between 1981 and 1983, he began putting Programme commun into action.

The Keynesian-inspired policies led to an increase in the fiscal deficit and the trade deficit. To keep France in the European Monetary System, a different approach was needed.

In March 1983, Mitterrand did a U-turn by cancelling the parts of Programme commun that had been already passed, which was sometimes referred to as the "austerity turn".

== Projects ==
- Living better, changing lives: Reduction of working hours (down to 40 hours per week), higher wages, social security expansion, socialised housing.
- Compensated nationalisation of major industrial companies in the key sectors, of 38 banks and financial institutions, increased market regulation, worker participation in company decisions.
- Decentralisation and democratisation of government institutions, guarantee of individual liberties, restriction of police custody.
- Fight against unemployment.
- Politics of peace: Abolishing nuclear deterrent, military service reduction to 6 months, dissolution of both NATO and the Warsaw Pact.
- Education reform.
