= National Automated Genetic Fingerprint File =

French national DNA database

The National Automated Genetic Fingerprint File (French: Fichier national automatisé des empreintes génétiques) is the national DNA database owned and operated by the government of France. It is used by both the country's national police force and local gendarmerie.

As of the end of 2024, the database had 4.4 million DNA profiles.

== Origins and evolution ==
In June 1998, the Guigou law on the prevention of sexually related crimes, passed by the Plural Left Lionel Jospin government, created a national DNA database. The implementation, originally planned for 1999, was finally completed in 2001, with the database itself located at Écully in the Rhône, managed by a sub-directorate of the technical and scientific departments of the French police force.

In the aftermath of the September 11 attacks on the US in 2001, the French government increased the scope of the database to include DNA related to other serious criminal offences, such as voluntary manslaughter, criminal violence and terrorism.

A further 'law for interior safety' introduced on 18 March 2003 expanded the scope still further to cover almost all violent crimes to people or property, serious crimes such as drug trafficking, simple thefts, tags and dégradations, and finally almost all small offenses, but not traffic offenses or crimes committed abroad. Samples are taken from convicted persons and also from simple suspects. The law does not specify a minimum age.

In September 2009, Matthieu Bonduelle, the general secretary of the Syndicat de la Magistrature (the first syndicat of juges) has declared that "nobody defends a universal database, but, in fact, it is being done."

== Database size ==
- As at 1 October 2003, the database was understood to contain the DNA records of approximately 8,000 convicted criminals and another 3,200 suspects.
- In 2006, this number was believed to now be in excess of 330,000 entries.
- In May 2007, this number was believed to now be in excess of nearly 500,000 entries.
- In December 2009, there were 1.27 million entries.
- In the end of 2024, the database had 4.4 million DNA profiles.

== Privacy concerns ==
With the expansion of the database in 2003, it also became an offence for suspects to fail to provide a DNA sample, with punishment ranging from a prison sentence of between six months and two years, and a fine of between €7500 and €30000.

At the end of 2006, the media raised the case of individuals refusing to provide DNA samples. Many of them were civil disobedience activists opposed to Genetically modified organism (GMO) (See fr:Faucheurs volontaires). Although this was only around 200 cases, they denounced what they regarded as a threat to personal freedom.

== See also ==
- Government database
