= Emmanuel Maurel =

French politician (born 1973)

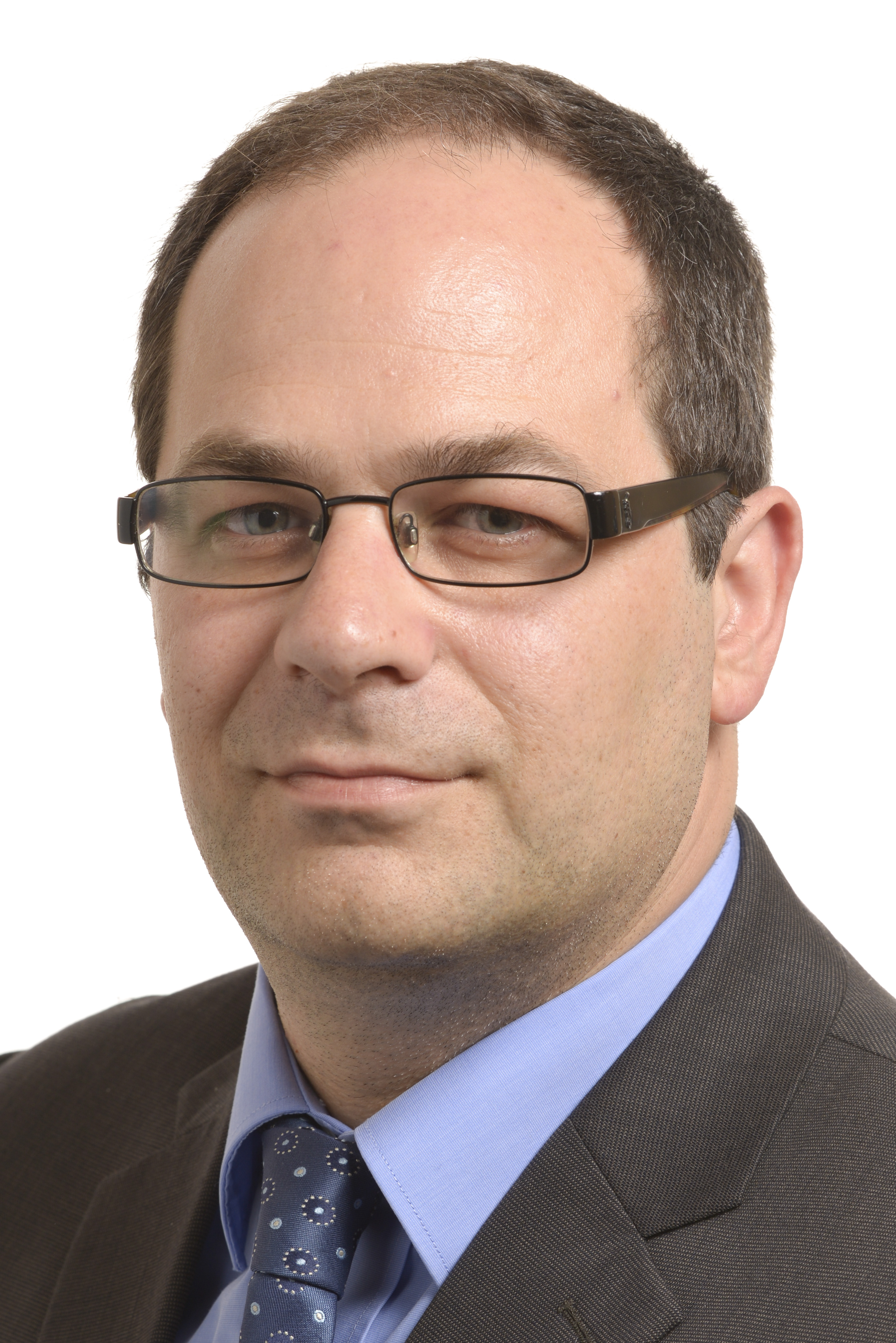
- Official portrait, 2014

Member of the National Assembly for Val-d'Oise's 3rd constituency
- Incumbent
- Assumed office 8 July 2024
- Preceded by: Cécile Rilhac

Member of the European Parliament
- In office 1 July 2014 – 15 July 2024
- Constituency: North West

Personal details
- Born: 10 May 1973 (age 53) Épinay-sur-Seine, France
- Party: New Popular Front; Republican and Socialist Left (2018)
- Education: Sciences Po; Paris-Sorbonne University

Emmanuel Maurel (born 10 May 1973 in Épinay-sur-Seine), is a French politician. He was a member of the board of the French Socialist Party. He was a candidate for the leadership of the Socialist Party but lost against Harlem Désir, winning almost a third of the votes.

Maurel was a declared candidate for the leadership of the Socialist Party at the Aubervilliers Congress in 2018. On 12 October, he announced his departure from the party. He is currently part of the Republican and Socialist Left.

== Political career ==
=== Career in national politics ===
In the 2011 Socialist Party presidential primary, Maurel endorsed the campaign of Martine Aubry and opposed François Hollande.

In 2012, Maurel co-founded the "Now The Left" grouping alongside Senator Marie-Noëlle Lienemann. Together they urged President Hollande to abandon his 2013 deficit targets and embark on a dash for growth. Following the Socialist Party’s losses in the 2014 municipal elections, Maurel and Lienemann co-authored an open letter addressed to Hollande, calling on him to return to Socialist basics, end a freeze on public sector salaries, and raise the minimum salary and pensions.

=== Member of the European Parliament, 2014–present ===
Maurel has been a Member of the European Parliament since the 2014 European elections. A member of the Progressive Alliance of Socialists and Democrats group, he has since been serving on the Committee on International Trade. He was also member of the Special Committee on Tax Rulings and Other Measures Similar in Nature or Effect (2015-2016) and the Committee of Inquiry into Money Laundering, Tax Avoidance and Tax Evasion (2016-2017) that investigated the Panama Papers revelations and tax avoidance schemes more broadly.

In addition to his committee assignments, Maurel is a member of the parliament’s delegation for relations with India. Since 2023, he has also been chairing the delegation to the Maghreb countries.
