= Citizen and Republican Movement =

Political party in France

Citizen and Republican Movement Mouvement républicain et citoyen
- President: Thierry Cotelle
- Founder: Jean-Pierre Chevènement
- Founded: 1993; 33 years ago (MDC); 2002; 24 years ago (PR); 2003; 23 years ago (MRC)
- Split from: Socialist Party
- Headquarters: 9 Rue du Faubourg Poissonnière; 75009 Paris
- Ideology: Democratic socialism; Soft Euroscepticism; Social Gaullism; Souverainism
- Political position: Left-wing
- National affiliation: Federation of the Republican Left (2022–present); New Popular Front (2024–present)
- European affiliation: EUDemocrats (until 2017)
- Colours: Red, Blue
- National Assembly: 0 / 577
- Senate: 0 / 348
- European Parliament: 0 / 74
- Regional Councils: 2 / 1,910

Website
- www.mrc-france.org

The Citizen and Republican Movement (French: Mouvement républicain et citoyen) is a left-wing political party in France. The party replaced the Citizens' Movement (Mouvement des citoyens, MDC) in 2002. The previous party was founded by Jean-Pierre Chevènement, who left the Socialist Party (PS) in 1993 due to his opposition to the Gulf War and to the Maastricht Treaty. It is a Eurosceptic and sovereigntist party that strongly opposes European integration and promotes the "multipolar order" instead; the party argues that the United States of America holds a hegemonic position over the international markets and relations, and seeks to replace that with an order where no major power would dominate. The party criticizes the European Union for its capitalist policies, and is completely opposed to proposals to centralize or federalize the European Union.

Despite being a split from it, the party cooperates with the Socialist Party and usually shares the electoral lists with it. The party partakes in "popular fronts", actively seeking ties and alliances with fellow left-wing parties. It has links to far-left parties that are against the European Union and NATO; it also cooperates with moderate "broad left" parties in France. In 2019, the party took part in the creation of the Republican and Socialist Left (GRS) by joining forces with the Alternative for a Republican, Ecologist and Socialist Program (APRÉS), created by Marie-Noëlle Lienemann and Emmanuel Maurel after their departure from the Socialist Party, but without merging.

== History ==
Chevènement led the list l'autre politique (the Other Policy) for 1994 European Parliament election. It included members of left-wing opposition (socialist and communist candidates) to Maastricht Treaty, feminists, radicals, and Gaullists. The MDC supported the Socialist candidate Lionel Jospin for the 1995 French presidential election, then integrated the Gauche plurielle coalition. From 1997 to 2000, it was represented in the government by Chevènement as Interior Minister. In order to prepare the 2002 French presidential election, Chevènement created the Pôle républicain, which included a wide range of politicians including radicals, Gaullists, souverainists, and socialists. He won over 5% and is sometimes blamed for Jospin's elimination. Its lack of success in the 2002 French legislative election, losing all 7 MDC deputies elected in 1997, prompted Chevènement to rename his party the Citizen and Republican Movement. Chevènement was defeated in his seat in Territoire-de-Belfort.

The foundation of the MRC meant a realignment to the left, and the Pôle républicain was supposed to gather "the Republicans of the left and the right". Chevènement and the MRC supported the Socialist Ségolène Royal's candidacy in the 2007 French presidential election to prevent a new 21 April 2002 shock. The MRC fielded candidates in the 2007 French legislative election, including Chevènement in Territoire-de-Belfort, seat he had lost in 2002 to the Union for a Popular Movement (UMP). He failed to win back his seat, but Christian Hutin, a left-wing Gaullist, was elected in the Nord département. The party has one Senator, Chevènement, who sits in the European Democratic and Social Rally (RDSE) group, which is the more pro-European group. In the 2009 and the 2014 European Parliament elections, the party did not run or support any list. Negotiations with the Socialist Party and the new Left Front failed. The party instead asked its supporters to boycott the elections.

In October 2018, PS MEP Emmanuel Maurel and senator Marie-Noëlle Lienemann announced that they would leave the Socialists to ally with the MRC in a new party called Gauche républicaine et socialiste (GRS). On 12 November 2018, a group presided over by Jean-Marie Alexandre announced the reconstitution of the MDC as a party.

== Ideology ==
The Citizen and Republican Movement is a left-wing Eurosceptic and sovereigntist party. The party is a split from the Socialist Party, led by socialists who opposed the ratification of the Maastricht Treaty as well as strongly protested the Persian Gulf War. The party became famous for its alternative to the European integration - it proposed a concept of a multipolar world, where no major country would have a dominant position; the MRC particularly stresses that multipolarity is a challenge to the hegemonic position of the United States. The party sees potential in the Common Foreign and Security Policy, arguing that it “had opened the way for autonomous European action which could challenge US hegemony and contribute to the development of multipolar world”.

The Euroscepticism of the party is its trademark political position. It strongly opposes the federalization of the European Union and criticizes European integration, envisioning a sovereigntist European Union instead which would be based on intergovernmental decision-making. The party also opposes the neoliberal economic policies of the European Union, stressing that any kind of European international organization should implement regulations and restrictions on multinational corporations instead. It argues for a "Europe of Nations" and highlights the pro-capitalist direction of the European integration; the party leader Jean-Luc Laurent compared the European Union to a multinational corporation, stating that it seeks to eliminate national interests in order to further promote capitalism.

As a split from the Socialist Party, the Citizen and Republican Movement is socialist, and still contests elections in alliance with the PS. Along with its socialism however, the party also emphasizes republicanism, nationalism and strong law-and-order appeal. It exalts the nationalist aspect of the Paris Commune, calling it a "a social and patriotic act of resistance". The Citizen and Republican Movement describes itself as a party that combines "national independence with the quest for social equality", and stated: "There cannot be one without the other. In the Citizen and Republican Movement, we customarily say that social progress without national freedom is a fraud." The MRC also broadly cooperates with fellow anti-EU left-wing parties, including having links with far-left groups that oppose Maastrich and Amsterdam Treaties, as well as sharing electoral lists with the "plural left".
