= Same-sex marriage in France =

Same-sex marriage has been legal in France since 18 May 2013. A bill granting same-sex couples the right to marry and jointly adopt children was introduced to the National Assembly by the Socialist government of Prime Minister Jean-Marc Ayrault on 7 November 2012, with the support of President François Hollande who declared his intent to support the legislation during his campaign for the presidency. On 12 February 2013, the National Assembly approved the bill in a 329–229 vote. On 12 April, the Senate approved the bill with amendments in a 171–165 vote, followed by the approval of the amended bill by the National Assembly on 23 April in a 331–225 vote. However, a challenge to the law by the conservative Union for a Popular Movement party was filed with the Constitutional Council following the vote. On 17 May, the Council ruled that the law was constitutional. That same day, President Hollande promulgated the bill, which was officially published the next day in the Journal Officiel de la République Française. The first official same-sex marriage ceremony took place on 29 May in the city of Montpellier.

The legislation applies to metropolitan France as well as to all French overseas departments and territories. It made France the thirteenth country in the world and the ninth in Europe to allow same-sex couples to marry. Polling suggests that a significant majority of French people support the legal recognition of same-sex marriage.

== Civil solidarity pact ==
Laws regarding same-sex partnerships in Europe¹ Marriage Civil union Limited domestic recognition (cohabitation) Unrecognized Constitution limits marriage to opposite-sex couples ¹ May include recent laws or court decisions that have not yet entered into effect.

Despite the creation and implementation in 1999 of the civil solidarity pact (French: pacte civil de solidarité, pronounced [pakt sivil də sɔlidaʁite]), (Note: In some regional languages of France: Alsatian: Eha-n-anliga Lawesgmainschàft, pronounced [ˈeːanˌaːnliɡ̊a ˈlaːʋesˌɡ̊mai̯nʃɑft]; Basque: elkartasun itun zibila, pronounced [elkartas̺un itun s̻iβiʎa]; Breton: emglev keodedel a gengred, pronounced [ˈemɡlɛw kewˈdeːdɛl a ˈgɛngret]; Catalan: pacte civil de solidaritat, pronounced [ˈpaktə siˈβil ðə suliðəɾiˈtat]; Corsican: pattu civile di sulidarità, pronounced [ˈpattu tʃiˈvile di sulidariˈta]; Franco-Provençal: pakte sivilo dè solidaritâ; Marquesan: tekaotui pātoko; Occitan: pacte civil de solidaritat, pronounced [ˈpatte siˈβil, -vil ðe suliðaɾiˈtat]; Picard: pacte civil ed solidarité; Tahitian: faʼaauraʼa autaeaʼeraʼa, pronounced [faʔaˈau̯raʔa ˌau̯tˌae̯.aˈʔeraʔa]; West Flemish: burgerlyk solidariteitspact) more commonly known as PACS, a system allowing civil partnerships between two persons without regard to their gender and guaranteeing certain personal and civil rights to both "pacsés", there was considerable political and societal debate over same-sex marriage in France during the first decade of the 21st century.

The civil solidarity pact was voted on by the French Parliament in November 1999 with the support of Prime Minister Lionel Jospin. Following President Hollande's signature of a 2013 legalising same-sex marriage, PACS remains in effect and available for both opposite-sex and same-sex couples.

== Same-sex marriage ==
=== 2004 Bègles marriage ===
Mayor of the Bordeaux suburb of Bègles Noël Mamère, a former Greens presidential candidate, conducted a same-sex marriage ceremony for two men, Bertrand Charpentier and Stéphane Chapin, on 5 June 2004. Mamère claimed that there was nothing in French law to prohibit such a ceremony, and that he would appeal any challenge to the European Court of Human Rights. Minister of Justice Dominique Perben had stated that such unions would be legally void, and called for judicial intervention to halt the ceremony. On 27 July 2004, the Bordeaux Court of General Jurisdiction declared the marriage "null and void". One legal argument defended by the public prosecutor, representing the national government, was that the French Civil Code contained several mentions of "husband" and "wife", thereby implying different genders. On 19 April 2005, the Appeals Court of Bordeaux upheld the ruling, and on 14 March 2007, the Court of Cassation turned down Charpentier and Chapin's appeal. On 9 June 2016, the European Court of Human Rights ruled that the decision to invalidate Charpentier and Chapin's marriage did not constitute an infringement of the European Convention on Human Rights.

Shortly after the ceremony took place, Interior Minister Dominique de Villepin instituted disciplinary procedures against Mamère, suspending him from his duties for one month. The local administrative court ruled that Mamère's suspension was legal and substantiated. Mamère said he would not appeal the ruling, having already unsuccessfully attempted to get an injunction from the court, then appealing the case to the Council of State; both had ruled that an injunction was not justified on grounds of urgency. On 11 May 2004, the First Secretary of the Socialist Party, François Hollande, announced that he would ask his party to file a draft law making same-sex marriages unequivocally legal. Some other party leaders, such as former Prime Minister Lionel Jospin, publicly disapproved of same-sex marriage. Hollande's partner, Ségolène Royal, said at the time that she harbored doubts about same-sex marriage, though now fully supports it.

=== Developments in 2006–2011 ===
A parliamentary "Report on the Family and the Rights of Children" (Rapport au nom de la mission d'information sur la famille et les droits des enfants) was released on 25 January 2006. Although the committee recommended increasing some of the rights already granted by the PACS civil partnership, it recommended maintaining prohibitions against marriage, adoption and access to medically assisted reproduction for same-sex couples, arguing that these three issues were inseparable and that allowing them would contravene a number of articles of the United Nations Convention on the Rights of the Child, to which France is a signatory (though many UN member nations did grant some or all of these rights to same-sex couples). Referring to the rights of children as a human rights issue, the report argued that children "now have rights, and to systematically give preference to adult aspirations over respect for these rights is not possible anymore." Because of these prohibitions, left-wing members of the committee rejected the report.

LGBT organizations in France, believing that the prohibition of same-sex marriage was contrary to the Constitution of France, asked the Constitutional Council to examine the constitutionality of same-sex marriage and to review the articles of the Civil Code. On 28 January 2011, the Council decided that the illegality of same-sex marriages was not contrary to the Constitution, further stating that same-sex marriage legalization was a question for Parliament to decide.

On 14 June 2011, the National Assembly of France voted 293–222 against legalizing same-sex marriage. Deputies of the governing Union for a Popular Movement (UMP) party mostly voted against the measure, while deputies of the Socialist Party mostly voted in favour. Members of the Socialist Party said that the legalization of same-sex marriage would become a priority should they gain a majority in the 2012 legislative election. On 12 November 2011, Mayor Jean Vila of Cabestany performed a same-sex wedding ceremony for a couple named Patrick, 48, and Guillaume, 37. The marriage was not recorded in order to prevent a subsequent nullification, and Vila described it as a "militant act", saying that "there are times when it is necessary to act outside the law. Refusing same-sex marriage is to deny the reality of thousands of couples." The French Government's reaction was mixed: the Secretary of State for Family, Claude Greff, called the event a "provocation on the eve of the presidential election", while Minister of Solidarity and Social Cohesion Roselyne Bachelot said she supported same-sex marriage but that the ceremony was "not the best way to advance the cause".

=== 2012–2013 bill ===
==== Passage and promulgation ====
The French National Assembly voting for same-sex marriage, 23 April 2013

During his campaign for the 2012 presidential election, Socialist Party candidate François Hollande declared his support for same-sex marriage and adoption by same-sex couples, including them as one of his campaign's 60 government commitments. On 6 May 2012, Hollande won the election and promised to pass same-sex marriage legislation before the spring of 2013. On 17 June, Hollande's party won an absolute majority in the National Assembly, followed by an announcement by government spokesperson Najat Vallaud-Belkacem that a same-sex marriage bill would be adopted in spring 2013 at the latest. On 3 July, in his first speech in front of the newly elected assembly, Prime Minister Jean-Marc Ayrault announced that marriage and adoption for all couples would be a reality "in the first semester of 2013". The draft bill was submitted to the French Parliament on 7 November 2012.

On 2 February 2013, the National Assembly approved the first article of the same-sex marriage bill by 249 votes to 97; the debate took several days as opponents introduced more than 5,000 amendments to the bill in order to slow down its passage. La Manif pour tous also organised large-scale demonstrations against the law. On 12 February, the National Assembly approved the bill as a whole in a 329–229 vote and sent it to the Senate. The Senate started debating the bill on 4 April 2013 and five days later approved its first article in a 179–157 vote. On 12 April, it approved the bill with minor amendments in a 171–165 vote. The Senate version of the marriage bill was adopted by the National Assembly on 23 April 2013 in a 331–225 vote.

23 April 2013 vote in the National Assembly
Party	Voted for	Voted against	Abstained	Absent (Did not vote)
Socialist, Republican and Citizen group	281: Ibrahim Aboubacar; Patricia Adam; Sylviane Alaux; Jean-Pierre Allossery; Pouria Amirshahi; François André; Sylvie Andrieux; Nathalie Appéré; Christian Assaf; Avi Assouly; Pierre Aylagas; Alexis Bachelay; Guillaume Bachelay; Jean-Paul Bacquet; Dominique Baert; Gérard Bapt; Frédéric Barbier; Serge Bardy; Ericka Bareigts; Christian Bataille; Marie-Noëlle Battistel; Laurent Baumel; Philippe Baumel; Nicolas Bays; Catherine Beaubatie; Jean-Marie Beffara; Luc Belot; Karine Berger; Chantal Berthelot; Gisèle Biémouret; Philippe Bies; Erwann Binet; Jean-Pierre Blazy; Yves Blein; Jean-Luc Bleunven; Patrick Bloche; Daniel Boisserie; Pascale Boistard; Christophe Borgel; Florent Boudié; Marie-Odile Bouillé; Christophe Bouillon; Brigitte Bourguignon; Malek Boutih; Kheira Bouziane; Émeric Bréhier; Jean-Louis Bricout; Jean-Jacques Bridey; François Brottes; Isabelle Bruneau; Gwenegan Bui; Sabine Buis; Jean-Claude Buisine; Sylviane Bulteau; Vincent Burroni; Alain Calmette; Jean-Christophe Cambadélis; Colette Capdevielle; Yann Capet; Christophe Caresche; Fanélie Carrey-Conte; Martine Carrillon-Couvreur; Christophe Castaner; Laurent Cathala; Jean-Yves Caullet; Nathalie Chabanne; Guy Chambefort; Jean-Paul Chanteguet; Marie-Anne Chapdelaine; Guy-Michel Chauveau; Dominique Chauvel; Pascal Cherki; Jean-David Ciot; Alain Claeys; Jean-Michel Clément; Marie-Françoise Clergeau; Philip Cordery; Valérie Corre; Jean-Jacques Cottel; Catherine Coutelle; Jacques Cresta; Pascale Crozon; Seybah Dagoma; Yves Daniel; Carlos Da Silva; Pascal Deguilhem; Michèle Delaunay; Guy Delcourt; Carole Delga; Sébastien Denaja; Françoise Descamps-Crosnier; Sophie Dessus; Jean-Louis Destans; Michel Destot; Fanny Dombre-Coste; René Dosière; Philippe Doucet; Sandrine Doucet; Jean-Luc Drapeau; Françoise Dubois; Jean-Pierre Dufau; Anne-Lise Dufour-Tonini; Françoise Dumas; William Dumas; Jean-Louis Dumont; Laurence Dumont; Jean-Paul Dupré; Yves Durand; Philippe Duron; Olivier Dussopt; Christian Eckert; Henri Emmanuelli; Corinne Erhel; Sophie Errante; Marie-Hélène Fabre; Martine Faure; Olivier Faure; Alain Fauré; Matthias Fekl; Vincent Feltesse; Hervé Féron; Richard Ferrand; Jean-Pierre Fougerat; Hugues Fourage; Michèle Fournier-Armand; Michel Françaix; Christian Franqueville; Jean-Claude Fruteau; Jean-Louis Gagnaire; Geneviève Gaillard; Yann Galut; Hélène Geoffroy; Jean-Marc Germain; Jean-Patrick Gille; Jean Glavany; Yves Goasdoué; Daniel Goldberg; Geneviève Gosselin; Pascale Got; Marc Goua; Linda Gourjade; Laurent Grandguillaume; Estelle Grelier; Jean Grellier; Jérôme Guedj; Édith Gueugneau; Élisabeth Guigou; Thérèse Guilbert; Chantal Guittet; David Habib; Razzy Hammadi; Mathieu Hanotin; Danièle Hoffman-Rispal; Joëlle Huillier; Sandrine Hurel; Christian Hutin; Monique Iborra; Françoise Imbert; Michel Issindou; Éric Jalton; Serge Janquin; Henri Jibrayel; Régis Juanico; Armand Jung; Laurent Kalinowski; Marietta Karamanli; Philippe Kemel; Chaynesse Khirouni; Conchita Lacuey; Colette Langlade; Jean Launay; Pierre Léautey; Pierre-Yves Le Borgn'; Jean-Yves Le Bouillonnec; Gilbert Le Bris; Anne-Yvonne Le Dain; Jean-Yves Le Déaut; Viviane Le Dissez; Michel Lefait; Dominique Lefebvre; Jean-Marie Le Guen; Annie Le Houérou; Annick Le Loch; Axelle Lemaire; Patrick Lemasle; Catherine Lemorton; Christophe Léonard; Annick Lepetit; Jean-Pierre Le Roch; Bruno Le Roux; Arnaud Leroy; Michel Lesage; Bernard Lesterlin; Serge Letchimy; Michel Liebgott; Martine Lignières-Cassou; Audrey Linkenheld; François Loncle; Lucette Lousteau; Jean-Pierre Maggi; Thierry Mandon; Jacqueline Maquet; Marie-Lou Marcel; Jean-René Marsac; Philippe Martin; Martine Martinel; Frédérique Massat; Sandrine Mazetier; Michel Ménard; Patrick Mennucci; Kléber Mesquida; Pierre-Alain Muet; Philippe Nauche; Ségolène Neuville; Nathalie Nieson; Philippe Noguès; Maud Olivier; Monique Orphé; Michel Pajon; Luce Pane; Christian Paul; Rémi Pauvros; Germinal Peiro; Hervé Pellois; Jean-Claude Perez; Sylvie Pichot; Sébastien Pietrasanta; Martine Pinville; Christine Pirès-Beaune; Philippe Plisson; Élisabeth Pochon; Pascal Popelin; Émilienne Poumirol; Michel Pouzol; Patrice Prat; Joaquim Pueyo; Catherine Quéré; Valérie Rabault; Monique Rabin; Dominique Raimbourg; Marie Récalde; Marie-Line Reynaud; Eduardo Rihan Cypel; Denys Robiliard; Alain Rodet; Marcel Rogemont; Frédéric Roig; Barbara Romagnan; Bernard Roman; Gwendal Rouillard; René Rouquet; Alain Rousset; Boinali Saïd; Béatrice Santais; Odile Saugues; Gilbert Sauvan; Gilles Savary; Gérard Sebaoun; Christophe Sirugue; Julie Sommaruga; Suzanne Tallard; Pascal Terrasse; Gérard Terrier; Thomas Thévenoud; Sylvie Tolmont; Jean-Louis Touraine; Stéphane Travert; Catherine Troallic; Cécile Untermaier; Jean-Jacques Urvoas; Daniel Vaillant; Jacques Valax; Clotilde Valter; Michel Vauzelle; Olivier Véran; Fabrice Verdier; Michel Vergnier; Patrick Vignal; Jean-Michel Villaumé; Jean-Jacques Vlody; Paola Zanetti	4: Bernadette Laclais; Jérôme Lambert; Patrick Lebreton; Gabrielle Louis-Carabin	4: Marie-Françoise Bechtel; Jean-Luc Laurent; Jean-Philippe Mallé; Dominique Potier	2: François Pupponi; Hélène Vainqueur-Christophe
Union for a Popular Movement group	6: Benoist Apparu; Luc Chatel; Alain Chrétien; Marianne Dubois; Henri Guaino; Franck Riester	183: Damien Abad; Élie Aboud; Bernard Accoyer; Yves Albarello; Julien Aubert; Olivier Audibert-Troin; Patrick Balkany; Jean-Pierre Barbier; François Baroin; Jacques-Alain Bénisti; Sylvain Berrios; Xavier Bertrand; Étienne Blanc; Jean-Claude Bouchet; Valérie Boyer; Xavier Breton; Philippe Briand; Bernard Brochand; Dominique Bussereau; Olivier Carré; Gilles Carrez; Yves Censi; Jérôme Chartier; Gérard Cherpion; Guillaume Chevrollier; Jean-Louis Christ; Dino Cinieri; Éric Ciotti; Philippe Cochet; Jean-François Copé; François Cornut-Gentille; Édouard Courtial; Jean-Michel Couve; Marie-Christine Dalloz; Gérald Darmanin; Olivier Dassault; Marc-Philippe Daubresse; Bernard Debré; Jean-Pierre Decool; Bernard Deflesselles; Lucien Degauchy; Rémi Delatte; Patrick Devedjian; Nicolas Dhuicq; Sophie Dion; Jean-Pierre Door; Dominique Dord; David Douillet; Virginie Duby-Muller; Christian Estrosi; Daniel Fasquelle; Georges Fenech; François Fillon; Marie-Louise Fort; Yves Foulon; Yves Fromion; Laurent Furst; Claude de Ganay; Sauveur Gandolfi-Scheit; Hervé Gaymard; Annie Genevard; Guy Geoffroy; Bernard Gérard; Alain Gest; Daniel Gibbs; Franck Gilard; Georges Ginesta; Charles-Ange Ginésy; Jean-Pierre Giran; Claude Goasguen; Jean-Pierre Gorges; Philippe Gosselin; Philippe Goujon; Claude Greff; Anne Grommerch; Arlette Grosskost; Serge Grouard; Françoise Guégot; Jean-Claude Guibal; Jean-Jacques Guillet; Christophe Guilloteau; Michel Heinrich; Michel Herbillon; Antoine Herth; Patrick Hetzel; Philippe Houillon; Guénhaël Huet; Sébastien Huyghe; Christian Jacob; Denis Jacquat; Christian Kert; Jacques Kossowski; Patrick Labaune; Valérie Lacroute; Marc Laffineur; Jacques Lamblin; Jean-François Lamour; Laure de La Raudière; Guillaume Larrivé; Charles de La Verpillière; Thierry Lazaro; Alain Leboeuf; Isabelle Le Callennec; Marc Le Fur; Dominique Le Mèner; Jean Leonetti; Pierre Lequiller; Philippe Le Ray; Céleste Lett; Geneviève Levy; Véronique Louwagie; Lionnel Luca; Gilles Lurton; Jean-François Mancel; Alain Marc; Laurent Marcangeli; Thierry Mariani; Hervé Mariton; Alain Marleix; Olivier Marleix; Franck Marlin; Alain Marsaud; Philippe-Armand Martin; Patrice Martin-Lalande; Alain Marty; Jean-Claude Mathis; François de Mazières; Damien Meslot; Philippe Meunier; Jean-Claude Mignon; Pierre Morange; Pierre Morel-A-L'Huissier; Jean-Luc Moudenc; Alain Moyne-Bressand; Jacques Myard; Dominique Nachury; Yves Nicolin; Patrick Ollier; Valérie Pécresse; Jacques Pélissard; Bernard Perrut; Jean-Frédéric Poisson; Bérengère Poletti; Axel Poniatowski; Josette Pons; Christophe Priou; Didier Quentin; Frédéric Reiss; Jean-Luc Reitzer; Bernard Reynès; Arnaud Robinet; Camille de Rocca Serra; Sophie Rohfritsch; Martial Saddier; Paul Salen; François Scellier; Claudine Schmid; André Schneider; Jean-Marie Sermier; Fernand Siré; Thierry Solère; Michel Sordi; Éric Straumann; Claude Sturni; Alain Suguenot; Michèle Tabarot; Lionel Tardy; Jean-Charles Taugourdeau; Guy Teissier; Michel Terrot; Jean-Marie Tetart; Dominique Tian; François Vannson; Catherine Vautrin; Patrice Verchère; Jean-Sébastien Vialatte; Jean-Pierre Vigier; Philippe Vitel; Michel Voisin; Jean-Luc Warsmann; Laurent Wauquiez; Éric Woerth; Marie-Jo Zimmermann	5: Nicole Ameline; Nathalie Kosciusko-Morizet; Pierre Lellouche; Bruno Le Maire; Édouard Philippe	2: Marcel Bonnot; Marc Francina
Union of Democrats and Independents	5: Jean-Louis Borloo; Philippe Gomès; Yves Jégo; Jean-Christophe Lagarde; Sonia Lagarde	25: Thierry Benoit; Gilles Bourdouleix; Charles de Courson; Stéphane Demilly; Yannick Favennec; Philippe Folliot; Édouard Fritch; Jean-Christophe Fromantin; Francis Hillmeyer; Maurice Leroy; Hervé Morin; Bertrand Pancher; Michel Piron; Franck Reynier; Arnaud Richard; François Rochebloine; Rudy Salles; André Santini; François Sauvadet; Jonas Tahuaitu; Jean-Paul Tuaiva; Francis Vercamer; Philippe Vigier; François-Xavier Villain; Michel Zumkeller	–	–
Ecologist group	17: Laurence Abeille; Éric Alauzet; Brigitte Alain; Isabelle Attard; Danielle Auroi; Denis Baupin; Michèle Bonneton; Christophe Cavard; Sergio Coronado; François-Michel Lambert; Noël Mamère; Véronique Massonneau; Paul Molac; Barbara Pompili; Jean-Louis Roumégas; François de Rugy; Éva Sas	–	–	–
Radical, Republican, Democratic and Progressive	13: Thierry Braillard; Jean-Noël Carpentier; Jeanine Dubié; Olivier Falorni; Paul Giacobbi; Annick Girardin; Joël Giraud; Jacques Krabal; Jacques Moignard; Dominique Orliac; Stéphane Saint-André; Roger-Gérard Schwartzenberg; Alain Tourret	2: Ary Chalus; Thierry Robert	–	1: Gérard Charasse
Democratic and Republican Left group	9: François Asensi; Alain Bocquet; Marie-George Buffet; Jean-Jacques Candelier; Gaby Charroux; André Chassaigne; Marc Dolez; Jacqueline Fraysse; Nicolas Sansu	4: Bruno Nestor Azérot; Patrice Carvalho; Alfred Marie-Jeanne; Jean-Philippe Nilor	1: Gabriel Serville	1: Huguette Bello
Non-attached members	–	7: Véronique Besse; Jacques Bompard; Gilbert Collard; Nicolas Dupont-Aignan; Jean Lassalle; Marion Maréchal-Le Pen; Yannick Moreau	–	1: Napole Polutele
Total (Note: The National Assembly had 573 voting members at the time. Lot-et-Garonne's 3rd constituency and the first and eighth legislative constituencies for French citizens abroad were vacant until June 2013. In addition, the President of the National Assembly, Claude Bartolone, votes only in case of a tied vote.)	331	225	10	7
Total	57.8%	39.3%	1.7%	1.4%

The same-sex marriage law is commonly referred to in France as "the Taubira law" (la loi Taubira) in reference to Justice Minister Christiane Taubira who introduced the bill to the French Assembly in November 2012 and was the bill's main sponsor. The law amended Article 143 (Book I, Title V, Chapter I) of the Napoleonic Code to state: Marriage is contracted by two persons of different or of the same sex. (Note: French: Le mariage est contracté par deux personnes de sexe différent ou de même sexe.)

In French, same-sex marriage is known as mariage entre personnes de même sexe or more commonly as mariage pour tous (pronounced [maʁjaʒ puʁ tus], meaning "marriage for all"). (Note: In some regional languages: Alsatian: Eha fer àlla; Basque: ezkontza guztiontzat; Breton: dimeziñ evit an holl; Catalan: matrimoni per a tots; Corsican: matrimoniu per tutti; Franco-Provençal: mariâjo por tôs; Marquesan: te hunona no te paotū; Occitan: maridatge per totes; Picard: mariage pour tertous; Tahitian: te faʼaipoiporaʼa nō te tāʼātoʼaraʼa; West Flemish: echt vo olleman) The term "marriage for all" is widely used in public discourse and in French media.

==== Reactions and subsequent changes ====
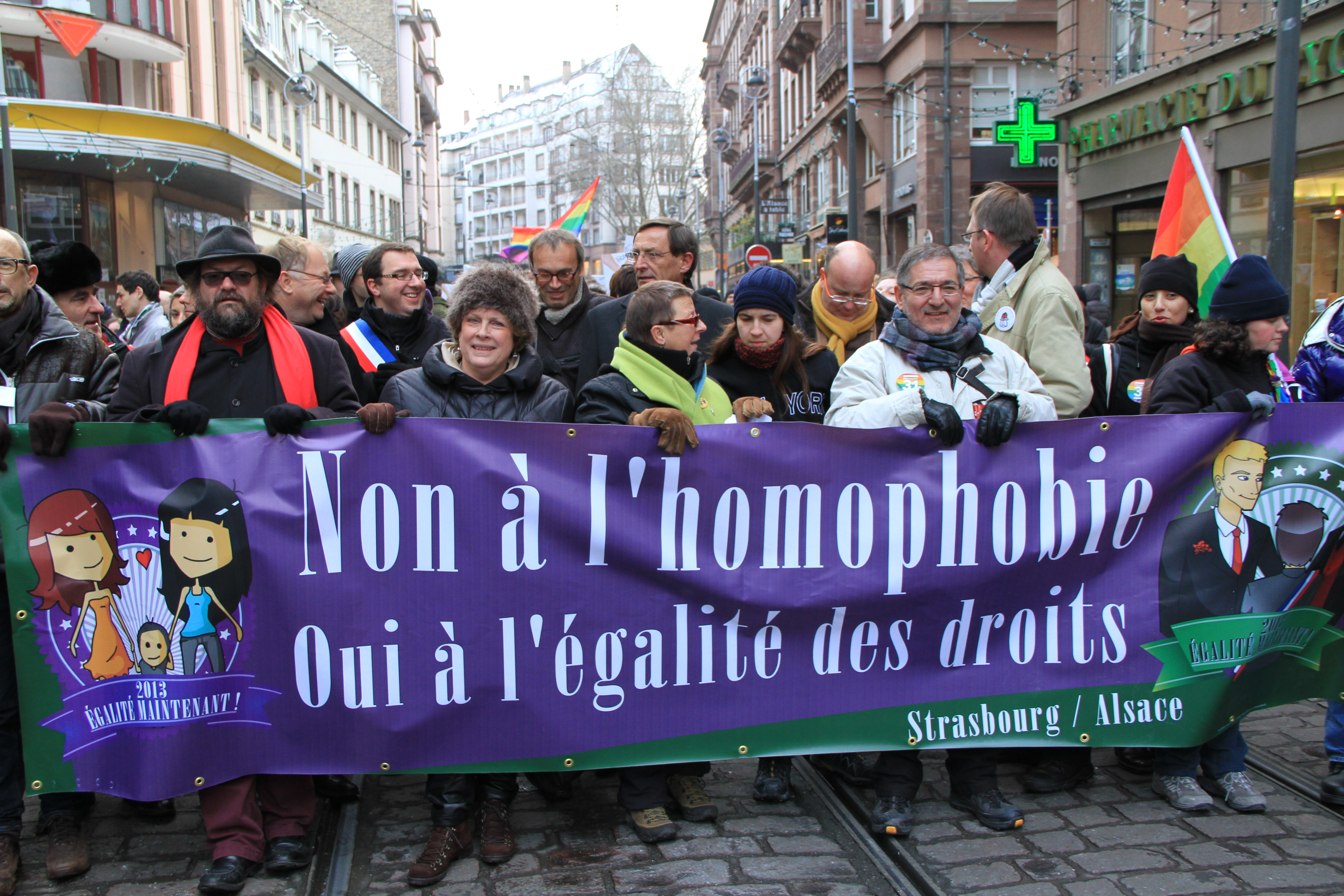
Supporters of same-sex marriage campaigning in Strasbourg, 19 January 2013

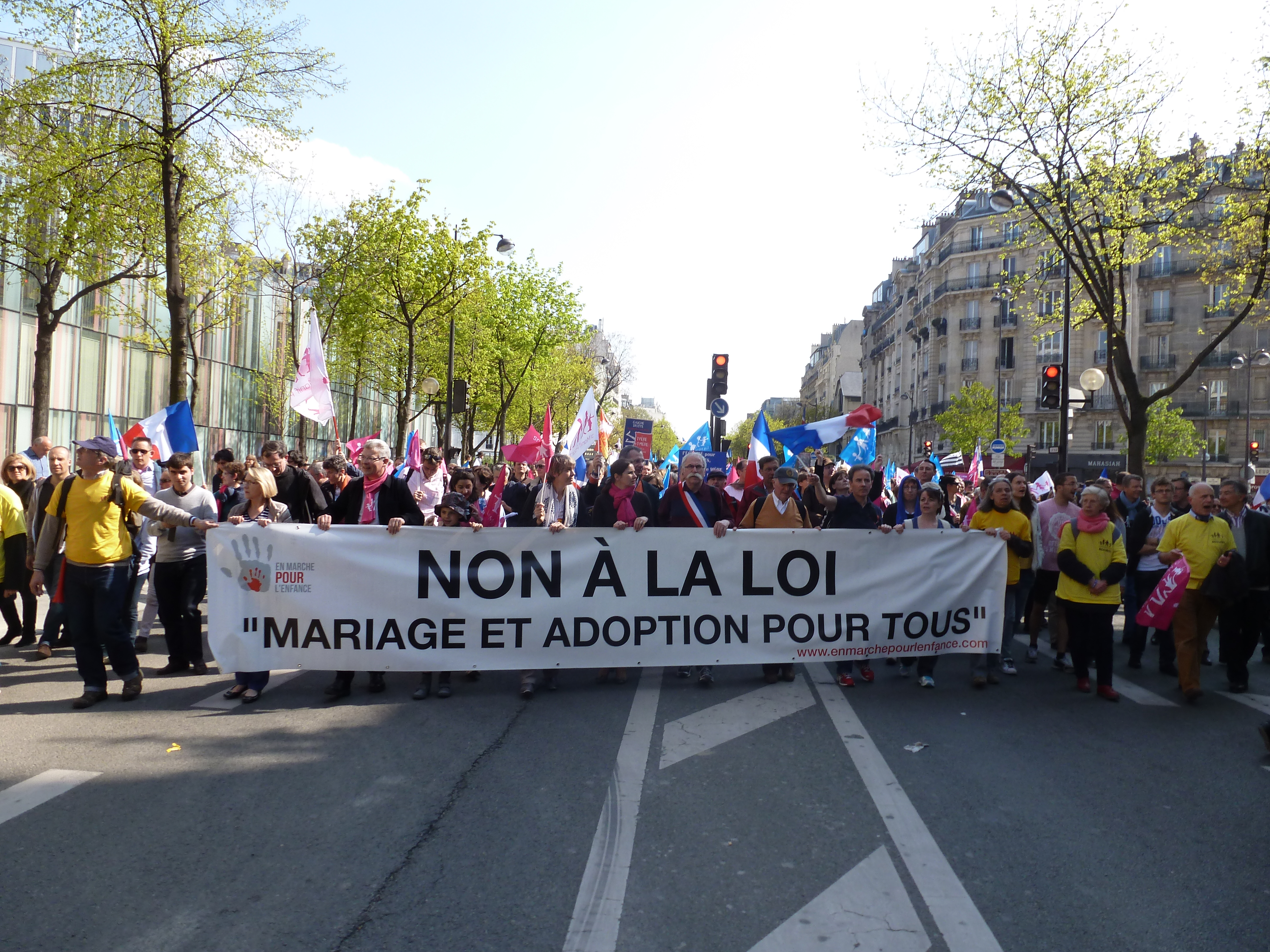
Opponents of same-sex marriage at a rally against the law, Paris, 21 April 2013

The opposition Union for a Popular Movement party immediately filed a challenge against the law with the Constitutional Council. On 17 May 2013, the Council declared the law constitutional. The same day, President François Hollande promulgated the bill, which was officially published on 18 May 2013 in the Journal Officiel de la République Française. The first same-sex marriage to be recognized in France was that of Dominique Adamski and Francis Dekens, who had their marriage performed in Belgium in 2006 registered in Cayeux-sur-Mer on 23 May. The first official same-sex wedding ceremony took place on 29 May in the city of Montpellier between Vincent Autin and Bruno Boileau. The ceremony was conducted by Mayor Hélène Mandroux. The first same-sex marriage between two women took place on 1 June in Saint-Jean-de-la-Ruelle.

In June 2013, the French Government issued a circulaire stipulating a maximum sentence of 5 years' imprisonment and a fine of 75,000€ for any mayor or local official who refuses to perform a marriage for a same-sex couple on the sole basis of their sexual orientation. The official may also face discrimination charges under Article 432-7 of the Criminal Code. In October 2013, the Constitutional Council dismissed a lawsuit challenging the circulaire, ruling that it did not violate the French Constitution. The court wrote in its ruling that the circulaire "ensures a good enforcement of the law and guarantees neutrality from the state". In October 2018, the European Court of Human Rights dismissed an appeal from 146 mayors in the case. In September 2015, a court in Marseille sentenced Sabrina Hout to five months' imprisonment for having refused to perform a same-sex marriage back in August 2014. Hout, who served as deputy mayor in Marseille, had been scheduled to conduct the marriage on 16 August but said she was not feeling fell and asked a local council member to perform the marriage instead. However, the council member did not have the legal authority to perform the marriage and it was later invalidated. Hout officiated at four opposite-sex marriages that same day.

In July 2018, MP Guillaume Chiche introduced a bill to legalise assisted reproduction for married and unmarried lesbian couples and single women. In June 2019, Prime Minister Édouard Philippe told the National Assembly that the government intended to have the legislation examined in the Assembly from the end of September 2019. The bill was adopted in its first reading by the National Assembly on 15 October 2019 by a vote of 359–114. It passed its second reading on 31 July 2020 by 60 votes to 37 (the low turnout being due to most Assembly members having gone on summer holidays). The Senate approved the bill in first reading on 4 February 2020 by 153 votes to 143 with 45 abstentions. The proposal would also foresee the state covering the cost of the assisted reproduction procedures for all women under 43 and allow children born with donated sperm to find out their donor's identity when they reach the age of 18. The bill passed its final reading in the French Parliament on 29 June, and came into effect in September 2021.

There has been little political movement to abrogate the same-sex marriage law, despite some politicians, including the 2017 presidential candidate for the National Rally, Marine Le Pen, expressly calling for its repeal. Former President Nicolas Sarkozy said he favored repealing the law in 2014, but said in a 2016 interview that he had changed his mind, calling a repeal "unjust, cruel and legally impossible". In 2017, the party president of The Republicans (previously the UMP), Laurent Wauquiez, said he opposed repealing the law, and in June 2019 the vice president of the National Rally, Jordan Bardella, said the matter was "settled". While running in the 2022 presidential election, Le Pen said she also opposed repealing the law, tweeting on 15 April 2022, "I will not take rights away from French citizens. Marriage for all will remain if I am elected President of the French Republic".

==== Scope ====
There had been initial confusion over whether the act applied to nationals of Algeria, Bosnia and Herzegovina, Cambodia, Kosovo, Laos, Montenegro, Morocco, Poland, Serbia, Slovenia or Tunisia, as it breached bilateral agreements stipulating that the law of those countries applies rather than French law. The Court of Cassation ruled that it does in September 2015, finding the provisions excluding these countries discriminatory and contrary to French law.

=== Historical and customary recognition in Overseas France ===
While Polynesian and Mayotte cultures historically practiced polygamy, there are no records of same-sex marriages being performed in these cultures in the way they are commonly defined in Western legal systems. However, many of these communities recognize identities and relationships that may be placed on the LGBT spectrum. For example, in the Society Islands of French Polynesia, as well as in other Polynesian cultures, there exists people who fulfill a traditional, spiritual and social third gender role. They are known as māhū (pronounced [ˈmaːhuː]) in Tahitian. The māhū are assigned male at birth but express themselves as women. "Being outside of the traditional male-female divide", they are raised as girls from early childhood, carry out women's work in the home and the community, and historically often served as domestic servants of the nobility. The māhū are considered an integral part of Tahitian society; "Māhū were not merely tolerated; they were regarded as a legitimate and contributory part of the ancient Polynesian community." They have been known to Europeans since the 18th century, with William Bligh, the captain of HMS Bounty, having noted the presence of "men with great marks of effeminacy". Historically, if they wished to marry and have children, they would marry women. The māhū status thus created the possibility for marriages between two female-presenting individuals to be performed in Tahitian culture. In Mayotte, the sarambavi occupy a similar cultural role, and are "relatively well integrated into Mayotte society". They choose to obey the "law of women", and can use the mbiwi, claves reserved for women, during traditional dances. However, it is unknown if the sarambavi were historically allowed to marry.

In Wallisian culture, people who occupy a similar third gender role are known as fakafafine (pronounced [fakafaˈfine]), and it is likely that "they have always existed" on Wallis. Assigned male at birth, they express themselves as women and carry out women's work in the community. They are also known as fakafafine in Futunan. This structure is similar to the faʻafafine of Samoa. They are known as fagafafine in West Uvean, ʼakavaʼine in Rapa, ʼakaʼaʼine in Mangareva, and hakavahīne in Tuamotuan, though māhū is also used. In the Marquesas Islands, people born as male but expressing themselves as women are referred to as piivehine (pronounced [piːveˈhine]), while people born as female but expressing themselves as men are referred to as piivahana (pronounced [piːvaˈhana]). Some sources also use the terms haatūmātua and haatūmāùi, respectively. They are reportedly a "common sight" in the Marquesas. French sociologist Laure Hins Grépin reported in 2005 that piivehine had sexual intercourse primarily with "openly macho" cisgender men, but did not say whether they were historically allowed to marry.

=== Statistics ===
In 2013, 7,367 same-sex couples were legally married in France, accounting for approximately 3% of all marriages performed in that time, with three out of every five same-sex marriages involving male couples. 10,522 same-sex marriages took place in France in 2014, in around 6,000 communes, representing 4% of all marriages performed that year. Male couples accounted for about 54% of these marriages, while female couples accounted for the remaining 46%. 1,331 same-sex couples married in Paris, comprising 13.5% of the total number of weddings performed in the city that year. By 23 April 2018, five years after the French Parliament had approved the same-sex marriage law, approximately 40,000 same-sex couples had married in the country. This represented about 3.5% of all marriages performed during that time. The departments with the highest share of same-sex marriages were Paris (9.7%), Calvados (5.6%), Charente-Maritime (5.4%), Hérault (5.1%), Orne (4.8%), Alpes-de-Haute-Provence (4.6%), Alpes-Maritimes (4.5%) and Lot (4.4%), whereas the departments with the lowest shares were Guadeloupe (0.3%), Mayotte (0.6%), Martinique (0.6%), French Guiana (1%), Haute-Corse (1.1%), Réunion (1.2%), Ariège (1.5%) and Corse-du-Sud (1.6%).

Number of marriages and unions performed in France
Year	Same-sex marriages	Total marriages	Same-sex PACS	Total PACS
2013	7,367	238,592	6,093	168,692
2014	10,522	241,292	6,262	173,731
2015	7,751	236,316	7,017	188,947
2016	7,113	232,725	7,112	191,537
2017	7,244	233,915	7,400	195,633
2018	6,386	234,735	8,589	208,871
2019	6,272	224,740	8,356	196,370
2020	4,598	154,581	7,983	173,894
2021	6,406	218,819	9,810	209,461
2022	6,869	241,710	9,923	202,566
2023	6,614	248,080	10,176	196,132
2024	6,746	248,174	10,389	197,176

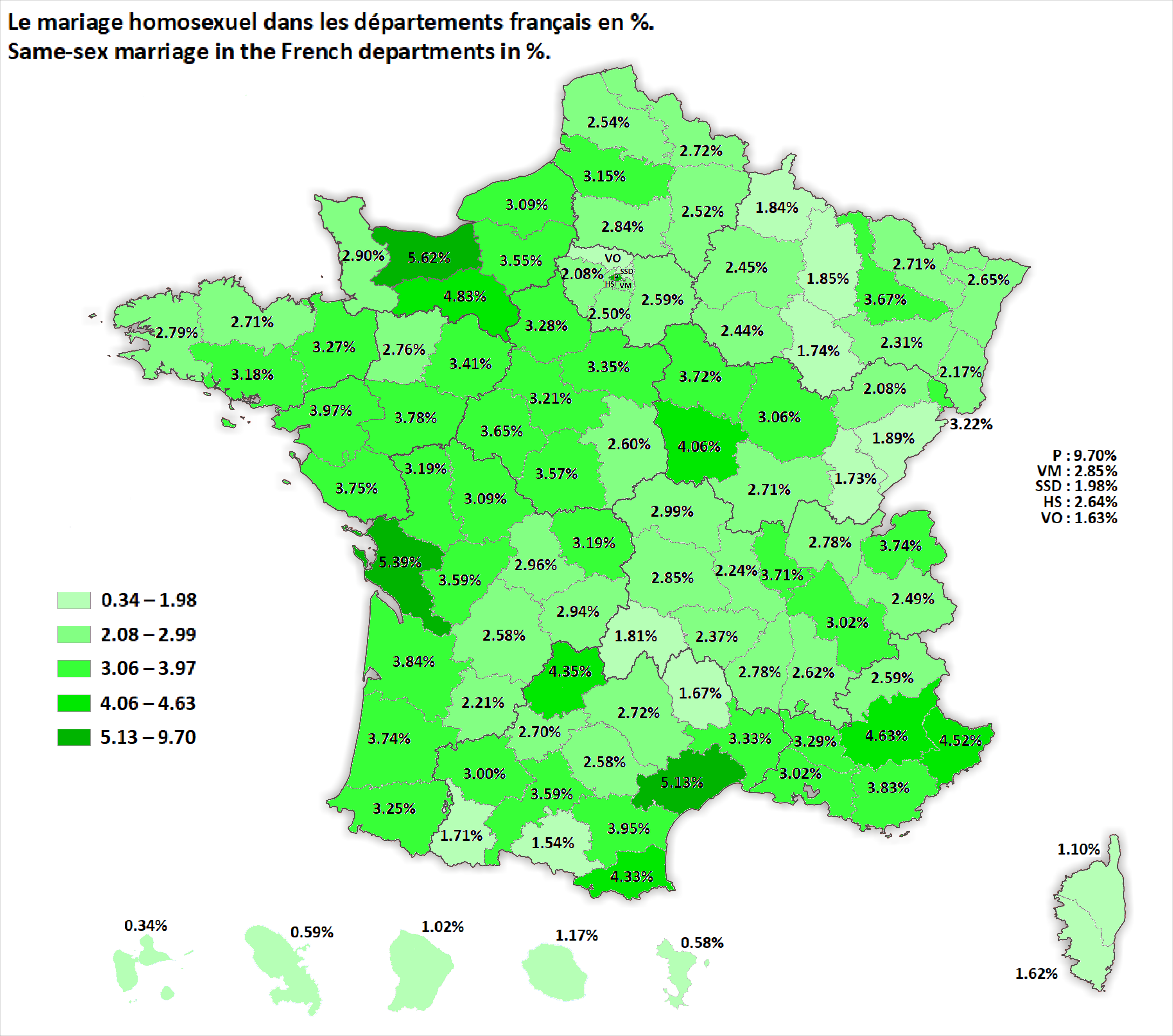
Map showing the percentage of same-sex marriages in France by department, 2014–2018. The overseas departments recorded far lower percentages than metropolitan France.

A lesbian couple, Rosemonde Zébo and Myriam Jourdan, became the first same-sex couple to marry in Martinique in June 2013. The couple were married in Le Carbet in a ceremony alongside family, friends and well-wishers. The first same-sex wedding in Guadeloupe occurred in July 2013 in Saint-Anne between Eric Dandler and Serge Willame. The first couple to marry in Saint Barthélemy did so in August 2013 in Gustavia. In French Guiana, the first marriage took place in August 2013 in the city of Saint-Laurent-du-Maroni. By April 2018, 12 same-sex couples had married in the capital city of Cayenne. In Saint Martin, the first same-sex marriage was performed in October 2013 and officiated by politician Guillaume Arnell. The couple had rocks thrown at them and received homophobic insults as they left city hall. The first same-sex marriage in Saint Pierre and Miquelon occurred in March 2014.

In Réunion, the first same-sex marriage was performed for a lesbian couple, Laurence Serveaux and Corinne Denis, in Saint-Paul in June 2013. By July 2015, 93 same-sex couples had married on the island. In Mayotte, the first same-sex wedding was performed in September 2013 for a French-Cuban couple in Mamoudzou. The marriage was performed by Mayor Abdourahamane Soilihi, a vocal opponent of same-sex marriage. This marked the first time in modern history that a legally recognized same-sex marriage had occurred in a jurisdiction where a majority of the population follows the religion of Islam. The first marriage between a male Maorais couple was performed in March 2015. In 2022, a couple from the town of Kani-Kéli were denied the right to marry on multiple occasions. The couple were initially scheduled to get married on 12 February after months of planning, but the mayor later postponed the ceremony to 14 February, before postponing it again onto several successive dates. They accused the mayor of being "scared" of performing the marriage. Media reported that the couple had successfully married by May 2023. Between 2013 and May 2023, 560 same-sex marriages were performed in Mamoudzou. The first same-sex marriage in French Polynesia took place in Haapiti, Moʻorea in July 2013. The couple who had wished for a quiet ceremony were harassed by a group of opponents of same-sex marriage. By February 2014, 11 same-sex marriages had occurred in New Caledonia, representing 1.7% of all marriages, with 9 of these being performed in the South Province and the remaining 2 in the North Province. The first same-sex marriage in the North Province was performed in Poindimié in September 2013. The same-sex marriage law does not apply to individuals governed under Kanak customary law, which recognises Kanak customs for contracts, land, family and persons. If a Kanak same-sex couple wishes to marry, they would need to renounce their customary law status and ask to be governed under French civil law.

Overall, relatively few same-sex marriages have been performed in the overseas departments and territories compared to metropolitan France. According to a 2018 report, eight same-sex marriages had been performed in Saint Barthélemy, five in French Polynesia, four in Saint Martin, two in Saint Pierre and Miquelon and one in Wallis and Futuna since legalization.

=== Religious performance ===
In May 2015, the United Protestant Church of France voted to allow its pastors to bless same-sex marriages. The measure, which was passed by 94 votes to 3, also includes a freedom of conscience clause allowing pastors with objections to opt out. A marriage between two lesbian pastors was celebrated in a Protestant church in Montpellier in July 2021. The assembly of the Union of Protestant Churches of Alsace and Lorraine voted in November 2019 by 36 votes to 13 to allow its pastors to bless same-sex marriages. The measure also includes a freedom of conscience clause for pastors opposed to blessing same-sex relationships.

Other religious denominations also perform and bless same-sex marriages, including Old Catholic churches, Breton Druid groups (Ordre Druidique de Dahut), and Buddhist groups. The first Buddhist same-sex marriage in France occurred in 1995 near Paris between Fabrice Midal and Bruno Tyszler. On 18 February 2012, Ludovic-Mohamed Zahed married his South African partner Qiyaammudeen Jantjies-Zahed in a religious ceremony in Sevran, marking the first Muslim same-sex wedding in France. The marriage was officiated by an imam, but proved controversial in Muslim circles.

The Catholic Church opposes same-sex marriage and does not allow its priests to officiate at such marriages. In December 2023, the Holy See published Fiducia supplicans, a declaration allowing Catholic priests to bless couples who are not considered to be married according to church teaching, including the blessing of same-sex couples. The Bishop of Bayonne, Lescar and Oloron, Marc Aillet, reacted to the declaration, "I invite them [priests], if the people ask for it, to give them [same-sex couples] a blessing, provided it's to each person individually, calling them to conversion and inviting them to ask for the help of the grace that the Lord grants to all those who ask him to conform their lives to God's will." Bishops of the Ecclesiastical Province of Rennes said, "It is appropriate to spontaneously bless, individually, each of the two persons forming a couple, whatever their sexual orientation, who humbly ask God's blessing, with the desire to conform more and more to his holy will."

== Public opinion ==
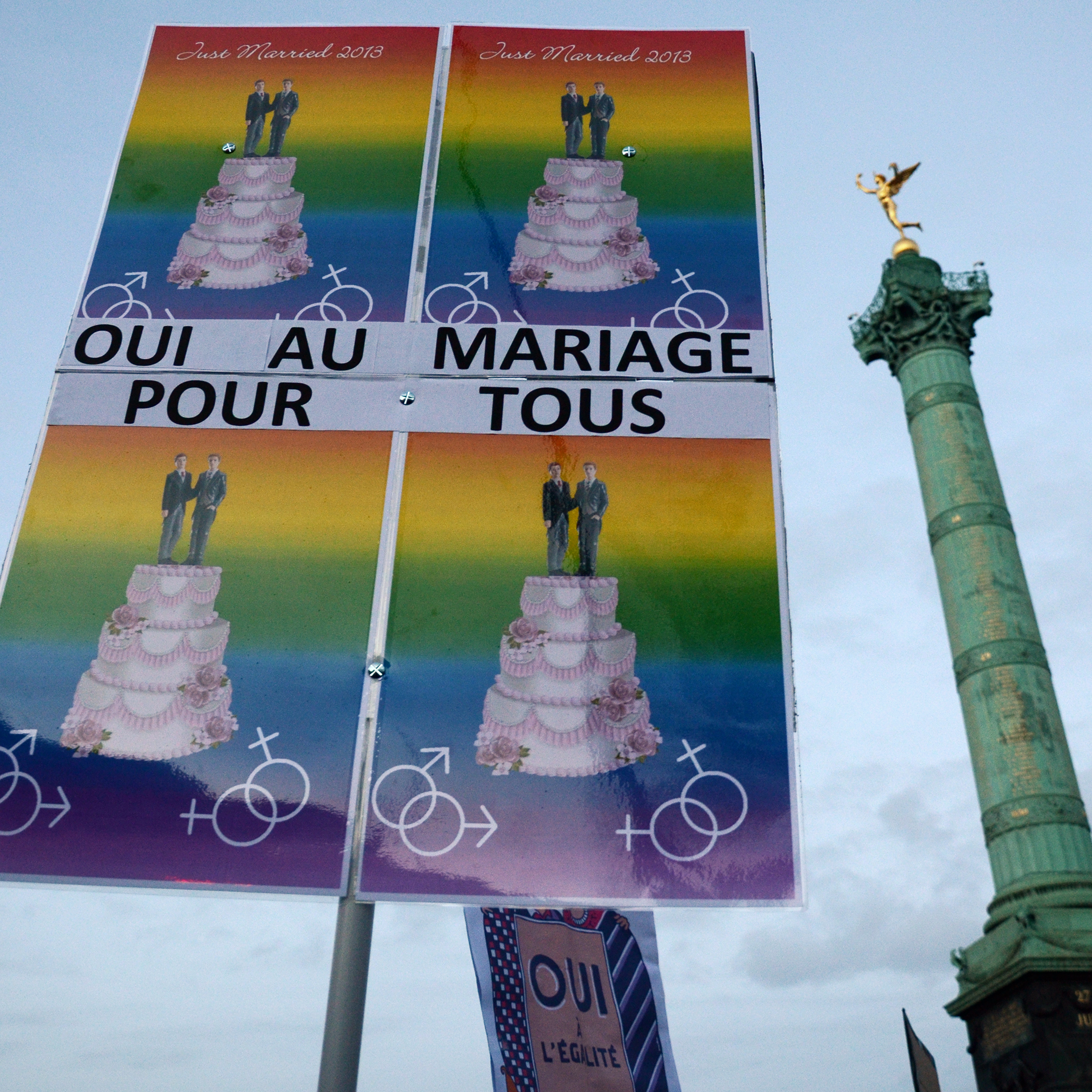
Protest sign at a demonstration in favour of same-sex marriage in Paris, 27 January 2013

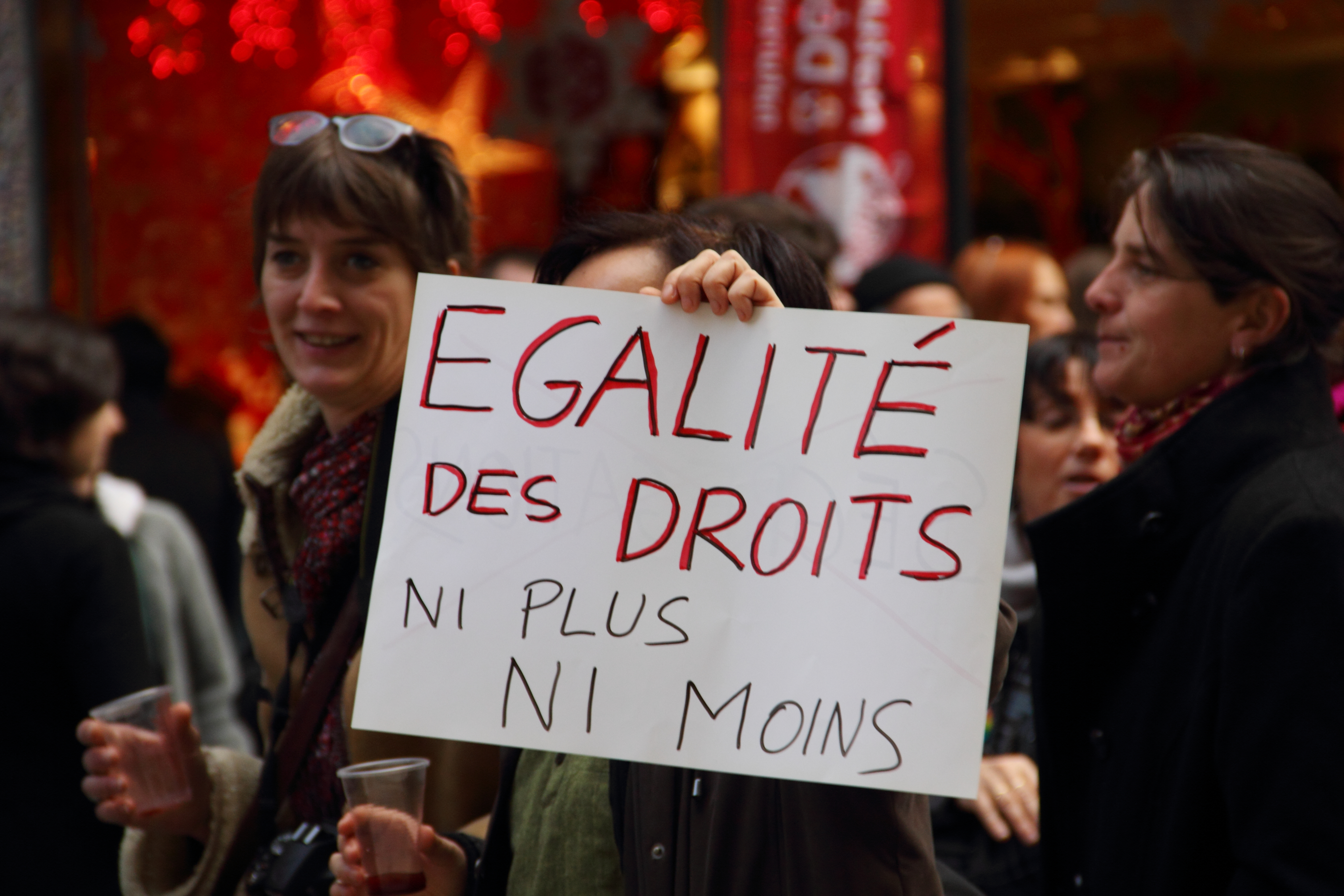
Sign calling for equal rights for all couples in Toulouse, 16 December 2012

Support for same-sex marriage among 18–21-year-olds according to a 2016 survey from the Varkey Foundation

A 1996 Ifop poll found that 48% of French people supported same-sex marriage, with 33% opposed. A 2003 Gallup poll showed that support had increased to 58%, while a May 2004 Ipsos poll put support at 57%, with 38% opposed. Younger people were particularly in favour, with 75% of those under 35 in support. Nevertheless, only 40% were in favour of same-sex adoption rights, though 56% of those younger than 35 were in support. A 2004 Ifop poll showed that 64% of respondents were in support of same-sex marriage, with 49% supporting adoption rights.

The 2006 Eurobarometer survey found that 48% of French people supported same-sex marriage being allowed throughout Europe. This was 4% above the EU average. Support for adoption rights was at 35%, 3% above the EU average. A 2006 Ipsos poll found that 61% of the population favoured the recognition of civil marriage for same-sex couples, whereas a June 2006 Taylor Nelson Sofres poll found that 45% of respondents supported same-sex marriage, with 51% opposed. 36% supported adoption rights for same-sex couples. A June 2008 Ifop poll put support for same-sex marriage in France at 62%, with 38% in opposition. 51% supported adoption rights. Support for same-sex marriage was very high among younger people, with 77% of those aged between 25 and 34 in favour.

A November 2009 BVA Group poll showed that 64% of the French public was in favour of same-sex marriage, including for the first time a majority of right-wing voters. 57% supported adoption rights, with support being 68% among those between 18 and 25 years old. A July 2010 poll from Crédoc (Centre de recherche pour l'étude et l'observation des conditions de vie) showed that 61% of respondents supported same-sex marriage, and 48% supported adoption rights. In January 2011, Taylor Nelson Sofres estimated that support for same-sex marriage stood at 58%, while 35% were opposed. Support was 74% among those under the age of 35. 49% supported adoption rights for same-sex couples. An Ifop poll conducted in June 2011 found that 63% of respondents were in favour of same-sex marriage, and 58% supported adoption rights for same-sex couples. A December 2011 BVA Group poll found that 63% of respondents supported same-sex marriage, and 56% supported adoption rights for same-sex couples.

An August 2012 Ifop poll found that 65% of the population was in favour of same-sex marriage, and 53% supported adoption rights for same-sex couples, while another Ifop poll conducted in October found that 61% of respondents were in favour of same-sex marriage, and 48% supported adoption rights for same-sex couples. An October 2012 BVA Group poll found that 58% of French people supported same-sex marriage, and 50% supported adoption rights for same-sex couples. A CSA Institute poll conducted in December 2012 found that 54% of respondents were in favour of same-sex marriage, and 48% supported adoption rights for same-sex couples, while an Ifop survey conducted that same month showed that 60% of respondents were in favour of same-sex marriage, and 46% supported adoption rights for same-sex couples. A December 2012–January 2013 YouGov poll found that 47% of the French public was in favour of same-sex marriage, and 38% supported adoption rights for same-sex couples.

Two January 2013 Ifop polls found that 60% and 63% of French people were in favour of same-sex marriage, and 46% and 49% supported adoption rights for same-sex couples. Another poll conducted that same month by OpinionWay showed that 57% of the French public supported same-sex marriage, and 45% supported adoption rights for same-sex couples. A February 2013 Ifop poll put support for same-sex marriage in France at 66%, and support for adoption rights at 47%. This increased to 58% and 47%, respectively, according to an April 2013 BVA Group poll. Two Ifop surveys conducted in April 2013 while the same-sex marriage bill was under discussion in the French Parliament placed support for the bill at 51% and 53%. A May 2013 Ipsos poll found that 51% of respondents were in favour of same-sex marriage and another 29% supported other forms of recognition for same-sex couples. Two more Ifop opinion polls conducted in May estimated that support for same-sex marriage in France stood at 52% and 53%.

Support for same-sex marriage has increased since the same-sex marriage law was enacted. A February 2014 BVA Group poll found that 61% of respondents were in favour of same-sex marriage and 50% were in favour of adoption rights for same-sex couples, while a survey by the same polling organization in April 2014 put support for same-sex marriage at 55% and for adoption rights at 48%. A September 2014 iTélé poll showed that 73% of respondents including 56% of those who support the Union for a Popular Movement would oppose the repeal of same-sex marriage, whereas a September–October 2014 Ifop poll showed that 57% of respondents were against repealing the law allowing same-sex couples to marry and adopt children. A November 2014 Ifop/Atlantico poll found that 68% of French people supported same-sex marriage and 53% supported adoption rights for same-sex couples.

The 2015 Eurobarometer survey found that 71% of French people thought same-sex marriage should be allowed throughout Europe, while 24% were opposed. A June 2015 BVA Group poll showed that 67% of respondents were in favour of same-sex marriage, 64% were against revising the 2013 law and 57% were in favour of adoption rights for same-sex couples. An August 2016 Ifop poll for the Association of Homosexual Families (ADFH) found that 65% of the public opposed repealing the 2013 same-sex marriage law. A September–October 2016 survey by the Varkey Foundation found that 74% of 18–21-year-olds supported same-sex marriage in France.

A Pew Research Center poll, conducted between April and August 2017 and published in May 2018, showed that 73% of French people supported same-sex marriage, while 23% were opposed and 4% did not know or had refused to answer. When divided by religion, 85% of religiously unaffiliated people, 78% of non-practicing Christians and 59% of church-attending Christians supported same-sex marriage. Opposition to same-sex marriage was 17% among 18–34-year-olds. The 2019 Eurobarometer found that 79% of French people thought same-sex marriage should be allowed throughout Europe, while 15% were opposed. The EU average was 69%. Support had increased to 82% according to a Pew Research Center poll conducted between February and May 2023. 14% of the population was opposed and 4% did not know or had refused to answer. When divided by political affiliation, support was highest among those at the center of the political spectrum at 86%, followed by those on the left at 85% and those on the right at 77%. Women (86%) were also more likely to support same-sex marriage than men (79%). The 2023 Eurobarometer showed that support was 79%, while 14% were opposed. The survey also found that 84% of French people thought that "there is nothing wrong in a sexual relationship between two persons of the same sex", while 12% disagreed.

== See also ==
- Civil solidarity pact
- LGBT rights in France
- La Manif pour tous
- Recognition of same-sex unions in Europe
