= Saandati Moussa =

Mahorese singer

Saandati Moussa is a Mahorese singer-songwriter.

== Biography ==
Saandati Moussa was born in Mamoudzou on the island of Grande-Terre, in Mayotte, to Mayotte parents.

Saandati Moussa started singing at the age of 15 with the debaa. She joined Tsararano's Imania training. In 1998 in Marseille, she joined the group Ramandzaka, which devoted itself to the music of Mayotte.

And it is from there that Saandati began to compose. In 2005, she joined the Racine de Tsararano association. She has been its president ever since. In addition to the main objective of this group, composed mainly of young people, Saan-dati promotes traditional songs and dances. She is the author and composer of all of Racine's songs. Saandati collaborates with many local artists: Jean-Raymond Cudza, Lima Wild, Zainouni and Zily.

After the birth of her first child in 2001, Saandati returned to metropolitan France, to Montpellier then in 2005, decided to return to live permanently in her native country.

In 2014, she was elected "Best Mahoraise artist" during the Voice of the Indian Ocean ceremony in Saint-Denis-la-Réunion.

== Discography ==
- 2011 : M'Trumama karémwa

== Awards and nominations ==
Year	Award	Category	Result
2014	Voice of the Indian Ocean	Best Artist from Mayotte	Won
