= Culture of Mayotte =

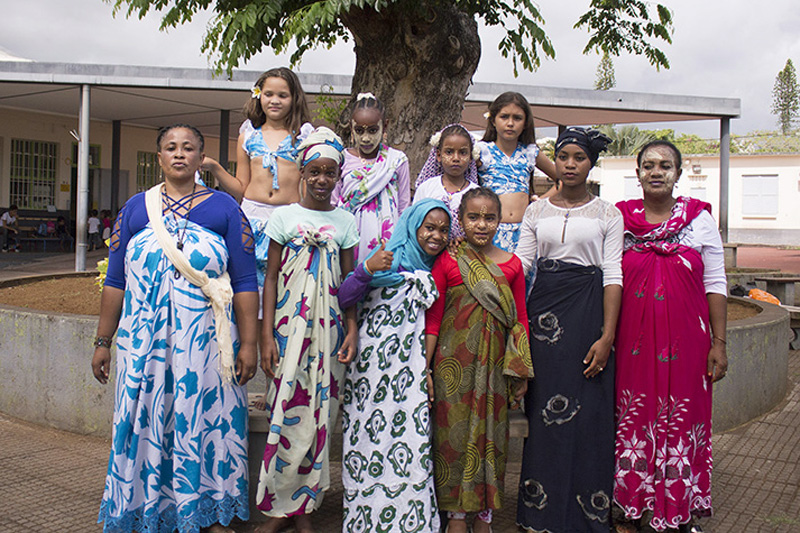
Mayan women and girls pose in groups. They wear the traditional colored salouva of Mayotte and for some a matching kichalle; their arms are covered by a cotton bodysuit. They are made up, but only the woman on the right and the young girls have patterns on their faces, drawn with msindzano.

The culture of Mayotte is characterized by the diversity of the cultural practices of its inhabitants (256,518, 2017 estimate). Mayotte's culture is the result of crossings of populations for centuries, it is the result of a very rich mixture. This mixture is reflected in the music, song and dance. The island has a great musical and choreographic tradition linked to Arab-Muslim culture.

The Mahorese culture is also close to the Sakalava culture (North West of Madagascar). Kibushi, a language of Malagasy origin, is the mother tongue of approximately 30% of the population, Mayotte thus representing the most western territory of the Austronesian linguistic and cultural area. Recent archaeological work has demonstrated the historical presence of these traditions from the ninth century, and again in the twelfth century in the graves (Accoua and civilization of Dembeni), or in everyday objects.

== Traditions ==
- Debaa
- Mbiwi
- Biyaya
- Dahira
- Maoulida
- Chigoma
- Magandja
- Moringue
- Salouva
- Msindzano
- Banga
- Wadaha

== Religions ==
Islam, established in Mayotte since the 15th century, occupies a major place in the organization and culture of society. Around 95% of the population of Mayotte are Muslims.

Local law inspired by Muslim law and African and Malagasy customs applies only to those Mahorais who have retained their personal status, as permitted by article 75 of the Constitution. The law of July 11, 2001 relating to Mayotte maintains the existence of this civil status under local law and specifies the possibilities for renouncing it in favor of the civil status under common law.

== Clothing ==
Although young people wear Western style clothing, traditional clothing is still common among adults. While in town, a Mahorais man will typically wear a white cotton garment and a length shirt, sometimes with a white jacket and white skull cap. Out of town, a long cloth sarong (colorful skirt) is worn. Most women wear traditional coloured salouva or western outfits.

== Cuisine ==
- Mataba: is made from cassava bredes (leaves) simmered in coconut milk. It is most often used for the evening meal. The preparation is long because of the need to pound the brèdes with a mortar and pestle. This dish is therefore generally used during ceremonies, but rarely on the daily menu. It looks like creamed spinach, but more digestible.
- Chahoula ya nadzi: is rice boiled in water or coconut milk. A real basic dish, it is generally served for large meals, to feed the many children or during festive meals. In the latter case, curdled milk is added to the rice. It is an absolutely compulsory dish during ceremonies such as circumcision, debbah, maoulida, the Grand Marriage and mourning in the village.
- Kangué: is a dish made from beef boiled until all the cooking water is used up. The name means that the meat was cooked by broth.
- Batabata: These are green bananas or cassava, breadfruit boiled in oil. Green bananas are used as vegetables. There are more than thirty different bananas on the island, including ten bananas to cook. Not to be confused with yellow bananas, a fruit that is little used in the Mahorese diet, except by children, M'zungus or Mahorais, between meals, never during.
- The mtsolola: It is prepared from green bananas cut into squares, that is to say, split in half lengthwise and crosswise. Then mixed with meat or fried fish, they simmer in the pot with the usual accompaniments such as lemon, tomato and salt.
- Pilao: is a rice-based party dish in which we find diced meat and many spices such as cardamom, cloves, pepper, cinnamon, etc. A "luxury" dish, it is sometimes served in some local restaurants and is sufficient on its own. It is in a way the Mahorese paella.
- Romazava: national dish of Madagascar, it is also cooked in Mayotte. It is a meat broth in which Mafanes brèdes have simmered which give the sensation of anesthesia or freshness to the tongue. Mancarara is a festive cake that is prepared for ceremonies, a cookie made from flour and coconut milk. The dough obtained is spread out then cooked on a pan in hot oil, having taken care to fold the dough to make numerous beads.
- Chari: is a mixture of tomatoes or green papaya with tamarind, cooked with onions, pepper and cumin.
- The kakamkou: is a soup made from fish, tomatoes, lemon, chili.
- Restaurants: There are many restaurants serving French cuisine or Indian Ocean influences in Mayotte. They function thanks to tourism and especially to the presence of many metropolitan officials. Numerous in Petite-Terre and Mamoudzou, they are less and less as one moves away from the city. In general, the big hotels often also have restaurants. Street food, fast food. In Mayotte, they are called mamas brochettes. These mamas serve, on every street corner in the villages, zebu skewers grilled on site, accompanied by fried bananas and cassava. They are unfortunately suspended with the departmentalization which would impose health standards condemning them. In the winter season, they will offer grilled corn. In bakeries, there are inexpensive sandwiches and ham and butter. On Mamoudzou-Petite-Terre, there are snack shops and pizzerias.
- Picnic: The picnic on the beach generally included kebabs or grilled fish.
- Drinks: Alcohol is not prohibited anywhere. Only drunkenness in public is not recommended. Moderation is generally the most common behavior.
