= The arts =

Creative human and cultural expression

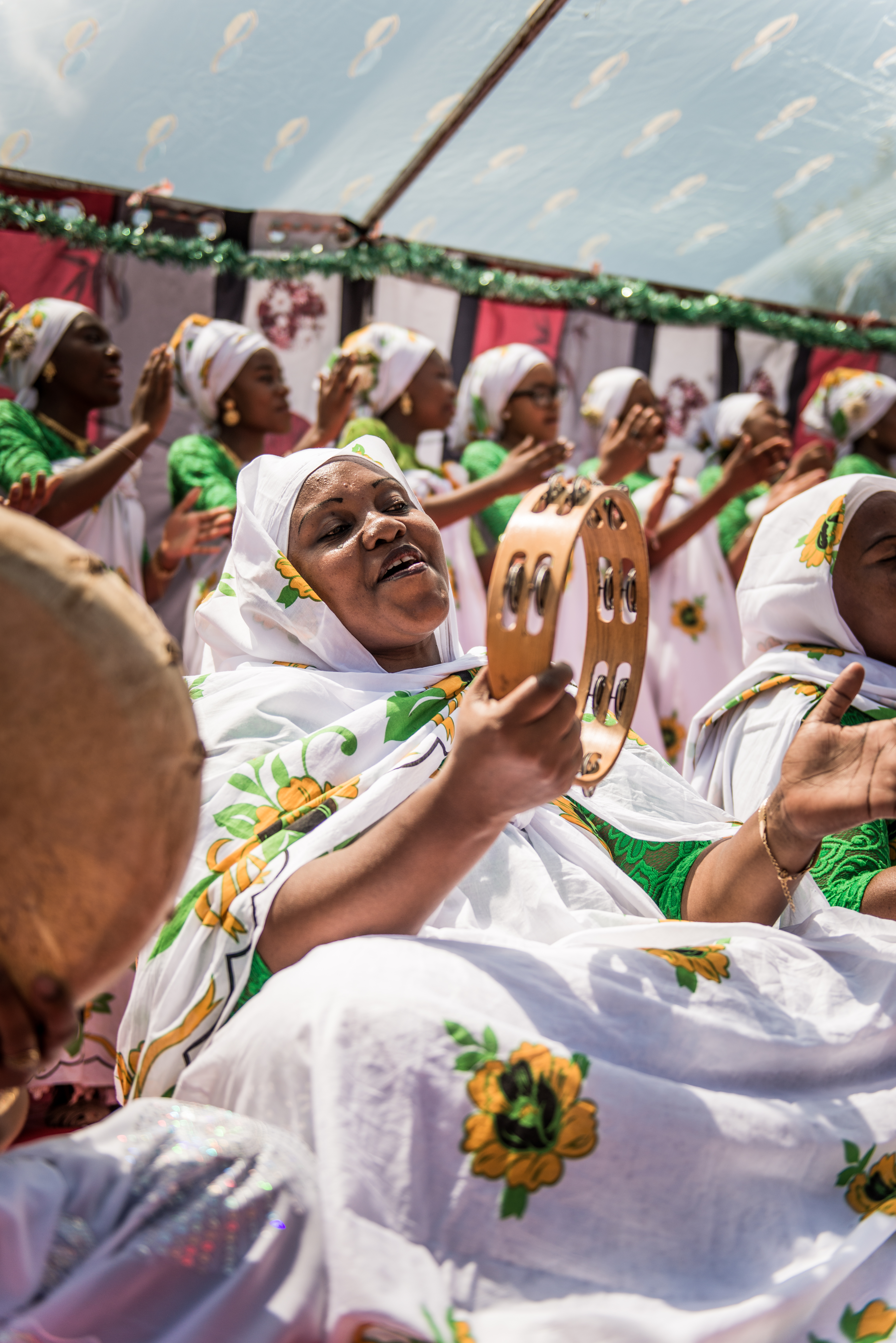
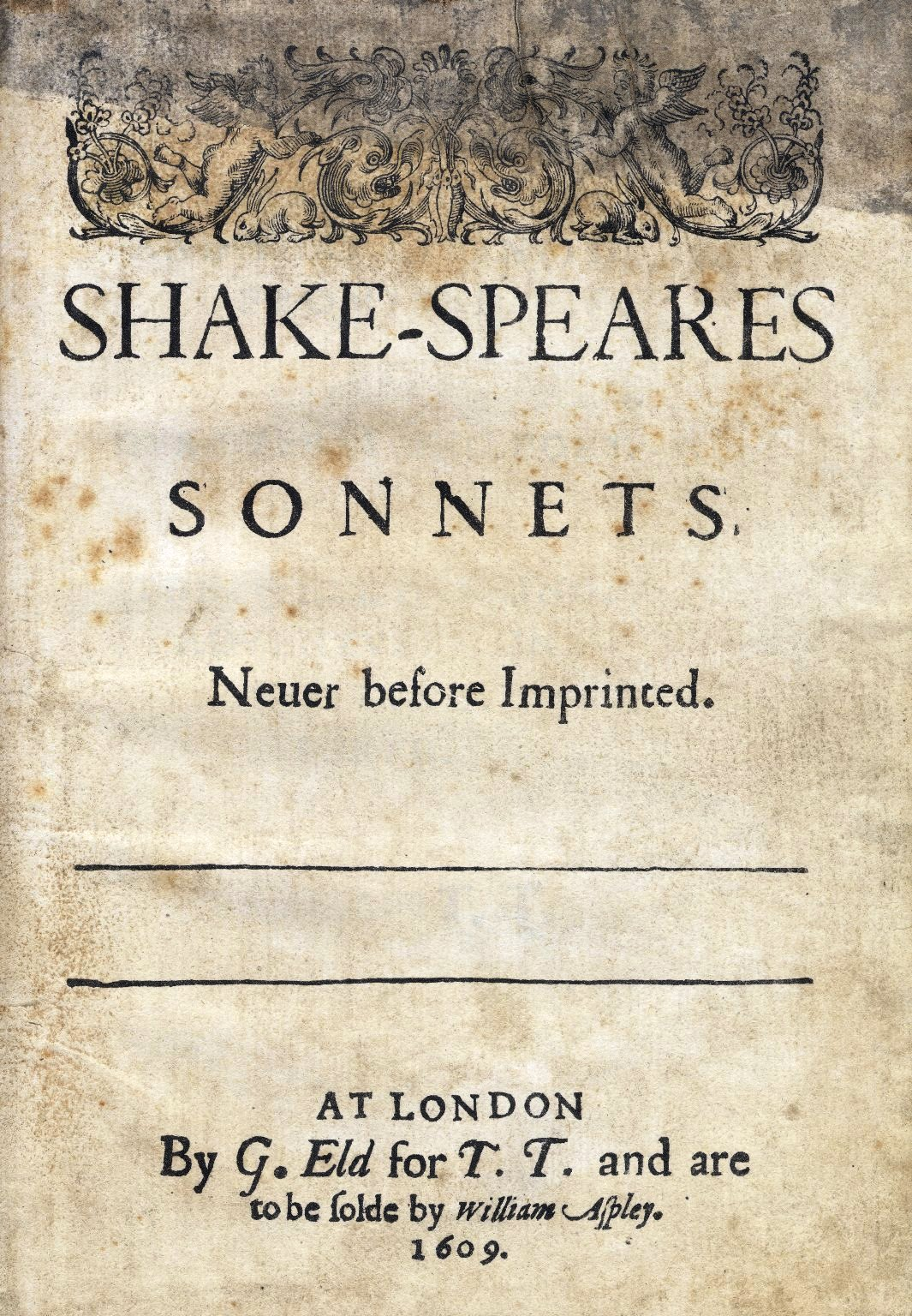
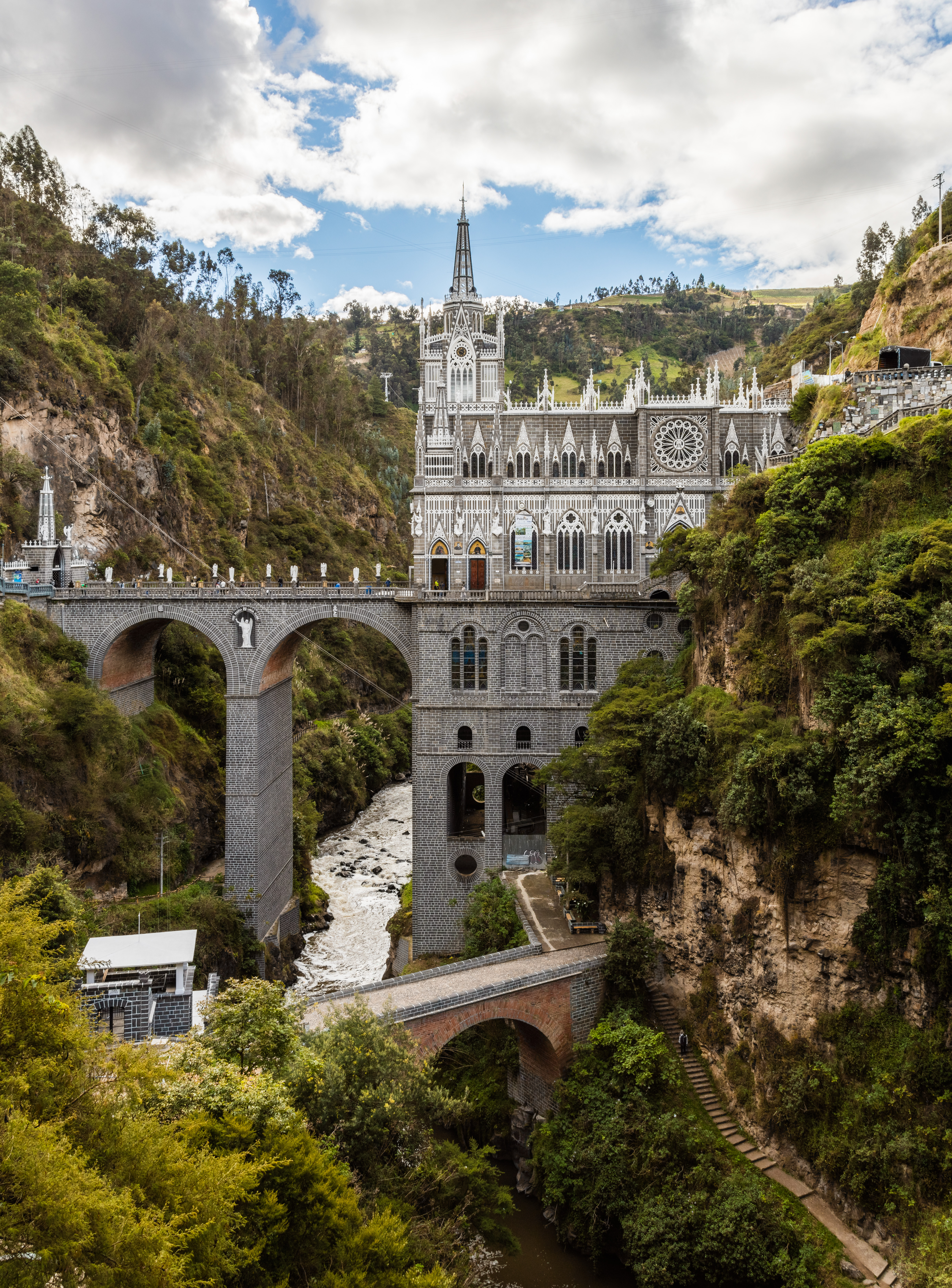
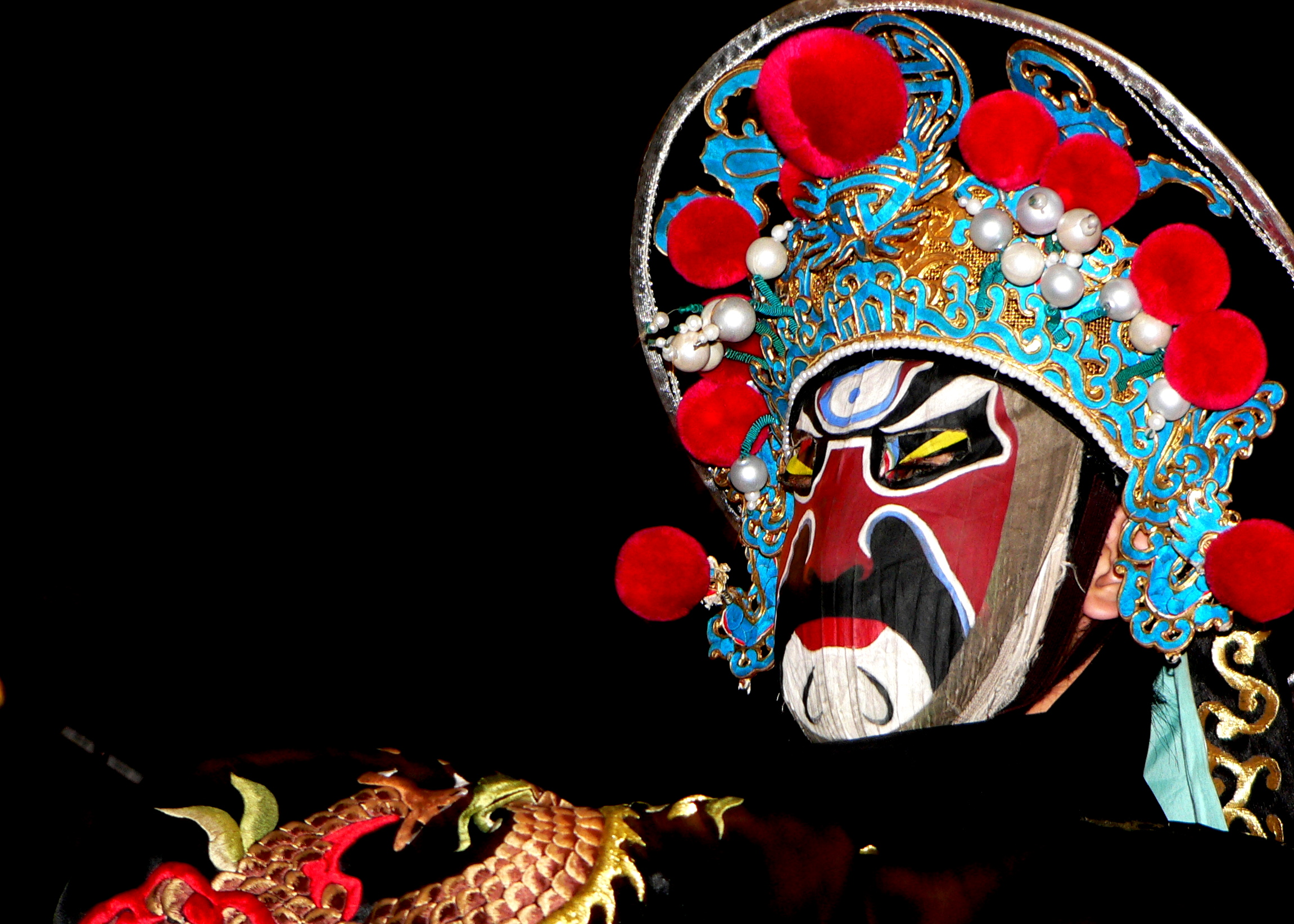
Clockwise, from top left:
- Still Life with Profile of Laval by Paul Gauguin, 1886
- A tambourine player at a traditional debaa dance festival in Mayotte
- Sanctuary of Las Lajas, Nariño Department, Colombia
- A bian lian performer
- The title page of Shakespeare's sonnets in a 1609 edition by Thomas Thorpe

The arts, or creative arts, are a vast range of human practices involving creative expression, storytelling, and cultural participation. The arts encompass diverse and plural modes of thought, deeds, and existence in an extensive range of media. Both a dynamic and characteristically constant feature of human life, the arts have developed into increasingly stylized and intricate forms. This is achieved through sustained and deliberate study, training, or theorizing within a particular tradition, across generations, and even between civilizations. The arts are a medium through which humans cultivate distinct social, cultural, and individual identities while transmitting values, impressions, judgements, ideas, visions, spiritual meanings, patterns of life, and experiences across time and space.

The arts are divided into three main branches: visual arts, literature, and performing arts. Examples of visual arts include architecture, ceramic art, drawing, filmmaking, painting, photography, and sculpture. Examples of literature include fiction, drama, poetry, and prose. Examples of performing arts include dance, music, and theatre. The arts can employ skill and imagination to produce physical objects and performances, convey insights and experiences, and construct new natural environments and spaces.

The arts can refer to common, popular, or everyday practices as well as more sophisticated, systematic, or institutionalized ones. They can be discrete and self-contained or combine and interweave with other art forms, such as combining artwork with the written word in comics. Art forms can also develop or contribute to aspects of more complex art forms, as in cinematography. By definition, the arts themselves are open to being continually redefined. The practice of modern art, for example, is a testament to the shifting boundaries, improvisation and experimentation, reflexive nature, and self-criticism or questioning that art and its conditions of production, reception, and possibility can undergo.

As both a means of developing capacities of attention and sensitivity and ends in themselves (art for art's sake), the arts can be a form of response to the world. It is a way to transform human responses and what humans deem worthwhile goals or pursuits. From prehistoric cave paintings during the Upper Palaeolithic, to ancient and contemporary forms of rituals, to modern-day films, the arts have registered, embodied, and preserved the ever-shifting relationships of humans with each other and the world.

== Definition ==
The arts are considered various practices or objects done by people with skill, creativity, and imagination across cultures and history. These activities include painting, sculpting, music, theatre, literature, and more. Art refers to the way of doing or applying human creative skills, typically, but not necessarily, in visual form.

However, there have been disputes on whether or not to classify something as a work of art, referred to as classificatory disputes about art. For example, classificatory disputes in the 20th century have included Cubist and Impressionist paintings, Marcel Duchamp's Fountain, the movies, J. S. G. Boggs' superlative imitations of banknotes, conceptual art, and video games.

== History and classifications ==
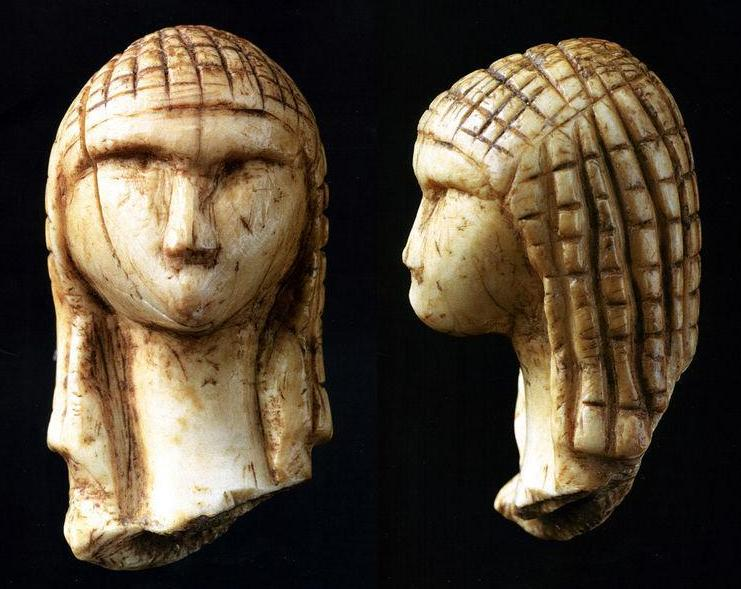
The Venus of Brassempouy, a fragmentary ivory figurine from the Upper Palaeolithic

In Ancient Greece, art and craft were referred to by the word techne. Ancient Greek art introduced veneration of the animal form and the development of equivalent skills to show musculature, poise, beauty, and anatomically correct proportions. Ancient Roman art depicted gods as idealized humans, shown with characteristically distinguishing features, such as Zeus' thunderbolt. In Byzantine and Gothic art of the Middle Ages, the dominant church insisted on the expression of Christian themes due to the overlap of church and state in medieval Europe. Asian art has generally worked in a style akin to Western medieval art, namely a concentration on surface patterning and local colour. (Note: The plain colour of an object, such as basic red for a red robe, rather than the modulations of that colour brought about by light, shade, and reflection.) A characteristic of this style is that local colour is defined by an outline, the cartoon being a contemporary equivalent. This is evident in the art of India, Tibet, and Japan. Islamic art avoids the representation of living beings, particularly humans and other animals, in religious contexts. It instead expresses religious ideas through calligraphy and geometrical designs.

=== Classifications ===
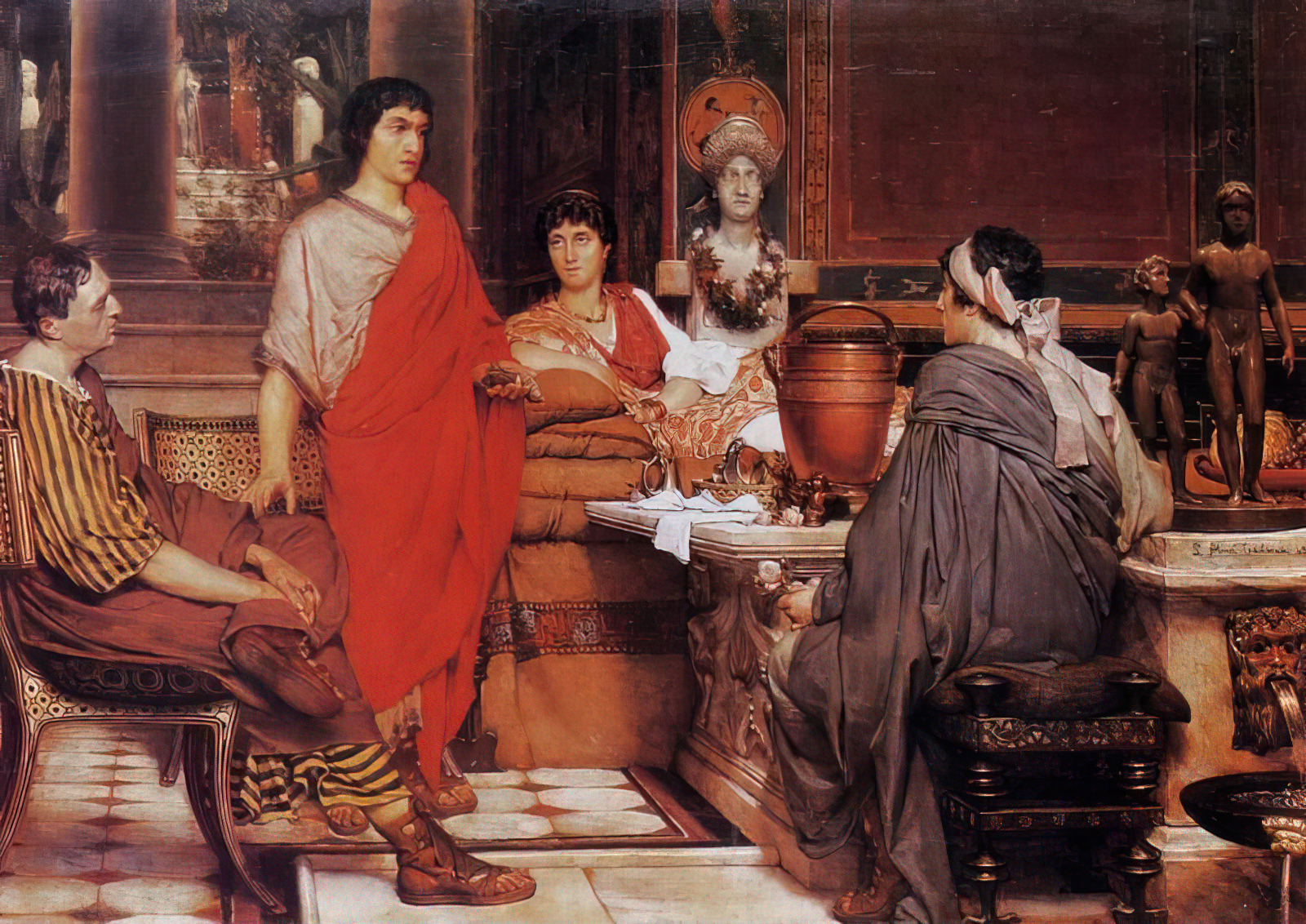
Lawrence Alma-Tadema's Catullus-at-Lesbia's, 1865

In the Middle Ages, liberal arts were taught in European medieval universities as part of the trivium, an introductory curriculum involving grammar, rhetoric, and logic, and of the quadrivium, a curriculum involving the "mathematical arts" of arithmetic, geometry, music, and astronomy. In modern academia, the arts can be grouped with, or a subset of, the humanities.

The arts have been classified into seven forms: painting, architecture, sculpture, literature, music, theatre, and filmmaking. Some arts may be derived from others; for example, drama is literature with acting, dance is music expressed through motion, and songs are music with literature and human voice. Television is sometimes called the "eighth" and comics the "ninth art" in Francophone scholarship, adding to the traditional "Seven Arts". Cultural fields like gastronomy are only sometimes considered as arts.

== Visual arts ==
Visual art forms include architecture, ceramic art, crafts, design, drawing, filmmaking, image, painting, photography, printmaking, sculpture, and video. Many artistic disciplines—such as performing arts, conceptual art, and textile arts—also involve aspects of the visual arts, as well as arts of other types. Within the visual arts, the applied arts, such as industrial design, graphic design, fashion design, interior design, and decorative arts are also included.

=== Architecture ===
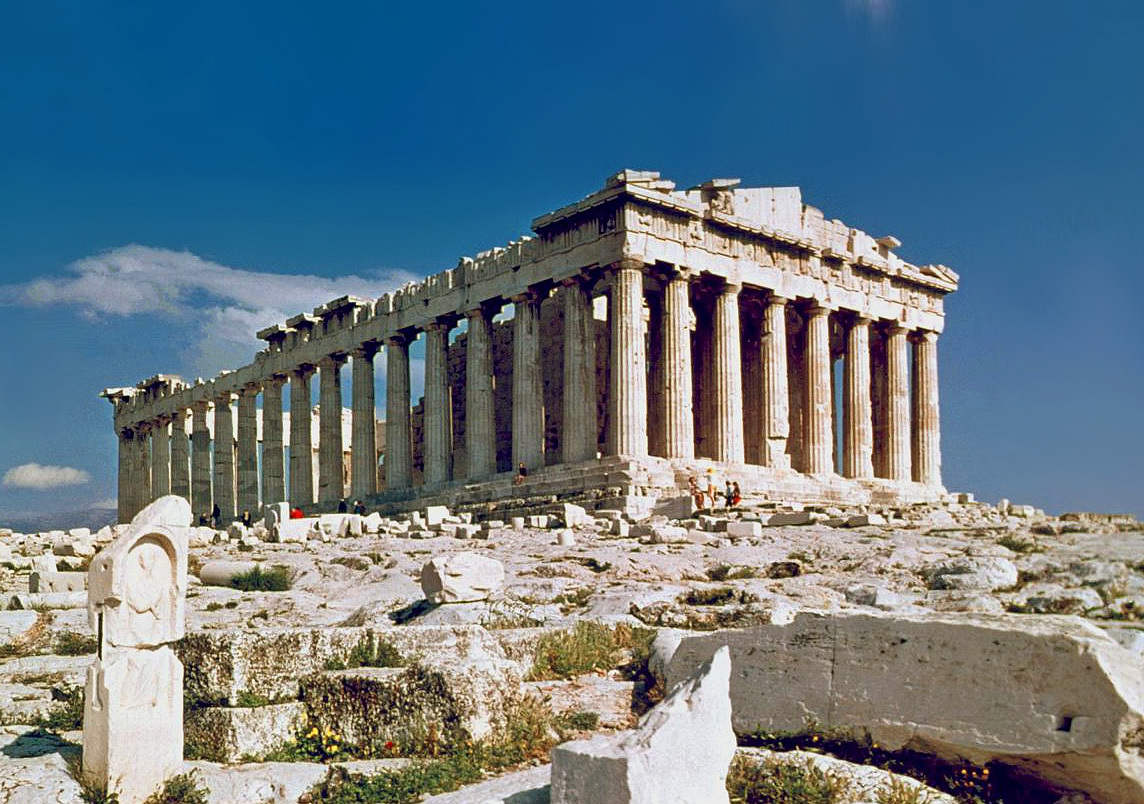
The Parthenon on top of the Acropolis, Athens, Greece

Architecture is the art and science of designing buildings and structures. Some definitions include the wider design of the built environment, from the macro level of urban planning, urban design, and landscape architecture, to the micro level of creating furniture. Architectural design usually must address feasibility and cost for the builder, as well as function and aesthetics for the user.

In modern usage, architecture is the art and discipline of creating or inferring an implied or apparent plan for a complex object or system. Some types of architecture manipulate space, volume, texture, light, shadow, or abstract elements to achieve pleasing aesthetics. Architectural works may be seen as cultural and political symbols or works of art. The role of architects, though changing, has been central to the design and implementation of pleasingly built environments in which people live.

=== Ceramic art ===
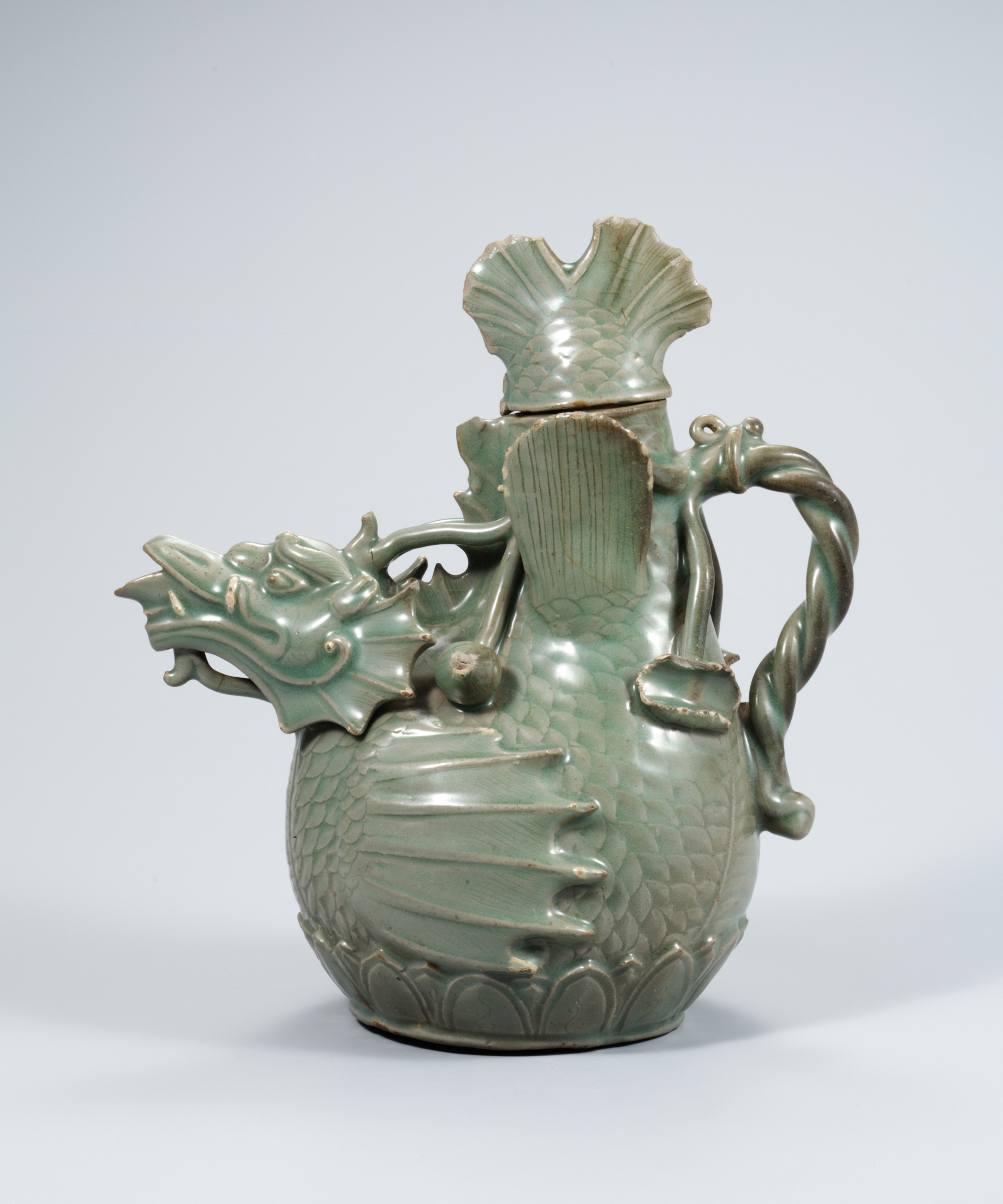
12th-century Goryeo celadon kettle. Goryeo wares are considered a great achievement of Korean art.

Ceramic art is art made from ceramic materials, which may take forms such as pottery, tiles, figurines, sculptures, and tableware. While some ceramic products are considered fine art, others are considered decorative, industrial, or applied art objects. Ceramics may also be considered artefacts in archaeology. People design, manufacture, and decorate pottery in pottery or ceramic factories. Some pottery is regarded as art pottery. In one-person pottery studios, ceramists or potters produce studio pottery. Ceramics exclude glass and mosaics made from glass tesserae.

=== Conceptual art ===
Conceptual art is art where the concepts or ideas involved in the work take precedence over traditional aesthetic and material concerns. The inception of the term in the 1960s referred to a strict and focused practice of idea-based art that defied traditional visual criteria associated with the visual arts in its presentation as text. Through its association with the Young British Artists and the Turner Prize during the 1990s, the popular usage of conceptual art, particularly in the United Kingdom, developed into a synonym for all contemporary art that does not practice the traditional skills of painting and sculpture.

=== Drawing ===
Drawing is a means of making an image using various tools and techniques. It generally involves making marks on a surface by applying pressure from a tool, or moving a tool across a surface. Common tools are graphite pencils, pen and ink, inked brushes, wax coloured pencils, crayons, charcoal, pastels, and marker pens. Digital tools with similar effects are also used. The main techniques used in drawing are line drawing, hatching, cross-hatching, random hatching, scribbling, stippling, and blending. An artist who excels in drawing is referred to as a drafter, draftswoman, or draughtsman. Drawing can be used to create art used in cultural industries such as illustrations, comics, and animation. Comics are often called the "ninth art" (le neuvième art) in Francophone scholarship, adding to the traditional "Seven Arts".

=== Painting ===
The Mona Lisa by Leonardo da Vinci

Painting is considered to be a form of self-expression. Drawing, gesture (as in action painting), composition, narration (as in narrative art), or abstraction (as in abstract art), among other aesthetic modes, may serve to manifest the expressive and conceptual intention of the practitioner. Paintings can be on a wide variety of topics, such as photographic, abstract, narrative, symbolistic (symbolism), emotive (Expressionism), or political in nature (artivism). Some modern painters, such as Jean Dubuffet or Anselm Kiefer, incorporate different materials, such as sand, cement, straw, wood, or strands of hair, for their artwork texture.

=== Photography ===
Photography as an art form refers to photographs that are created in accordance with the creative vision of the photographer. Art photography stands in contrast to photojournalism, which provides a visual account of news events, and commercial photography, the primary focus of which is to advertise products or services.

=== Sculpture ===
Sculpture is the branch of the visual arts that operates in three dimensions. It is one of the plastic arts. Durable sculptural processes originally used carving (the removal of material) and modelling (the addition of material, such as clay), in stone, metal, ceramic, wood, and other materials, but shifts in sculptural processes have led to almost complete freedom of materials and processes following modernism. A wide variety of materials may be worked by removal such as carving; assembled by welding or modelling; or moulded or cast.

=== Applied arts ===
The applied arts are the application of design and decoration to everyday, functional objects to make them aesthetically pleasing. The applied arts include fields such as industrial design, illustration, and commercial art. The term "applied art" is used in distinction to fine art, where the latter is defined as arts that aim to produce objects that are beautiful or provide intellectual stimulation but have no primary everyday function. In practice, the two often overlap.

== Literary arts ==
Sonnet 18
Sonnet 18 by William Shakespeare, part of the Fair Youth sequence of sonnets.

Literature (also known as literary arts or language arts) is generally identified as a collection of writings, which in Western culture are mainly prose (both fiction and non-fiction), drama, and poetry. In much, if not all, of the world, artistic linguistic expression can be oral as well and include such genres as epic, legend, myth, ballad, other forms of oral poetry, and folktales. Comics, the combination of drawings or other visual arts with narrative literature, are called the "ninth art" (le neuvième art) in Francophone scholarship.

== Performing arts ==
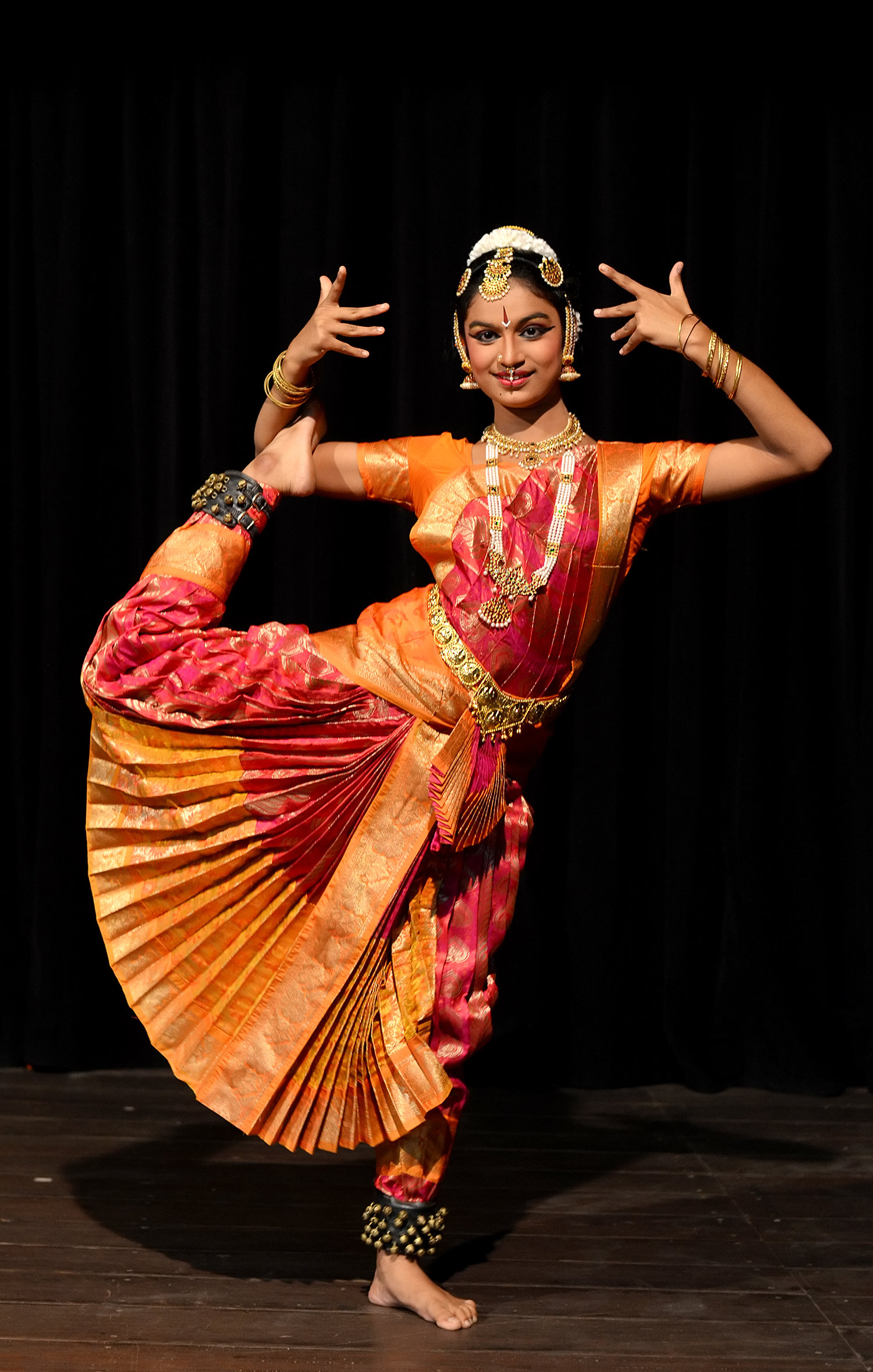
Bharatanatyam performer of Indian classical dance

Performing arts comprise dance, music, theatre, opera, mime, and other art forms in which human performance is the principal product. Performing arts are distinguished by this performance element in contrast with disciplines such as visual and literary arts, where the product is an object that does not require a performance to be observed and experienced. Each discipline in the performing arts is temporal in nature, meaning the product is performed over a period of time. Products are broadly categorized as being either repeatable (for example, by script or score) or improvised for each performance. Artists who participate in these arts in front of an audience are called performers, including actors, magicians, comedians, dancers, musicians, and singers. Performing arts are also supported by the services of other artists or essential workers, such as songwriters and those involved with stagecraft. Performers adapt their physical appearance with tools such as costumes and theatrical makeup.

=== Dance ===
Dance generally refers to human movement, either used as a form of expression or presented in a social, spiritual, or performance setting. (Note: The term "dance" is also used to describe the steps or pattern for particular choreography, a certain musical form or music genre, a dance party, or motion in inanimate objects (e.g. "the dance of the waters [...] was visible for over a mile around").) Choreography is the art of making dances, and the person who does this is called a choreographer. Definitions of what constitutes dance are dependent on social, cultural, aesthetic, artistic, and moral constraints, ranging from functional movement (such as folk dance) to codified virtuoso techniques such as ballet. Dance disciplines in sports include gymnastics, figure skating, and synchronized swimming. In martial arts, kata is compared to dance.

=== Music ===
Sheet music of the opening measures from Piano Sonata No. 11 by Wolfgang Amadeus Mozart

Music is defined as an art form whose medium is a combination of sounds. Though scholars agree that music generally consists of a few core elements, their exact definitions are debated. Commonly identified aspects include pitch (which governs melody and harmony), duration (including rhythm and tempo), intensity (including dynamics), and timbre. Though considered a cultural universal, the definition of music varies throughout the world as it is based on diverse views of nature, the supernatural, and humanity. Music is differentiated into composition and performance, while musical improvisation may be regarded as an intermediary tradition. Music can be divided into genres and subgenres, although the dividing lines and relationships between genres are subtle, open to individual interpretation, and controversial.

=== Theatre ===
Theatre is the branch of the performing arts concerned with acting out stories in front of an audience using combinations of speech, gesture, music, dance, sound, and spectacle. In addition to the standard narrative dialogue style, theatre takes such forms as opera (including Chinese opera), ballet, mime, kabuki, and Indian classical dance.

== Multidisciplinary artistic works ==
Areas exist in which artistic works incorporate multiple artistic fields, such as film, opera, and performance art. While opera is often categorized as the performing arts of music, the word itself is Italian for "works", because opera combines artistic disciplines into a singular artistic experience. In a traditional opera, the work uses the following: sets, costumes, acting, a libretto, singers, and an orchestra.

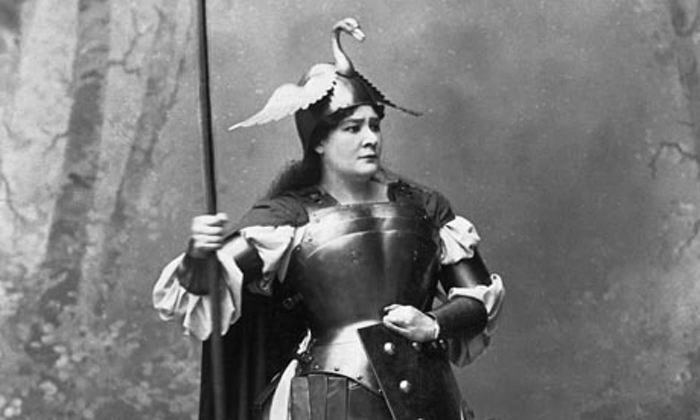
Ernestine Schumann-Heink as Waltraute in Götterdämmerung

The composer Richard Wagner recognized the fusion of many disciplines into a single work of opera, exemplified by his cycle Der Ring des Nibelungen ("The Ring of the Nibelung"). He did not use the term opera for his works, but instead Gesamtkunstwerk ("synthesis of the arts" or sometimes "music drama"), emphasizing the literary and theatrical components, which were as important as the music. Classical ballet is another form that emerged in the 17th century in which orchestral music is combined with dance.

Other works in the late 19th, 20th, and 21st centuries have fused other disciplines in creative ways, such as performance art. Performance art is a performance over time that combines any number of instruments, objects, and art within a predefined or less well-defined structure, some of which can be improvised. Performance art may be scripted, unscripted, random, or carefully organized—even audience participation may occur. John Cage is regarded by many as a performance artist rather than a composer, although he preferred the latter term. He did not compose for traditional ensembles. For example, Cage's composition Living Room Music, composed in 1940, is a quartet for unspecified instruments, really non-melodic objects, that can be found in the living room of a typical house, hence the title.

=== Video games ===
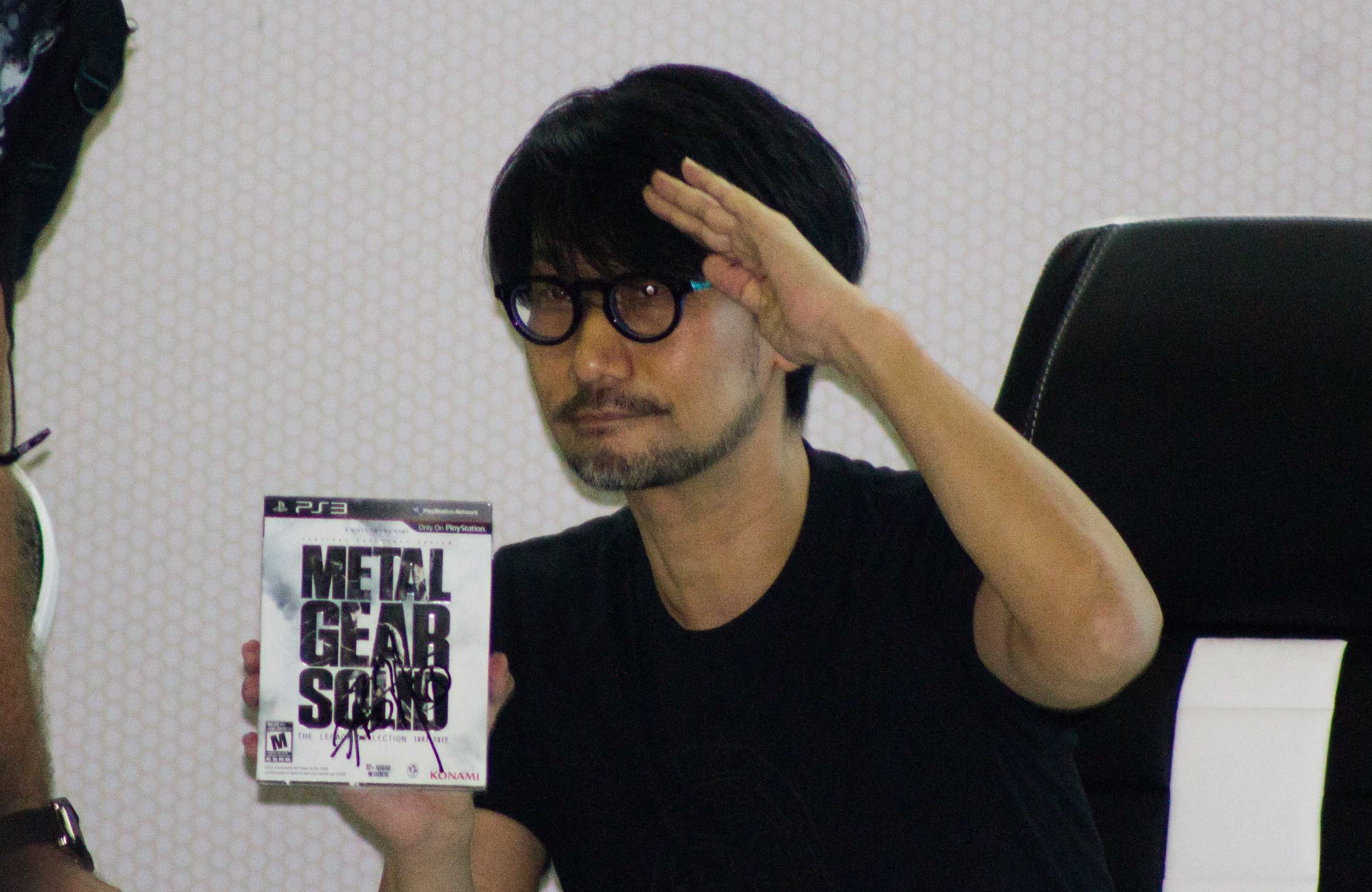
Hideo Kojima holding a video game case of one of his popular series, Metal Gear

Video games are multidisciplinary works that include uncontroversial artistic elements such as visuals and sound, as well as an emergent experience from the nature of their interactivity. Within video game culture, debates surround whether video games should be classified as an art form and whether video game developers—AAA or indie—should be classified as artists.

Hideo Kojima, a video game designer considered a gaming auteur, argued in 2006 that video games are a type of service rather than an art form. In the social sciences, cultural economists show how playing video games is conducive to involvement in more traditional art forms. In 2011, the National Endowment for the Arts included video games in its definition of a "work of art", and the Smithsonian American Art Museum presented an exhibit titled The Art of the Video Game in 2012.

== Criticism ==
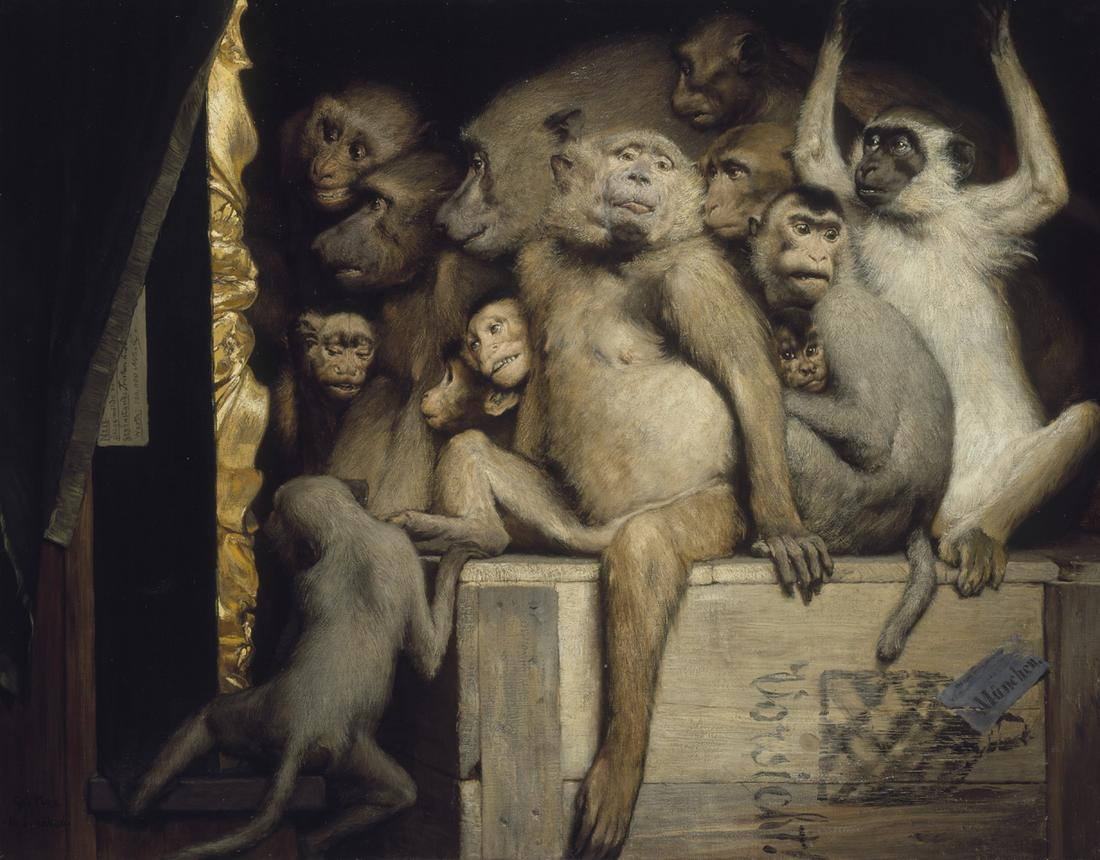
Monkeys as Judges of Art, Gabriel von Max, 1889

Art criticism is the discussion or evaluation of art. Art critics usually criticize art in the context of aesthetics or the theory of beauty. A goal of art criticism is the pursuit of a rational basis for art appreciation, but it is questionable whether such criticism can transcend prevailing sociopolitical circumstances.

The variety of art movements has resulted in a division of art criticism into different disciplines, which may each use different criteria for their judgements. The most common division in the field of criticism is between historical criticism and evaluation, a form of art history, and contemporary criticism of work by living artists.

Despite perceptions that criticism is a lower-risk activity than making art, opinions of current art are liable to corrections with the passage of time. Critics of the past can be ridiculed for dismissing artists now venerated (like the early work of the Impressionists). Some art movements themselves were named disparagingly by critics, with the name later adopted as a badge of honour by the artists of the style with the original negative meaning forgotten, e.g. Impressionism and Cubism. Artists have had an uneasy relationship with their critics. Artists usually need positive opinions from critics for their work to be viewed and purchased.

Many variables determine judgement of art, such as aesthetics, cognition, or perception. Aesthetic, pragmatic, expressive, formalist, relativist, processional, imitation, ritual, cognition, mimetic, and postmodern theories are some of the many theories to criticize and appreciate art. Art criticism and appreciation can be subjective based on personal preference toward aesthetics and form, or on the elements and principles of design and by social and cultural acceptance.

== Education ==
Arts in education is a field of educational research and practice informed by investigations into learning through arts experiences. In this context, the arts can include performing arts education (dance, drama, and music), literature and poetry, storytelling, visual arts education in film, craft, design, digital art, media, and photography.

== Political and moral issues ==
A strong relationship between the arts and politics, particularly between various kinds of art and power, occurs across history and archaeological cultures. As the arts respond to news and politics, they take on political as well as social dimensions, becoming a focus of controversy and a force of political and social change.

Some artists have been observed to have free spirits. For instance, Alexander Pushkin, a well-regarded writer, attracted the irritation of Russian officialdom, particularly Emperor Alexander I, as someone who:

instead of being a good servant of the state in the rank and file of the administration and extolling conventional virtues in his vocational writings (if write he must), composed extremely arrogant, independent, and wicked verse in which dangerous freedom of thought was evident in the novelty of his versification, in the audacity of his sensual fancy, and in his propensity for making fun of major and minor tyrants.

In more recent times, Banksy, an England-based graffiti artist who constantly conflicted with the authorities, has also been considered a "free spirit" due to his work.

Artists use their work to express their political views and promote social change, from negatively influencing through hate speech to positively influencing through artivism. Governments use art, or propaganda, to promote their own agendas.

Moral issues impact the arts, and the arts impact discussion of moral issues. One approach to this issue is that taken by the Catholic Church, which declared in 1963 that the arts are "not exempt" from "the absolute primacy of the objective moral order".
