= Music of Mayotte =

Mahoraise music is the music of the island of Mayotte, a French island located in the Mozambique Channel of the Indian Ocean. The principal musical genres which encompass Mahoraise are Mgodro, Blues, Traditional music, Gaboussi, and Chakacha

== Mahorais groups and singers ==
=== Groups ===
- Alpha Djo
- Les Rapaces

=== Singers ===
- M'toro Chamou
- Mikidache
- Baco
- Rekman Seller
- Saandati Moussa
- Zily
- Jean-Raymond Cudza
- Boura Mahiya
- Zama Colo
- Del Zid
- Mado
- Baco Ali
- Lima Wild
- Komo
- Bob Mursala
- Bo Houss
- Terrel Elymoor
- Langa
- Vélou Moirabou
- Babadi
- Edmond Bébé
- Anfane Lewis
- Lady Lova

== Music Body Report ==
- Colo Mangara
- Mariame Kanlangaga
- Riziki Mtsounga
- Jeff Ridjali
- Henry Said Henry

== Spiritual Worlds ==
- Maoulida
- Dahira
- Shigoma
- Madjilisse
- Manzaraka
