= Tsingoni Mosque =

Mosque in Tsingoni, Mayotte

- Mosquée de Tsingoni
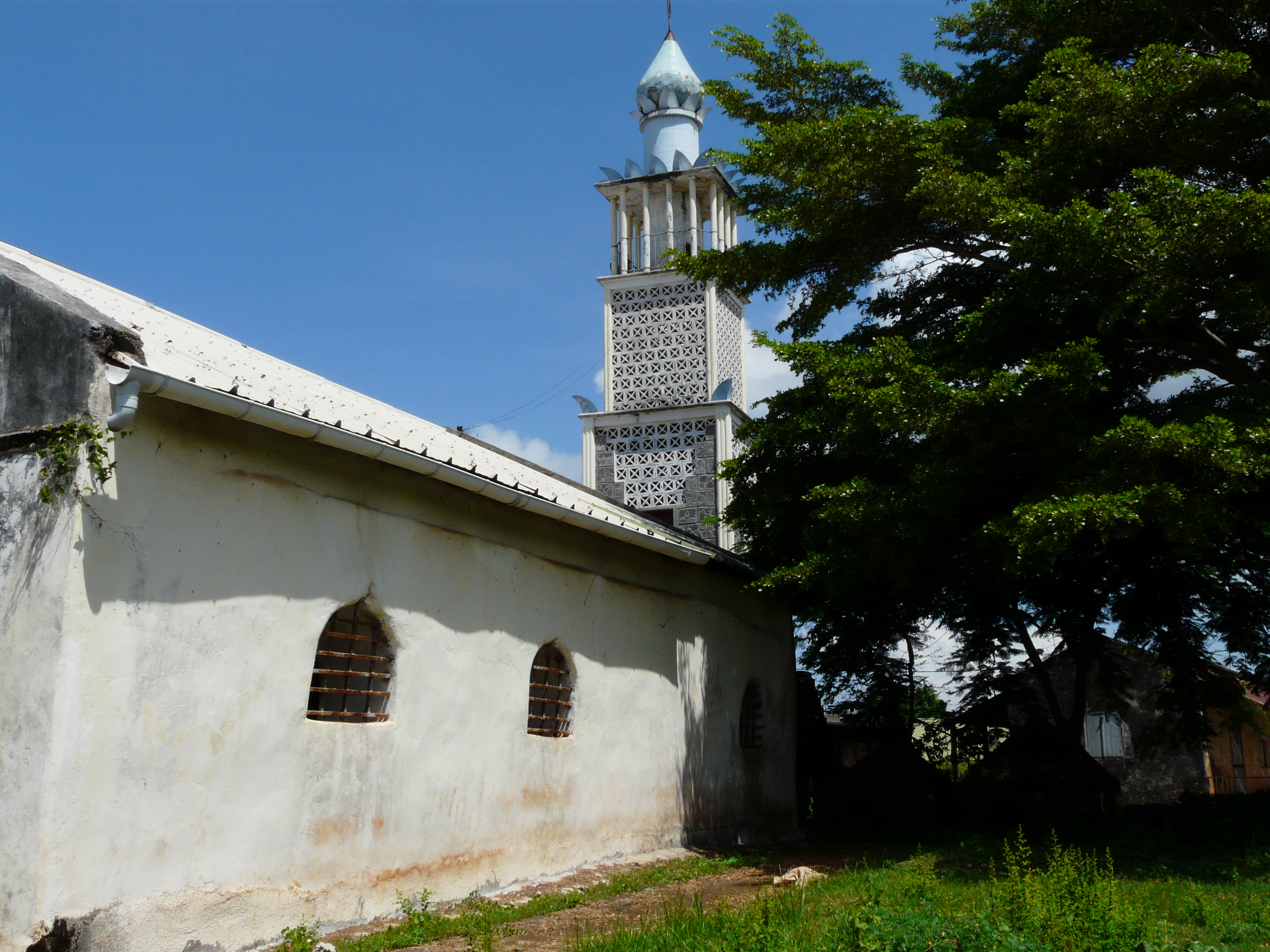

- Location of the mosque in Mayotte

Religion
- Affiliation: Islam
- Ecclesiastical or organizational status: Mosque
- Status: Active

Location
- Location: Tsingoni, Mayotte
- Country: France
- Interactive map of Tsingoni Mosque
- Coordinates: 12°47′23.2″S 45°06′23.2″E

Architecture
- Type: Mosque
- Established: 1538

Monument historique
- Designated: 2016

The Tsingoni Mosque (French: Mosquée de Tsingoni) is a mosque in Tsingoni, Mayotte, an overseas department and region of France. It is considered the earliest established mosque in France.

== History ==
The exact date of the establishment of the mosque is disputed. One source places the construction of the mosque at 1538. Researchers alternatively date the establishment of the mosque at around 1441. In 1994, a new minaret was erected; and in 2016, the mosque was listed as a French historical monument. Beginning in 2019, renovations commenced at an estimated cost of €2 million.

== See also ==
- Islam in Mayotte
- List of mosques in France
