= Salouva =

Traditional dress of the Mahorese woman

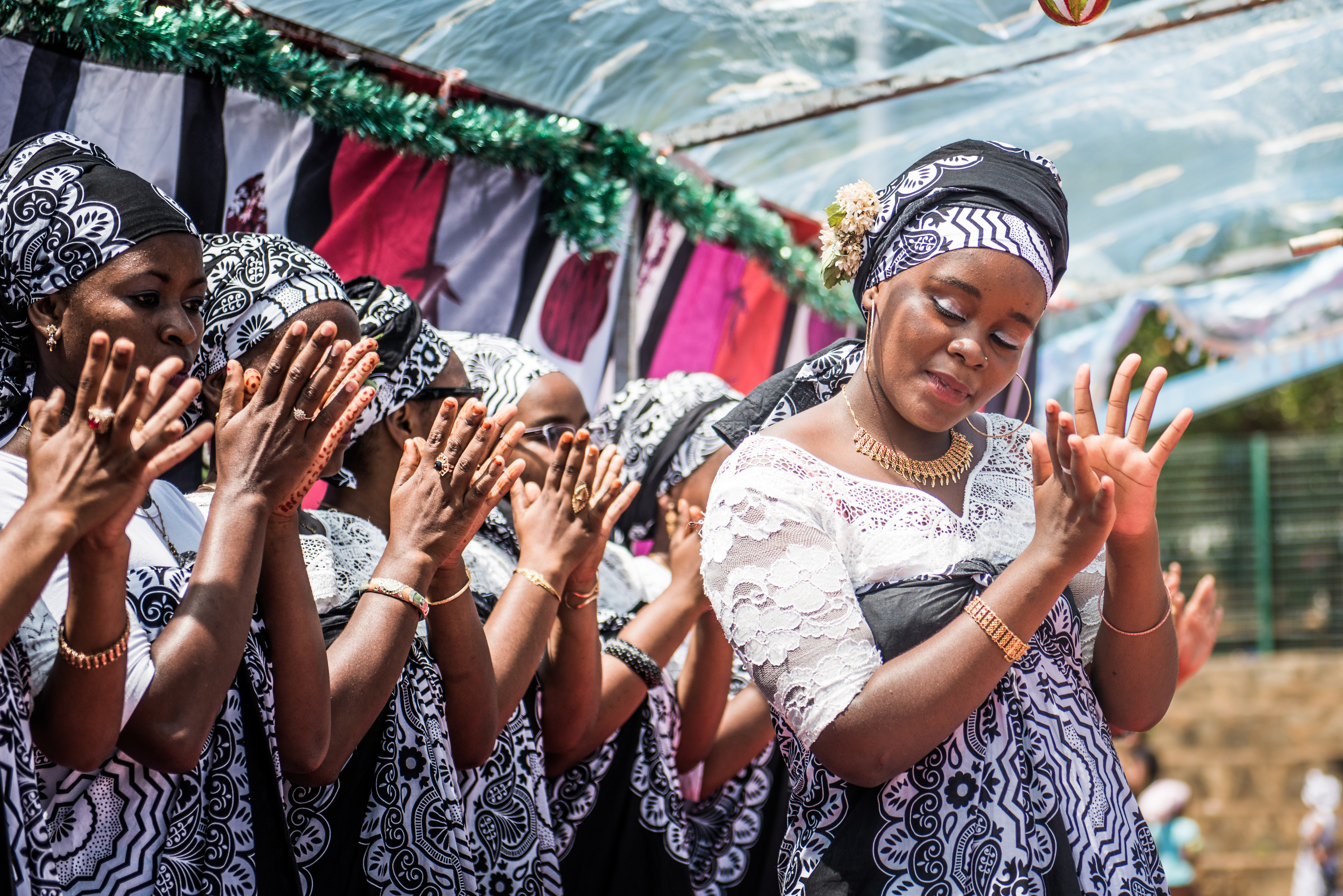
Debaa dancers in identical salouva outfits.

The salouva is a traditional dress of Mahorese women.

== See also ==
- Culture of Mayotte
