= Islam in Mayotte =

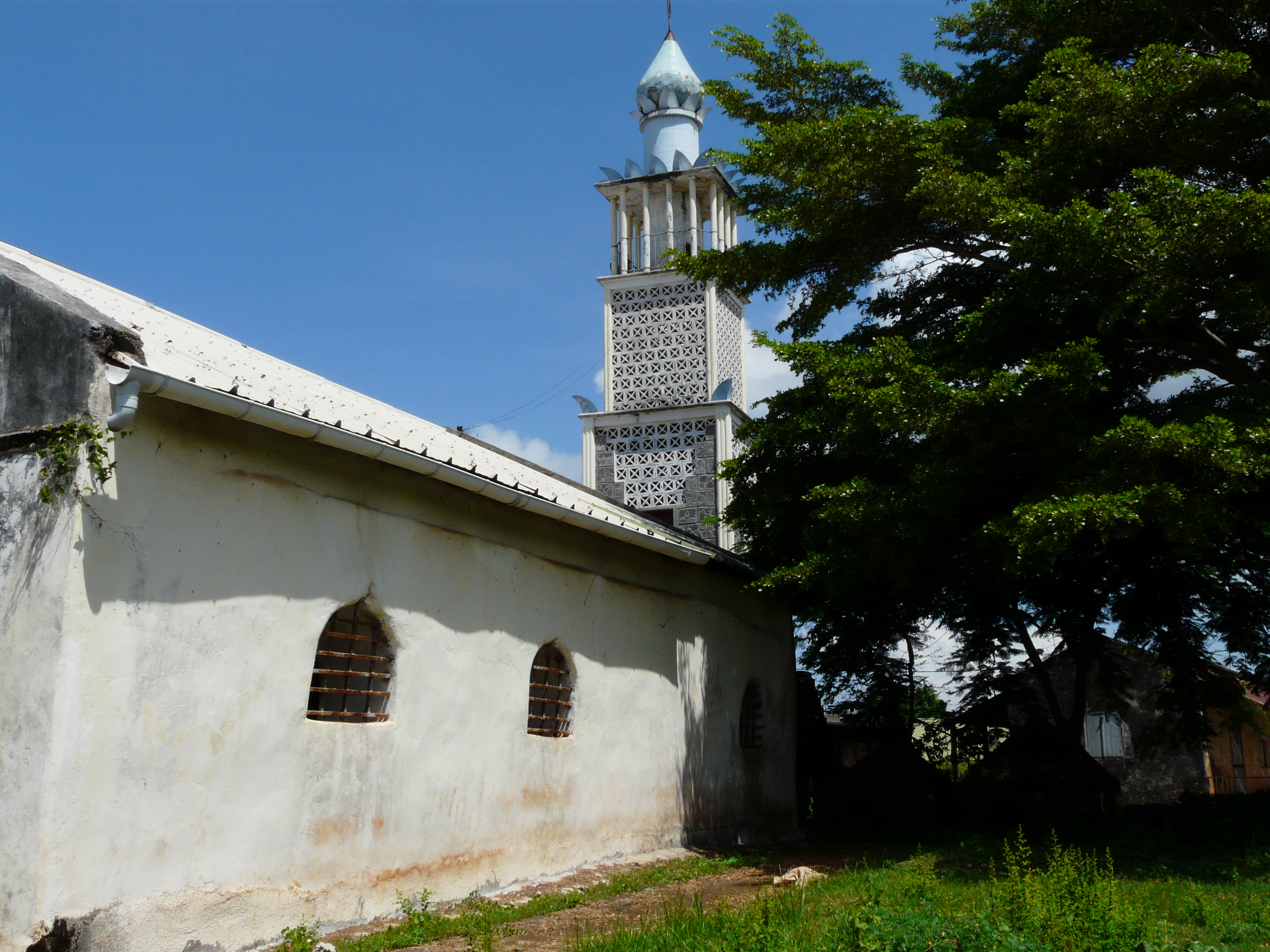
Tsingoni Mosque

Islam is the faith of the majority of the residents of the island of Mayotte with 98% as Muslims and 2% Christians according to a 2012 estimate. 85,000 of the total 90,000 inhabitants of the island are Mahorais. The Mahorais are a blend of settlers from many areas: mainland Africans, Arabs and Malagasy. The presence of Islam in Mayotte can traced back to at least the 15th century.

The Muslims of Mayotte are Sunni Muslims. Despite the strong presence of Islam, Mahorese culture is imbued with animism and mystical rituals are still widely practiced, especially among the community of Malagasy origin.

== Mosques ==
- Tsingoni Mosque

== See also ==
- Islam in France
- Culture of Mayotte
