= Biyaya =

The Bayaya is a mixed and circular dance from the island of Mayotte. The performers form a circle and follow each other, taking steps forward and backward; the dance is punctuated by the ngôma ensemble (several double-skin drums). Previously the macheve cowbells that the dancers wore on their feet participated as musical instruments.

== Circumstances ==
Previously, this dance was practiced during the Msada, a mutual aid, for example during the harvest or the construction of a house. From now on, it is practiced during festivals or various demonstrations, in particular political. It is then practiced a little differently since the dancers alternate the circular formation with a row formation when they are on stage in front of the audience. This dance has become rare
