= Lady Lova =

French singer

- Origin: Mayotte
- Genres: Dancehall; Hip hop
- Occupation: Singer
- Instrument: Vocals
- Years active: 2007–present
- Website: Lady Lova

Lady Lova, known as Le Diamant noir (the Black Diamond), is a French singer of dancehall and hip hop.

== Career ==
Born in Bandraboua in Mayotte, Lady Lova was raised in Réunion.

She began her career in the French Indian Ocean territories, where she first came to public attention in 2009 with a traditional song, "Nitso wendza" ("I would love you" in maore dialect), which had 200,000 views on YouTube. Her later song "Pom Pom Dance" (2012) featuring Houssdjo was picked up by the Belgian recording company GLG Records and included in dozens of dance compilations in Belgium, France, and Italy.

After a period when she appeared frequently in top clubs in mainland France and Belgium, she moved to Chambéry. She collaborated with Colonel Reyel on the single "Prépare", which ranked 22nd on the Hits Clubs DJ list of top 40 tracks. Her first live performance was at the Festival de sensibilisation 3 S in Bandraboua in 2013.

Lady Lova scored a big hit with "Voulez vous danser" (2010). Her subsequent tracks "Diamant noir" (2017) and "Mal élevé" (2018, with T-Matt) had more than a million views on YouTube. 2018's "Come back" had more than two million views. In early 2019 she released "Alewe", with Chris Grant,.

In 2018 rapper Alrima featured her in a duet titled "Mamoudou Gassama" for the Malian immigrant who rescued a child in Paris. The video had more than 4.5 million views. She also featured with Admiral T on "Millésime", on his 2019 album Caribbean Monster.

In February 2020, she released the song "Wine", through Sony Music France.

In September 2020 she launched a clothing line called Bad Girl.
