= Voice of the Indian Ocean =

Musical award

- Type: Musical Competition
- Awarded for: Music award artists from Reunion Island and the Indian Ocean as a reward for their work, talent, development and popularity
- Venue: Réunion
- Reward: Voice of the Indian Ocean
- Status: Active
- Website: www.lesvoi.com

Les Voix de l´Ocean Indien (commonly abbreviated as a Voice) is a television musical award show and competition. The program focuses on the musical scene of several countries located in the Indian Ocean: Seychelles, Comoros, Madagascar, Mauritius, as well as the two French overseas departments of Mayotte and Réunion. The competition is organized by the Voix de l'océan Indien Association and Organizo productions. It takes place in Saint-Denis, Réunion.

Artists are nominated by the public for a given calendar year. A selection committee then narrows down that pool of candidates to a manageable number for an election, conducted by the final board. This process is fairly transparent.

== 2017 edition ==
- Best Maloya Artist: Héritaz Maloya (Réunion)
- Best Séga Artist: Fami Mélody (Réunion)
- Best Urban Music Artist: Kosla (Réunion)
- Best International/Pop Artist: Kenaelle (Réunion)
- Best Electro Artist: Do-moon (Réunion)
- Song of the Year: Kenaelle (Réunion)
- Best Male Voice: Hans Nayna (Mauritius)
- Best Female Voice: Jane Constance (Mauritius)
- Best Audiovisual Production: Sega'el Ft. Dimix Staya (Réunion)
- Best Mauritian Artist: Alain Ramanisum (Mauritius)
- Best Malagasy Artist: Stéphanie (Madagascar)
- Best Mahoran Artist: Rekman Seller (Mayotte)
- Best Comorian Artist: Dadi poslim (Comoros)
- Tribute Award: Jean Pierre Laselve (Réunion)
- Hope Award: Kaloune (Réunion)
