= Debaa =

The debaa or deba is a mixture of traditional dance, music and song practiced on the island of Mayotte, where it is reserved exclusively for women.

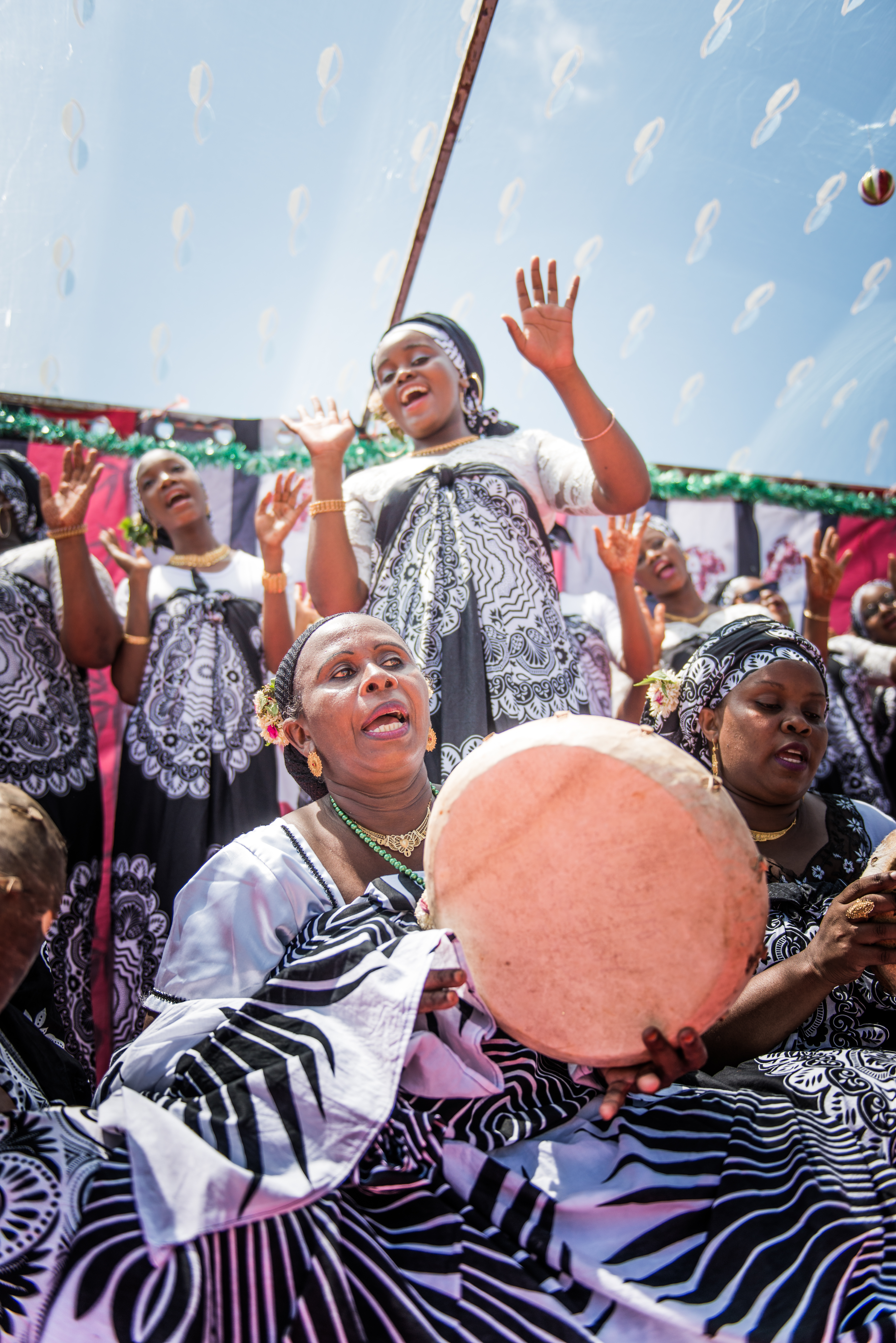
Danseuses et musiciennes réunies.

Debaa can have religious significance, be practiced as a distraction, or be akin to a competition between several groups of women from different villages.

== Origin ==
The debaa is a recent tradition drawn from Sufism, a form of spirituality developed in Basra through contact with Shiism by the successors of Abdou-l-Wâhid ibnou Zayd, a disciple of Al-Hassan al-Basrî, himself being a tali'i of Persian origin, that is to say an individual who has known at least one sahâbi, a companion of the prophet of Islam, the religion which is the majority religion in Islam in Mayotte. It should nevertheless be noted that the specificities of Sufism are not based on the sacred texts (the Koran and the corpus of the Hadith) unanimously recognized as authentic, and that if the asceticism of Al-Hassan al-Basrî inspired Sufism, nothing has been reported to confirm that he was the instigator.

The debaa developed in Mayotte in the years 1920-1930 under the influence of a foundi (Madrasa school teacher). Linked to the Sufi brotherhood Rifa'iyya, it was first reserved for men and of a purely religious nature, before opening up to women, then being reserved for them.

The debaa is identical to the practices of Sufism with regard to chanting and music, which consists of a few simple percussions, the only notable difference being the dance.
