= Mbiwi =

Traditional instrument accompanied by song and dance

Mbiwi are bamboo claves that Mayotte women clash to a particular rhythm, and accompany with singing and dance, traditionally practiced on the island of Mayotte, where it is reserved exclusively for women.

The mbiwi begins when a mother from mahoraise begins to sing and another dances while tapping on the mbiwi. The women are grouped into associations which invite each other. It is the older mothers who sing because they learned the lyrics when they were younger.
