= Adrien Quatennens =

French politician (born 1990)

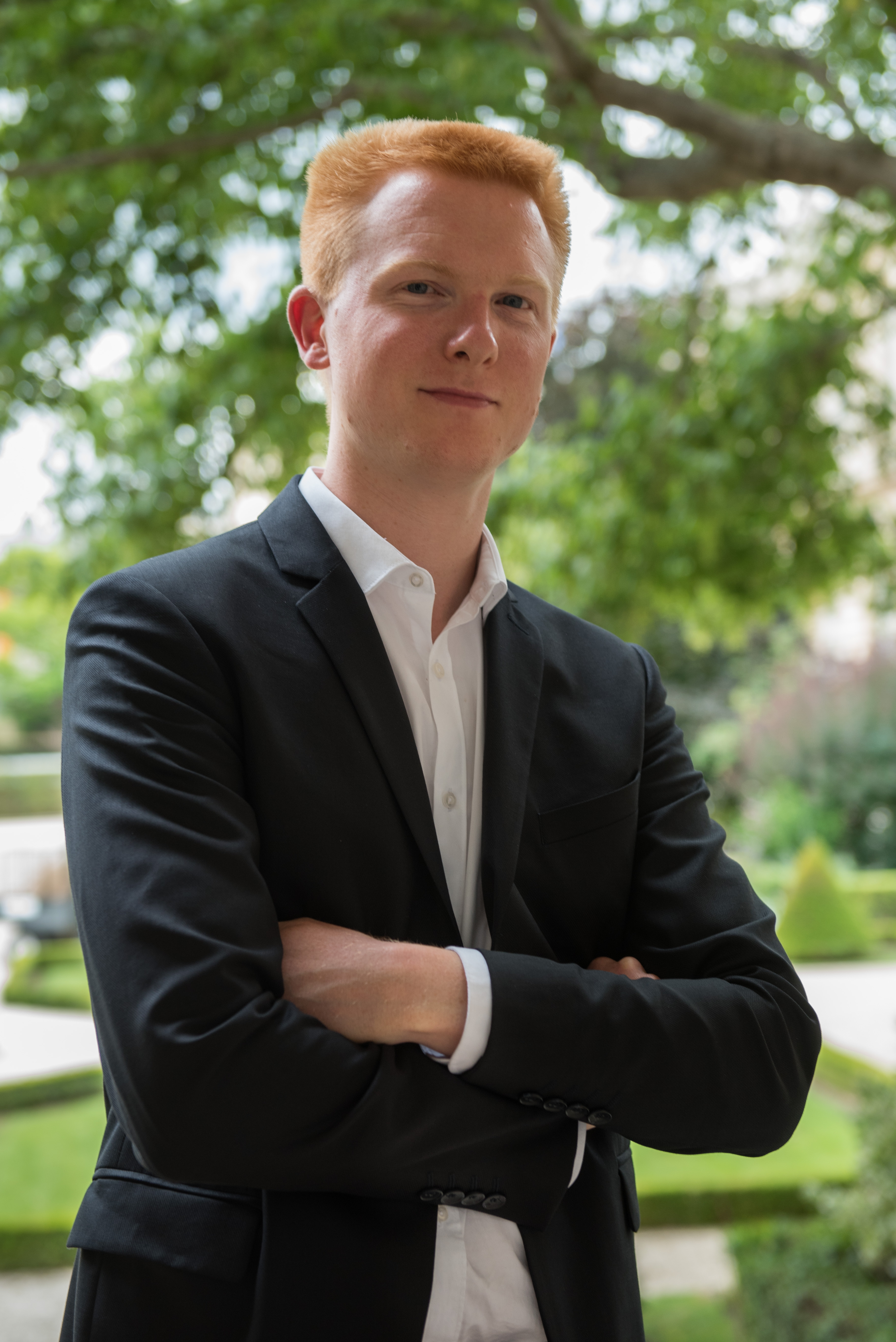
- Quatennens in 2017

Member of the National Assembly for Nord's 1st constituency
- In office 21 June 2017 – 9 June 2024
- Preceded by: Bernard Roman
- Succeeded by: Aurélien Le Coq

Coordinator of La France Insoumise
- In office 22 June 2019 – 18 September 2022
- Preceded by: Manuel Bompard
- Succeeded by: Manuel Bompard

Personal details
- Born: 23 May 1990 (age 36) Lille, France
- Party: Left Party (since 2013); La France Insoumise (since 2016)
- Profession: Customer advisor
- Website: https://adrienquatennens.fr/

Adrien Quatennens (French pronunciation: [adʁijɛ̃ kat(ə)nɛ̃s]; born 23 May 1990) is a French politician who has represented Nord's 1st constituency in the National Assembly between 2017 and 2024. From June 2019 until September 2022, he was also the party coordinator of La France Insoumise (LFI). He lost that position after acknowledging having engaged in domestic violence against his former wife. Quatennens was first elected to the National Assembly in the 2017 legislative election before he was reelected in 2022. He was sentenced to four months imprisonment on parole for domestic violence in late 2022 upon being convicted of domestic violence against his wife.

== Early life and education ==
Adrien Quatennens was born on 23 May 1990 in Lille, Nord. His father is an executive of Électricité de France (EDF), France's public electric utility company, and his mother is a salesperson in an eyeglasses store.

Quatennens became involved in politics at the age of 16, participating in the 2006 youth protests in France against the First Employment Contract. He is also a member of organizations supporting homeless people as well as ATTAC, a group advocating the taxation of foreign exchange transactions. In 2008, Quatennens received a baccalauréat in economic and social affairs from the Catholic school La Croix Blanche in Bondues. He then began studying economics at the University of Lille, but dropped out in his second year and entered the workforce. While working at EDF as an apprentice, Quatennens obtained a Brevet de technicien supérieur (BTS) in business management, after which he began to work as a consultant for businesses and professionals in the energy sector. His last job before being elected to the National Assembly was the position of customer consultant to EDF in Lille.

== Political career ==
=== Left Party ===
Adrien Quatennens became a follower of Jean-Luc Mélenchon in 2008, joining him in the Left Party (PG) in 2013 and becoming a member of its national council two years later. During the 2012 French presidential election, Quatennens campaigned for Mélenchon's unsuccessful presidential bid and did so again under the banner of La France Insoumise (LFI) in 2017. He also served alongside Ugo Bernalicis as PG secretary in Nord, being based in Lille.

In the 2014 French municipal elections, Quatennens ran unsuccessfully for a seat on the municipal council of Lille as a part of Hugo Vandamme's PG electoral list.

=== La France Insoumise and National Assembly ===
Quatennens was nominated by LFI in Nord's 1st constituency during the 2017 French legislative elections, winning 19.38% of the vote in the first round against 32.61% for Christophe Itier of La République En Marche (LREM). The insoumis was then elected to the National Assembly in the second round with 50.11% of the vote, or a margin of 50 votes.

As a deputy, Quatennens sits on the Social Affairs Committee. His committee work has included a review of the 2017 labour law reform bill, against which he introduced a motion for preliminary rejection. Quatennens' early days in the National Assembly attracted much media attention, especially after he gave a speech lasting half an hour on 10 July 2017. He also advocated for an LFI bill to recognize mental health issues linked to occupational burnout as occupational diseases.

Quatennens is considered a rising figure in LFI, being named party coordinator by the LFI representative assembly to replace Manuel Bompard on 22 July 2019.

Quatennens was chosen by his party to lead its campaign against the Philippe government's pension reform bill. He denounced the proposal as an "inequitable" project due to differences in life expectancy between social classes as well as its ultimate goal of effectively raising the retirement age.

Quatennens was one of the French political figures targeted by Pegasus spyware under the orders of the government of Morocco, leading him to file a legal complaint in court.

The 2022 presidential election saw Mélenchon come in first place in Quatennens' constituency, winning 41.8% of the vote in the first round. Quatennens successfully ran for re-election in the subsequent 2022 French legislative elections under the LFI banner. He was one of 15 National Assembly candidates nationwide to win with over 50% of the vote in the first round, recording one of the best electoral results in his party. On 18 September 2022, Quatennens stepped down from his duties as coordinator of La France Insoumise, following a domestic violence controversy with his wife, Céline Quatennens.

He was initially a candidate of the New Popular Front ahead of the 2024 legislative election, though he withdrew his candidacy on 16 June.

== Personal life ==
Adrien Quatennens is a fan of rock music and has admired Johnny Hallyday since he was a child. In his teenage years, Quatennens also became a fan of Nirvana, Noir Désir, Bob Marley—of whom he wrote a biography at the age of 12—and Hubert-Félix Thiéfaine, whose concerts he has attended many times. Quatennens also plays the drums for the Insousols, a band consisting of members of La France Insoumise.

In 2022, Quatennens admitted to slapping his wife and subsequently resigned as Coordinator of the Left-Green alliance.

== Works ==
- Preface to Battre la campagne: journal d'une insoumise by Céleste van Isterdael, Éditions Borrego, 2018
- Génération Mélenchon, Seuil, 2021
