= Sarah Soilihi =

French political activist

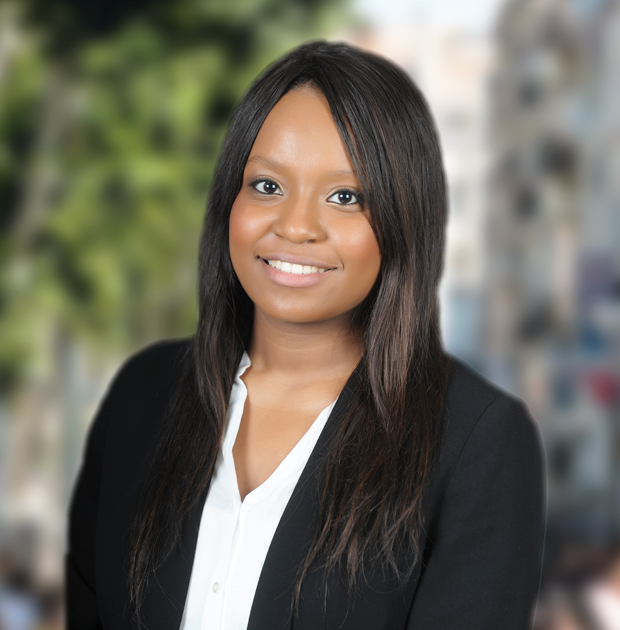
- Born: 1992 (age 33–34); Marseille
- Occupations: Kickboxer; Martial artist; Political activist; Politician
- Years active: 2012–

Sarah Soilihi (born 1992) is a French athlete, politician, and political spokesperson. A victory at the World Traditional Kickboxing Association in 2015 made her a competitive kick-boxing champion, and the following year she was a French national champion in semi-contact karate. Beginning in 2012 she was an active member of the French Socialist Party, and she ran on socialist party lists in elections in 2014 and 2015 but did not obtain a seat. During the 2017 French presidential election, she was the main spokesperson for Jean-Luc Mélenchon as he led the new party La France Insoumise. In late 2018, she left La France Insoumise for the left unity party Génération.s, and in 2019 she affiliated herself with the movement Pôle radical et écologiste.

== Early life and education ==
Soilihi grew up in the 4th district of Marseille, in a family with a Comoro-Moroccan background. As of 2019, Soilihi was a doctoral student in law at the Aix-Marseille University, where she has also been an instructor in criminal law.

== Athletic career ==
Soilihi has held national or global titles in two sports. In November 2015, Soilihi became a kickboxing champion as a result of a victory at the World Traditional Kickboxing Association. In 2016, she became a French champion of semi-contact karate.

== Political work ==
After witnessing a speech by Marie-Noëlle Lienemann, Soilihi joined the Socialist Party of France in 2012. During the 2014 municipal elections in Marseille, she was a candidate on the list of Patrick Mennucci. However, she was not elected in the ensuing contest with Jean-Claude Gaudin.

Soilihi also contested the departmental elections of 2015 in the 6th arrondissement of Marseille. Soilihi ran in a pair with a running mate, and they were eliminated in the first round. During the regional elections of 2015 in Provence-Alpes-Côte d'Azur, she was on the list led by the socialist Christophe Castaner, for whom she was also a spokesperson. This list came in third position at the end of the first round with 16.6% of the votes cast, but strategically withdrew in the second round to consolidate the opposition to the National Front, sacrificing any chances of obtaining seats in the election.

After being introduced to Jean-Luc Mélenchon by Sophia Chikirou (fr), Soilihi joined La France Insoumise in 2016 and became the national spokesperson for Mélenchon during his 2017 presidential campaign. She also co-wrote the movement's white paper Pour un sport émancipateur et libéré de l'argent. During the 2017 legislative elections she was also listed as the deputy to the socialist candidate Anne Di Marino in the third district of Bouches-du-Rhône, which was allegedly a mistake. This pairing lost in the first round with 18.5% of votes in the third position.

Soilihi withdrew from consideration as a candidate for La France Insoumise in the 2019 European Elections. On November 8, 2018, she announced that she would quit La France Insoumise due to strategic disagreements and concerns about infighting. She then joined the Génération.s movement created by Benoît Hamon and was placed second on the party list for Europeans. In preparation for the March 2020 municipal elections in Marseille, Soilihi affiliated with the Pôle radical et écologiste.
