= Bernard Roman =

French politician

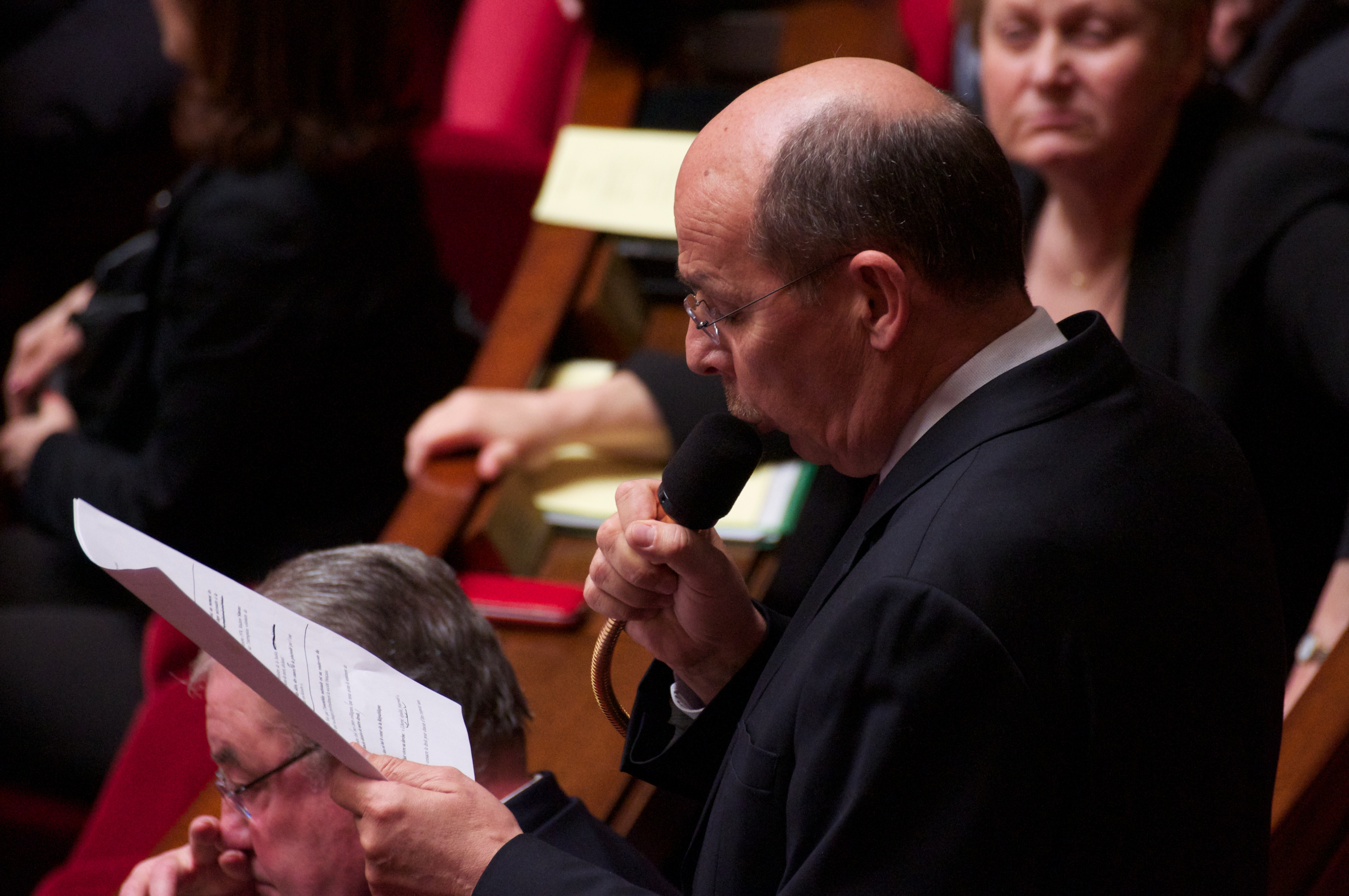
- Bernard Roman speaks in the same-sex marriage law vote, 2013

Member of the National Assembly for Nord's 1st constituency
- In office 12 June 1997 – 21 July 2016
- Preceded by: Colette Codaccioni
- Succeeded by: Adrien Quatennens

Deputy Mayor of Lille
- In office 1983–2004
- Mayor: Pierre Mauroy; Martine Aubry

Personal details
- Born: July 15, 1952 (age 72); Lille, France
- Political party: Socialist Party

Bernard Roman (born July 15, 1952 in Lille) was a member of the National Assembly of France. He represented Nord's 1st constituency from 1997 to 2017, as a member of the Socialiste, radical, citoyen et divers gauche.
