= Bouches-du-Rhône's 4th constituency =

Constituency of the National Assembly of France

4th constituency of Bouches-du-Rhône
- inline Constituency of the National Assembly of France

- Constituency in Bouches-du-Rhône Department (white area is the Étang de Berre lagoon)

- Bouches-du-Rhône in France
- Deputy: Manuel Bompard; LFI
- Department: Bouches-du-Rhône

The 4th constituency of Bouches-du-Rhône is a French legislative constituency in Bouches-du-Rhône.

== Geography ==
The constituency covers the centre of the city of Marseille.

== Historic representation ==
Election	Member	Party
1988	Guy Hermier	PCF
1993	Guy Hermier	PCF
1997	Guy Hermier	PCF
2001	Jean Dufour	PCF
2002	Frédéric Dutoit	PCF
2007	Henri Jibrayel	PS
2012	Patrick Mennucci	PS
2017	Jean-Luc Mélenchon	LFI
2022	Manuel Bompard	LFI
2024	Manuel Bompard	LFI

== Election results ==
=== 2024 ===
Candidate	Party	Alliance	First round			Second round		
Candidate	Party	Alliance	Votes	%	+/–	Votes	%	+/–
Manuel Bompard	LFI	NFP	26,712	67.49	+11.45			
Aurélie Quinquis	RN		5,973	15.09	+5.41			
Malika Torchi	RE	Ensemble	4,370	11.04	-3.84			
Carime Igo	LR	UDC	830	2.10	-2.65			
Anthony Demont	ECO		723	1.83	new			
Florian Trevisan	REC		323	0.82	-2.86			
Isabelle Bonnet	LO		256	0.65	-0.44			
Leila Behairi	ECO		204	0.52	new			
Stéphane Pernice	EXG		178	0.45	new			
Kylian Jacky Jean-Luc Visage	DIV		11	0.03	new			
Léa Felice Ferrandi	DIV		1	0.00	new			
Eva-Françoise Faye	DIV		0	0.00	new			
Votes			39,581	100.00				
Valid votes			39,581	98.10	-0.06			
Blank votes			459	1.14	-0.16			
Null votes			308	0.76	+0.23			
Turnout			40,348	59.95	+21.12			
Abstentions			26,955	40.05	-21.12			
Registered voters			67,303					
Result			LFI HOLD					

=== 2022 ===
Legislative Election 2022: Bouches-du-Rhône's 4th constituency
Party	Candidate	Votes	%	±%
LFI (NUPÉS)	Manuel Bompard	13,871	56.04	+9.30
LREM (Ensemble)	Najat Akodad	3,683	14.88	-7.78
RN	Julien Tellier	2,396	9.68	−1.24
LR (UDC)	Solange Biaggi	1,176	4.75	−5.88
REC	Sandrine Rastit	910	3.68	N/A
DVE	Elisabeth Vincetti	723	2.92	N/A
Others	N/A	1,993		
Turnout		25,215	38.83	−3.31
2nd round result
LFI (NUPÉS)	Manuel Bompard	17,118	73.92	+14.07
LREM (Ensemble)	Najat Akodad	6,040	26.08	−14.07
Turnout		23,158	37.59	+1.81
LFI hold				

=== 2017 ===
Candidate	Label	First round		Second round	
Candidate	Label	Votes	%	Votes	%
Jean-Luc Mélenchon	FI	8,460	34.31	11,912	59.85
Corinne Versini	REM	5,587	22.66	7,992	40.15
Patrick Mennucci	PS	3,065	12.43		
Jeanne Marti	FN	2,692	10.92		
Solange Biaggi	LR	2,621	10.63		
Lydie Gandon	ECO	409	1.66		
Jean Kergomard	DVG	221	0.90		
Halidi Aboubacar	DVG	200	0.81		
Zita Etoundi	DIV	194	0.79		
Nora Akhazzane	DIV	191	0.77		
Isabelle Bonnet	EXG	178	0.72		
Mohamed Naïli	DIV	155	0.63		
Cyril Bret	DIV	148	0.60		
Gabriel Duplaix	DLF	147	0.60		
Ferdinand Richard	DVG	133	0.54		
Martine Carpentier	EXD	111	0.45		
Léo-Hassan Tahiri	DIV	89	0.36		
Julie Bouhet-Massiani	REG	37	0.15		
Jean-Victor Shilling-Ford	DIV	23	0.09		
Selma Boudouaya	DVD	0	0.00		
Votes		24,661	100.00	19,904	100.00
Valid votes		24,661	98.02	19,904	93.21
Blank votes		304	1.21	1,061	4.97
Null votes		193	0.77	389	1.82
Turnout		25,158	42.14	21,354	35.78
Abstentions		34,540	57.86	38,331	64.22
Registered voters		59,698		59,685	
Source: Ministry of the Interior

=== 2012 ===
2012 legislative election in Bouches-du-Rhône's 4th constituency
Candidate	Party	First round		Second round	
Candidate	Party	Votes	%	Votes	%
Patrick Mennucci	PS	10,135	33.26%	19,163	70.51%
Marie-Claude Aucouturier	FN	4,356	14.30%	8,035	29.56%
Solange Biaggi	UMP	4,253	13.96%		
Lisette Narducci	DVG	4,135	13.57%		
Marie-José Cermolacce	FG	3,414	11.20%		
Sébastien Barles	EELV	1,882	6.18%		
Mohamed El Rharbaye	DVG	604	1.98%		
Sophie Goy	MoDem	354	1.16%		
Farid Soilihi	AEI	290	0.95%		
Bernard Talles	LT	216	0.71%		
Omar Djellil	SE	198	0.65%		
Thierry Noël	SE	159	0.52%		
Kévin Vacher	NPA	158	0.52%		
Gérald Ubaud	DLR	110	0.36%		
Rémy Bazzali	LO	77	0.25%		
Mihdhoir Ibrahima Said	SP	65	0.21%		
Victor Villodre	POI	64	0.21%		
Hamoud Benani	DVG	0	0.00%		
Valid votes		30,470	98.72%	27,178	95.30%
Spoilt and null votes		394	1.28%	1,339	4.70%
Votes cast / turnout		30,864	52.58%	28,517	48.58%
Abstentions		27,836	47.42%	30,179	51.42%
Registered voters		58,700	100.00%	58,696	100.00%

=== 2007 ===
Summary of the 10 June and 17 June 2007 French legislative election in Bouches-du-Rhône’s 4th Constituency
Candidate	Party		1st round		2nd round	
Candidate	Party		Votes	%	Votes	%
Henri Jibrayel	Socialist Party	PS	6,355	25.82%	13,224	57.41%
Bernard Susini	Union for a Popular Movement	UMP	6,249	25.39%	9,812	42.59%
Frédéric Dutoit	Communist	PCF	4,688	18.96%		
Karim Zeribi	Miscellaneous Left	DVG	2,748	11.16%		
Jean-Pierre Baumann	Front National	FN	2,075	8.43%		
Slimane Azzoug	Democratic Movement	MoDem	690	2.80%		
Christophe Jerez	Movement for France	MPF	308	1.25%		
Joëlle Boulay	The Greens	VEC	284	1.15%		
Michel Gruselle	Far Left	EXG	254	1.03%		
Eméa Vlaemynck	Ecologist	ECO	222	0.90%		
Hubert Savon	Far Right	EXD	202	0.82%		
Hassani Said	Ecologist	ECO	159	0.65%		
Sylvie Moyen	Far Left	EXG	152	0.62%		
André Pibarot	Miscellaneous Right	DVD	124	0.50%		
Régine Seren	Independent	DIV	62	0.25%		
Raoul Cayol	Miscellaneous Right	DVD	60	0.24%		
Marcelle Keller	Independent	DIV	2	0.01%		
Total			24,614	100%	23,036	100%
Registered voters			48,055		48,045	
Blank/Void ballots			359	1.44%	1,001	4.16%
Turnout			24,973	51.97%	24,037	50.03%
Abstentions			23,082	48.03%	24,008	49.97%
Result					PS GAIN	

=== 2002 ===
Legislative Election 2002: Bouches-du-Rhône's 4th constituency
Party	Candidate	Votes	%	±%
PCF	Frédéric Dutoit	6,163	25.86	
FN	Jean-Pierre Baumann	5,824	24.44	
PS	Patrick Mennucci	4,280	17.96	
UMP	Francois Franceschi	3,956	16.60	
PR	Karim Zeribi	1,021	4.28	
MNR	Hubert Savon	912	3.83	
Others	N/A	1,677		
Turnout		24,163	56.40	
2nd round result
PCF	Frédéric Dutoit	13,272	64.80	
FN	Jean-Pierre Baumann	7,208	35.20	
Turnout		21,430	50.03	
PCF hold				

=== 1997 ===
Legislative Election 1997: Bouches-du-Rhône's 4th constituency
Party	Candidate	Votes	%	±%
FN	Jean-Jacques Susini	7,875	30.89	
PCF	Guy Hermier	7,733	30.34	
PRG	Michel Dary	3,740	14.67	
RPR	Bernard Chatel	2,787	10.93	
DIV	Jean-Jacques Leonetti	847	3.32	
GE	Lucien Vassal	685	2.69	
Others	N/A	1,824		
Turnout		26,207	59.98	
2nd round result
PCF	Guy Hermier	15,363	58.36	
FN	Jean-Jacques Susini	10,960	41.64	
Turnout		27,836	63.71	
PCF hold				
