= Manuel Bompard =

French politician (born 1986)

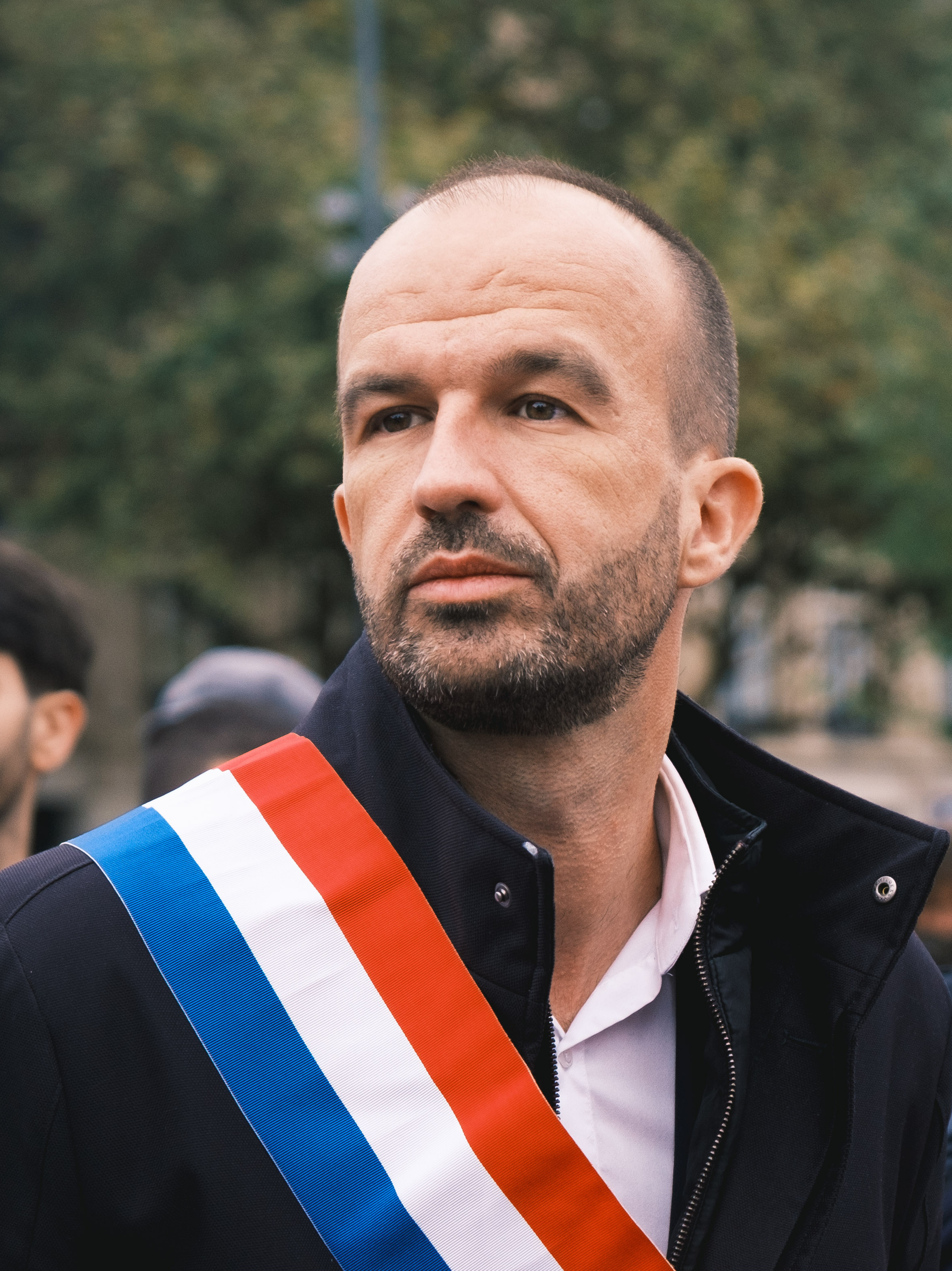
- Bompard in 2024

Member of the National Assembly for Bouches-du-Rhône's 4th constituency
- Incumbent
- Assumed office 22 June 2022
- Preceded by: Jean-Luc Mélenchon

National Coordinator of La France Insoumise
- Incumbent
- Assumed office 10 December 2022
- Preceded by: Adrien Quatennens

Member of the European Parliament
- In office 2 July 2019 – 28 July 2022
- Succeeded by: Marina Mesure
- Constituency: France

Personal details
- Born: 30 March 1986 (age 40) Firminy, France
- Party: La France Insoumise
- Education: Grenoble Institute of Technology; University of Nice Sophia-Antipolis

Manuel Bompard (French: [manɥɛl bɔ̃paʁ]; born 30 March 1986) is a French politician who has represented the 4th constituency of the Bouches-du-Rhône department in the National Assembly since 2022.

A member of La France Insoumise (LFI), he served as a Member of the European Parliament from 2019 to 2022.

Manuel Bompard was the campaign director of Jean-Luc Mélenchon for the 2017 presidential election and the 2022 presidential election.

In 2023, Jean-Luc Mélenchon appointed him coordinator of La France Insoumise. While Bompard is technically leader of the party, he only manages day-to-day affairs. Melenchon remains the de facto leader.

== Early life and education ==
Manuel Bompard was born in 1986 in Firminy, Loire. He grew up in Drôme. His father is a computer scientist, then a farmer, his mother is a public servant in the housing sector.

He graduated from ENSIMAG's engineering school in Grenoble. He was awarded a doctorate in mathematics in 2011, having defended a thesis of applied mathematics in aeronautics at the University of Nice Sophia Antipolis. He worked in a startup specialised in machine learning in Ramonville-Saint-Agne, Haute-Garonne.

=== Left Party ===
Bompard entered politics at the age of 19 during the movement in opposition to the European Constitutional Treaty in 2005 and against the First Employment Contract (CPE) in 2006.

He became a founding member of the Left Party (PG) in 2009 and became its national secretary in 2010. In 2012, he was part of the events team for Jean-Luc Mélenchon's presidential election campaign.

Bompard succeeded François Delapierre as Jean-Luc Mélenchon's campaign manager for the 2014 European elections in the South-West constituency.

He stood in the 2015 departmental elections in Haute-Garonne in the Toulouse-5 constituency, alongside Dagmara Szlagor of EELV. They obtained 15.41% of the votes cast, but only 6.55% of those registered, which meant that they were unable to reach the second round (12.5% of those registered being required).

=== La France Insoumise ===
Bompard then became Jean-Luc Mélenchon's campaign manager for the 2017 presidential election, on behalf of La France Insoumise (LFI). In particular, he organised several key events in the campaign: the October 2016 convention in Lille, the march on 18 March 2017 between Place de la Bastille and Place de la République, the digital campaign platform and Mélenchon's hologram at an Aubervilliers rally.

==== 2017 legislative election candidacy ====
Bompard was a candidate in the 2017 legislative election in Haute-Garonne's 9th constituency, for LFI, with Laure Tachoires as his running mate. He came second in the first round with 18.91% of the vote and was defeated in the second round with 47.67% of the vote by Sandrine Mörch of La République en marche.

==== Party manager and coordinator ====
In the spring of 2018, Bompard took part in the electoral committee responsible for evaluating and selecting the candidacies of activists wishing to appear on the list for the 2019 European election. At the end of this process, he was ranked first among the male candidates and the possibility was raised that he could head the list. As part of the composition of this list of candidates, he was strongly criticised by one of the 32 members of the party committee for locking in, 'petty arrangements between friends' and control over eligible positions, citing in particular the case of Sarah Soilihi, who was allegedly 'ousted' from the 'top four' candidates and therefore wished to be removed from the list. Another member removed from the list, Georges Kuzmanovic, criticised Bompard for being both judge and jury in the composition of the list, in a context where several ideological lines (a 'sovereignist' one and a 'leftist' one) seemed to clash within LFI, which Manuel Bompard denied.

In 2021, he was again appointed Mélenchon's campaign manager for the 2022 presidential election.

==== Member of the European Parliament ====
Bompard left the leadership of the Left Party in July 2018 to devote himself to his role as spokesperson for La France Insoumise and to the European election campaign. Initially approached to lead the LFI list for the 2019 European election, he ended up in second place on the list of candidates (behind Manon Aubry). The LFI list obtained 6.3% of the vote, which was below the voting intentions recorded by IFOP, which had never fallen below 7%. This score gave LFI six MEP seats. At the European Parliament, Bompard became the representative of the LFI delegation.

==== Deputy in the 16th legislature ====
Ahead of the 2022 legislative election, Jean-Luc Mélenchon declined to stand for re-election in the Bouches-du-Rhône's 4th constituency, which includes the first three arrondissements of Marseille, where almost 40% of the population lives below the poverty line, and more mixed neighbourhoods such as La Plaine and Cours Julien. Bompard replaced him as the candidate for the New Ecological and Social People's Union. He came out well ahead in the first round, with 56.4% of the votes cast, one of his party's best results nationwide. He was elected to the National Assembly in the second round, with 73.9% of votes cast against the candidate of the Ensemble coalition. He became a member of the National Assembly's Finance Committee.

Due to a ban on holding multiple offices, he resigned from his position in the European Parliament. He was replaced by Marina Mesure.

Since October 2022, Manuel Bompard has been president of the Association La France insoumise with Mathilde Panot as secretary and Maxime Charpentier, a member of LFI, as treasurer.

In December 2022, a new leadership of LFI was organised, without an election, around Bompard. A number of prominent figures from the party, who were excluded, complained of a lack of democracy. Bompard refuted these criticisms, stating: "Voting is not necessarily the alpha and omega of democracy. The aim is to be as effective as possible."

In September 2023, following the French government's ban on the wearing of abayas in schools, Bompard sought to overturn the measure by referring the matter to the Conseil d'État, which upheld the ban; he deplored future discrimination against Muslim girls.

In March 2023, he called for the 'abolition of the conscience clause' for doctors in France, which allows them to refuse to perform an abortion. According to him, this measure prevents a quarter of women who wish to have an abortion from doing so. Studies have seemingly not confirmed this assertion: 17% of women (not 25%) have an abortion outside the département they live in. There are several reasons for this, including unequal access to abortion facilities and a desire on the part of the women in question to guarantee the confidentiality of the procedure.

==== 2024 snap legislative election ====
Bompard stood for re-election in the 2024 legislative election after taking part in the creation of the New Popular Front (NFP) alongside Olivier Faure, Marine Tondelier and Fabien Roussel. He represented the NFP before the 1st round in a prime-time televised debate against RN lead candidate Jordan Bardella and then-Prime Minister Gabriel Attal on TF1 on 25 June.

==== Deputy in the 17th legislature ====
He was one of people targeted in a terrorist attack using a bomb in a package, together with presenter Estelle Denis and comedian Élodie Poux.

== Conviction for rebellion ==
On 16 October 2018, as part of preliminary investigations into Mélenchon's 2017 campaign finances and alleged fictitious employment at the European Parliament, a search was carried out by the French Central Office for Combating Corruption and Financial and Tax Offences at the headquarters of La France Insoumise. Bompard, alongside Mélenchon, was involved in the exchanges with the police. A correctional trial was held in Bobigny in September 2019 for 'acts of intimidation against judicial authority, rebellion and provocation'. On 9 December 2019, he was sentenced to a €7,000 fine.

== Targeting by a far-right website ==
On 2 October 2023, Bompard co-signed an article in L'Humanité defending freedom of information, and the following day was included on the far-right website Reseau-libre.org's 'list of candidates for a bullet in the back of the head'.

== Sources ==
- Haquemand, Éric (20 April 2017), "Manuel Bompard, le chef d'orchestre de Mélenchon", Paris Match (in French)
- Laurens, Guillaume (22 May 2017), "Législatives : Manuel Bompard, le bras droit de Mélenchon, veut faire virer la Ville rose au rouge", Côté Toulouse (in French), archived from the original on 5 June 2017
- Michalon, Noé (5 March 2017), "Manuel Bompard, le supercalculateur derrière Mélenchon", Slate (in French)
