= Aurélien Le Coq =

French politician

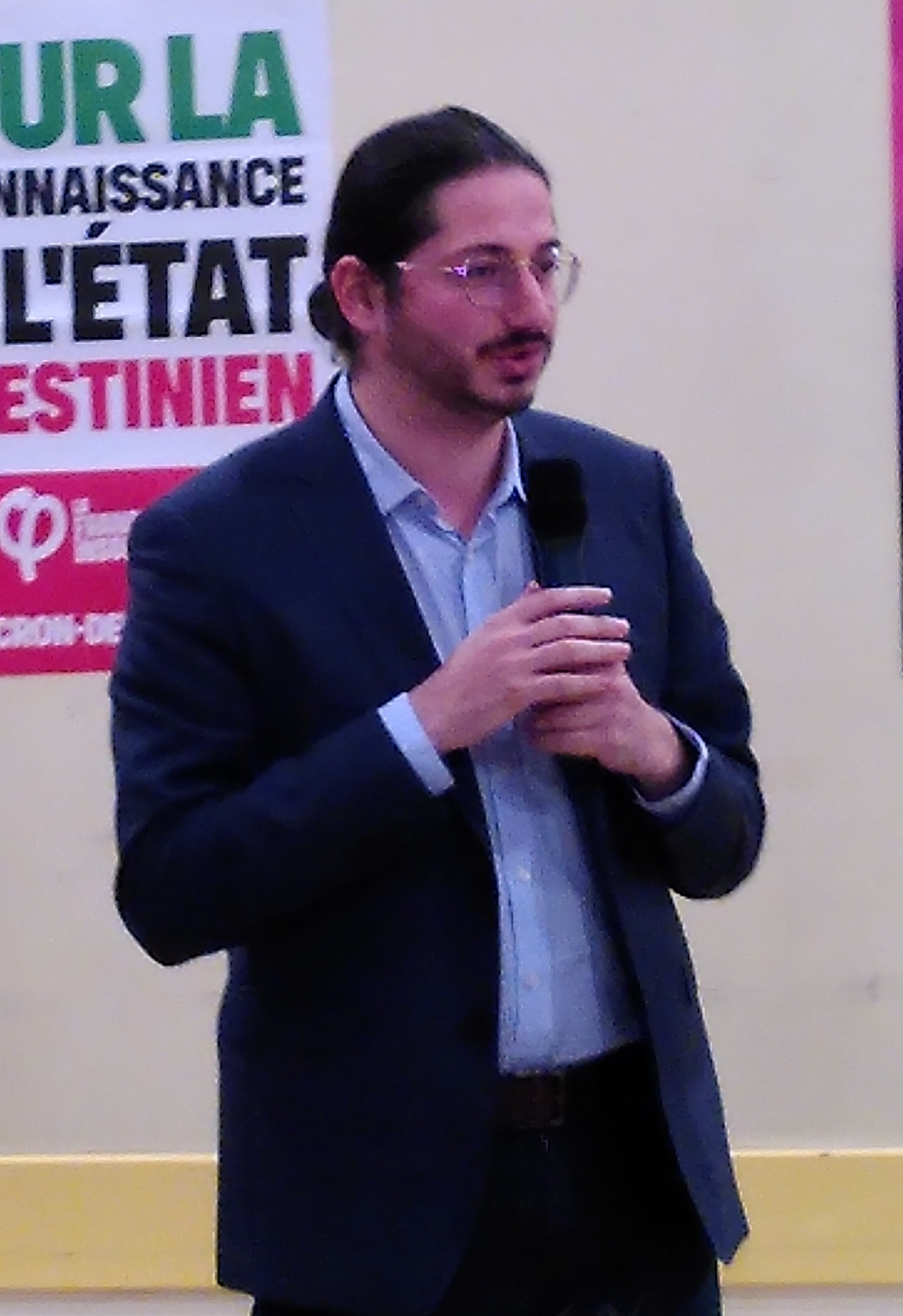
- Aurélien Le Coq in 2024.

Member of the National Assembly for Nord's 1st constituency
- Incumbent
- Assumed office 18 July 2024
- Preceded by: Adrien Quatennens

Personal details
- Born: 28 September 1996 (age 30) Paris, France
- Party: La France Insoumise (since 2016); NFP (2024); Left Party (until 2016)
- Education: Institut d'études politiques de Lille; University of Lille

Aurélien Le Coq (born 28 September 1996) is a French politician of La France Insoumise (LFI). He was elected member of the National Assembly for Nord's 1st constituency in 2024.

Le Coq was initially involved with the Left Party, and joined La France Insoumise upon its founding in 2016. As of 2024, he had served as leader of LFI's youth wing Jeunes insoumis for more than 5 years.
