= Guy Hermier =

French politician (1940–2001)

- Born: 22 February 1940; Créteil, Val-de-Marne, France
- Died: 28 July 2001 (aged 61); Marseille, Bouches-du-Rhône, France
- Resting place: Cimetière Saint-Pierre
- Occupation: Politician
- Political party: French Communist Party

Guy Hermier (1940–2001) was a French politician. He served as a member of the National Assembly from 1978 to 2001, representing Bouches-du-Rhône's 4th constituency. He managed to get along with members of the Socialist Party in Marseille, at a time when Communists and Socialists did not always see eye to eye. He was buried in the Saint-Pierre Cemetery in Marseille.
