= Jean Dufour =

French politician (1949–2020)

- Born: 5 April 1949; Saint-Martin-Valmeroux, Cantal, France
- Died: 15 March 2020 (aged 70)
- Occupation: Politician
- Political party: French Communist Party

Jean Dufour (5 April 1949 – 15 March 2020) was a French politician. He was a member of the French Communist Party. He served as a member of the National Assembly from 2001 to 2002, representing Bouches-du-Rhône's 4th constituency.
