= Nord's 1st constituency =

Constituency of the National Assembly of France

1st constituency of Nord
- inline Constituency of the National Assembly of France

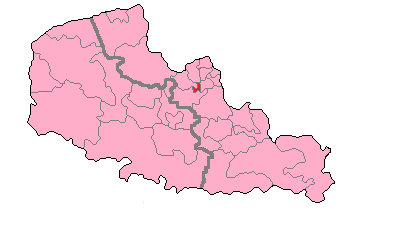
- Nord's 1st Constituency shown within Nord-Pas-de-Calais
- Deputy: Aurélien Le Coq; LFI
- Department: Nord
- Cantons: Lille-Centre, Lille-Sud, Lille-Sud-Est (part)
- Registered voters: 60,531

The 1st constituency of Nord is a French legislative constituency in the Nord département.

== Description ==
The 1st constituency of Nord covers the centre and south of the city Lille.

In the early years of the Fifth Republic the seat was held by Gaullist parties for the first two decades of the 21st century. It was a comfortable seat for the Socialist Party. La France Insoumise took the seat in the 2017 election.

== Historic representation ==
Election	Member	Party
1958	Bertrand Motte	CNIP
1962	Louis Christiaens	UNR
1967	Louis Christiaens	UDR
1968	François-Xavier Ortoli	UDR
1968	Gabriel Vancalster	UDR
1973	Norbert Ségard	UDR
1974	Robert Valbrun	UDR
1978	Norbert Ségard	UDF
1978	Georges Delfosse	UDF
1981	Georges Delfosse	UDF
1986	Proportional representation - no election by constituency	
1988	Pierre Mauroy	PS
1993	Colette Codaccioni	RPR
1995	Jacques Richir	RPR
1997	Bernard Roman	PS
2002	Bernard Roman	PS
2007	Bernard Roman	PS
2012	Bernard Roman	PS
2017	Adrien Quatennens	LFI
2022	Adrien Quatennens	LFI
2024	Aurélien Le Coq	LFI

== Election results ==
=== 2024 ===
Legislative Election 2024: Nord's 1st constituency
Party	Candidate	Votes	%	±%
DIV	Allison Marinho	610	1.51	N/A
EXG	Line Marage	0	0.00	
LR	Brice Lauret	1,951	4.85	N/A
LO	Pierre Madelain	217	0.54	N/A
MoDem (Ensemble)	Vanessa Duhamel	7,055	17.52	−3.55
LFI (NFP)	Aurélien Le Coq	17,800	44.20	−7.85
DIV	Maxime Legrand	1169	2.90	N/A
DIV	Michel Laurençot	190	0.49	N/A
RN	Carole Leclercq	7298	18.12	−2.95
Volt	Verena Priem	58	0.14	N/A
DVG	Amy Bah	3,551	8.82	N/A
DVC	Audric Alexandre	345	0.86	
DIV	Frédéric Chaouat	14	0.03	N/A
DIV	Adel Bousalham	1	0.00	N/A
Turnout		40,268	98.35	+52.70
Registered electors		61,672		
2nd round result
LFI	Aurélien Le Coq	27,116	75.49	+31.29
RN	Carole Leclercq	8802	24.51	+6.39
Turnout		35,918	90.82	−7.52
Registered electors		61,712		
LFI hold		Swing		

=== 2022 ===
Legislative Election 2022: Nord's 1st constituency
Party	Candidate	Votes	%	±%
LFI (NUPÉS)	Adrien Quatennens	15,000	52.05	+16.07
MoDem (Ensemble)	Vanessa Duhamel	6,071	21.07	-11.54
RN	Carole Laclercq	2,960	10.27	−0.64
UDI (UDC)	Thomas Fabre	1,984	6.88	−6.92
DVG	Audric Alexandre	782	2.71	N/A
REC	Mai Rimlinger	782	2.71	N/A
PA	Constance Godest	669	2.32	N/A
Others	N/A	570	1.98	
Turnout		28,818	45.65	+1.19
2nd round result
LFI (NUPÉS)	Adrien Quatennens	17,428	65.24	+15.13
MoDem (Ensemble)	Vanessa Duhamel	9,284	34.76	−15.13
Turnout		26,712	43.87	+5.52
LFI hold				

=== 2017 ===
Candidate	Label	First round		Second round	
Candidate	Label	Votes	%	Votes	%
Christophe Itier	REM	8,810	32.61	10,989	49.89
Adrien Quatennens	FI	5,236	19.38	11,039	50.11
Nicolas Lebas	UDI	3,728	13.80		
Éric Dillies	FN	2,947	10.91		
François Lamy	PS	2,470	9.14		
Anne Mikolajczak	ECO	1,383	5.12		
Hugo Vandamme	PCF	631	2.34		
Chantal Pote	ECO	382	1.41		
Patrice Hanriot	DIV	278	1.03		
Caroline Soualle	DIV	258	0.95		
Nicole Baudrin	EXG	246	0.91		
Maxime Royer	DIV	170	0.63		
Abdelaziz Zaddi	ECO	162	0.60		
Isabelle Koining	ECO	121	0.45		
Slimane Abdelkafar	DIV	121	0.45		
Véronique Demolliens	REG	37	0.14		
Hervé Decaux	DIV	26	0.10		
Lucie Dubus	DIV	7	0.03		
Olivier Capelle	DIV	3	0.01		
Camille Colliot	DIV	2	0.01		
Tristan Duval	EXG	1	0.00		
Pierre Rodriguez	DIV	0	0.00		
Valentine Rambert	DVD	0	0.00		
Stéphane Étienne	DIV	0	0.00		
Virginie de Cesare	DIV	0	0.00		
Votes		27,019	100.00	22,028	100.00
Valid votes		27,019	98.45	22,028	93.05
Blank votes		291	1.06	1,133	4.79
Null votes		135	0.49	512	2.16
Turnout		27,445	44.46	23,673	38.35
Abstentions		34,284	55.54	38,056	61.65
Registered voters		61,729		61,729	
Source: Ministry of the Interior

=== 2012 ===
Legislative Election 2012: Nord's 1st constituency
Party	Candidate	Votes	%	±%
PS	Bernard Roman	12,313	41.68	+1.51
UMP	Hervé-Marie Morelle	6,384	21.61	−5.03
FN	Eric Dillies	3,980	13.47	+7.63
FG	Joseph Demeulemeester	2,423	8.20	+5.96
EELV	Elise Jeanne	1,960	6.63	+2.06
MoDem	Yves Delahaie	833	2.82	N/A
Others	N/A	1,652		
Turnout		29,545	48.81	−3.81
2nd round result
PS	Bernard Roman	17,390	64.94	+3.19
UMP	Hervé-Marie Morelle	9,388	35.06	−3.19
Turnout		26,778	44.24	−6.38
PS hold				

=== 2007 ===
Legislative Election 2007: Nord's 1st constituency
Party	Candidate	Votes	%	±%
PS	Bernard Roman	12,267	40.17	+0.63
UMP	Khalida Sellali	8,135	26.64	−4.22
FN	Philippe Bernard	1,784	5.84	−6.94
LV	Frédéric Sarkis	1,397	4.57	+0.92
Far left	Jan Pauwels	976	3.20	N/A
PCF	Franck Jakubek	684	2.24	−0.07
Others	N/A	1,076		
Turnout		30,928	52.62	−1.17
2nd round result
PS	Bernard Roman	17,772	61.75	+5.86
UMP	Khalida Sellali	11,007	38.25	−5.86
Turnout		29,752	50.62	−0.13
PS hold				

=== 2002 ===
Legislative Election 2002: Nord's 1st constituency
Party	Candidate	Votes	%	±%
PS	Bernard Roman	12,215	39.54	+3.01
UMP	Claude Olivier	9,531	30.86	+4.28
FN	Philippe Bernard	3,949	12.78	−2.99
LV	Sarah Pheulpin	1,128	3.65	−0.70
PCF	Laurence Cagnon	715	2.31	−4.27
PR	Francoise Dal	676	2.19	N/A
Others	N/A	2,675		
Turnout		31,435	53.79	−5.39
2nd round result
PS	Bernard Roman	16,003	55.89	−2.51
UMP	Claude Olivier	12,630	44.11	+2.51
Turnout		29,655	50.75	−11.96
PS hold				

=== 1997 ===
Legislative Election 1997: Nord's 1st constituency
Party	Candidate	Votes	%	±%
PS	Bernard Roman	11,699	36.53	
RPR	Colette Codaccioni	8,511	26.58	
FN	Eliane Coolzaet	5,050	15.77	
PCF	Françoise Hénaut	2,108	6.58	
LV	René Penet	1,393	4.35	
LO	Nicole Baudrin	1,179	3.68	
DVD	Marie-Anne Mirabel	702	2.19	
Others	N/A	1,380		
Turnout		33,166	59.18	
2nd round result
PS	Bernard Roman	19,415	58.40	
RPR	Colette Codaccioni	13,828	41.60	
Turnout		35,159	62.71	
PS gain from RPR				

== Sources ==
Official results of French elections from 2002: "Résultats électoraux officiels en France" (in French).
