= Valence Congress =

The Valence Congress was the ninth national congress of the French Socialist Party (Parti socialiste or PS). It took place from 23 to 25 October 1981, shortly after Mitterrand's 1981 election.

== Results ==
Popular vote
| Jospin | 94.6% |

Lionel Jospin was re-elected as First Secretary.
