= Patrick Mennucci =

French politician (born 1955)

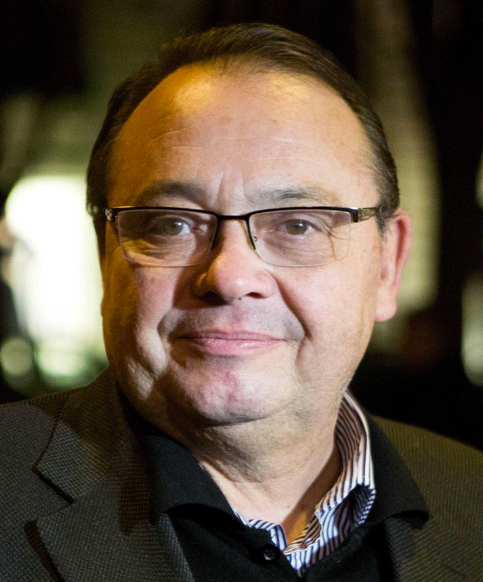

Member of the National Assembly for Bouches-du-Rhône's 4th constituency
- In office 17 June 2012 – 18 June 2017
- Preceded by: Jean Roatta
- Succeeded by: Jean-Luc Mélenchon

Personal details
- Born: 8 April 1955 (age 71) Marseille, France
- Party: Socialist Party
- Education: Sciences Po Aix

Patrick Mennucci (born 8 April 1955 in Marseille, Bouches-du-Rhône) is a French politician and a member of the Socialist Party. He had been the MP of the Bouches-du-Rhône's 4th constituency from June 2012 to June 2017, where he was defeated by Jean-Luc Mélenchon of La France insoumise party.

== Studies ==
Patrick Mennucci studied political sciences at the Institut d'études politiques d'Aix-en-Provence as well as business at the Euromed Management – School of Management and Business.
