= Jean-Luc Mélenchon =

French politician (born 1951)

- Mélenchon in 2026

President of the La France Insoumise group in the National Assembly
- In office 27 June 2017 – 12 October 2021
- Preceded by: Position established
- Succeeded by: Mathilde Panot

Member of the National Assembly for Bouches-du-Rhône's 4th constituency
- In office 21 June 2017 – 21 June 2022
- Preceded by: Patrick Mennucci
- Succeeded by: Manuel Bompard

Member of the European Parliament
- In office 14 July 2009 – 18 June 2017
- Constituency: South-West France

Minister Delegate for Vocational Education
- In office 27 March 2000 – 6 May 2002
- Prime Minister: Lionel Jospin
- Preceded by: Claude Allègre
- Succeeded by: Luc Ferry

Senator for Essonne
- In office 1 October 2004 – 7 January 2010
- In office 2 October 1986 – 27 April 2000

Personal details
- Born: Jean-Luc Antoine Pierre Mélenchon; 19 August 1951 (age 75) Tangier International Zone (Note: Jointly administered by various states until 1956.)
- Party: La France Insoumise (since 2016)
- Other political affiliations: OCI (1972–1976); Socialist Party (1976–2008); Left Front (2008–2016); Left Party (since 2009)
- Spouse: Bernadette Abriel (divorced)
- Children: 1
- Education: University of Franche-Comté: Lic., Philosophy; CAPES, Modern Literature
- Website: Official website European Party website

Jean-Luc Antoine Pierre Mélenchon (French pronunciation: [ʒɑ̃ lyk ɑ̃twan pjɛʁ melɑ̃ʃɔ̃]; born 19 August 1951) is a French left-wing politician who has been the de facto leader of La France Insoumise (LFI) since it was established in 2016. He was the deputy in the National Assembly for the 4th constituency of Bouches-du-Rhône from 2017 to 2022 and led the La France Insoumise group in the National Assembly from 2017 to 2021. Mélenchon was previously elected as a Member of the European Parliament (MEP) in 2009 and reelected in 2014. He has run for President of France three times, in 2012, 2017 and 2022. In 2026 he announced his candidacy for the 2027 French presidential election.

He started his political career as a member of the Internationalist Communist Organisation. After joining the Socialist Party (PS) in 1976, Mélenchon was successively elected a municipal councillor of Massy (1983) and general councillor of Essonne (1985). In 1986, he entered the Senate, to which he was reelected in 1995 and 2004. He also served as Minister for Vocational Education between 2000 and 2002 under Minister of National Education Jack Lang in the cohabitation government of Lionel Jospin.

He was part of the left wing of the PS until the Reims Congress of November 2008, when he left the party to found the Left Party with Marc Dolez, a member of the National Assembly. Mélenchon first served as party president before becoming party co-president alongside Martine Billard, a position he held until 2014. As co-president of the Left Party, he joined the electoral coalition of the Left Front before the 2009 European Parliament election in France. He was elected as a MEP in the South-West France constituency and reelected in 2014. He became the Left Front's candidate in the 2012 French presidential election, in which he came in fourth, receiving 11.1% of the first-round vote.

In February 2016, Mélenchon founded La France Insoumise. He stood as a candidate in the 2017 French presidential election, again coming in fourth, with 19.6% of the first-round vote. He became a member of the National Assembly for LFI following the 2017 French legislative election, receiving 59.9% in the second round in the 4th constituency of Bouches-du-Rhône, located in Marseille (France's second-largest city). Mélenchon stood again under the LFI banner in the 2022 French presidential election, coming in third with 21.95% of the vote, just over one point short of qualifying for the second round. After this, he led the newly formed New Ecological and Social People's Union (NUPES) alliance of parties to a second-place performance in the 2022 French legislative election. LFI was confirmed as the largest party of the French left in the 2024 French legislative election, where the left-wing New Popular Front (NFP) achieved a plurality of seats and LFI was confirmed as the largest left-wing group in the National Assembly.

== Early life and education ==
Jean-Luc Mélenchon was born on 19 August 1951 in Tangier, Morocco, to a family of Spanish and Italian descent who settled in French Algeria. His father, Georges Mélenchon (1922–2007), was a postmaster, while his mother, Jeannine Bayona (1928–2006), was a primary school teacher. Following his parents' divorce in 1960, Mélenchon moved to mainland France with his mother in 1962.

Mélenchon finished his baccalauréat at the Rouget-de-Lisle high school in Lons-le-Saunier in 1969. He then entered the University of Franche-Comté (now the Marie and Louis Pasteur University) in Besançon, where he received a licentiate in Philosophy and a CAPES in Modern Literature from the Faculty of Arts and Humanities. Having obtained his CAPES, he became a teacher before entering politics. During his university years, he became involved in student activism through the UNEF union. Originally a follower of Pierre Lambert, Mélenchon was also member of the Internationalist Communist Organisation.

== Biography ==
=== Socialist Mitterrandist leader (1976–1986) ===
Mélenchon left Besançon to enter professional life in Lons-le-Saunier (Jura), and joined the Socialist Party in September 1976. He was part of the democratic socialist and left-wing of the PS. Mélenchon did not join the French Communist Party (PCF) because of the latter's refusal to condemn the Warsaw Pact invasion of Czechoslovakia in 1968 to end the Prague Spring, an event that he said had significantly affected him in political terms, even more than the protests of 1968, which occurred when he was still a university student and he became leader of the student movement at the University of Besançon, and was one of the causes of his joining in 1972 the Internationalist Communist Organisation.

As a member of the PS, he soon assumed local and departmental responsibilities (deputy section secretary of Montaigu), and developed a federal newspaper that fought for a union between the PS and the PCF. It was at this time that the latter broke the agreements of the union of the left on a joint program of government. He then came to the attention of Claude Germon, mayor of Massy (Essonne) and member of the executive office of the PS responsible for the business section. Without stable work after his application was rejected at the Croix du Jura newspaper, he was hired by Claude Germon to become his private secretary.

Mélenchon became one of the leading Mitterrandist leaders of the Essonne federation, which led him to the position of first secretary of this federation at the Valence Congress in 1981; he remained in this position until 1986. He positioned himself both against the "Second left" of Michel Rocard and the Centre of Socialist Studies, Research, and Education (CERES) of Jean-Pierre Chevènement. He was elected senator during the senatorials of 1986, and again in 1995 and 2004.

A supporter of Mitterrand and left-wing reformist socialism, Mélenchon presented two lectures about Mitterrand's presidency, "1981: The Revolution Suspended" and "A Complete Balance Sheet of François Mitterand's presidency". He saw Mitterand's win in 1981 as the end of a political process of which the main accelerator was "the ten million workers on strike" in the protests of 1968.

He argued that the reforms introduced by Mitterrand were more wide-ranging than often recognised, citing the nationalisation of dozens of banks electricity companies, engineering companies, and motorways, the doubling of the budget of the Ministry of Culture, and increased taxes for the rich, and against the perceived betrayal on the part of Mitterrand and the other left-wing leaders. According to Mélenchon, the blame for the turn to austerity rest on a lack of political courage, a lack of strategy on the left of the left, and a lack of mass mobilisation.

=== Socialist Party (1986–2008) ===
He was elected senator in the 1986 French Senate elections.

=== From the Socialist Left to For the Social Republic (1988–2005) ===
A founder, along with Julien Dray, of the Socialist Left in 1988, he opposed the open-door policy of François Mitterrand's second presidency, targeting Michel Rocard and the "soft left," as well as France's entry into the Gulf War (first Gulf War), against the majority of his party and President Thierry.

At the 1990 Rennes Congress, where no motion reached 30%, the party's left wing was divided into four factions. Mélenchon led his own motion, which obtained 1.35% of the vote. In June 1990, he submitted a bill to the Senate for the creation of a civil partnership contract, a precursor to what would become the Civil Solidarity Pact (PACS) in 1999.

In April 1992, he was defeated in the Massy-Ouest canton, which he had won in 1985: his 38.43% was insufficient compared to the 39.71% of the right-wing candidate, Vincent Delahaye. He attributes his defeat by 73 votes to Guy Bonneau's (Génération écologie) remaining in the second round.

In 1992, he called for a vote in favour of the Maastricht Treaty, which he considered a "left-wing compromise". In a speech to the Senate, he considers that the single currency is the major instrument that will allow Europe to be "carrier of civilization, culture, networks of solidarity" against the dollar, which. In this vein, he expressed regret over the Danish vote on the Maastricht Treaty, stating: "As cruel as it may be to hear, nations can be mistaken. Ours has already made a mistake, and we know the price that history has paid for missing the boat."

While continuing to defend the existence of the single currency, he quickly regretted his choice regarding the Maastricht Treaty and, along with the Socialist Left, submitted an amendment, entitled "Turning the page on Maastricht," to a 1996 Socialist Party convention. He later declared that the opponents of this treaty were right and that the stated objective at the time was a "total failure".

A long-standing and stable faction, the Socialist Left presented its own motion at three Socialist Party congresses until its dissolution in 2002. It obtained scores ranging from 7.3% to 13.3% of the votes cast.

Although a Mitterrand supporter, Mélenchon backed Michel Rocard's appointment as First Secretary of the Socialist Party in 1993, which allowed him to gain a leadership position within the party, as he became press secretary: "Rocard, who advocated consensus when he was Prime Minister, no longer speaks of an alliance with centrists but of an axis with socialists, communists, and ecologists. That's the change...".

At the 1997 Brest Congress, Mélenchon ran for First Secretary of the Socialist Party (PS). The only opponent to François Hollande, he obtained 8.81% of the vote, a lower score than the Socialist Left motion, and he experienced this defeat as a humiliation. (Note: Alemagna & Alliès 2012, p. 137) In 2009, he claimed that François Hollande had not kept his word to grant him a score of 15% as per their agreement and indicated that he had told him he would never forgive him.

On April 22 and 23, 1998, he went against the party's position and was the only senator from the Socialist group to vote against the bill integrating the Bank of France into the European System of Central Banks and against the resolution on the transition to the euro. He asserted on this occasion that, faced with transnational capitalism, European economic integration gives the illusion of power, while in fact it is a means of confinement. Following this vote, he was sanctioned, along with five other parliamentarians, by the national bureau of the Socialist Party and received a letter of reprimand from the First Secretary, François Hollande.

In the following months, Mélenchon and his colleagues in the Socialist Left opposed the Treaty of Amsterdam, which they criticized in particular for the lack of economic governance and the insufficient progress towards a social Europe. According to them, this treaty constitutes a threat to the French social model and can only lead to "serious social and economic risks, dangerous for democracy" During the ratification of the treaty in Congress on January 18, 1999, he was one of the five Socialist members of parliament to vote against the text.

In March 2000, he agreed to participate in the Lionel Jospin government as Minister Delegate for Vocational Education under the Minister of National Education, Jack Lang, after having declined the positions of Secretary of State, Minister of State for Housing in 1997 and for Overseas Territories. His time at this junior ministry was notably marked by a reform of the Vocational Aptitude Certificates (CAP), a reform of the Validation of Acquired Skills, and the creation of the "Vocational High School" label. He held this position until the 2002 French presidential election, which saw the Socialist Prime Minister, Lionel Jospin, eliminated in the first round.

Following the electoral defeat of April 2002, when the faction led by Julien Dray chose to join François Hollande's team, Mélenchon co-founded the New World (Socialist Party) movement with Henri Emmanuelli. Their motion obtained 16.3% of the vote at the Dijon congress, a score equivalent to that of the New Socialist Party (2003), the other main left-wing faction within the party.

After the "Yes" vote won in the internal referendum of the Socialist Party on the draft treaty establishing a Constitution for Europe, he broke with his party's instructions and campaigned alongside Marie-George Buffet (French Communist Party|PCF), Olivier Besancenot (Revolutionary Communist League|LCR) and José Bové (Peasant Confederation) at rallies for the "no" vote. The "no" campaign led to the split of the New World (Socialist Party)|New World: while Henri Emmanuelli created a new movement, Socialist Alternative, Mélenchon created Trait d'union (TU)|Socialist Party|Trait d'union). At the same time, he founded the association Pour la République sociale (PRS), outside the Socialist Party, with the aim of formulating and promoting a Republican and anti-liberal Left orientation within the French left. PRS advocates for a new political force that takes into account both the failure of what was the Soviet model and the "dead end" of a European social democracy accompanying the "reforms" of neoliberalism.

He argues that the Socialist candidate for the 2007 French presidential election should be someone who supported the "no" vote in the referendum on the European Constitution, because, in his view, this deadline coincides with the European timetable for renegotiating the Constitutional Treaty, which should take effect in 2009. In this spirit, Mélenchon believes Laurent Fabius is the best-placed candidate for the 2007 presidential election.

=== Final Years in the Socialist Party (2005–2008) ===
At the Le Mans congress in November 2005, the Socialist Party's "Trait d'union" (Trait d'union) submitted a contribution. Despite the consensus among its leaders on the European question, the left wing of the Socialist Party was divided. "Trait d'union" joined the motion led by Laurent Fabius and supported by Marie-Noëlle Lienemann, while the other leaders of the left wing rallied behind the motion presented by the New Socialist Party (NPS). The former obtained 21.2% of the vote, the latter 23.6%, while party members re-elected the outgoing majority of François Hollande (53%). In the context of the primary election held a year later within the Socialist Party (PS) to choose between the candidates for the Socialist nomination in the presidential election, Mélenchon again endorsed Laurent Fabius.

In this regard, he declared in August 2005:

There aren't fifty candidates for the 2007 presidential election within the PS; at this point, there are only two left: Laurent Fabius and Dominique Strauss-Kahn. They are two intelligent men, who look good, but they need to be distinguished on something, namely their ideas and commitments. [...] I hope the Socialist Party doesn't make the mistake of fielding a candidate who supported the "yes" vote [in the French referendum on the Treaty establishing a Constitution for Europe, which is the case with Dominique Strauss-Kahn]. By logic, I conclude that Laurent Fabius should be the candidate. [...] Fabius has been a minister; he is capable of leading the country. I will support him, but not with a blank check."

Two days after the Socialist Party's nomination of Ségolène Royal, which he had opposed, he attended a meeting of the anti-liberal left, leaving doubt about its possible support for his candidacy in the presidential election.

After the failure of the unity groups to unite behind a common candidate, he wrote on his blog, affirming his support for Ségolène Royal: "A portion of the politically engaged left-wing electorate is becoming demobilized. They do not feel represented. A segment of the electorate, among those disheartened (by the harshness of life) – disoriented (by the absence of an intelligible radical political alternative), will continue to waver between disgusted indifference and bursts of blind electoral anger. Finally, the centrality of the Socialist candidacy on the left is now absolute, whether one likes it or not, because it seems to be the only effective way to achieve the most basic common program: to be present in the second round and defeat the right." The defeat of the latter in the second round of the presidential election, against the candidate of the Union for a Popular Movement (UMP), Nicolas Sarkozy, led him to criticize the former candidate's strategy very sharply, notably through his book "In Search of the Left".

In September 2008, at the Reims congress, Trait d'union submitted a new contribution. Calling for unity among all the left-wing factions of the Socialist Party, Mélenchon quickly reached an agreement with the Forces Militaires movement led by Marc Dolez, a member of parliament from northern France. The other factions, gathered around the New Socialist Party (2003) of Benoît Hamon and Henri Emmanuelli, hesitated for a long time between this strategy and supporting the motion led by Martine Aubry and Laurent Fabius.

The day before the motions were to be submitted, an agreement was reached between the seven contributions from the left wing of the Socialist Party. Mélenchon was among the signatories of motion C entitled "A world ahead", led by Benoît Hamon. He described this gathering as a historic event: this motion brought together for the first time all the factions of the left wing of the Socialist Party, with emblematic figures of this tendency such as Gérard Filoche, Marie-Noëlle Lienemann, and Paul Quilès.

On November 6, 2008, Socialist Party members voted to decide between the different motions. The motion supported by Ségolène Royal came in first with approximately 29% of the votes cast, while the one led by Benoît Hamon came in fourth with 18.5%. For Mélenchon, this was a victory for the outgoing majority, which won 80% of the votes, and among these votes, some advocate an alliance with the centre. Feeling too far removed from this trend to the point that it was pointless to participate in the congress, Jean-Luc Mélenchon and Marc Dolez announced on November 7 their decision, out of loyalty to their commitments and in the interest of independent action, to leave the Socialist Party (France) and create a new movement uncompromising in its opposition to the right.

They announce the construction of a new left-wing party, simply called the Left Party (on the German model of Die Linke), and call for the formation of a united front of left-wing forces for the European elections. On November 18, during a meeting with the French Communist Party, the two parties announced their alliance in the form of a partnership, within the framework of a Left Front for a different democratic and social Europe, against the ratification of the Treaty of Lisbon and the current European treaties. The launch meeting of the Left Party was held on 29 November 2008 in Saint-Ouen, in the presence of the co-president of Die Linke, Oskar Lafontaine.

=== Departure from the Socialists and foundation of the Left Party (2008–2012) ===
Mélenchon at the Left Front's launching rally in 2009

At the Reims Congress in September 2008, the political current Trait d'union, created after the victory of the "No" in the 2005 French European Constitution referendum, Mélenchon made a new contribution. On the eve of the filing of the motions, an agreement was reached between the seven contributions of the left wing of the PS, and Mélenchon was one of the signatories of Motion C entitled "A world ahead", led by Benoît Hamon. For the first time, this motion brought together all the sensibilities of the left wing of the PS, with emblematic personalities like Gérard Filoche, Marie-Noëlle Lienemann, and Paul Quilès. He described this gathering as a "historic event".

On 6 November 2008, the Socialist militants voted to decide between six motions. The motion supported by Ségolène Royal led with about 29% of the votes cast, while the one led by Benoît Hamon came in fourth with 18.5%. For Mélenchon, this was a victory of the outgoing majority, which carried 80% of the votes (with the first three motions) including the motion advocating the alliance in the centre. Believing themselves too far from this trend to the point that it would not be useful to take part in the congress, Mélenchon, alongside Marc Dolez, announced on 7 November their decision, "out of fidelity to their commitments", and for their independence of action, to leave the PS, and to create a new movement "without concession facing the right".

They announced "the construction of a new left-wing party", simply called the Left Party (on the German model of Die Linke), and called for "the constitution of a left-wing front for the European elections". On 18 November, in a meeting with the PCF, the two parties announced their alliance in the form of a "partnership", within the framework of a "left front for another democratic and social Europe, against the ratification of the Treaty of Lisbon and the current European Treaties". The launch meeting of the Left Party was held on 29 November in Saint-Ouen, in the presence of Die Linke's co-chairman Oskar Lafontaine. Mélenchon became the party president. Until 2014, he was also co-president alongside Martine Billard.

=== First presidential candidacy (2012) ===
A political outsider, Mélenchon was the candidate representing the Left Front (Communist Party of France, Left Party, Unitary Left) in the 2012 French presidential election. He took fourth place and achieved 11.10% of the vote, trailing behind François Hollande, Nicolas Sarkozy, and Marine Le Pen and their respective parties (the PS, the Union for a Popular Movement, and the National Front). In comparison, the winner, Hollande, received 28.63% of the vote. (Note: For the results, see "Elections Législatives – Results". France 24. Archived from the original on 6 May 2012.) It was the first time the non-socialist left had registered a double figure result since Georges Marchais in 1981.

In the 2012 French legislative election, Mélenchon represented the Left Front in the Pas-de-Calais' 11th constituency against his rival Marine Le Pen, where she had over 31% in the presidential election. He received third place with 21.46% of the vote, narrowly edged out for second by Socialist Party member Phillip Kemel. Mélenchon decided not to stand in the second round of the election after this result.

=== Second presidential candidacy (2017) ===
During the presidency of Hollande, Mélenchon became one of the most critical voices in the left against his centrist free-market policy, which he considered a betrayal of the culture and ideas of the French left. During an interview on the French television channel TF1 on 10 February 2016, Melenchon launched the left-wing political platform La France Insoumise, (Note: Both the Ministry of the Interior and the French Council of State, the most important body for French administrative justice, consider La France Insoumise to be left-wing. La France Insoumise is often translated in English as "France in Revolt", "Unsubmissive France", and "Unbowed France".) without any expectation of victory. La France Insoumise was subsequently endorsed by several parties, such as the Left Party and French Communist Party, in addition to members of the Europe Ecology – The Greens like Sergio Coronado, an assembly member for the 2nd Overseas Constituency, and the mayor of Grenoble, Éric Piolle.

According to political scientist Christopher Bickerton, La France Insoumise was comparable to Podemos in Spain, and Le Baron Noir character Michel Vidal is based on Mélenchon. La France Insoumise's broad range meant it ran, in the words of Bickerton, "from the remnants of the PCF's industrial working class votes to the vast majority of the country's Muslim population, as well as urbanised intellectuals and France's many neo-ruralist converts". According to Bickerton, La France Insoumise is "a flexible organisation, in tune with the individualism of the present", with "no membership as such" and much of its activism being "self-financed and self-organised", and where "Mélenchon gives his approval to initiatives after the fact rather than issuing orders or instructions."

On 12 January 2017, Mélenchon secured the 500 elected sponsors required to be validated by the Constitutional Council. After Benoît Hamon won the nomination for the Parti Socialiste on a left-wing platform, beating former Prime Minister, Manuel Valls, 58–41, Hamon announced on TF1 on 27 February that he and Melenchon had been in talks to form an alliance but their stances on the European Union separated them, as Melenchon's platform was to renegotiate EU treaties or hold a referendum. France 24 reported: "Adding their scores would place a candidate in first or second place." Mélenchon, who saw himself as "outside the frame of political parties", held at a consistent 12% for most of the campaign, until a late upwards surge which put him just behind third place François Fillon at 18%.

This late surge was mainly due to Mélenchon's performance within the second presidential debate hosted by BFM TV and CNews, where, according to an Elabe poll, he was found the most convincing candidate by 25%. He did not qualify for the second round of voting, winning 19.6% of the vote in the first round, placing fourth. With seven million votes, La France Insoumise had achieved the biggest vote in France for the radical left since 1945. It achieved 24% among blue-collar voters, 22% among low-paid white-collar voters, and 30% among 18–24 year-olds.

After the first round, Mélenchon refused to endorse Macron and told his voters that "no vote should go to the National Front", as he had done in 2002. Following constant criticism for this choice, Mélenchon invited members of La France Insoumise to vote on who he will endorse with the choices being "Vote for Emmanuel Macron", "Blank Vote", or "Abstain", with the result being announced on 2 May. 36.12% submitted a blank vote, 34.83% chose to endorse Macron, and 29.05% abstained.

His campaign positions included the intent to establish a Sixth Republic and preserve the environment. According to the NGOs for the development aid Action Against Hunger, Action santé mondiale, CARE France, and ONE Campaign, Mélenchon was the candidate in the presidential election who is the most engaged regarding international solidarity. Together with other French intellectuals, he vigorously denounces free trade between France and the United States as an example of global exploitation.

=== Member of the National Assembly (2017–2022) ===
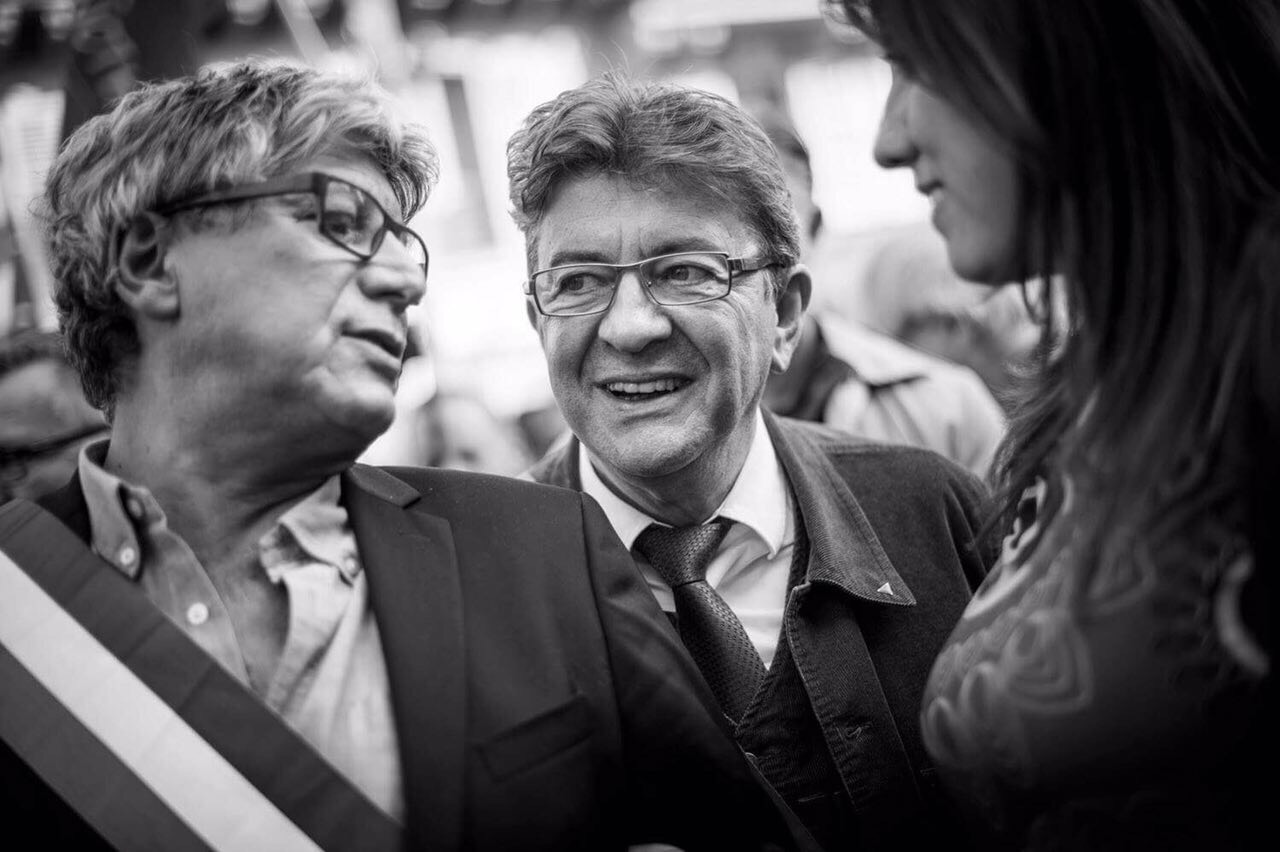
Mélenchon with fellow parliamentarian Éric Coquerel in 2017

In June 2017, Mélenchon became a member of the National Assembly for La France Insoumise following his win in the legislative election in the 4th constituency of Bouches-du-Rhône, which covers parts of the centre of Marseille. He won 59.9% of the vote in the second round against En Marche! candidate Corrine Versini. He defeated sitting member Patrick Mennucci in the first round, a notable member of the Socialist Party in Marseille. (Note: For the results, see "Élections législatives de 2017". Ministère de l'Intérieur et des Outre-mer (in French). Archived from the original on 19 June 2017.) The collapse of the Socialist Party meant that La France Insoumise had become the de facto opposition to Emmanuel Macron in the National Assembly.

His election to the National Assembly drew national media attention. During the examination of the 2017 Labour Law bill, he was remarked in the National Assembly for his multiple interventions, defending the Labour Code status quo along with fellow La France Insoumise members, arguing that flexibilisation would be harmful to workers. He drew attention from the media once more when he came in Parliament with a five-euros food shopping bag to denounce a student benefits cut planned by the government. In December 2019, Mélenchon received a suspended prison sentence of three months for rebellion and provocation following an altercation with police officers who had come to serve a warrant at the La France Insoumise headquarters in Paris.

=== Third presidential candidacy and NUPES (2022–2023) ===
A map of the first round of the 2022 French presidential election. Mélenchon was the most voted candidate in the red departments and territories

Mélenchon was again a candidate in the 2022 French presidential election. He was one of three candidates placed without their consent on the ballot for the 2022 French People's Primary, a non-official vote for a common left-wing candidate; he came third out of seven, behind Christiane Taubira and Yannick Jadot. Taubira withdrew in March, and endorsed Mélenchon. Mélenchon's polling numbers surged in the final weeks of campaigning, putting him within chance of making the second round. In 2017, 21.4% had been enough to gain access to the second round.

For the first round of the 2022 presidential election, Mélenchon's strategy was to unite the other left-wing anti-neoliberal parties against Emmanuel Macron, who attempted to play down his neoliberalism in the second round in order to appeal to Mélenchon voters while presenting Marine Le Pen as a dangerous nationalist. This dynamic flipped in the 2022 French legislative election as Mélenchon and La France Insoumise had become part of the New Ecological and Social People's Union (NUPES), a broad anti-neoliberal coalition. (Note: About NUPES, political scientist Christopher Bickerton stated that "it would be a mistake to see La France Insoumise as a 21st century reincarnation of the PCF; the ideological and organisational differences are too stark. It would also be wrong to think of NUPES as a present-day version of the 1972 Common Programme, which briefly united the communists and socialists around an agreed set of policies. NUPES is not another step in the long march of the French Left; it is the expression of a much wider unravelling of French politics, which has been playing out on the Right and the Left for the last 30 years.")

Macron denounced Mélenchon and the anti-neoliberal NUPES coalition as delusional anti-capitalists. Mélenchon urged his supporters "not to give a single vote to Mrs Le Pen". According to political scientist Christopher Bickerton, observers commented that "the LFI's electoral offer was the most sophisticated of all the parties – a total of 694 proposals, from a sixth republic to 'rational' anti-terrorist legislation, to a commitment to the demilitarisation of space."

In the first round of voting in France's two round voting system, Mélenchon came in third place with 22% of the vote, behind Macron (28%) and Le Pen (23%). Only the top two finishers continue on to the second round, so Mélenchon was eliminated after the results of the first round were certified. (Note: For the results, see "Election présidentielle 2022". Ministère de l'Intérieur et des Outre-mer (in French). Archived from the original on 10 April 2022.) Mélenchon advised his voters not to vote for Le Pen in the second round but did not endorse Macron. His 7.7 million first-round voters became a key demographic for the second round. He was the most popular candidate for voters aged 24–35, and in the overseas departments of Martinique, Guadeloupe, French Guiana, Réunion, Saint Pierre and Miquelon, and Saint Martin, obtaining majorities in several of these jurisdictions. He also finished first in Île-de-France. Mélenchon did not run for re-election in Bouches-du-Rhône's 4th constituency, instead giving his candidacy to Manuel Bompard. Mélenchon led the NUPES coalition since May 2022. In the 2022 legislative election, NUPES won 131 seats. Amid divisions, NUPES dissolved in 2023.

=== Fourth presidential candidacy ===
On 3 May 2026, Mélenchon officially announced his candidacy for the 2027 French presidential election during the TF1 evening news broadcast. Libération reported: "The founder of La France Insoumise hopes to reach the runoff round for the first time, having finished fourth in 2017 (19.58% of the vote) and third in 2022 (21.95%)." He said during the broadcast, "The context and the urgency of the situation drove the movement's decision." He said that he thinks he is the "best prepared" within his party and that the "main adversary" is the Rassemblement National.

He held his first campaign rally on 7 June 2026 in Seine-Saint-Denis.

In October 2026, he declared: "We are not living in ordinary times; otherwise, there would be no "Insoumis" senators".

== Political positions ==
Mélenchon is a socialist republican, inspired primarily by the founder of French republican socialism, Jean Jaurès. During his political career, Mélenchon crossed various tendencies of the French left, from Trotskyism in his youth to more moderate socialism, as he was in the Socialist Party for almost thirty years, occupying a place on the left wing of the party, before he began a companionship with the French Communist Party, after his departure from the Socialist Party in 2008. He rejects the labels of "radical left" or "far-left" that the press has often ascribed to his political positions.

According to historian Jean-Numa Ducange, Mélenchon became for many the main representative of the historical French left during the 2017 presidential election, scoring 20%, far ahead of the Socialist Party candidate Benoît Hamon, and was not a radical leftist, having unconditionally supported the Plural Left that was in power between 1997 and 2002, and having himself been a minister in this government between 2000 and 2002. According to historian Roger Martelli, Mélenchon's long Socialist Party past contradicts the restricted image of "left of the left", and gives him a "traditional anchoring".

Historian Sudhir Hazareesingh described Mélenchon as a "democratic socialist candidate [who] symbolises France's hunger for social, political, and environmental reform, as well as the popular frustration with the nation's established elites", and as "a middle-class champion of the working people, a former senator turned radical reformer, a transformative visionary driven by memories of past glories, a digital geek steeped in classical learning, an inveterate critic of presidentialism who is himself a charismatic leader, and a 70-year-old veteran who counts the young among his primary constituencies".

According to sociologist Paolo Gerbaudo, Mélenchon supports social-democratic and reformist socialist policies, having softened his "revolutionary and radical image". During the 2022 presidential campaign, Mélenchon shifted towards a more pragmatic approach, instead of a philosophical and theoretical one, while campaigning in favour of bread-and-butter issues. According to political scientist Christopher Bickerton, among the reasons for "Mélenchon's high score in the 2022 presidential election was that he supplemented his earlier populism with an extensive and comprehensive legislative programme".

According to the Belgian public media RTBF, his radical appearance is linked to his criticism of neoliberalism, international treaties, and the functioning of the European Union (EU), as well as his tax reform. Mélenchon does not support Marxist ideas of "proletarian revolution", as is the case with the New Anticapitalist Party and Lutte Ouvrière, and his tax reform is more moderate than that of the far-left. On the political spectrum, Mélenchon is placed on the political left, including by international news outlets like CNN, The Daily Telegraph, Der Spiegel, Deutsche Welle, NBC News, The New Yorker, Politico, The Scotsman, The Spectator, and The Times; he is often also classified as far-left, or left-wing populist, by Anglo-Saxon news outlets (the Associated Press, BBC News, Bloomberg News, The Conversation, the Financial Times, The Independent, Reuters, Time, and The Washington Post), and by the French media whose audience is international (Euronews, France 24, and Radio France Internationale). He is described as a "firebrand leader of the left".

Mélenchon is a proponent of increased labour rights and the expansion of French welfare programmes. He has also called for the mass redistribution of wealth, to rectify existing socioeconomic inequalities. Domestic policies proposed by Mélenchon include a 100% income tax on earnings over €360,000 a year, 100% inheritance tax on sums beyond €12 million, full state reimbursement for health care costs, a reduction in presidential powers, in favour of the legislature, and the easing of immigration laws. Mélenchon supports same-sex marriage and women's right to abortion. He also favours the legalisation of cannabis, but opposes prostitution and supported the ban on the purchase of sex, which came into effect in 2016.

Mélenchon believes in the "créolisation" of French culture and society, a term coined by the Martinican poet Édouard Glissant, who defines it as "a blend of cultures that creates something new", that "belongs to none of the cultures that comprise it". During a campaign rally in December 2021, Mélenchon told his supporters: "Whatever one's gender, colour, or religion, we are called upon to love one another, and so we pool together our tastes and our cultures. That's créolisation. Créolisation is the future of humanity."

Hazareesingh argued that Mélenchon "mobilised support in deprived inner-city areas, and was the only major candidate who unambiguously denounced racism and Islamophobia, and defended a multicultural vision of Frenchness which, borrowing from the poet Édouard Glissant, he labelled 'créolisation'". During a rally on 14 June 2024, Melenchon stated, "When I was born, one in ten French people had a foreign grandparent, now it's one in four. Consequently, those who call themselves French by origin pose a serious problem for the cohesion of society."

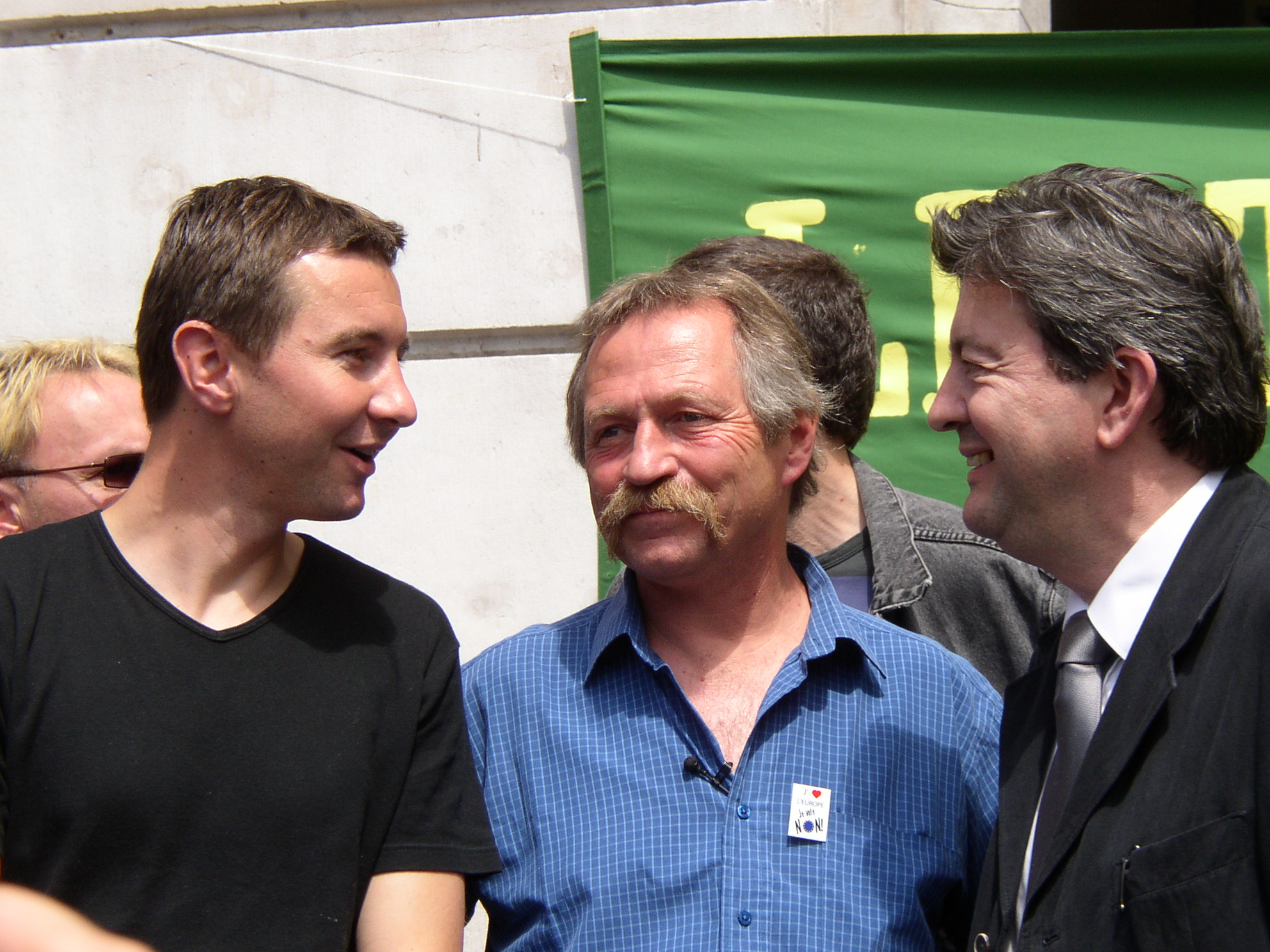
Mélenchon (right) with Olivier Besancenot (left) and José Bové (centre) at a meeting to rally support for the "No" vote in the 2005 French European Constitution referendum

Mélenchon is an outspoken critic of the EU, which he views as having been corrupted through neoliberalism. During his 2012 campaign, Mélenchon positioned himself against the trend towards economic globalisation, which he denounced as disproportionately profiting the financial industry and "high income earners", at the expense of the poor. He insisted that international organisations such as the EU threatened to "strangle the voice of the people". He supports a renegotiation of European treaties. Mélenchon opposes the North Atlantic Treaty Organization (NATO), which he perceives as an affront to France's national sovereignty. He has repeatedly called for France to withdraw from NATO. Mélenchon has voiced his support for Rattachism.

Mélenchon has been labelled a populist by numerous diverse people, (Note: According to political scientist Philippe Marlière, Mélenchon could be described as a populist leader as early as 2010, when he declared himself to be one. In the 2010 interview, Mélenchon stated: "I don't want to defend myself anymore against the accusation of populism. People are disgusted by the elites. Do they deserve anything better? They should all quit! I'm calling upon the energy of the many against the arrogance of the privileged classes. Am I a populist? Yes I am!" Of populism, Marlière summarised: "From Napoleon III to Charles de Gaulle, in recent times, populism has characterised right-wing or extreme-right regimes or leaderships. It has helped label demagogic policies and the art of exploiting people's fears and frustration. Given the near-exclusive association of populism with the far-right, the diagnosis of populism often extends to 'demonisation'. Conversely, the left in France has always supported collegial forms of leadership and put the emphasis on collective endeavours. For communists and socialists, populism neglects class struggles because it focusses on an undefined 'people'. Consequently, 'populism' and 'left' are arguably incompatible notions because a proper populist strategy can only appeal to far-right voters.") with the Socialist Party senator Luc Carvounas saying he goes to "the summits of demagoguery and populism", and the magazine Slate stating that Mélenchon's rhetoric is "shocking" and implying his entire political life is based around pleasing the people. He has been compared to Le Pen in terms of debating style; political scientist Dominique Reynié even went as far as to say he "flirts with xenophobia when it helps him". According to Bickerton, "LFI's starting point is not Marxist dialectics or class conflict, but le peuple".

Political scientist Chloe Morin described Mélenchon as "the principal asset of La France Insoumise. He is also their principal handicap. He is a great orator, a matchless tactician, but also a deeply divisive figure." Mélenchon has himself his vision of populism, which he sees as positive if it comes with left-wing politics, and believes it is possible to bring about a "citizens' revolution", to usher in "the epoch of the people".

He is inspired by the philosopher Chantal Mouffe, who sought to theorise and rehabilitate the term "left populism". This theory argues that neoliberalism and austerity only made the far-right stronger, and that the populist concept of "the people" has to be reintroduced into the political sphere in a civic sense, rather than an ethnic way (creating a "right populism" to fight). (Note: In the run-up to the 2017 French presidential election, Mélenchon launched a populist strategy, in what Marlière described it as "a radical break with the collective forms of leadership and action on the French left", and added: "In true populist fashion, the FI leader wants to federate 'the people', and not simply left-wing voters. He has ceased to use the notion of left altogether." According to Marlière, populism is not part of the French left, which historically rejected populist movements, ideas, and leaders, citing as "a clear refutation of leader-centric populism" the original version of "The Internationale", where Eugène Pottier wrote: "There are no supreme saviours, neither God, nor Caesar, nor eloquent speakers, producers, let's save ourselves." In the words of Marlière, that of Mélenchon was "an attempt to organise the masses along the lines of an agonistic cleavage between 'the people' and 'the elite', and this was also a radical break with the collective forms of leadership and action on the French left. The gamble paid off as Mélenchon received significant support from segments of left-wing voters in the first round of the presidential election." According to Marlière, "Mélenchon's style, strategy and politics have energised fragments of the left-wing electorate (the young and working-class voters notably) but they have also created tensions with other parties of the left. Those organisations fear that Mélenchon's 'populist moment' may be detrimental to the future of left-wing politics in France altogether." In regards to the types of populism, Marlière wrote: "What defines FI's populism is the role and the centrality of the leader. One may wonder whether populism is the best strategy to broaden the left's electorate as left-wing and right-wing populisms do not tap in the same culture and do not express the same feelings. On the left, the anger is directed at free market economics. On the far right, the hatred of foreigners and immigrants is the main motivation. Both feelings and mindsets are incompatible: the former has a positive mindset whereas the latter is based on resentment.")

=== Sixth Republic and French Constitution ===
Mélenchon advocates for the holding of a constitutional convention to create a Sixth French Republic. In the 2017 party manifesto titled L'Avenir en commun, it states in the first chapter: "The new constitution that France needs must be radically different." (Note: (introductory section of chapter 1 of the 2017 party manifesto of Jean-Luc Mélenchon: "The democratic urgency, The Sixth Republic". Translated from the French by Wikipedia) "Everything starts with the power of the citizens. How can we turn over the power to the people, while finishing the system of the mediatic-political caste and the presidential monarchy? The era of the people must begin! The civilian revolution that I believe in is the peaceful and democratic means for turning the page of the tyranny of the financial oligarchy and the caste at its service. It will be the task of a constituent assembly, convoked for changing the constitution from top to toe, abolishing the presidential monarchy and restoring the power of the people's initiative. I would like to be the last President of the Fifth Republic and abdicate my powers as soon as the new constitution will be adopted by the French people. The Sixth Republic will commence and it will be a refoundation of France itself.") On 14 September 2014, Mélenchon wrote in Le Monde that "France must protect itself from the powers of finance. They devour the real economy. ... To this end, the definition of the constitutional rights of private ownership of capital should change. ... Again, it is inclusion in the Constitution that will fix this and make it a common rule."

Mélenchon is endorsed by the Movement for the 6th Republic, and has spoken positively of them before. A spokesman for La France Insoumise affirmed that Mélenchon was very welcoming of a Sixth Republic run by the people that welcomes democracy, ecology, and challenges social issues. The constitutional convention members must not have ever been elected representatives, and they would not be able to present themselves thereafter.

=== Police brutality ===
On Wednesday, 15 July 2020, when asked on TV channel BFM-RTL whether the police should stand back in the face of violent protest, Mélenchon answered that they needed to "stay put like Jesus on the cross without reacting."

=== Agriculture ===
The association L214, which is a non-profit for animal protection, stated that he was the only candidate "for animals" during its evaluation of the candidates' programmes, giving him a score of 15.7/20, placing him at the head of 11 candidates.

=== European Parliament ===
Mélenchon's attendance before the 2012 presidential election was at 63%, and after this, his average is often compiled with pre-2012, so it is compiled at 71.40%. Mélenchon justified his relatively low attendance with how active he is within France itself, and has posted a list of other reasons on his blog. He increased his attendance after that, with the website votewatch.eu reporting it in 2017 at 85.1%.

=== Foreign policy ===
==== China ====
In line with France's one China policy, Mélenchon considers Taiwan to be a part of China. In 2026, he stated regarding Taiwan that "There is a problem, and it is up to the Chinese to resolve it. We must intervene politely and respectfully, so that it is done calmly. If they intervene, we will not get involved. If I am President of the Republic, we will never go to war with China". He added "we mustn't have a colonial relationship with China. We're no longer in the 19th century. We must come to an understanding with them".

==== Germany ====
Mélenchon is critical of German economic policies. In 2013, he said: "Nobody wants to be German. They are poorer, they die earlier, they don't have children. Even their migrants are fleeing, because no one wants to live with them." After writing a pamphlet against German policies in May 2015, Mélenchon declared: "But I'm not being anti-German. My aim is to rid my readers of any fascination with the so-called 'German model'. What a 'model', indeed! It is a mockery, a fake paradise, whose population suffers from increasing impoverishment and social violence. The fantasy of the 'German model' is the opium of the rich!"

After the German Chancellor Angela Merkel described reform efforts so far in France and Italy as "insufficient" in December 2014, Mélenchon replied through Twitter in German and French: "Maul zu, Frau #Merkel ! Frankreich ist frei. Occupez-vous de vos pauvres et de vos équipements en ruines !" ("Shut your mouth, Mrs. Merkel! France is free. Take care of your poor and your ruined equipment.") In reaction to the 2015 Greek bailout referendum on the Greek sovereign debt crisis in early July 2015, he said that the "right-wing German government" was primarily responsible for the aggravation of the crisis.

==== Ukraine ====
In 2014 Mélenchon considered the 2014 Russian annexation of Crimea to be "absolutely predictable", stating that "Crimean ports [were considered by Russia as] vital for Russia's security", and that Russia was taking "protective measures against an adventurous putschist power", also alleging that Ukraine was influenced by neo-Nazis. He further opposed imposing sanctions on Russia, and as a member of the European Parliament, voted against all forms of cooperation with Ukraine, including on science.

In 2015, Mélenchon referred to Ukraine as a country "struggling to be one". During the 2021–2022 Russo-Ukrainian crisis, he said that Russia "...must not cross Ukraine's borders", while stating that the United States should not "annex Ukraine into NATO". This was criticized as making "obfuscations and excuses for Russia", as there is no such thing as annexation into NATO. He blamed the cause of the conflict between 2014 and 2022 on what he termed as NATO "pushing ever closer to [Russia's] borders".

Nonetheless, Mélenchon denounced the 2022 Russian invasion of Ukraine, describing it as an "unbearable escalation" and calling for the use of "diplomatic" means to obtain "an immediate ceasefire and the withdrawal of all foreign troops from Ukraine". After initially opposing arms deliveries to Ukraine, Mélenchon endorsed arms deliveries in June 2022 with the justification that "Ukraine has the right and the duty to defend itself", but opposed further French involvement.

==== Russia ====
Mélenchon mocked accusations of support for Putin, saying that it is unlikely that an eco-socialist would support Putin, and when attacked by Benoît Hamon on the topic of Putin, he stated: "I am not bound in any way to Mr. Putin. I am absolutely fighting his policy, and if I were Russian, I would not vote for his party, but for the Russian Left Front whose leader is in prison." Mélenchon declared opposition to Putin's domestic policy and notes his friend of the Russian Left Front, Sergey Udaltsov, is imprisoned in Russia.

In February 2022, Mélenchon condemned the Russian invasion of Ukraine. After Sergey Udaltsov expressed support for the invasion of Ukraine, Mélenchon cut his political ties with him and condemned his stance. In October 2022 he hosted three Russian opponents to Putin, Alexey Sakhnin, Andreï Roudoï and Elizabeta Smirnova, members of the "coalition of Russian socialists against the war".

Jean-Luc Mélenchon has been regularly described by political critics as friendly to Russia, an accusation he denies. According to French public radio channel France Inter, his position has varied, from downplaying the threat in 2014 to outright condemnation after the 2022 invasion of Ukraine.

In 2015, opposition leader Boris Nemtsov, an outspoken critic of Vladimir Putin, was killed next to the Kremlin. In response, the EU Parliament voted a motion denouncing the human rights situation in Russia. Mélenchon was one of the only members of the European Parliament to vote against the motion. He called it propaganda.

In January 2022, a few weeks before the 2022 Russian invasion of Ukraine, he told Le Monde:

"The Russians are moving troops toward their borders? Who would not do the same thing with such a neighbor?"

As soon as the invasion of Ukraine happened, Jean-Luc Mélenchon condemned it as an unlawful act of aggression on behalf of Russia. This criticism was criticised as opportunistic by Mélenchon's opponents.

A few days after the invasion began, Jean-Luc Mélenchon said France should not provide any military aid to Ukraine. He later changed his mind and endorsed providing military aid, justifying it as Ukraine's right to defend itself. This change of policy was criticised by Mélenchon's opponents.

In October 2022, the French Parliament introduced a motion denouncing Russia's war against Ukraine. Most French political parties supported the motion. Two exceptions were the Rassemblement National and Mélenchon's France Insoumise. They both abstained. LFI maintains that "Russia is guilty of waging a war of aggression against Ukraine, in the course of which it has violated almost every taboo of international law". However, it criticises "an entirely maximalist approach to arms deliveries, which bears no relation to what France is doing or can do", and regrets that the resolution "barely addresses the very idea of peace".

In May 2025, Sophia Chikirou, a French deputy member of LFI, attended a rally celebrating the Allied victory over Nazism. Several news outlets accused this event of being pro-Russian. However, Sophia Chikirou denied having taken part in this gathering, a claim subsequently confirmed by the press.

In August 2025, Jean-Luc Mélenchon created controversy after calling Volodymyr Zelenskyy an illegitimate leader due to the delay of the planned 2024 Ukrainian presidential election. At the same time he was criticised for arguing Vladimir Putin was only a threat to Ukraine and should not be considered a threat for Western Europe.

Some commentators claimed Mélenchon "supported Russia" and was sympathetic towards Vladimir Putin. Notably, the journalist Nicolas Hénin said that Mélenchon is "on the left of the political spectrum, but is an advocate for the Kremlin leader", with Hénin quoting how Mélenchon is the "political victim number one" after the murder of the Russian opposition leader Boris Nemtsov. Cécile Vaissié, author of The Kremlin Networks, considers Mélenchon as "one of those that approve of Putin", and Yannick Jadot of EELV said that the "pro-Russia" stance is "contrary to any environment thinking".

==== Syria ====
Mélenchon favoured a United Nations-led intervention in Syria featuring all nations on the UN Security Council. He opposes intervention without international cooperation. After the chemical attack in Ghouta, he said that a strike on Syria "would be an enormous mistake" leading to escalation and called instead for a "political solution".

Mélenchon has compared an intervention in Syria to Iraq, and has approved of Russia's intervention in Syria, saying that he believes Vladimir Putin will resolve the ISIS problem in Syria, noting "It was the Russians who cut off the lines of supply that Daesh used to smuggle oil to Turkey". He said many times that he believed Putin could not be left to solve the problem in Syria alone, saying: "The UN will solve the problem ... it's time for an international coalition".

In response to the 2019 Turkish offensive into north-eastern Syria against the Kurdish-led Syrian Democratic Forces, Melenchon tweeted: "If Turkish footballers do the military salute, they must expect to be treated as the soldiers of an enemy army. So we do not play football against them. The basics of sportsmanship are no longer there!"

==== Saudi Arabia ====
During a European Parliament session on 8 June 2016 concerning Venezuela, Mélenchon criticised what he called European hypocrisy, comparing European tolerance of Saudi Arabian rule and intolerance of Venezuelan rule.

In June 2016, Mélenchon criticized the Saudi-led intervention in the Yemeni civil war and the Macron government's support for the war effort of Saudi Arabia and the United Arab Emirates, which contributed to the humanitarian crisis in Yemen.

==== Venezuela ====
In 2018, Mélenchon described the countries that denounced the 2018 Venezuelan presidential election as "puppets of the United States". He said that the date of the election was agreed upon with the approval of former Spanish Prime Minister José Luis Rodríguez Zapatero and that some of the opposition had decided to boycott it.

==== Iran ====
Following the 2020 Baghdad International Airport airstrike that resulted in the killing of major general Qasem Soleimani, Mélenchon tweeted: "We must equally condemn the USA and Iran as warmongers. My condemnation of the USA does not exempt Iran from the fact that it is a theocracy that wants to destroy the State of Israel." On French news channel LCI, he declared: "the current government of Iran claims it wants to destroy the State of Israel. This is an intolerable project which in itself creates incredible tension in the region, and obviously favors extremes on either side."

==== Israel and Palestine ====
Mélenchon is a strong supporter of Palestinian statehood, and is a harsh critic of Israel, which he regards as a colonial state. After Jeremy Corbyn and the Labour Party lost the 2019 United Kingdom general election, he claimed that the election results were influenced by the Israeli Likud Party.

In 2024, Mélenchon condemned Israel's military operations in the Gaza Strip as "genocide", and supported South Africa's genocide case against Israel.

On 4 October 2024, three days before the one-year anniversary of the 7 October Hamas attack on Israel, Melenchon called for "putting Palestinian flags everywhere" in universities after 7 October, in response to Patrick Hetzel calling for a "maintenance of order" on university grounds.

In November 2026, after Israel banned Mélenchon and several members of the La France Insoumise party from entering Israel, Mélenchon said that, if his party came to power, he would denounce the "genocide in Gaza", the construction of settlements in the West Bank, and the gradual annexation of southern Lebanon and the Golan Heights.

=== Defence ===
In 2017, Mélenchon called for French withdrawal from the integrated command of NATO, and in 2022 advocated for France assuring its own defence.

=== Regionalism ===
Mélenchon comes from a left-wing tradition that emphasises the unity of the French Republic and is suspicious of regionalism. Nevertheless, Mélenchon has no fixed position on regionalism, but has stated that he supports the teaching of regional languages, especially Breton. He supports state funding for the teaching of the Breton language. He has gone against autonomy for Brittany, even criticising socialists from the region for promoting "autonomy".

In 2018, Mélenchon was asked a question about an anti-corruption investigation by a journalist from Toulouse, Véronique Gaurel. He responded by mocking her accent, accusing her of "talking nonsense" and then asking "has anyone got a question in more or less comprehensible French?". Video of the exchange was circulated widely on social media and sparked a debate about whether discrimination based on regional accents should be made illegal. Mélenchon apologised for his comment, claiming he thought the journalist was mocking him.

== Controversies ==
=== Hostility toward journalists ===
Mélenchon has been repeatedly criticized by Reporters Without Borders for his extreme hostility toward journalists and news organizations.

In 2009, he told journalist Arlette Chabot, "You should go to hell", and added: "She acts like a monkey".

In 2010, he called TV presenter David Pujadas "a bastard".

In May 2012, he called Renaud Revel of L'Express a "dirty little spy", and called the magazine "fascist".

In April 2012, Hugh Schofield, correspondent for the BBC, said he had been insulted by Mélenchon.

In 2018, investigative journalists working for France Info revealed irregularities in his campaign finance accounts. In response, Mélenchon called them "scum", and urged all his supporters to harass France Info journalists. The same year, he called the newspaper Mediapart the corrupt "instrument of the police and the courts".

On 9 December 2019, Mélenchon was convicted of intimidation of officials who had carried out raids in relation to an investigation into LFI's use of European Parliament funds and another investigation into the funding of his 2017 presidential campaign. He was given a €8,000 fine and suspended sentence of three months in prison.

On 24 September 2021, a court found him guilty of public defamation after calling a Le Monde journalist a former assassin.

In 2024, he told reporters working for popular TV show Quotidien: "Go, you fascists, get lost!"

In 2025, two journalists published La Meute, a book about the rise of his movement. Mélenchon called them "degenerates". The publisher Flammarion denounced threats against the authors.

=== Accusations of antisemitism ===
In 2013, Mélenchon referred to French Finance Minister Pierre Moscovici as "one of those Eurogroup bastards [finance ministers]" putting pressure on Cyprus as it urgently sought a bail-out solution to its debt crisis. Moscovici behaves like someone who has stopped thinking in French. Someone who thinks only in the language of international finance". Harlem Désir stated that "Mélenchon should immediately withdraw these unacceptable comments that he made using the vocabulary of the 1930s". Mélenchon responded that he "had no idea of Pierre Moscovici's religion and [had] no intention of making an issue of it in the future".

In August 2014, during a speech in Grenoble, Mélenchon criticised the Representative Council of Jews of France (CRIF), a coalition of organisations representing French Jewry reputed to be pro-Israeli, saying "We've had enough of CRIF. France is the opposite of aggressive communities that lecture to the rest of country." He also stated "We do not believe that any people is superior to another", which was viewed by his critics as an allusion to the Torah's designation of Jews as the "chosen people". Cnaan Liphshiz said that Mélenchon's comments came in the wake of a series of protests in France against Israel's 2014 Gaza War. While antisemitic attacks had also been reported in France within the previous month, Liphshiz wrote that Mélenchon was referring instead to French Jews "rally[ing] in front of the embassy of a foreign country or serv[ing] its flag, weapon in hand."

In July 2017, Mélenchon maintained that Republican France bears no guilt in the Holocaust, and criticised Emmanuel Macron for admitting at a gathering in Paris remembering the Vel' d'Hiv Roundup that Vichy France was the legal French government at the time, thus conceding the French State's responsibility in the deportation of the Jews. Mélenchon's comments were echoing those of François Mitterrand, a former president, who declared in 1994 that the round-up and deportation of Jews to death camps during the war was the work of the country's Nazi occupiers and "Vichy France", an illegitimate entity distinct from France. Haaretz wrote that Marine Le Pen had made comments similar to Mélenchon's three months earlier.

Following the murder in March 2018 in Paris of Mireille Knoll, an elderly Jewish woman who survived the events at Vel d'Hiv and the Holocaust, CRIF leadership requested Mélenchon stay away from a march in her memory; Mireille's son, Daniel, said that "everyone without exception" could attend, and that, "CRIF is being political, I'm opening my heart to all those who have a mother". As with Marine Le Pen, who made the same choice to be present, despite the appeal, he was booed and abused by a group of angry protesters. In November 2019, Mélenchon further accused CRIF of practising "blatant, violent, and aggressive sectarianism, namely against me", after it asked him not to attend the memorial ceremony for Knoll more than 18 months earlier. No physical violence occurred at the march; police accompanied Mélenchon and his team away from the proceedings.

In December 2019, Mélenchon deplored that Labour Party leader Jeremy Corbyn gave in to the accusations of antisemitism in his party, saying Corbyn "had to endure, unaided, churlish anti-Semitism claims from England's chief rabbi and various influence networks linked to Likud. Instead of riposting, he spent his time apologising and making pledges ... It showed a weakness that troubled the popular sectors [of the electorate]."

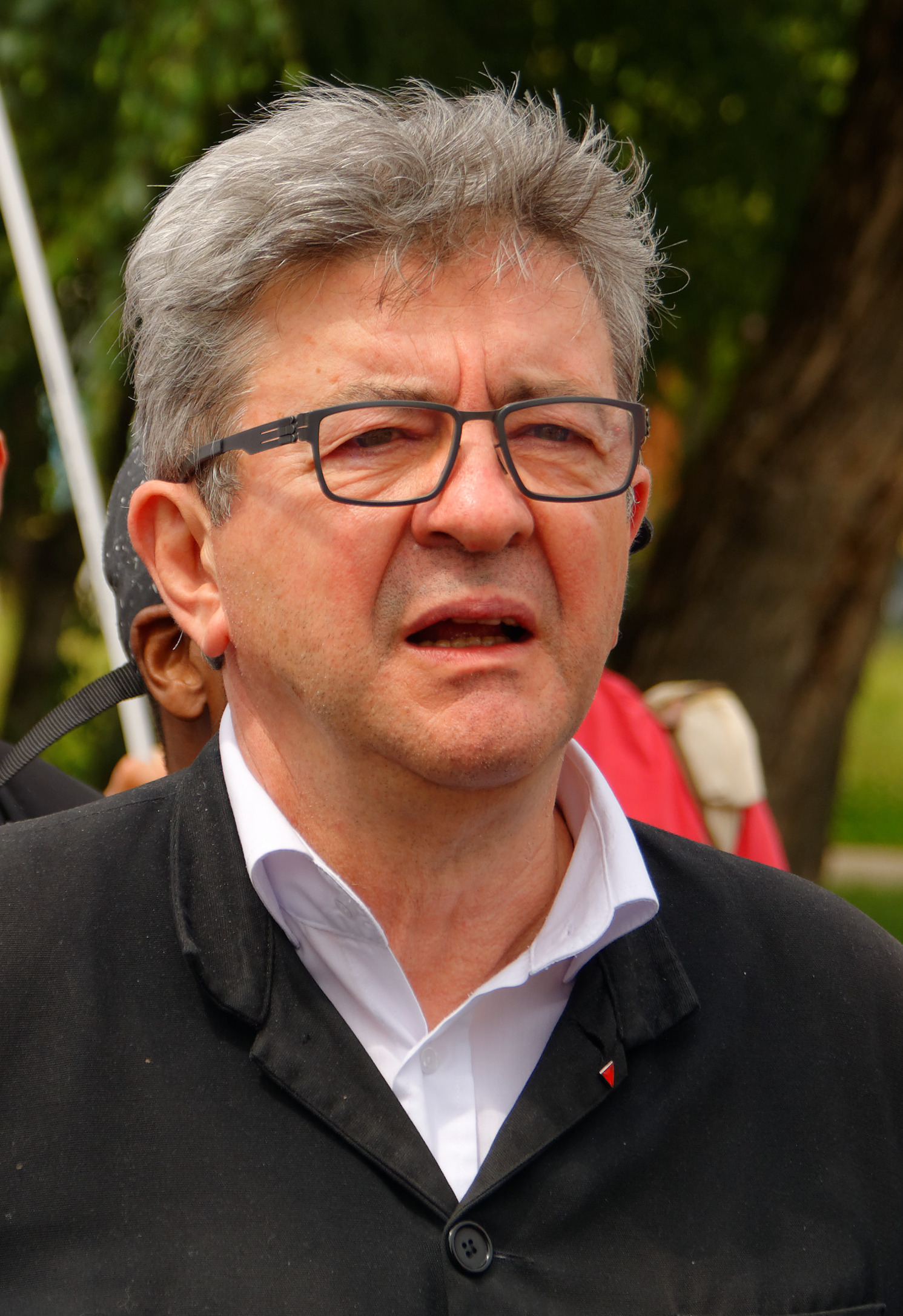
Mélenchon in 2019

On Wednesday, 15 July 2020, in an interview about police competences, Mélenchon said

"I don't know if Jesus was on a cross, but if he was, he was put there by his own compatriots."

The website of the Catholic Church in France corrected Mélenchon: according to the gospels, the Jews, under Roman occupation, had no right to condemn anyone to death, only the Roman governor could take that decision. This old thesis of the Jewish people's responsibility for Jesus' death has since decades been rejected by all Christian churches and all historians, but has given birth to a mortal Anti-Judaism and an antisemitism leading to the Shoah, the Church's website continued, deploring how sad it is that the leader of an important French political party seems so ignorant as to repeat such accusations. The Wiesenthal Center said that "the repeated accusation of" Jewish "deicide – throughout the Middle Ages – resulted in pogroms, torture and execution of Jewish communities. Its imagery fueled violence across Europe, culminating in the Nazi Holocaust", and noted that these accusations were condemned by the Second Vatican Council's declaration Nostra Aetate (1965).

In October 2021, Mélenchon said that far-right leader Éric Zemmour's opposition to immigration was rooted in Jewish culture. The French organisation International League Against Racism and Anti-Semitism condemned these remarks as "the worst antisemitic clichés", Member of Parliament and former Minister Christophe Castaner called them antisemitism.

In early June 2024, Mélenchon wrote in a blog post that antisemitism was "residual" and "absent" from pro-Palestinian demonstrations. French politician Éric Dupond-Moretti disagreed with this characterisation.

=== Word play, deforming names ===
On 26 February 2026, in the midst of his fulminating against the treatment that certain media give him, which he considers unjust, Mélenchon said in French to his audience at an election rally in Lyon: "If the issue is the Epstein ([ɛpstɛn]) affair – oh!, I wanted to say 'Epsteen' ([ɛpstiːn]), sorry, 'Epsteen' would sound more Russian, I think you would now like to say '[aɪnstiːn]' instead of '[aɪnstɛn]' [= referring to Einstein], 'Franken-[stiːn]' instead of 'Franken-[stɛn]' (...) ". (Note: News medium 20 minutes (France) has assessed on 4 February 2026 that French, British and American television professionals are unanimous: the name of billionaire pedocriminal Jeffrey Epstein should be pronounced as « Ép-Stine » ([ˈɛpstiːn]), 'Stine' like in the French first name 'Justine'. This they consider "correct". But if you (Frenchman) say (in English phonetics) « Apuhsteeneh » or « Epshtine » (like in Einstein), and your interlocutor understands you, this is acceptable also, they say.) Politicians of all French political parties were eager to react, all lashing out at Mélenchon. Éric Lombard (independent politician, former Minister of Commerce 2024–25), said on RTL (television or radio) on Friday, 27 February: "These are clearly antisemitic codes. He is antisemite. The answer to Jean-Luc Mélenchon should be given in the ballot box, through political confrontation about ideas". The first secretary of the French Socialist Party, Olivier Faure, wrote on X (social network): "Antifascist is he who combats fascism, not he who reuses the most dangerous motives". Mélenchon that Friday explained, defended and minimized his speech, saying he was simply ironizing on the question.

On 1 March, 2026, Mélenchon in a public speech distorted the name of politician and competitor for the Presidential elections, Raphaël Glucksmann – whose name correctly should be pronounced as [glyksman] – into "Glucksman" pronounced as [glyksmɒ̃]. (Note: French makes a difference between the nasal sound /ɑ̃/ (typically spelled -an) like the sound in French words like plan [plɒ̃], temps [tɒ̃] and non-nasal vowels /an/ (often spelled -ann or -ane) as in the French words plane [plan] or tanne [tan].) Glucksmann the following day retorted: "It is not done, to play upon names that sound either Jewish or foreign", adding that Mélenchon played with "the worst codes of antisemitism". Newspaper Le Monde and socialist Member of Parliament Jérôme Guedj have also condemned this word play as antisemitic. Guedj wrote on X (social network): "Antisemitic drifts and complacency for violence, it's a transparent electoral strategy. He wants to be the most detestable. And, behold, the rare thing that he succeeds". Mélenchon apologized that day, saying it was just a mistake and that he had been deforming many more names in that same speech: Mickaël Idrac (candidate for La France Insoumise for becoming mayor of Perpignan), Violette Spillebout, Clinton and Trump.

=== Accusations of promoting conspiracy theories ===
In 2011, journalist Rudy Reichstadt, director of Conspiracy Watch, commented that while it would be "quite unfair" to call Mélenchon a conspiracy theorist, he did sometimes abet antisemitic conspiracy theories by downplaying them or making excuses for those who promulgate them.

In June 2021, Mélenchon predicted that, in the last week of the 2022 presidential campaign, there would be a "grave incident or murder" that would be used to "point the finger at the Muslims and to invent a civil war". He cited the attack on retiree Paul Voise in 2002 shortly before the 1st round of the presidential election, the Jihadist attack against a Jewish school in Toulouse by Mohammed Merah a few months before the presidential election of 2012, and the terrorist attack in Paris a few days before the first round of the 2017 presidential election. His statements were supported by his own party and condemned by other political parties. He later clarified that he was referring to "murderers [who] are waiting for the best time to get people talking about them" and the politicians who use these events for electoral purposes. Reichstadt described Mélenchon's statement as "ambiguous" and quite close to conspiracy beliefs. He claimed that Mélenchon has been promoting conspiracy theories for several years.

== Personal life ==
Mélenchon was previously married to Bernadette Abriel, a librarian. The couple had one daughter, Maryline (born 1974), who had various jobs in the public sector. He was in a relationship with local politician Pascale Le Néouannic from the 1990s until 2002.

Since the beginning of the 2010s, Mélenchon has been in a relationship with Sofia Chikirou, a member of his own party. His relationship with Sofia Chikirou is considered an open secret. She has been nicknamed "the boss's wife".

== Political career offices ==
Governmental functions

- Minister of Vocational Education, 2000–2002

Electoral mandates

- National Assembly
  - Member for Bouches-du-Rhône's 4th constituency, 2017–2022
- European Parliament
- Member of the European Parliament, 2009–2017
- Senate
- Senator of Essonne, 1986–2000 (became minister in 2000), 2004–2010 (resignation, elected in European Parliament in 2009). Elected in 1986, re-elected in 1995 and 2004. At the age of 35, he was the youngest member of the Senate when he was initially elected to it.
- General Council
  - Vice-president of the General Council of Essonne, 1998–2001
  - General councillor of Essonne, 1985–1992, 1998–2004. Re-elected in 1998.
- Municipal Council
  - Deputy-mayor of Massy, Essonne, 1983–1995
  - Municipal councillor of Massy, Essonne, 1983–2001. Re-elected in 1989 and 1995.

Political function

- Co-president of the Left Party, 2008–2014

== Publications ==
Mélenchon's published works include:

- Mélenchon, Jean-Luc; Amar, Cécile (22 March 2017). De la vertu (in French). Editions de l'Observatoire. ISBN 979-1-03-290059-8.
- Jean-Luc Mélenchon sur le divan. La provocation comme strategie (in French), Dunod, 2025. ISBN 9782100877775
- Mélenchon, Jean-Luc (1 December 2016). L'avenir en commun : Le programme de la France insoumise et son candidat (in French). Seuil. ISBN 978-2021317510.
- Mélenchon, Jean-Luc (16 November 2016). Le hareng de Bismarck: Le poison allemand (in French) (paperback ed.). J'ai lu. ISBN 978-2290127940.
- Mélenchon, Jean-Luc (8 October 2014). L'ère du peuple (in French). Fayard. ISBN 978-2213685755.

== Distinctions ==
- Grand Officer of the Order of May (Argentina, 1988)
- Named "Politician of the Year" 2012 by GQ France
- Honorary Professor at the Universidad Nacional de Lanús (Argentina) in 2019
