= Colette Codaccioni =

French politician

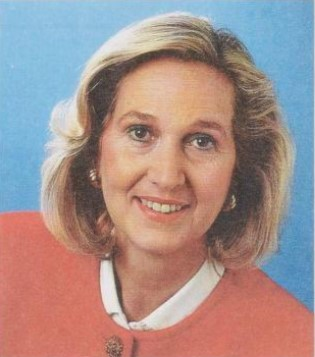

Minister of Solidarity between generations
- In office 18 May 1995 – 7 November 1995
- President: Jacques Chirac
- Prime Minister: Alain Juppé
- Preceded by: Laurent Cathala
- Succeeded by: Ségolène Royal

Member of the National Assembly for Nord's 1st constituency
- In office 2 April 1993 – 18 June 1995
- Preceded by: Pierre Mauroy
- Succeeded by: Jacques Richir

Personal details
- Born: Colette Roussez; 11 June 1942 (age 84) Winnezeele, France
- Party: RPR
- Education: University of Lille
- Profession: Midwife

Colette Codaccioni (born 11 June 1942) is a French politician, who was Minister of Solidarity between generations in the French cabinet for part of 1995.

== Biography ==
After studying at the Lille Faculty of Medicine, she became a midwife, worked in social action and entered politics with the RPR in 1981.

== Career ==
Elected Nord general councillor in 1992, then Nord MP in 1993, after a first unsuccessful attempt against Pierre Mauroy in 1988, she was appointed rapporteur for family issues at the National Assembly before being appointed Minister on June 19, 1995. Her deputy, Jacques Richir, replaces her at the Assemblée Nationale.
