= Frédéric Dutoit =

French politician (born 1956)

Frédéric Dutoit (born 26 May 1956 in Marseille) is a French politician from the French Communist Party.
