= Militant Forces =

2000s organized political party faction caucus

Militant Forces (French: Forces militantes) was an organized caucus in the French Socialist Party.

The faction was founded in 2003 by Marc Dolez, whose motion obtained 4.38% at the Dijon Congress the same year. Dolez was close the New World caucus. In 2005, members of the faction based around the Démocratie & Socialisme magazine joined the faction but left in 2007.

Dolez supported the left-wing motion led by Benoît Hamon at the Reims Congress in 2008, but Dolez, along with Jean-Luc Mélenchon (Trait d'Union) left the PS to found the Left Party (PG).
