= Trait d'Union =

Trait d'Union (English: "Hyphen") was an organized caucus in the French Socialist Party.

Trait d'Union was founded in August 2005 by supporters of Jean-Luc Mélenchon within the New World caucus. Soon afterward, the faction supported Laurent Fabius' motion at the Le Mans Congress and at the Reims Congress in 2008, it supported Benoît Hamon.

The faction wanted to serve as a trait d'union (hyphen) between the PS and the "other left" (notably the French Communist Party). It clearly supported alliances with the left, but rejected any alliance with the centrist MoDem.

The faction disappeared de facto after Mélenchon and Marc Dolez left the PS to form the Left Party.
