= New World (France) =

Organized caucus in the French Socialist Party

New World (French: Nouveau monde) was an organized caucus in the French Socialist Party.

New World was founded in 2002 following the implosion of the Socialist Left. Socialist Left members, including Jean-Luc Mélenchon were joined by followers of Henri Emmanuelli and his Democracy and Equality movement. The Militant Forces faction led by Marc Dolez never joined New World, but remained close to the faction throughout its existence.

At the 2003 Dijon Congress, the New World motion obtained 16.33%.

However, by 2004 the faction split into a rivalry between Henri Emmanuelli and Jean-Luc Mélenchon, the latter accusing the former of campaigning against his own party. The faction re-united briefly to lead the NO campaign to the 2005 French European Constitution referendum within the PS, but following the victory of the YES in the Socialist Party's internal referendum, the faction split for good between Henri Emmanuelli, who led a NO campaign within the PS and Jean-Luc Mélenchon who led a NO campaign with other parties of the left, such as the French Communist Party.

Mélenchon formed the Trait d'Union faction in 2005 and supported Laurent Fabius' motion at the Le Mans Congress. Henri Emmanuelli formed the Socialist Alternative before joining the NPS.
