= Marc Dolez =

French politician (born 1952)

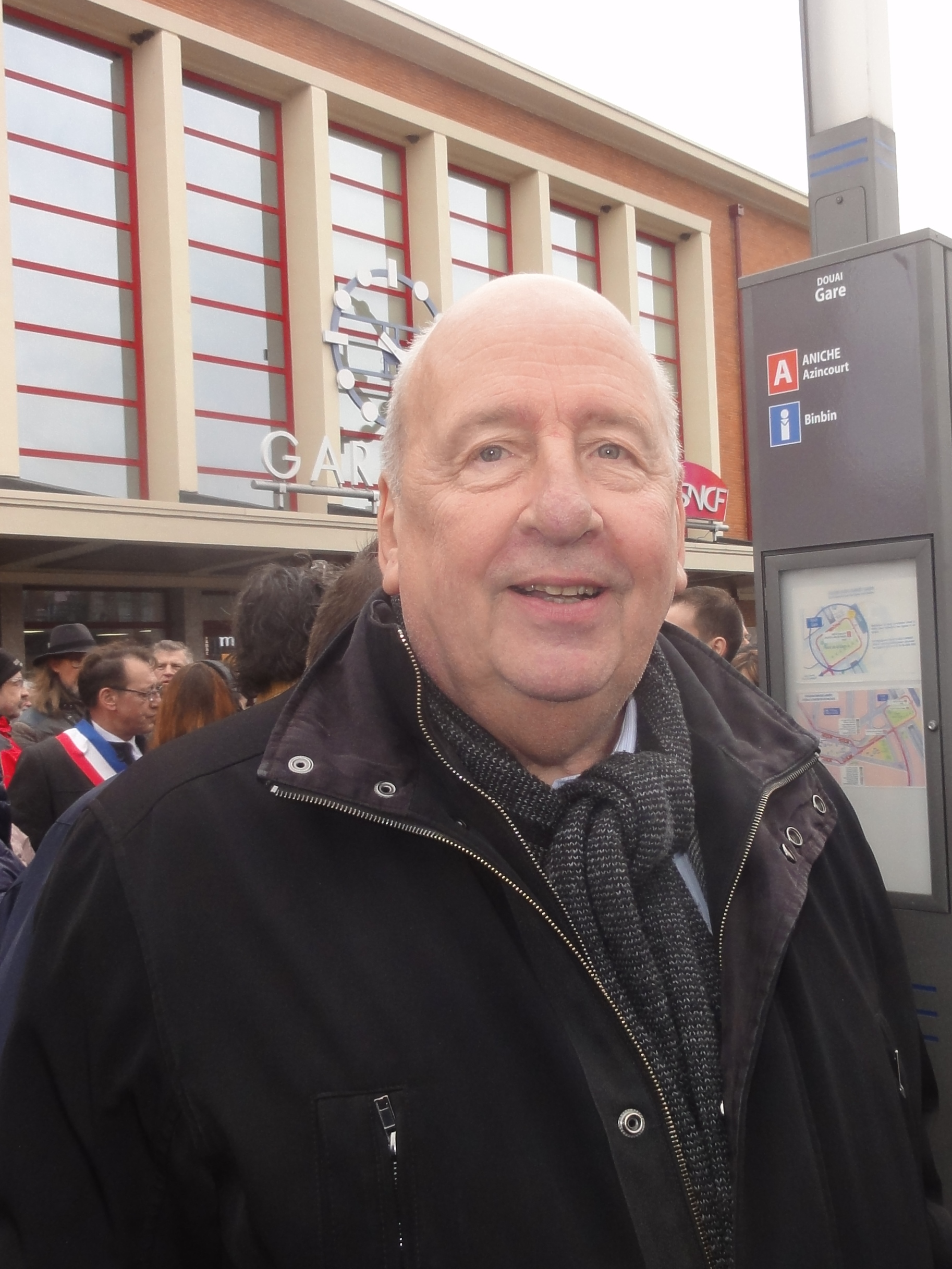

Member of the National Assembly for Nord's 17th constituency
- In office 12 June 1997 – 20 June 2017
- Preceded by: Jacques Vernier
- Succeeded by: Dimitri Houbron
- In office 23 June 1988 – 1 April 1993
- Succeeded by: Jacques Vernier

Personal details
- Born: 21 October 1952 (age 73) Douai (Nord)
- Party: Independent (since 2012)
- Other political affiliations: PS (1972-2008); PG (2008-2012)
- Website: http://www.marc-dolez.net/

Marc Dolez (born 21 October 1952, in Douai, Nord) is a French politician. He represented the Nord's 17th constituency from 1988 to 1993, and again from 1997 to 2017. A former member of the Socialist Party, he was a founding member, with PS Senator Jean-Luc Mélenchon, of the Left Party.

== Biography ==
He is the son of Carlos Dolez, MRP deputy for the Nord (French department) from 1958 to 1962.

He joined the Socialist Party (France) (PS) in 1972 at the age of 19.

He was a candidate in the 1984 European elections, ranked 29th on the Socialist Party (France) list.

He was elected to Congress for the first time in 1988. Defeated in 1993, he was re-elected in 1997 and served until 2017, when he decided not to run for re-election.

He was elected deputy on June 16, 2002, for the 12th legislature (2002-2007), in the Northern constituency (17th), with nearly 60% of the votes cast in the second round, against UMP candidate Françoise Prouvost. He sat with the Socialist Party (France) until November 2008.

Opposed to the hasty reshuffle of the PS national bureau following the defeat of April 21, 2002, and in particular the announced promotion of Laurent Fabius to the position of spokesperson, Marc Dolez resigned from this body in June 2002.

At the Socialist Party Dijon Congress, he created his own motion, Forces militantes, which obtained 4.7% of the vote, falling short of the 5% required to be represented in national bodies. However, thanks to an agreement with the Nouveau Monde faction, he joined the national bureau. He was also elected First Federal Secretary of the Northern Federation until 2005.

The only Socialist deputy to vote “no” during the vote at the Congress in Versailles authorizing the ratification of the Treaty establishing a Constitution for Europe, he campaigned against his party's majority opinion during the referendum on May 29, 2005.

A member of the New Socialist Party (Alternative Socialist tendency), he rejected the conclusions of the Le Mans Congress and left the NPS to form a new movement with Gérard Filoche, Forces militantes pour la démocratie et le socialisme (Militant Forces for Democracy and Socialism). This alliance was short-lived: Forces militantes split from Démocratie et socialisme, the movement led by Gérard Filoche, during the 2007 presidential campaign.

He was re-elected as deputy in June 2007 in his constituency, with more than 62% of the votes cast in the second round, again at the expense of Françoise Prouvost.

He signed Benoît Hamon motion in September 2008 during the Socialist Party's Reims Congress, alongside figures such as Jean-Luc Mélenchon, Henri Emmanuelli, and Marie-Noëlle Lienemann.
