= Nord's 17th constituency =

Constituency of the National Assembly of France

17th constituency of the Nord
- inline Constituency of the National Assembly of France

- Nord's 17th Constituency shown within Nord department
- Deputy: Thierry Tesson; Republican
- Department: Nord
- Cantons: Arleux, Douai-Nord (part), Douai-Nord-Est, Douai-Sud (part), Douai-Sud-Ouest.
- Registered voters: 75,067

The 17th constituency of the Nord is a French legislative constituency in the Nord département.

== Description ==
Nord's 17th constituency contains the majority of Douai as well as the rural canton of Arleux to the south.

The seat was held by Marc Dolez from 1988 to 2017, with the sole exception of between 1993 and 1997. Dolez left the Socialist Party to join Jean-Luc Mélenchon's Left Party in 2008. At the 2012 election he faced no candidate in the second round following the withdrawal of the Socialist Party candidate.

== Historic Representation ==
Election	Member	Party
1958	Narcisse Pavot	SFIO
1962	Narcisse Pavot	SFIO
1967	Paul Leloir	PCF
1968	Jean Durieux	RI
1973	Jean Durieux	RI
1978	Claude Wargnies	PCF
1981	Paul Moreau	PS
1986	Proportional representation - no election by constituency	
1988	Marc Dolez	PS
1993	Jacques Vernier	RPR
1997	Marc Dolez	PS
2002	Marc Dolez	PS
2007	Marc Dolez	PS
2008	Marc Dolez	PG
2012	Marc Dolez	PG
2017	Dimitri Houbron	LREM
2020	Dimitri Houbron	Agir
2022	Thibaut François	RN
2024	Thierry Tesson	LR

== Election results ==
=== 2024 ===
Legislative Election 2024: Nord's 17th constituency
Party	Candidate	Votes	%	±%
RN (UXD)	Thierry Tesson	21,803	47.92	+15.01
LR	Loick Brouazin	3,627	7.97	−16.16
PS (NFP)	Frédéric Chéreau	13,575	29.84	n/a
HOR (Ensemble)	Guillaume Honoré	5,739	12.61	−11.52
LO	Cédric Fluckiger	751	1.65	n/a
Turnout		45,495	97.37	+53.38
Registered electors		73,875		
2nd round result
RN	Thierry Tesson	23,873	55.80	+7.88
PS	Frédéric Chéreau	18,913	44.20	+14.36
Turnout		42,786	93.42	−3.95
Registered electors		73,889		
RN hold		Swing		

=== 2022 ===
Legislative Election 2022: Nord's 17th constituency
Party	Candidate	Votes	%	±%
RN	Thibaut François	10,414	32.91	+8.53
HOR (Ensemble)	Dimitri Houbron	7,636	24.13	+1.00
LFI (NUPÉS)	Cyril Grandin	7,250	22.91	−4.82
UDI (UDC)	Romain Boulant	1,688	5.33	−5.07
REC	Valérie Norreel	966	3.05	N/A
DIV	Isabelle Maman	841	2.66	N/A
PRG	Marion Thooft	661	2.09	N/A
Others	N/A	2,186	6.91	
Turnout		31,642	43.99	−1.50
2nd round result
RN	Thibaut François	15,408	53.57	+6.78
HOR (Ensemble)	Dimitri Houbron	13,354	46.43	−6.78
Turnout		28,762	42.37	+1.69
RN gain from LREM				

=== 2017 ===
Candidate	Label	First round		Second round	
Candidate	Label	Votes	%	Votes	%
Thibaut François	FN	7,993	24.38	12,697	46.79
Dimitri Houbron	REM	7,583	23.13	14,442	53.21
François Guiffard	FI	3,961	12.08		
Charles Beauchamp	PCF	3,955	12.07		
Frédéric Nihous	LR	3,408	10.40		
Jean-Luc Hallé	DVG	2,876	8.77		
Agnès Dupuis	PS	1,174	3.58		
Lucile Wacheux	ECO	628	1.92		
Amid Benchabane	ECO	364	1.11		
Éric Pecqueur	EXG	309	0.94		
Gaëtan Duez	DIV	192	0.59		
Nicolas Rankowski	DVD	177	0.54		
Léopold Pons	DVD	159	0.49		
Votes		32,779	100.00	27,139	100.00
Valid votes		32,779	97.88	27,139	90.65
Blank votes		523	1.56	1,919	6.41
Null votes		187	0.56	881	2.94
Turnout		33,489	45.49	29,939	40.68
Abstentions		40,124	54.51	43,660	59.32
Registered voters		73,613		73,599	
Source: Ministry of the Interior

=== 2012 ===
Legislative Election 2012: Nord's 17th constituency
Party	Candidate	Votes	%	±%
PG (FG)	Marc Dolez	12,404	30.84	
PS	Monique Amghar*	9,141	22.73	
FN	Chantal Bojanek	8,234	20.47	
UMP	Bruno Bufquin	8,212	20.42	
MoDem	Bruno Vandeville	1,154	2.87	
Others	N/A	1,075		
Turnout		40,220	53.58	
2nd round result
PG (FG)	Marc Dolez	19,763	100.00	
Turnout		19,763	26.33	
PG gain from PS				

* Withdrew before the 2nd round

=== 2007 ===
Legislative Election 2007: Nord's 17th constituency
Party	Candidate	Votes	%	±%
PS	Marc Dolez	16,509	38.54	
UMP	Françoise Prouvost	13,539	31.60	
PCF	Jacques Michon	4,221	9.85	
FN	Marie-Paule Darchicourt	2,659	6.21	
MoDem	Dominique Becar-Rojee	2,013	4.70	
Others	N/A	3,898		
Turnout		43,579	58.09	
2nd round result
PS	Marc Dolez	25,847	62.14	
UMP	Françoise Prouvost	15,746	37.86	
Turnout		43,303	57.72	
PS hold				

=== 2002 ===
Legislative Election 2002: Nord's 17th constituency
Party	Candidate	Votes	%	±%
PS	Marc Dolez	15,855	36.40	
UMP	Françoise Prouvost	11,733	26.94	
FN	Monique Lamare	6,264	14.38	
PCF	Therese Pernot	3,550	8.15	
CPNT	Frederic Nihous	1,316	3.02	
UDF	Didier Sniadach	1,061	2.44	
Others	N/A	3,781		
Turnout		44,416	60.68	
2nd round result
PS	Marc Dolez	23,986	59.98	
UMP	Françoise Prouvost	16,005	40.02	
Turnout		41,677	56.94	
PS hold				

=== 1997 ===
Legislative Election 1997: Nord's 17th constituency
Party	Candidate	Votes	%	±%
PS	Marc Dolez	15,029	31.43	
RPR	Jacques Vernier	13,702	28.66	
PCF	Pierre Lefebvre	7,672	16.05	
FN	Jean-Marie Lamare	6,677	13.97	
LO	Roger Marie	1,296	2.71	
LV	Geneviève Pirrieros	1,027	2.15	
Others	N/A	2,408		
Turnout		49,580	69.25	
2nd round result
PS	Marc Dolez	29,431	59.53	
RPR	Jacques Vernier	20,005	40.47	
Turnout		51,446	71.86	
PS gain from RPR				

== Sources ==
- Official results of French elections from 1998: "Résultats électoraux officiels en France" (in French).
