= Second Grenoble Congress =

The Second Grenoble Congress was the nineteenth national congress of the French Socialist Party (Parti socialiste or PS). It took place from November 24 to 26, 2000

== Results ==
Popular vote
| Hollande Motion | 72.94% |
| Democracy and Equality | 13.78% |
| Socialist Left | 13.28% |

François Hollande was re-elected as First Secretary.
