= Democracy and Equality =

Democracy and Equality (French: Démocratie - Égalité) was an organized caucus in the French Socialist Party.

The faction was founded in 2000 by Henri Emmanuelli and Alain Vidalies. At the Second Grenoble Congress, the faction obtained 13.78% of the vote.

The short-lived movement joined the New World, formed by the merger of Democracy and Equality with the remnants of the Socialist Left in 2002.
