= L'Insoumission Hebdo =

Defunct French newspaper

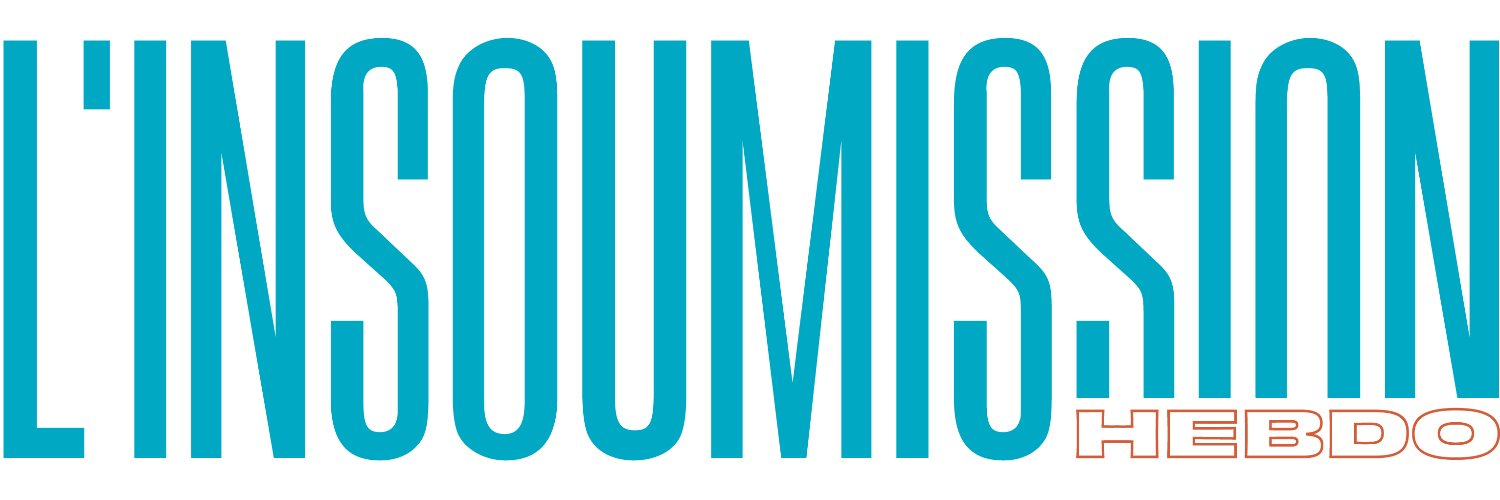
- Owner(s): La France Insoumise, Left Party
- Founder: Jean-Luc Mélenchon
- Editor-in-chief: Christiane Chombeau
- Founded: 1979
- Ceased publication: 2022
- Language: French
- Website: www.linsoumissionhebdo.fr

L'Insoumission Hebdo ("Insubordination Weekly") was a left-wing newspaper published in France. It was created by a prominent socialist politician Jean-Luc Mélenchon and was owned by La France Insoumise and Left Party, French political parties both founded by Mélenchon. It ceased publication in 2022 after merging with Le Journal de l'Insoumission.

== History ==
L'Insoumission Hebdo was created in 1979 as a weekly ecosocialist newspaper, it was founded by Jean-Luc Mélenchon, member of Socialist Party and future founder of La France Insoumise. In 2000 it was renamed to A Gauche and was run by a left-wing politician François Delapierre, until his death on 20 June 2015. In 2016, it was renamed to L'Heure du peuple, and then to L'Insoumission Hebdo shortly after. As of 2016, the newspaper was being run by a group of writers, with Matthias Tavel being their publishing director and Christiane Chombeau being their lead editor. In 2022 the newspaper abruptly stopped publishing articles, the reason was unknown until 19 March 2023. The newspaper announced that it would be switching from a weekly to a monthly publication and that it was merging with another newspaper called Le Journal de l'Insoumission.
