= Socialist Left =

Socialist Left might refer to:

- Socialist Left (Argentina)
- Socialist Left (Australia), a faction of the Australian Labor Party
- Socialist Left (Germany), a current in the Left Party
- Socialist Left (France), a caucus of the French Socialist Party
- Socialist Left (Peru)
- Socialist Left (Quebec), a faction of Québec solidaire

Socialist Left might also refer to:

- Socialist Left Party (Austria)
- Socialist Left Party (Norway)
- Union of the Socialist Left, French former political movement
