= Thibaut François =

French politician

Member of the National Assembly for Nord's 17th constituency
- In office 22 June 2022 – 9 June 2024
- Preceded by: Dimitri Houbron
- Succeeded by: Thierry Tesson

Personal details
- Born: 10 December 1989 (age 36) Strasbourg, France
- Party: National Rally
- Occupation: Civil servant, politician

Thibaut François (born 10 December 1989) is a French politician of the National Rally who was elected as a Member of the National Assembly for Nord's 17th constituency in 2022.

François was born in 1989 in Strasbourg. He worked as a civil servant before entering politics.

In 2020, he was elected as a municipal councillor in Douai for the National Rally. For the 2022 French legislative election, he stood as the RN candidate in Nord's 17th constituency and took the seat in the second round defeating incumbent Dimitri Houbron. He had previously stood in the same constituency in 2017 but was not elected. Since his election to the National Assembly he sat on the foreign affairs committee.

== See also ==
- List of deputies of the 16th National Assembly of France
