= La France Insoumise =

French political party

France Unbowed La France insoumise
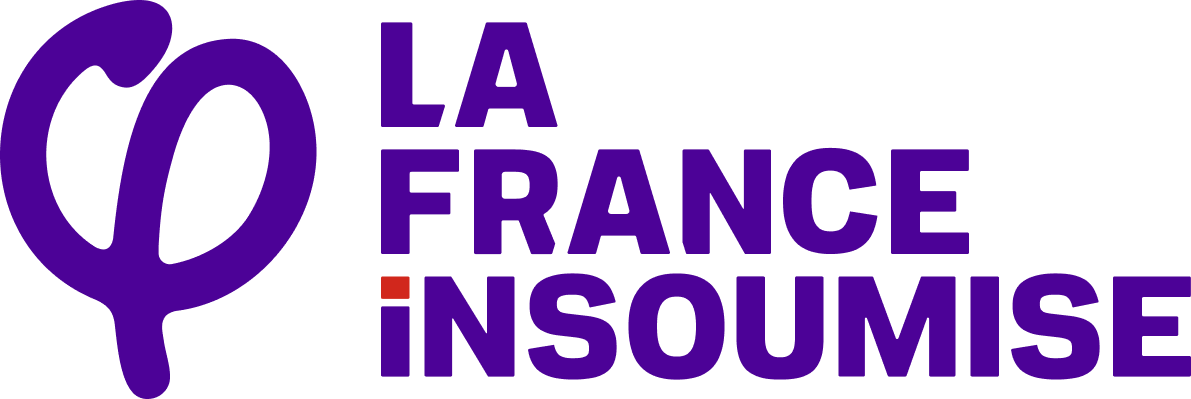
- Abbreviation: LFI, FI
- Coordinator: Manuel Bompard
- Founder: Jean-Luc Mélenchon
- Founded: 10 February 2016; 10 years ago
- Split from: Left Party
- Newspaper: L'Insoumission Hebdo (until 2022)
- Membership (2023): 3 (legal members) c. 370,000 (claimed "movement" members; membership is free)
- Ideology: Democratic socialism; Eco-socialism; Left-wing populism; Soft Euroscepticism
- Political position: Left-wing to far-left
- National affiliation: New Popular Front (since 2024); NUPES (2022–2024)
- European affiliation: European Left Alliance for the People and the Planet; Now the People !
- European Parliament group: The Left in the European Parliament
- Colours: Purple
- National Assembly: 71 / 577
- Senate: 1 / 348
- European Parliament (French seats): 9 / 81
- Presidencies of departmental councils: 0 / 101
- Presidencies of regional councils: 0 / 17

Website
- lafranceinsoumise.fr
- Politics of France; Political parties; Elections; A: The party has been described as left-wing, as well as far-left. Far-left is a label used by its critics, including French President Emmanuel Macron, to compare it with the far-right National Rally (RN), but political scientists prefer the label "radical left". For the 2026 municipal elections, the Ministry of the Interior classified LFI as "far-left", a decision the Conseil d'État upheld.

La France Insoumise (French: [la fʁɑ̃s ɛ̃sumiz], lit. 'France Unbowed'; LFI or FI) is a left-wing to far-left political party in France. It was launched in 2016 by Jean-Luc Mélenchon, then a Member of the European Parliament (MEP) and former co-president of the Left Party (PG). It aims to implement the eco-socialist and democratic socialist program L'Avenir en commun (transl. A Shared Future).

The party nominated Mélenchon in the 2017 French presidential election. He came fourth in the first round, receiving 19.6% of the vote and failing to qualify for the second round by around 2%. After the 2017 French legislative election, it formed a parliamentary group of 17 members of the National Assembly, with Mélenchon as the group's president. In the 2019 European Parliament election in France, it won six seats, below its expectations.

In 2022, Mélenchon again became the party's candidate for president, and later, Christiane Taubira, winner of the 2022 French People's Primary, endorsed Mélenchon. In the first round of 2022 French presidential election voting in April, Mélenchon came third, garnering 7.7 million votes (21.95%), narrowly behind second-place finisher Marine Le Pen.

== History ==
Former logo of the party

La France Insoumise was founded on 10 February 2016, based on the belief that traditional parties and political organisations no longer serve democracy. The movement is inspired by the Spanish party Podemos, the election of Jeremy Corbyn as Labour Party leader in the United Kingdom in 2015 and the candidacy of Bernie Sanders in the 2016 Democratic Party presidential primaries in the United States. Its first meeting took place in Place de la Bataille-de-Stalingrad, Paris, on 5 June 2016 in the form of a march numbering about 10,000 people, according to the organisers. A second meeting took place in the gardens of the Toulouse Observatory on 28 August 2016.

The programme L'Avenir en commun (transl. A shared future) was adopted during the Lille convention, attended by just under 1,000 people in Saint-André-lez-Lille on 15/16 October 2016. Several people addressed the convention, including former Société Générale trader Jérôme Kerviel, LuxLeaks whistleblower Antoine Deltour, political specialist Paul Ariès, former Malian Minister of Culture Aminata Traoré, and former Speaker of the Hellenic Parliament Zoe Konstantopoulou.

At this convention, the movement also presented twenty candidates for the 2017 French legislative election, including Jean-Marie Brom, physicist, research director of the French National Center for Scientific Research (CNRS) and spokesperson of Sortir du nucléaire; Rémy Garnier, public finance inspector and whistleblower in the Cahuzac affair; Lionel Burriello, leader of the CGT union for the ArcelorMittal steel works in Florange; Mehdi Kémoune, deputy secretary-general of the CGT union for Air France; actress Sophie De La Rochefoucauld; Marie-Hélène Bourlard, trade unionist featured in the movie Merci patron!; Olivia Cattan, journalist and founder of the association SOS Autisme France; and Nathalie Seguin, trade unionist and member of the French Communist Party (PCF).

In August 2017, La France Insoumise organized its first summer university (called Les AmFIs, a play on the word amphitheater and the acronym FI for France insoumise), a tradition in France where campuses open their doors to political party gatherings and meetings between activists, elected officials, philosophers, and cultural commentators. It was set in the Marseille Saint-Charles University and comprised four days of debates, conferences and workshops. The movement also debated its future.

In the 2017 Corsican territorial election, local supporters of La France Insoumise under the banner of La Corse Insoumise allied with the PCF. The PCF-FI alliance attacked Jean-Luc Mélenchon, and Mélenchon disavowed the list. During the 2024 French legislative election, La France Insoumise refused the nomination of five "rebels": Frédéric Mathieu, Danielle Simonnet, Raquel Garrido, Alexis Corbière, and Hendrik Davi.

=== 2017 presidential campaign ===
The 2017 presidential campaign was directed by Manuel Bompard, national secretary of the PG, its spokesperson was Alexis Corbière, former councillor of Paris and also national secretary of the PG and its coordinators were Charlotte Girard, lecturer in public law at the Paris Nanterre University and Jacques Généreux, lecturer in economy at the Paris Institute of Political Studies.

On 15 November 2016, Mélenchon held a meeting at Le Manège conference centre in Chambéry. Another similar meeting was held on 29 November at the Théâtre Femina in Bordeaux. This meeting was attended by 1,100 people, with several hundred more people outside unable to fit into the theatre. Another large meeting took place on 18 March 2017 in Place de la Bastille in Paris.

La France Insoumise was polling at 11.5% a month before the first vote. Mélenchon received 19.58% in the ballot, finishing fourth and not reaching the final round by a few hundred thousand votes; despite this, Mélenchon was the most voted candidate of the French left, eclipsing the Socialist Party candidate Benoît Hamon.

=== 2022 presidential campaign ===
In November 2020, Mélenchon announced his intention to run for the 2022 presidential election. He conditioned his candidacy to a petition put online by his La France Insoumise party. After winning the threshold of 150,000 signatures, he formally became the party's candidate for the election. In the first round of voting, Mélenchon garnered 7.7 million votes, coming in third among twelve candidates with 22% of the vote, behind president Emmanuel Macron in first place with 28%, and narrowly behind Marine Le Pen with 23% of the vote.

=== 2024 legislative elections ===
The far-right National Rally achieved unexpected success in the 2024 EU parliamentary election, sparking significant fear of a hard-right parliamentary majority. In June, these fears would result in the formation of the New Popular Front, a left-wing electoral alliance that included La France Insoumise as a founding member. La France Insoumise rallied in the polls after this, with the New Popular Front supporting more extensive co-operation between left-wing parties. The party achieved success in this election, winning 71 seats. The New Popular Front won 192 seats, constituting a plurality, with La France Insoumise contributing the largest proportion of its seats.

== Ideology ==
Ideologically, La France Insoumise is variously described as holding democratic socialist, anti-neoliberal, eco-socialist, souverainist, left-wing populist, and soft Eurosceptic positions. On the political spectrum, the party is described as left-wing, as well as far-left. (Note: There is no clear consensus among scholars on the far-left and its definition, with some scholars using different definitions but agreeing that there are differences and pluralism within it; both historians and political scientists generally agree that left-wing parties like La France Insoumise that "plays the ballot box game fully and does not plan to take power through the Revolution" is an essential definition criterion that distinguish it from the far-left. According to political science researcher Christine Pina, what distinguishes the mainstream left from the far-left (where despite the oppositions and differences in militant cultures between Trotskyists, Maoists, and libertarian socialists or anarchists, they all share three common denominators that distinguish them from the mainstream left) is that the far-left proposes a sort of maximum programme. In the words of historian Aurélien Dubuisson (associate researcher at The Sciences Po Centre for History) and sociologist Paolo Stuppia (member of the European Centre for Sociology and Political Science) discussing the New Popular Front, a broad left-wing alliance of which La France Insoumise was one of its main members, "[w]hile admitting immediate and transitory requests such as that of a better sharing of added value for the benefit of employees, the 'far-left' defends above all a maximalist programme in which the abolition of the capitalist model (today we also speak of fossil capital) occupies a central place. ... However, none on the left, including La France Insoumise, despite its radical criticisms of economic neoliberalism, defends such a process which would consist in a transformation of positive law to organise, even gradually, the disappearance of capitalist exploitation and the competition paradigm".) Far-left is also a label often used by its critics, including the incumbent centrist French president Emmanuel Macron and former socialist French President François Hollande.

According to political scientist Rémi Lefebvre, the programme of La France Insoumise is part of a socialism that is "very interventionist, very reformist, that believes in the essential role of public services, in ecological planning, in redistribution", and what it questions is "more ultraliberalism than capitalism itself". According to Aurélien Dubuisson, an associate researcher at the Sciences Po Historical Centre and author of The Far Left in France published by the Blaise Pascal University Press, defining La France Insoumise as far-left is "a mistake that has been made in recent years, especially by the right wing of the political spectrum". Dubuisson cites François Mitterrand's programme from 1981, which he said would be considered "the worst extremist of the moment. But in 1981, the political context was different, it was permeated by left-wing themes." According to both Dubuisson and Lefebvre, the programme of La France Insoumise is no more radical than Mitterand's.

Candidates of the party for the June 2017 legislative elections were 60% from civil society (have never been members or elected representatives of a political party), with an average age of around 43 years. The invested candidates have signed the charter of the movement as well as the ethical charter of the independent association Anticor, committed to ethics in politics, the fight against corruption and tax noncompliance. Beginning in late 2018, Mélenchon and the leadership of La France Insoumise made a significant shift by abandoning their sovereigntist and ultra-secularist stances. This decision led to the expulsion of key members such as Georges Kuzmanovic, marking a clear change in the party's ideological direction.

Islamophobia has been a controversial question on the French Left; La France Insoumise puts opposing Islamophobia high among its priorities. The party receives high numbers of votes from Muslim communities. Jean-Luc Mélenchon reportedly altered his policies to attract Muslim votes. For example, he began speaking out against Islamophobia in France, notably by participating in the "March Against Islamophobia" in 2019 and organized protests after the Bayonne mosque shooting. He became, as El País called him, one of the "great enemies" of satirical newspaper Charlie Hebdo as well as "laïcité" (secularism in France). Mélenchon advocated that French become a "common language" and be renamed, becoming a Creole language. He argued that French had spread to other countries as a result of colonialism and was "no longer the exclusive property of the French nation".

The 2022 L'Avenir en commun programme for the Popular Union includes a number of proposals, such as replacing capitalism. In August 2025, during the congress of France Insoumise, in Châteauneuf-sur-Isère, near Valence in the Drôme, the party called for a strike for 10 September 2025, to oppose the 2026 budget bill, presented by François Bayrou.

LFI supported the BDS movement, was the first party to accuse Israel of committing genocide and criticized the French government's support for Israel. The party called for sanctions and an arms embargo on Israel and is the only left-wing party in the country who refused to recognize Palestinian militant group Hamas as a terrorist organization, preferring to designate them as "Palestinian forces" responsible for "war crimes". Mathilde Panot said the party wishes to recognize Palestine as a country. As the Gaza war took place, the conflict was one of the main topics the party discussed during the 2024 European Parliament election.

=== Political programme ===
The drawing up of the programme was coordinated by economist Jacques Généreux and lawyer Charlotte Girard. It drew its inspiration from L'Humain d'abord (transl. Human First), the programme of the Left Front during the 2012 French presidential election, from work carried out by the PG during its conventions on eco-socialism and summits for a "plan B in Europe", and from contributions from supporters of the movement, which the rapporteurs were asked to synthesize. At the end of the Lille Convention, a synthesis of all the proposals resulted in a programme of seven axioms and 357 measures. It was adopted by more than 90% of voters. The movement proposes "ten emblematic measures", approved during the Lille Convention, calling for four main "emergencies" to be addressed: the democratic emergency, the social emergency, the ecological emergency, and the geo-political emergency. Adopted by 77,038 votes in an Internet poll, these ten measures are:

- The formation of a constituent assembly tasked with writing the constitution of a proposed French Sixth Republic to succeed the French Fifth Republic. Members of the movement consider the Fifth Republic to be a "presidential monarchy", in which too much power is concentrated in the office of the President of the Republic, with the people unable to exercise control over its actions. This constitutional process could also consider alternative forms of legislative elections, such as proportional representation. Constitutional and therefore institutional change is considered fundamental by the movement, which sees decreasing electoral turnout as a rejection by French people of their institutional system.
- The repeal of the El Khomri law (labour reform passed in 2016 by the Second Valls government) which the movement believes has ended the "hierarchy of standards" in French labour law by reversing the "principle of favour" and thus failed to sufficiently protect workers.
- The "democratic re-founding" of the European Union treaties including changes in monetary policy, common agricultural policy, and environmental policy. Failing this, the program envisages a "Plan B" of unilateral exit from European treaties, followed by proposing further cooperation between countries.
- The implementation of an energy transition plan towards a target of 100% renewable energy in 2050, following the studies of the Association négaWatt and the public and interdepartmental agency of the environment and the control of the energy (ADEME). This transition involves shutting down France's nuclear power plants, criticised by the movement for their dependence on uranium supply, their alleged lack of safety, their radioactive waste management and their financial cost.
- The establishment of a "green rule" not to deprive nature more than can be replenished, nor produce more than it can bear, which the movement would propose during the constituent assembly process for inclusion in the new constitution.
- The right to dismiss elected representatives by recall election when they break campaign promises, or otherwise breach standards. The movement also wishes to propose this measure during the constituent assembly process.
- The protection of common goods such as air, water, food, living, health, energy, or currency by preventing their commodification in order to preserve the general interest and by developing corresponding public services.
- The separation of investment and retail banks aimed at separating speculative activities from lend and deposit activities in order to protect the latter and the creation of a public banking center, which would finance small and medium-sized enterprises (SMEs) and carry out credit policy on social and ecological criteria.
- Raising the minimum wage (called "SMIC") from 1,149 to 1,326 euros per month net for 35-hour weeks and raising civil servant salaries frozen since 2010.
- Withdrawal from free trade agreements such as the Transatlantic Trade and Investment Partnership (TTIP) and the Comprehensive Economic and Trade Agreement (CETA).

Other proposals include withdrawing from the North Atlantic Treaty Organization (NATO) to avoid French involvement in wars waged by the United States and thus only to act within the framework of the United Nations (UN); reinforcing the 35-hour work-week and moving towards 32 hours; and reducing the retirement age to 60. This programme, named L'Avenir en commun (transl. A Shared Future), was published by the Éditions du Seuil on 1 December 2016. It is based around seven axioms: a Sixth Republic; distribution of wealth; environmental planning; withdrawal from European treaties; peace and independence; human progress; and "on the borders of humanity" (ocean, space, and digital); thematic booklets, deepening the proposals of the movement, have also been published as the campaign progressed. The book rapidly entered the top 10 best-seller list by 9 December, with 110,000 copies printed. It was the subject of an adaptation in digital comic strip, broadcast on the Internet.

=== Alleged extremism ===
In October 2024, La France Insoumise said that the Representative Council of French Jewish Institutions (CRIF) forced people to follow the far-right Israeli government, it also accused CRIF president Yonathan Arfi of being far-right. This was a response to Arfi, for accusing the party of being "antisemitic" for its support of Palestine prior to the incident. Arfi said that some members of the party supported Hamas, such as LFI member Danièle Obono, who called Hamas a "resistance movement".

In June 2024, critics of LFI accused it of antisemitism again due to it officially rejecting calling Hamas a terrorist organization and for its choice of French-Palestinian jurist Rima Hassanas LFI's European Parliament member. She sparked controversy among the public after saying that Hamas is acting "legitimately under international law" in its conflict with Israel but "do not have the right to commit a number of abuses such as those that have been committed". A poll conducted by Institut français d'opinion publique in June of the same year found that 92% of Jewish pollers in France think that LFI is promoting antisemitism, 60% said they would leave France if the party comes to power.

The Muslim community's support for La France Insoumise sparked negative reactions among the media in France with multiple outlets accusing the party of adhering to "Islamo-leftism" and having a "communitarist" voter base. Marianne Magazine said the party is experiencing "fundamentalist entryism" from Muslim elements due to its policies appealing to them. Les Complices du mal, a book written by French-Syrian journalist Omar Youssef Souleimane and published by Plon, claimed that Islamists had "infiltrated" the party and that it contained sectarian and anti-republican factions. LFI later threatened legal action against Souleimane and Plon before the book was released.

In February 2026, following the killing of nationalist activist Quentin Deranque in Lyon by members of the anti-fascist group Jeune Garde Antifasciste, LFI politician and co-founder of the group Raphaël Arnault faced criticism. His parliamentary assistant, Jacques-Elie Favrot, was arrested for the killing. Mélenchon issued a statement calling Arnault "a good, hardworking MP" who "does honor" to the LFI. He said that LFI has "associated with, and deliberately aligned" with Jeune Garde Antifasciste, describing it as a "group which, in perfect discipline, studied, worked, raised its level of collective consciousness". Mélenchon added that he condemns violence.

In an interview with Radio J that month, French President Emmanuel Macron said that La France Insoumise is a far-left ("extrême gauche") political movement: "I believe there is not much mystery in saying that they are on the extreme left". He further criticized the party, noting that "in the positions they take, particularly on antisemitism, they contravene fundamental principles of the Republic", (thereby classifying LFI as a threat to the French Republic) and added that "antisemitic expressions [that] emerge [within LFI] must be combated".

Ahead of the 2026 French municipal elections, the Minister of the Interior classified La France Insoumise as far-left. The party took the matter to the Conseil d'État to challenge this decision and be classified simply as left-wing. In February 2026, the Conseil d'État, France's highest administrative court, upheld the Ministry of the Interior's decision to formally classify La France Insoumise as a far-left party on the French political spectrum. According to an IFOP poll, in February 2026, 70% of French people considered the Ministry of the Interior's decision to classify LFI as far-left to be justified.

In March 2026, The Guardian reported that the LFI was under fire from mainstream left-leaning parties for alleged extremism and violence, as well as accusations of antisemitism. It said that most voters considered the party too radical, and that alliances with LFI by mainstream parties may harm their electoral popularity rather than strengthen it.

== Organisation ==
=== Structure ===
Unlike a classical political party, the organisation is not fixed. Supporters' groups, small committees responsible for promoting Mélenchon's candidacy at a local level, have been established all over France and abroad.

=== Membership ===
Unlike traditional parties, LFI does not charge membership dues; joining is free and done through an online platform. In 2017, the movement claimed 540,000 members. In 2023, Le Parisien reported that the association legally registered as La France Insoumise had only three members, while the movement claimed around 370,000 members.

=== Political support ===
La France Insoumise is not a coalition of political parties; however, several political parties, branches or individuals announced their support for the movement once its programme had been agreed and its candidate chosen, including the Left Party, the Socialistes Insoumis, Ensemble!, the French Communist Party, the Pole of Communist Revival in France, and some elected officials and leaders of the Europe Ecology – The Greens (EELV). These organizations are not themselves parts of the movement.

==== Components of the Left Front ====
The Left Party, of which Mélenchon is a member, is the main political force involved in the movement. Several of its executives are organizing the campaign. The French Communist Party (PCF) is split on support for the movement. The party's national conference rejected a motion of support for Mélenchon by 55% on 5 November 2016, but party members voted three weeks later in favour of support, by 53.6%. Several executive members of the French Communist Party, including president Pierre Laurent and deputy Marie-George Buffet, have endorsed his candidacy.

In November 2016, Ensemble!, the third component of the Left Front coalition, also announced its support for the movement as 72% of its activists had voted in favour. They had been given the choice of three options: to support Mélenchon and work on a common framework (42% of the votes), to participate more directly in the campaign of La France Insoumise (30%) or to reject "at this stage" any support for Mélenchon (25%); however, the PCF and Ensemble! have chosen to lead "autonomous campaigns", maintaining their independence from the movement. Both parties print leaflets and posters and organize meetings without being associated with the political decisions of the campaign.

==== Europe Ecology – The Greens dissidents ====
In December 2016, the Social Ecology Co-Operative, whose members include political figures from Europe Ecology – The Greens (EELV), such as EELV federal councillor Francine Bavay, and Sergio Coronado, member of the National Assembly for French residents overseas, called for the endorsement of Mélenchon's candidacy. In February 2017, Yannick Jadot (the candidate nominated by the EELV Party presidential primary) withdrew in favour of Benoît Hamon (PS) on the basis of an agreement not approved by party members. Some EELV members, including elected representatives, then endorsed La France Insoumise.

On 10 March, 27 environmentalists, including MP Sergio Coronado, activists, local officials, candidates for the June legislative elections, and members of the EELV Federal Council, announced that they would not support Hamon in the first round of the presidential election but La France Insoumise instead. They pointed to the fact that Hamon "needs a strong Socialist Party for his campaign" whereas "the hope of an environmentalist left requires instead to get rid of it", criticised François Hollande's five-year term, and suggested that the integration of political ecology into candidates' programs is "recent and inconsistent" for Hamon, while "deep and lasting" for Mélenchon.

On 12 April, seven EELV federal councillors endorsed Mélenchon rather than Hamon. They noted that if Hamon won the presidency and a parliamentary majority, "the majority would be composed of those who have up to the end supported the policies of François Hollande and Manuel Valls", adding: "Who would think that a Socialist Party majority defending Hollande's five-year term would legislate in favour of a radically different social and environmental platform?" On 14 April, Éric Piolle, EELV mayor of Grenoble, also endorsed La France Insoumise.

=== International affiliation ===
The party is a member of the European Left Alliance for the People and the Planet, a European political party that supports an alternative to capitalism.

== Election results ==
=== Presidential ===
President of the French Republic
Election year	Candidate	1st round			2nd round			Winning Candidate
Election year	Candidate	Votes	%	Rank	Votes	%	Rank	Winning Candidate
2017	Jean-Luc Mélenchon	7,059,951	19.58	4th	—N/a			Emmanuel Macron
2022	Jean-Luc Mélenchon	7,712,520	21.95	3rd	—N/a			Emmanuel Macron

=== Legislative ===
National Assembly
Election	Leader	Votes (first round)		Seats		Result	Notes
Election	Leader	No.	%	No.	±	Result	Notes
2017	Jean-Luc Mélenchon	2,497,622	11.03	17 / 577	Steady	Opposition	
2022	Jean-Luc Mélenchon	3,142,354	13.82	65 / 577	▲48	Opposition	In coalition with the NUPES
2024	Manuel Bompard	3,364,445	10.49	64 / 577	▼1	Opposition	In coalition with the NFP

La France Insoumise did not participate in the Senate elections until 2023 because of the election's electoral college-based system that would disfavor newly created parties with few locally elected officials. For the 2023 elections, La France Insoumise unsuccessfully attempted to organize united lists with their NUPES partners before deciding to form their own lists.

=== European Parliament ===
Election	Leader	Votes	%	Seats	+/−	EP Group
2019	Manon Aubry	1,428,548	6.31 (#5)	6 / 79	New	The Left
2024 (Note: Run in a joint list with POI, REV, GES, Péyi-A and PLR, that won 9 seats in total.)	Manon Aubry	2,432,976	9.87 (#4)	9 / 81	▲3	The Left

== See also ==
- La France Insoumise group
- List of political parties in France
- La Meute (book)
