= Social republicanism =

Social republicanism (Républicanisme social) is a political current in the French left, particularly among social-democratic parties, with the goal of achieving a Republic rooted in social values.

== History ==
Several organizations within the radical left. For instance, Attac (Association for the Taxation of Financial Transactions and for Citizens' Action) and the Left Party (PG).

The notion of citizenship in this context aligns with what is called, in political philosophy, a "republicanist" view of political freedom within the tradition of civic humanism inspired by neo-Athenian ideals: political freedom is seen as participation in the life of the city-state (cité). As such, the concept of participatory democracy is a key element of this political current.

This distinguishes it from liberal thought of the modern era, which, according to critics, starts not with the concept of a citizen (as a member of a community or humanity) but with the individual. In political liberalism, the individual is seen as preexisting society and must be protected against infringements by other individuals or the state. For its critics, this corresponds to negative liberty or the "liberty of the moderns," as defined by Benjamin Constant. From the liberal perspective, republicanism is not an ideology of modernity but one belonging to ancient communities ("liberty of the ancients").

== Bibliography ==
- Irène Pereira, Les grammaires de la contestation: Un guide de la gauche radicale, La Découverte, 2010 ISBN 978-2359250114 p. 29 and following.
- Serge Audier, Les théories de la République, La Découverte, Collection Repères, 2004, 128 pages, cairn.
- Jean-Fabien Spitz, Le moment républicain en France, Essais, Paris, Éditions Gallimard, 2005, 526 pages, ISBN 2-07-077575-5, cairn, Revue d'histoire du XIXe siècle.
- Colloquium Un républicanisme social en France au XVIIIe siècle, Fondation Jean-Jaurès, Laboratoire interdisciplinaire LIRE de l’université Lyon 2, École doctorale de sciences humaines de l’université Paris 1 Panthéon Sorbonne, June 2012, general presentation.
