= Thierry Tesson =

French politician (born 1957)

Member of the National Assembly for Nord's 17th constituency
- Incumbent
- Assumed office 8 July 2024
- Preceded by: Thibaut François

Personal details
- Born: 22 April 1957 (age 68) Castelsarrasin, France
- Party: Republican
- Website: www.thierrytesson.fr

Thierry Tesson (born 22 April 1957) is a French politician. He was elected deputy for Nord's 17th constituency during the 2024 French legislative election.

== Biography ==
Thierry Tesson was born on 22 April 1957 in Sables-d'Olonne. A schoolteacher and then an associate professor of history, head of establishment before becoming an academy inspector and director of departmental services for national education (DSDEN) in Vienne, he joined the office of Xavier Darcos, Nicolas Sarkozy's Minister of National Education, in 2008, as a technical advisor responsible for priority education, urban policy, education for sustainable development and regional languages. He remained in Xavier Darcos's office following the latter's appointment to the Ministry of Labour in June 2009 as advisor responsible for city policy.

In September 2009, Thierry Tesson was promoted to director of the office of Fadela Amara, Secretary of State responsible for Urban Policy, and he remained in office until the departure of the Secretary of State during the reshuffle of 14 November 2010.

From July 2011 to May 2012, he was sub-prefect of Saintes (Charente-Maritime). He participated in the implementation of natural risk prevention plans, in particular those of the Charente river and prepares the implementation of the inter-municipality of the municipalities of the district under the provisions of the law of 19 December 2010.

Officially, Nicolas Sarkozy terminated Thierry Tesson's duties "at his request" just before his departure from the Élysée, but this subject is proving controversial. The person concerned considers himself dismissed and suspects that his proximity to Fadela Amara (who supported François Hollande) or his collaborations with the district's left-wing elected officials were the cause. However, according to the prefect of Charente-Maritime, Béatrice Abollivier, his departure follows an inspection of his personnel management. He therefore returns to his original body, the National Education.

As Academy Inspector for establishments and school life at the Lille rectorate from May 2012, Thierry Tesson was appointed by the Minister of National Education in March 2019 to manage the national Educational Cities program within the General Directorate of School Education (DGESCO). This interministerial policy (National Education, Interior, City) organizes the educational care of children and young people from 0 to 25 years old - before, during, around and after the school framework - within the priority neighbourhoods of the city policy.

During the 2020 French municipal elections, Thierry Tesson took the lead of a joint LR/UDI list called "Douai Capitale". The results obtained in the first round on March 15 (761 votes, or 9.32% of the votes cast) did not allow him to remain in the second round.

He was a candidate in the 2024 early legislative elections in Nord's 17th constituency on the list of Éric Ciotti, the Republicans on the right, supported by the National Rally. He was elected deputy in the second round with 55.80% of the vote, against Frédéric Chéreau, candidate of the NFP (44.20% of the vote).

== Mandates ==
- Since 8 July 2024: MP for Nord's 17th constituency.

== See also ==
- List of deputies of the 17th National Assembly of France
