= François Delapierre =

French politician (1970–2015)

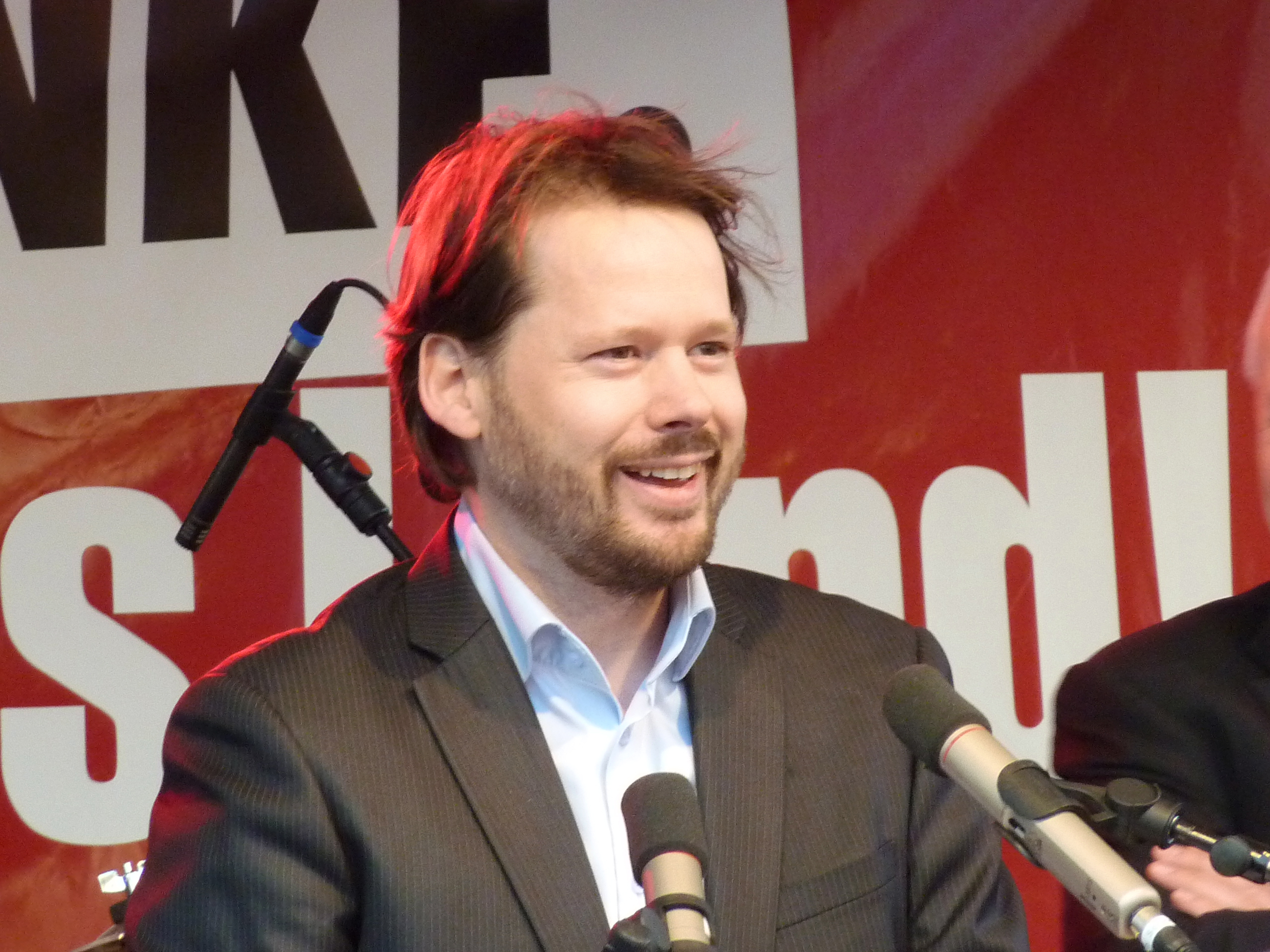
- François Delapierre in 2011

Member of the Regional Council of Île-de-France
- In office 2010–2015
- President: Jean-Paul Huchon
- Succeeded by: Kheira Genc

Personal details
- Born: 4 November 1970 Paris, France
- Died: 20 June 2015 (aged 44) Paris, France
- Party: Left Party
- Spouse: Charlotte Girard
- Education: Paris West University Nanterre La Défense; Sciences Po

François Delapierre (4 November 1970 – 20 June 2015) was a French politician. He served as the national secretary of the Left Party from December 2010 until his death in 2015. He was also a regional councillor of Île-de-France from February 2009 until his death. He was previously a member of the Socialist Party from 1986 to 2008. He was born in Paris.

Delapierre died from brain cancer on 20 June 2015 in Paris, aged 44.
