= La Meute (book) =

2025 book by Charlotte Belaïch and Olivier Pérou

La Meute : Enquête sur la France Insoumise de Jean-Luc Mélenchon ('The pack: Investigation into Jean-Luc Mélenchon's La France Insoumise') is a non-fiction book authored by journalists Charlotte Belaïch and Olivier Pérou, published in 2025 by Flammarion. The book is the culmination of over two years of investigative reporting into the internal workings and organizational methods of the French political movement La France Insoumise (LFI), led by Jean-Luc Mélenchon.

== Title ==
The title "La Meute" (The Pack) was chosen to reflect the perceived unwavering devotion of LFI's leadership and members to their leader, Jean-Luc Mélenchon. It suggests a tendency among them to defend him aggressively, even to the point of targeting opponents and critics.

== Genesis ==
The book is based on an extensive investigation conducted by Charlotte Belaïch (from Libération) and Olivier Pérou (from Le Monde). They collected testimonies from over 200 individuals, including current and former party officials as well as grassroots activists, most of whom agreed to be identified.

The work primarily offers a portrait of Jean-Luc Mélenchon and examines the relationships he and his close associates maintain within La France Insoumise. The authors describe internal party dynamics as tense and, at times, violent. They assert that "Mélenchon demands blind devotion. Those who doubt are considered traitors." The book frequently draws parallels between LFI's internal culture and that of a cult. It also highlights the significant influence of Sophia Chikirou, Mélenchon's partner, describing her as occupying a "central and unique" position within the movement.

Additionally, La Meute delves into controversies surrounding Jean-Luc Mélenchon and Sophia Chikirou, particularly accusations of antisemitism. The authors highlight instances where Mélenchon's rhetoric has been perceived as ambiguous or offensive by Jewish organizations and political commentators that are supporters of Israel.

== Reception ==
Prior to its release, excerpts from the book were widely disseminated in the media, sparking significant public reaction. For instance, Fabien Roussel, leader of the French Communist Party, commented that "the behavior of La France Insoumise's leadership resembled that of a cult under the influence of a couple—Jean-Luc Mélenchon and his partner Sophia Chikirou." Former deputy Clémentine Autain, who left LFI in 2023, said the book "explains exactly why I broke with La France Insoumise," denouncing "a virilistic culture of intimidation" that she argued stifled internal democracy and dissent.

Leading LFI figures immediately rejected La Meute’s allegations, especially the accusations of antisemitism. Mathilde Panot, President of the LFI parliamentary group, denounced the investigation as "mensonges" ("lies") on BFMTV, while Manuel Bompard took to X to accuse BFMTV of inventing falsehoods about the movement.

Nevertheless, it was reported that some grassroots members privately admitted to feeling embarrassed by the portrait painted in the book, and local LFI organisers were reportedly instructed to avoid media appearances in the days following its release to limit reputational damage.
