= Jacques Vernier (politician) =

French politician

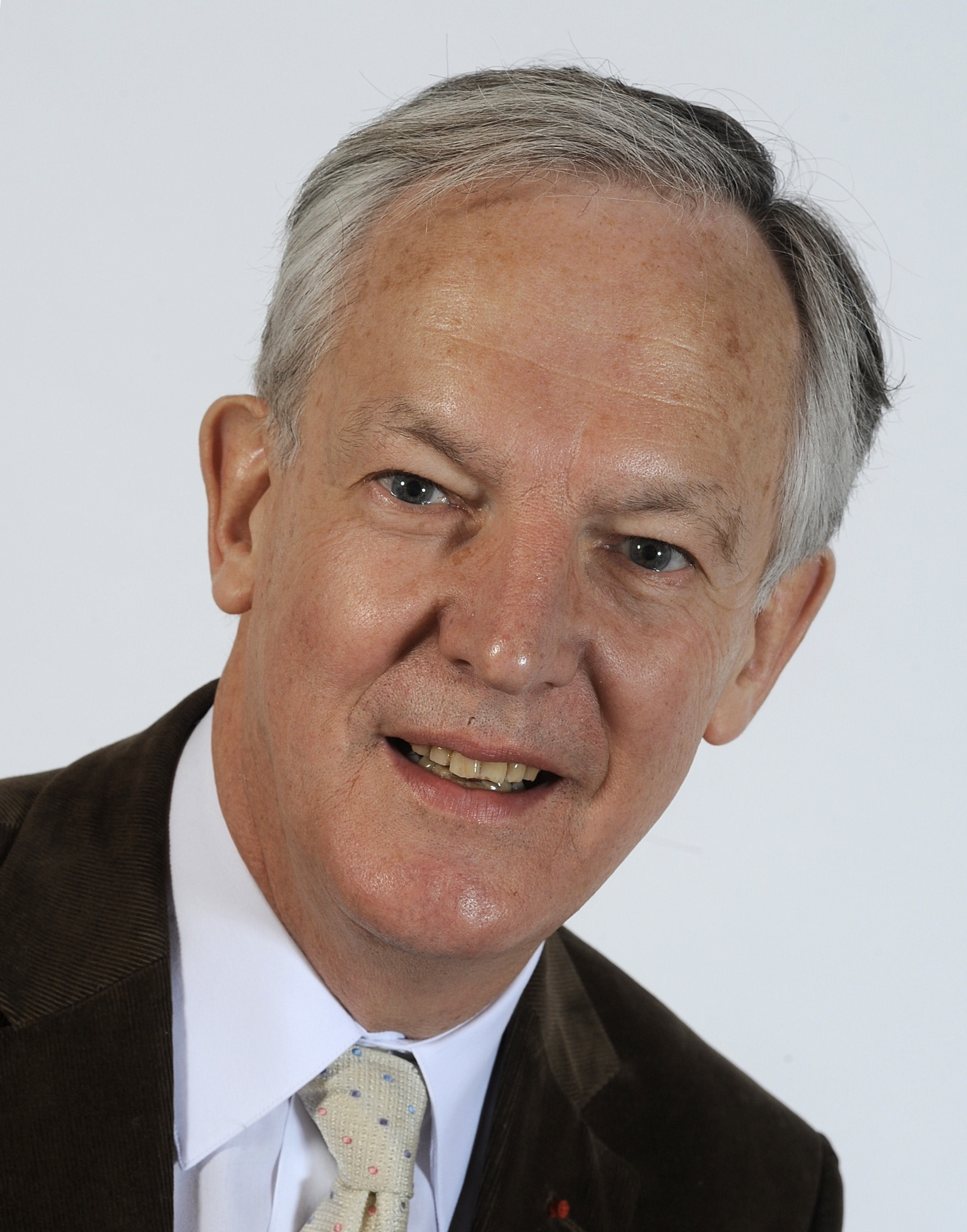
Jacques Vernier

Jacques Vernier (born 3 July 1944) is a former French politician (RPR).

From 1983 until 2014 he was mayor of Douai, from 1984 until 1993 Member of the European Parliament and from 1993 until 1997 member of the National Assembly of France representing Nord's 17th constituency.
