= Dijon Congress =

The Dijon Congress was the twentieth national congress of the French Socialist Party (Parti socialiste or PS). It took place from May 16 to 18, 2003.

The objective of the Congress was to start the reconstruction of the weakened party after its shocking defeat in the 2002 French presidential election.

== Results ==
Popular vote
Motion A (Hollande)	61.37%
Motion C (NPS)	16.88%
Motion E (New World)	16.33%
Motion D (Militant Forces)	4.38%
Motion B (Utopia)	1.05%

François Hollande was re-elected as First Secretary.
