= Reims Congress =

Socialist Party (France) leadership election
← 2005	27 October 2008	2012 →
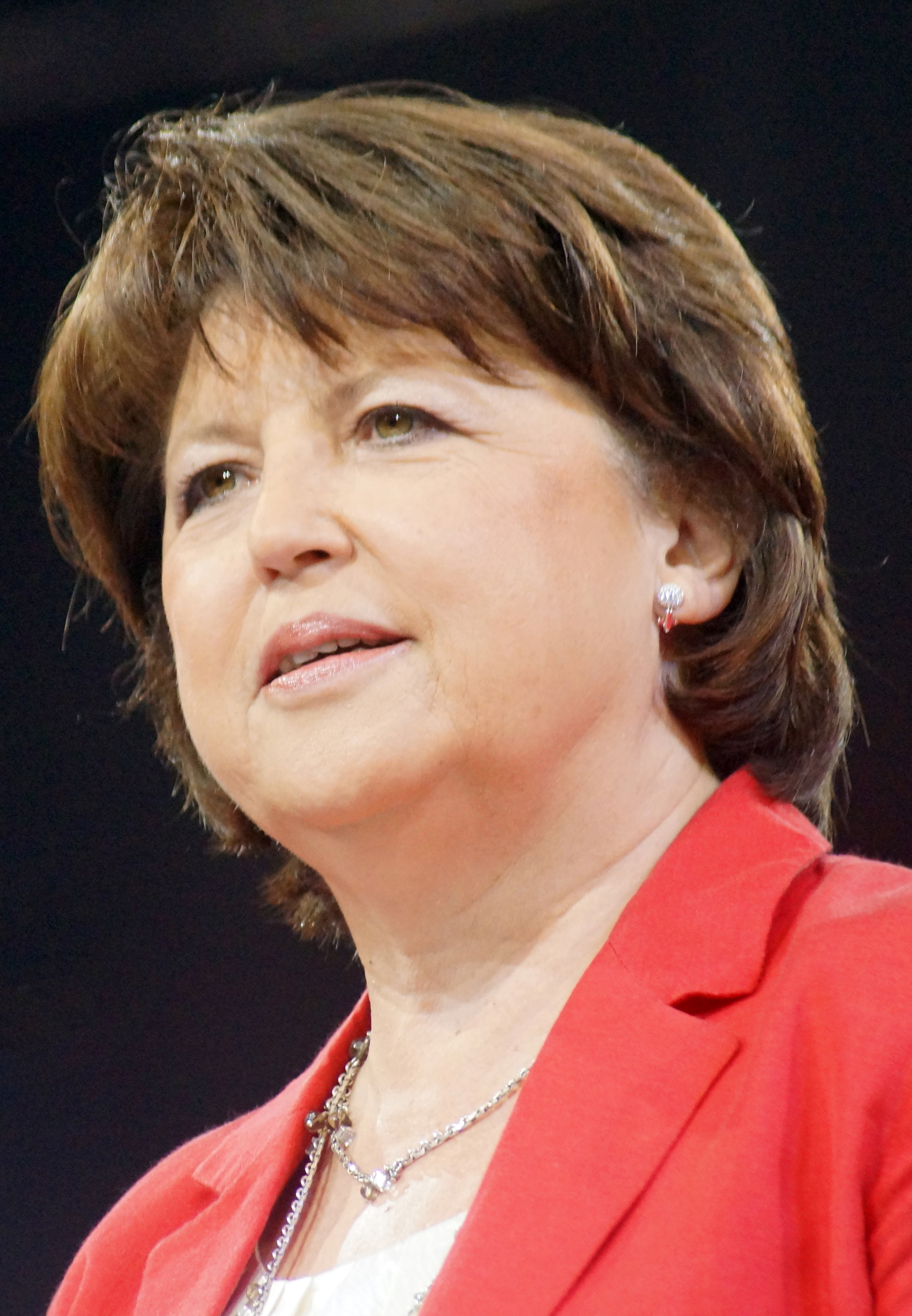

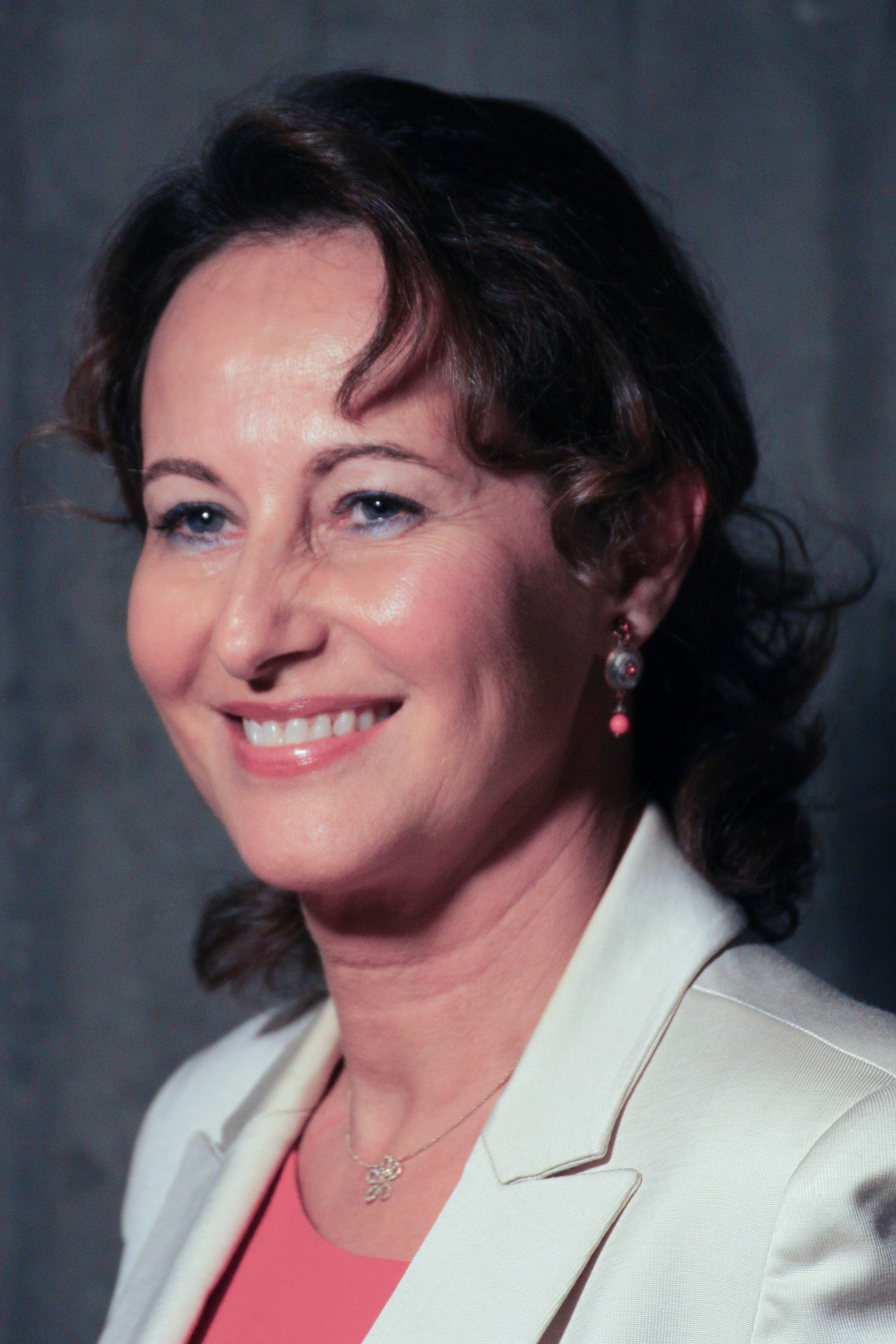
Candidate	Martine Aubry	Ségolène Royal
Party	PS	PS
Popular vote	67,451	67,349
Percentage	50.04%	49.96%
First Secretary before election
François Hollande
Elected First Secretary
Martine Aubry

The Reims Congress was the twenty-second national congress of the French Socialist Party (Parti socialiste or PS), taking place from 14 to 16 November 2008 in the city of Reims in the Marne.

Incumbent First Secretary François Hollande announced that he would not run again, opening the way for a three-way battle between 2007 presidential candidate, Ségolène Royal; Bertrand Delanoë, Mayor of Paris; and Martine Aubry, mayor of Lille. Each candidate endorsed motions that would be voted upon by the eligible voters as a determinant for the endorsement of each candidate.

== Motions ==
Six motions were presented to be voted upon by members:

- Clarity, courage, creativity (Clarté, courage, créativité): Led by Bertrand Delanoë and supported by François Hollande, Jean-Marc Ayrault, Michel Rocard, Lionel Jospin, and Élisabeth Guigou.
- For a staunchly ecologist Socialist Party (Pour un Parti Socialiste résolument écologique): Eco-socialist motion.
- A World in Front, Rebuilding hope on the left (Un monde d’avance, Reconstruire l'espoir à gauche): Eurosceptic and staunchly left-wing current led by Benoît Hamon and supported by Henri Emmanuelli, Marie-Noëlle Lienemann, Pierre Larrouturou, and Jean-Luc Mélenchon.
- Change on the Left to Change France (Changer à gauche pour changer la France): Left-wing motion led by Martine Aubry and supported by Laurent Fabius, Pierre Mauroy, Jack Lang, and Arnaud Montebourg.
- Hope on the left, proud to be Socialist (L'espoir à gauche, fier(e)s d'être socialistes): Motion led by Gérard Collomb on the behalf of Ségolène Royal and supported by Vincent Peillon, and Manuel Valls.
- Socialists, Alterglobalists, Ecologists (Socialistes, Altermondialistes, Écologistes): Motion led by the Utopia current.

=== Results of the Motions vote ===
128,978 out of 233,000 eligible voters took part in the election by motion, which represents a turnout of 55.38%

Popular vote
Motion 5 (Royal)	29.08%
Motion 1 (Delanoë)	25.24%
Motion 4 (Aubry)	24.32%
Motion 3 (Hamon)	18.52%
Motion 2 (Ecologist)	1.59%
Motion 6 (Utopia)	1.25%

== First-Secretary run-off ==
Bertrand Delanoë dropped out of the race for First Secretary during the Reims Congress and endorsed Martine Aubry the next day. Ségolène Royal stayed in the race, as did Benoît Hamon (endorsed by Utopia). Royal led in the first round of voting held on Thursday 20 November with around 42% against 34% for Aubry. Hamon had around 22% of the votes and was eliminated. He endorsed Aubry for the runoff, held the next day.

According to official results, Aubry won by a tiny margin of 42 votes, although Royal did not concede and called for a third round to be held. A PS National Council examined the results on Tuesday 25 November. In the recount, Aubry was declared the winner with wider margin of 102 votes

First round

Popular vote
Motion 5 (Royal)	42.13%
Motion 4 (Aubry)	34.02%
Motion 3 (Hamon)	22.85%

Second round

Popular vote
Martine Aubry	50.02
Ségolène Royal	49.98
