= Dimitri Houbron =

French politician

Dimitri Houbron (born 12 February 1991) is a French politician affiliated with Agir who served as a member of the French National Assembly from 2017 to 2022, representing the 17th constituency of the department of Nord.

== Political career ==
In parliament, Houbron served on the Committee on Legal Affairs. In this capacity, he was his parliamentary group's co-rapporteur (alongside Alexandra Louis) on a 2018 bill against sexual and gender-based violence.

In addition to his committee assignments, Houbron was member of the French delegation to the Inter-Parliamentary Union (IPU). He was also a substitute member of the French delegation to the Parliamentary Assembly of the Council of Europe (PACE) from 2019, where he served on the Committee on the Election of Judges to the European Court of Human Rights and the Committee on Equality and Non-Discrimination.

In July 2019, Houbron voted in favor of the French ratification of the European Union’s Comprehensive Economic and Trade Agreement (CETA) with Canada.

== See also ==
- 2017 French legislative election
