= Left Party (France) =

French political party

Left Party Parti de gauche
- Abbreviation: PG
- Coordinators: Éric Coquerel; Danielle Simonnet
- Founders: Jean-Luc Mélenchon; Marc Dolez
- Founded: 1 February 2009; 17 years ago
- Split from: Socialist Party
- Headquarters: 20–22 Rue Doudeauville, 75018 Paris
- Newspaper: L'Insoumission Hebdo (until 2022)
- Membership (2018): ▼6,000
- Ideology: Democratic socialism; Left-wing populism; Left-wing nationalism
- Political position: Left-wing to far-left
- National affiliation: New Popular Front (2024–present); New Ecological and Social People's Union (2022–2024); Left Front (2008–2018)
- European Parliament group: The Left in the European Parliament
- Colours: Red; Green
- National Assembly: 20 / 577
- Senate: 0 / 348
- European Parliament: 2 / 81
- Regional Councils: 7 / 1,880

Party flag

Website
- lepartidegauche.fr

The Left Party (French: Parti de gauche, PG) is a left-wing to far-left, democratic socialist political party in France, founded in 2009 by Jean-Luc Mélenchon and Marc Dolez after their departure from the Socialist Party (PS). The PG claims to bring together personalities and groups from different political traditions; it claims a socialist, ecologist and republican orientation.

Politically located between the Socialist Party and the French Communist Party, the Left Party intends to federate all the sensitivities of the anti-liberal left—which they also call "the other left"—within the same alliance. In 2008, the PG joined forces with the Communist Party of the United Left and six other left-wing and far-left organizations in the coalition of the Left Front, of which Jean-Luc Mélenchon was the candidate for the presidential election.

The PG was co-chaired from 2010 by Jean-Luc Mélenchon and Martine Billard. In 2016, the Left Party had 8,000 members. At the end of 2014, Jean-Luc Mélenchon and Martine Billard resigned, and the party leadership was then collectively ensured by the national secretariat. The weekly newspaper, L'Intérêt général (formerly À gauche) is sent to all members but also to simple subscribers. It is printed at more than 15,000 copies a week.

In 2016, in view of the presidential and legislative elections of the following year, Jean-Luc Mélenchon formed a new movement, La France Insoumise, that the Left Party helped to animate.

== History ==
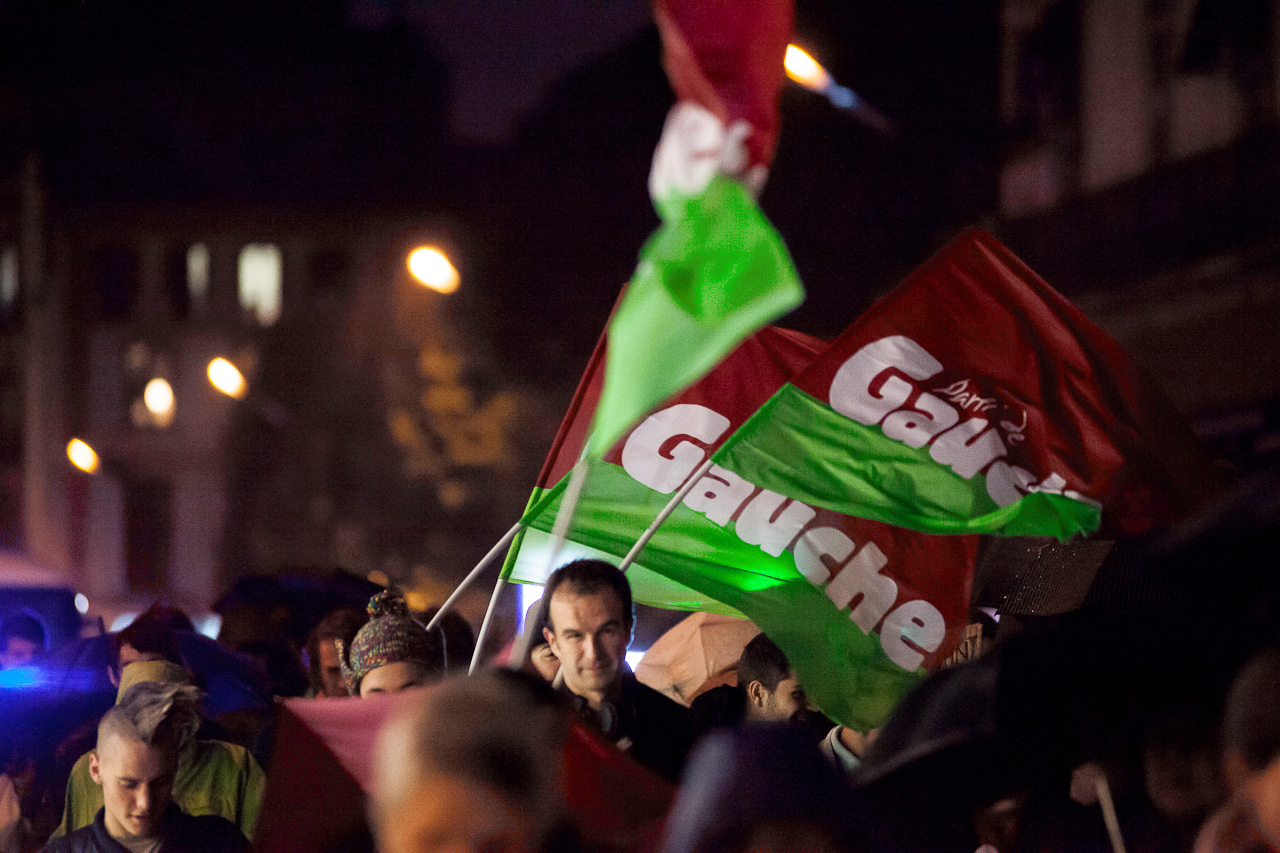
People march waving flags during a demonstration against expulsions of foreign students on 5 November 2013 in Toulouse.

It was founded in November 2008 by former Socialist senator Jean-Luc Mélenchon, deputy Marc Dolez, and other dissidents of the party together with the MARS movement (Mouvement pour une Alternative Républicaine et Sociale, "Movement for a Republican and Social Alternative").

They had left the PS five days earlier, in protest of the result of the Reims Congress vote on motions, where the leftist motion they supported won only 19%.

They were joined after by other members from the left of the Socialist Party, by people who hadn't been members of a political party before, and by dissidents from the Green Party following the deputy Martine Billard.

In 2010 the PG was accepted into the Party of the European Left.

In November 2013, the PG joined the international Boycott, Divestment and Sanctions (BDS) campaign against Israel.

Co-presidents and co-founders Mélenchon and Billard stepped down from office in 2014. Since its 2015 congress, the party is led by its coordinators and spokespersons Éric Coquerel and Danielle Simonnet.

On 2 July 2018 the party withdrew from the Party of the European Left, disagreeing with the presence of the Greek left-wing party Syriza in the alliance.

The party advocates eco-socialism as an alternative to capitalism, stating that:

Ecosocialism makes it possible to contribute in an exemplary way to the fight against the looming ecological catastrophe, through a major transformation planned over time in modes of production and consumption. This ecological planning is also the way to restore control of time to everyone and to include humanity and nature in a long time frame, necessary for the survival of our ecosystem. Our ecosocialism aims for human emancipation and involves breaking with the domination of the capitalist logic of maximum and endless accumulation. Thus, it fully introduces the ecological dimension and the fight against productivism into the history of socialism. Ecosocialism is thus "a socialism freed from productivist logic and a fiercely anti-capitalist ecology" (First Manifesto – 18 theses for ecosocialism).

La Meute, an investigative book published in 2025 by journalists Charlotte Belaïch and Olivier Pérou, reports alleged autocratic and cult‑like tendencies within the party—claims of intolerance to dissent and strong influence by Mélenchon and partner Sophia Chikirou. The movement's leaders pushed back, but critics and former insiders gave weight to the allegations.

In June 2025, it was reported by Le Monde that the Nouveau Front Populaire (New Popular Front) – an electoral alliance of LFI, Socialists, Greens, and Communists – is facing internal divisions, even as it attempts to unify the left.

== Elected officials ==
- Member of the European Parliament: Jean-Luc Mélenchon

Around 90 locally-elected officials (municipal, regional and general councillors), including two members of the Council of Paris, initially joined the party. This number has dropped since then.

== Popular support and electoral record ==
The PG has yet to run independently in an election, so support base is difficult to quantify.

=== National Assembly ===
National Assembly
Election	Leader	Votes (first round)		Seats		Result	Notes
Election	Leader	No.	%	No.	±	Result	Notes
2012	Jean-Luc Mélenchon	1,793,192	6.91	10 / 577	▼8	Opposition	

=== European Parliament ===
European Parliament
Election year	Number of votes	% of overall vote	# of seats won
2009	1,115,021	6.47%	1
2014	1,252,730	6.61%	1
