= Benoît Hamon =

French politician (born 1967)

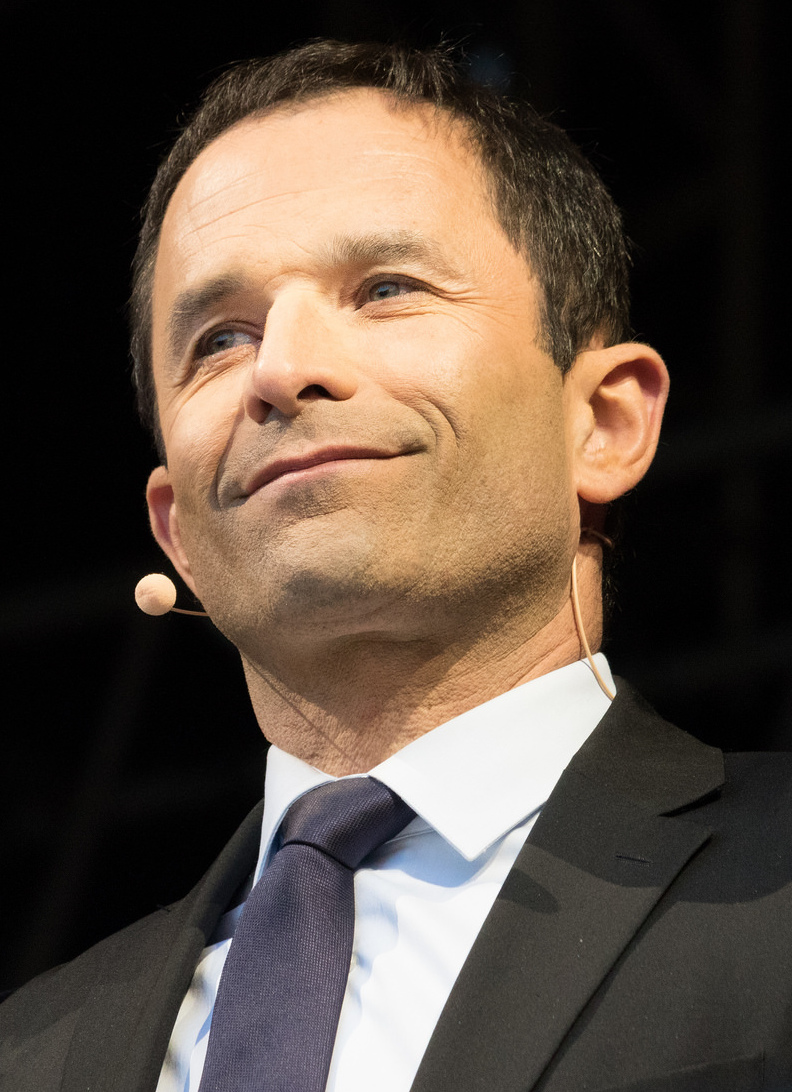
- Hamon in 2017

Minister of National Education
- In office 2 April 2014 – 25 August 2014
- Prime Minister: Manuel Valls
- Preceded by: Vincent Peillon
- Succeeded by: Najat Vallaud-Belkacem

Minister for the Social Economy
- In office 16 May 2012 – 31 March 2014
- Prime Minister: Jean-Marc Ayrault
- Preceded by: Position established
- Succeeded by: Valérie Fourneyron

Member of the National Assembly for Yvelines's 11th constituency
- In office 27 September 2014 – 20 June 2017
- Preceded by: Jean-Philippe Mallé
- Succeeded by: Nadia Haï
- In office 20 June 2012 – 21 July 2012
- Preceded by: Jean-Michel Fourgous
- Succeeded by: Jean-Philippe Mallé

Member of the European Parliament from East France
- In office 13 June 2004 – 7 June 2009

Personal details
- Born: 26 June 1967 (age 59) Saint-Renan, Finistère, France
- Party: Génération.s (2017–present)
- Other political affiliations: Socialist Party (1986–2017)
- Education: University of Western Brittany

Benoît Hamon (French: [bənwa amɔ̃]; born 26 June 1967) is a French politician known for his former role within the Socialist Party (PS) and Party of European Socialists (PES) and his political party Génération.s.

Hamon joined the Socialist Party in 1988 and by 1993 became the leader of the Young Socialist Movement, serving until 1995. In 2004, Hamon was elected MEP for East of France and during his time as MEP he ran for leadership of the Socialist Party, losing in the first round of the Reims Congress and endorsing the Eurosceptic option in the 2005 European Constitution referendum.

In 2012, Hamon was elected to the National Assembly in Yveline's 11th constituency, though he resigned after being appointed as junior minister for the Social Economy at the Ministry of the Economy, Finance, and External Trade by President François Hollande. Hamon was then appointed Minister of National Education in Manuel Valls' new government. He was removed from this position alongside Economy Minister Arnaud Montebourg when they both publicly opposed the government economic policy. He later returned to the National Assembly in September of the same year, running in his previous constituency. Hamon's stint in the National Assembly consisted of voting in line with a group labelled the Frondeurs, a socialist group opposed to the social-liberal politics of Francois Hollande and Manuel Valls.

In 2016, Hamon declared his intention to run in the Socialist Party primary for the 2017 presidential election. Being dubbed the "Jeremy Corbyn of the French-left" and "reinventing the French left", Hamon ran on ideas accused of being "far-out" such as legalising cannabis, taxing automation and introducing a universal basic income. Hamon eventually won in a run-off against former Prime Minister Manuel Valls and campaigned on similar ideals in the general election, though only gathering 6.36 per cent of votes. Shortly following his loss in the legislative election, Hamon left the Socialist Party in July 2017 to found his own political party called 1 July Movement, later renamed Génération.s.

After failing to win any seats in the 2019 European elections, Hamon said that he would step back to reflect on his and his movement's political future.

== Early life ==
Hamon was born 26 June 1967 in Saint-Renan, Finistère to an engineer father who worked for Naval Group in Brest and a secretary mother.

Hamon lived in Brest until 1980, moving with his parents to Dakar, Senegal where he attended a Cours Sainte Marie de Hann private school. Hamon credited growing up in Dakar as influential to the future of his life due to the religious and ethnic diversity of the region. Hamon returned to Brittany following his parents divorce in 1984 and eventually enrolled in the University of Western Brittany studying a degree in History where he joined the Young Socialist movement. Hamon lived in an apartment with current Socialist Party first secretary Olivier Faure during his academic life.

== Political career ==
=== Beginnings ===
After obtaining a degree in history at the University of Western Brittany in 1991, Hamon started his parliamentary career as an assistant to Socialist Party deputy Pierre Brana at the age of 24. Hamon had been taking part in student protests since the age of 19, starting his involvement in politics during a demonstration against Alain Devaquet's 1986-1987 education reform. Hamon joined the Socialist Party afterwards and became active in the Brest Socialist Party, being an advocate and supporter of Prime Minister Michel Rocard. Hamon also campaigned in support of the Maastricht Treaty in 1992.

Following the Socialist Party's loss in the 1993 legislative election, Michel Rocard, with the support of the socialist wing of the party, became the first secretary. The subsequent shake-up of the party's establishment led to the Socialist Party's secretary of communication, Manuel Valls', appointing Hamon within the administration of the Young Socialists. Hamon was a regional manager with supervision over Brittany, Nancy and Lyon. Hamon's leadership was inspired entirely by Rocard, independent from the then-leadership of the Young Socialists. Hamon was elected the leader of the Young Socialists in November 1993.

Hamon's leadership of the Young Socialists was marked by a closeness to student unions, which helped current Socialist Party politicians such as Pouria Amirshahi win elections for leadership positions within different student unions. Hamon also led an increase in membership from 500 members to 3,000, an expansion in terms of bases the Young Socialists have in universities and an increase of membership age from 25 to 29, mainly due to Hamon's own age of 26 at the time.

Following the revelation that then-president François Mitterrand and former high ranking Vichy member René Bousquet had a friendship, Hamon resigned as the leader of the Young Socialists. He was succeeded by Régis Juanico and became the national Representative of youth issues for the Socialist Party and then the advisor for youth policy in Lionel Jospin's 1995 presidential election.

Hamon ran for the National Assembly in 1997, in Morbihan's 2nd constituency's, losing in the second round. Hamon was then appointed as an advisor to Martine Aubry's Employment Ministry, mainly in charge of youth employment from 1997 to 1998 before becoming a senior advisor in 1998 to 2000. Hamon became a city councillor for Brétigny-sur-Orge in 2001, serving until 2008. He was also the director for strategic planning at Ipsos from 2001 to 2004.

=== European Parliament ===
In 2003, Hamon founded a caucus within the Socialist Party called the "New Socialist Party" with Arnaud Montebourg, Vincent Peillon, Julien Dray. The caucus was able to gather 17% of votes at the Dijon Congress, the second most behind Francois Hollande, who was eventually elected the first secretary of the Socialist Party. The caucus became the main Socialist Left affiliation within the party following an endorsement by former-first secretary Henri Emmanuelli. The "New Socialist Party" split after a motion proposed by the party at the Le Mans Congress, was rejected by leading member Arnaud Montebourg. The caucus finally collapsed in 2006 after the leadership of the caucus endorsed different candidates during the primary for the presidential election.

Hamon was Member of the European Parliament (MEP) for the East of France from 2004 to 2009, attached to the PES Group. He served as a member of the Committee of Economic and Monetary affairs, an alternative member of the Committee on Consumer Protection and the Vice-Chairman of the Delegate for the United States. Hamon was a campaigner for a "no" vote in the 2005 European Constitution referendum and was the national secretary for the PES Group, elected in 2005 and resigning in 2007 after the Socialist Party's support of the Lisbon Treaty despite promises made during the Le Mans Congress.

Hamon became a spokesman for the Socialist Party in the 2007 legislative elections.

After the candidacy for the First Secretary of the PS became a contest between Ségolène Royal and Martine Aubry, Hamon urged his supporters to vote for Aubry, who secured a narrow, contested majority.

On 16 May 2012, Hamon was appointed Junior Minister for the Social Economy at the French Ministry of the Economy, Finance, and External Trade by President François Hollande. Hamon was Minister of National Education from 2 April 2014 until 25 August 2014, resigning as a result of Hollande's abandonment of a socialist agenda. He was national secretary for Europe and spokesperson for the Socialist Party.

=== 2017 presidential campaign ===
Hamon announced his intention to seek the French presidency in August 2016. Critical of the social-liberal politics of Hollande and Prime Minister Manuel Valls, Hamon represented the left-wing and green side of the Socialist Party during the primary.

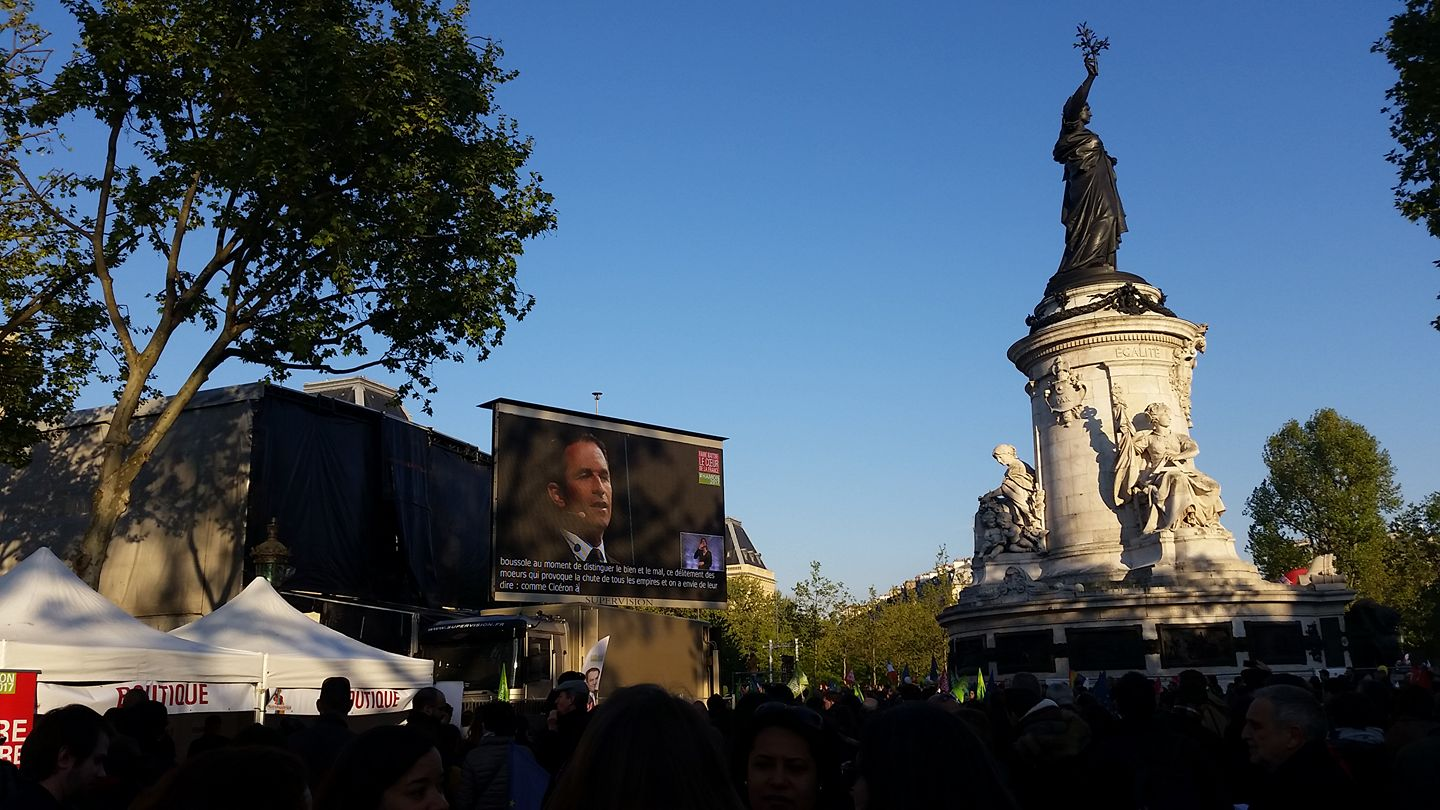
Political meeting of Benoît Hamon in Paris on 18 April 2017

Hamon wants to give all French citizens a basic income, believing that the availability of work will decrease due to automation. He supports a 35-hour workweek, and less if a worker chooses in exchange for state compensation, and supports the legalisation of cannabis and euthanasia. He also argues for sizeable investments in renewable energy, aiming for renewable sources to provide 50% of French energy by 2025, and wants to protect the "common goods" (water, air, biodiversity) in the Constitution. Hamon is also very critical of the neoliberal "myth of infinite economic growth", which he blames for "destroying the planet" and argues is a "quasi-religion" among politicians, saying: "There is an urgency to change now our way to produce and consume. [...] We can negotiate with bankers, but we can't negotiate with the planet".

Polling in January 2017 showed that his support had tripled and put him into serious contention for the nomination. On 22 January 2017, Hamon came in first in the first round of the primary, ahead of Valls. He secured the support of Arnaud Montebourg, who placed third, soon thereafter. In the runoff on 29 January, he won the Socialist Party nomination.

Hamon conceded defeat after the first round of the presidential election on 23 April, and immediately announced his support for Emmanuel Macron in the second round.

Addressing the 1 July Movement on 1 July 2017, Hamon said he was leaving the Socialist Party, but not socialism and called for the formation of local committees of the left to decide the movement's future.

== Personal life ==
Hamon is in a civil union, also known as PACS in France, with Gabrielle Guallar with whom he has two daughters. The couple met while Hamon was an MEP for East France.

Hamon has an estate in his home department of Finistère and an apartment in Hauts-de-Seine.

Political offices
| Preceded by Vincent Peillon | Minister of National Education; 2014 | Succeeded by Najat Vallaud-Belkacem |
Party political offices
| Preceded by François Hollande | Socialist Party nominee for President of France; 2017 | Succeeded by Anne Hidalgo |
