= Socialist Left (France) =

Socialist Left (French: Gauche socialiste, GS) was an organized caucus in the French Socialist Party. The GS made up part of the left wing of the party.

The GS was founded in 1988 to oppose the inclusion center-right politicians in the cabinet of president François Mitterrand. The founders of the faction included Jean-Luc Mélenchon former member of the Internationalist Communist Organisation and Julien Dray, former member of the Communist League.

As part of the internal turmoil that followed the Socialist Party's first-round defeat in the 2002 presidential election, the GS began to disintegrate. Mélenchon left the group and formed the Nouveau Monde ("New World") caucus. Dray formed a new current that sought to reconstitute the party, Pour un Nouveau Parti Socialiste, but he later abandoned the idea and became an adviser to 2007 presidential candidate Ségolène Royal.
