= Le Mans Congress =

The Le Mans Congress was the twenty-first national congress of the French Socialist Party (Parti socialiste or PS). It took place from November 18 to 20, 2005.

The objective of the Congress was to solve internal divisions created by the French referendum on the European Constitution and designate a new leadership at all levels.

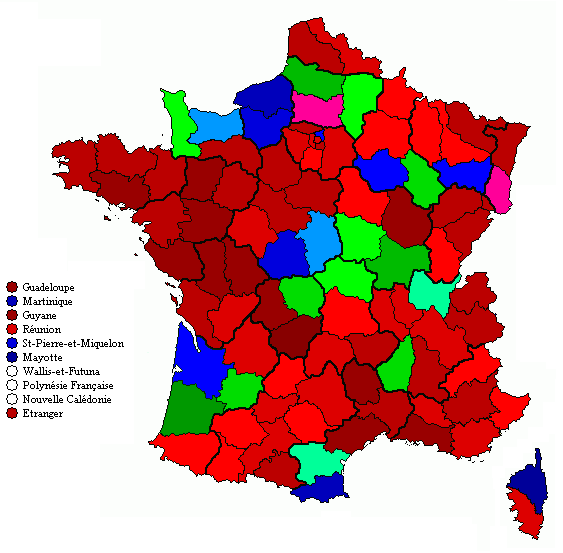
Results by departmental federation

== Motions ==
Five motions were presented to be voted upon by members:

- For a liberal socialism: Truth and Action (Pour un socialisme libéral : vérité et action): Social liberal current led by Jean-Marie Bockel, PS mayor of Mulhouse.
- Rally the Left (Rassembler à gauche): Left-wing motion led Laurent Fabius, and supported by Jean-Luc Mélenchon and Marie-Noëlle Lienemann. This was the first time since the 1990 Rennes Congress that Fabius led a motion.
- Socialists, for success on the left: Will, Truth, Unity (Socialistes, pour réussir à gauche : Volonté - Vérité - Unité): Majority motion led by François Hollande, supported by the party elites: Martine Aubry, Dominique Strauss-Kahn, and Bertrand Delanoë.
- New Socialist Party-For a Socialist Alternative (Nouveau Parti Socialiste-Pour une Alternative Socialiste): Left-wing motion supported by Vincent Peillon, Arnaud Montebourg, Benoît Hamon, Michel Vauzelle, Henri Emmanuelli.
- Utopia: Alterglobalization current led by Franck Pupunat.

== Results ==
Popular vote
| Motion 1 (Hollande) | 53.63% |
| Motion 5 (NPS) | 23.54% |
| Motion 2 (Fabius) | 21.17% |
| Motion 3 (Utopia) | 1.02% |
| Motion 4 (Bockel) | 0.64% |

Hollande was re-elected as First Secretary unopposed. He won 76.96% of the votes.
