= List of deputies of the 14th National Assembly of France =

This article lists the deputies who served in the 14th legislature of the French Fifth Republic, elected in the 2012 legislative elections, elected in by-elections, or alternates succeeding deputies.

== Parliamentary groups ==
Composition of the National Assembly as of 12 May 2017
Parliamentary group		Members	President
SER	Socialist group, associated	284	Olivier Faure
LR	The Republicans	199	Christian Jacob
UDI	Union of Democrats and Independent	27	Philippe Vigier
RRDP	Radical, Republican, Democratic and Progressive	18	Roger-Gérard Schwartzenberg
GDR	Democratic and Republican Left	15	André Chassaigne
NI	Non-inscrits	26	–
Vacant		8	–

== List of deputies ==
Constituency	Name	Photo	Party	Birth	Place	Region	Country
Ain's 1st constituency	Xavier Breton		UMP	Nov 25, 1962	Darney	Duchy of Lorraine	France
Ain's 2nd constituency	Charles de la Verpillière		UMP	May 31, 1954	Bourg-en-Bresse	Rhône-Alpes	France
Ain's 3rd constituency	Étienne Blanc		UMP	Aug 29, 1954	Givors	Rhône-Alpes	France
Ain's 4th constituency	Michel Voisin		UMP	Oct 6, 1944	Replonges	Rhône-Alpes	France
Ain's 5th constituency	Damien Abad		UMP	Apr 5, 1980	Nîmes	Languedoc-Roussillon	France
Aisne's 1st constituency	René Dosière		DVG	Aug 3, 1941	Origny-Sainte-Benoite	Picardy	France
Aisne's 2nd constituency	Xavier Bertrand		UMP	Mar 21, 1965	Châlons-en-Champagne	Champagne-Ardenne	France
Aisne's 3rd constituency	Jean-Louis Bricout		PS	Dec 27, 1957	Busigny	Nord-Pas-de-Calais	France
Aisne's 4th constituency	Marie-Françoise Bechtel		MRC	Mar 19, 1946	Coarraze	Aquitaine	France
Aisne's 5th constituency	Jacques Krabal		PRG	Apr 10, 1948	Épieds	Picardy	France
Allier's 1st constituency	Guy Chambefort		PS	Oct 19, 1944	Saint-Étienne	Rhône-Alpes	France
Allier's 2nd constituency	Bernard Lesterlin		PS	Sep 18, 1949	Vienne	Rhône-Alpes	France
Allier's 3rd constituency	Gérard Charasse		PRG	Mar 26, 1944	Le Vernet	Auvergne	France
Alpes de Haute Provence's 1st constituency	Gilbert Sauvan		PS	Jul 15, 1956	Peyroules	Provence-Alpes-Côte d'Azur	France
Alpes de Haute Provence's 2nd constituency	Christophe Castaner		PS	Jan 3, 1966	Ollioules	Provence-Alpes-Côte d'Azur	France
Hautes-Alpes's 1st constituency	Karine Berger		PS	Mar 11, 1973	Limoges	Limousin	France
Hautes-Alpes's 2nd constituency	Joël Giraud		PRG	Oct 14, 1959	Gap	Provence-Alpes-Côte d'Azur	France
Alpes Maritimes's 1st constituency	Éric Ciotti		UMP	Sep 28, 1965	Nice	Provence-Alpes-Côte d'Azur	France
Alpes Maritimes's 2nd constituency	Charles-Ange Ginésy		UMP	May 14, 1956	Nice	Provence-Alpes-Côte d'Azur	France
Alpes Maritimes's 3rd constituency	Rudy Salles		UDI	Jul 30, 1954	Nice	Provence-Alpes-Côte d'Azur	France
Alpes Maritimes's 4th constituency	Jean-Claude Guibal		UMP	Jan 13, 1941	Ajaccio	Corsica	France
Alpes Maritimes's 5th constituency	Christian Estrosi		UMP	Jul 1, 1955	Nice	Provence-Alpes-Côte d'Azur	France
Alpes Maritimes's 6th constituency	Lionnel Luca		UMP	Dec 19, 1954	Boulogne-Billancourt	Île-de-France	France
Alpes Maritimes's 7th constituency	Jean Leonetti		PR	Jul 9, 1948	Marseille	Provence-Alpes-Côte d'Azur	France
Alpes Maritimes's 8th constituency	Bernard Brochand		UMP	Jun 5, 1938	Nice	Provence-Alpes-Côte d'Azur	France
Alpes Maritimes's 9th constituency	Michèle Tabarot		UMP	Oct 13, 1962	Alicante	Spain	Spain
Ardèche's 1st constituency	Pascal Terrasse		PS	Oct 26, 1964	Bagnols-sur-Cèze	Languedoc-Roussillon	France
Ardèche's 2nd constituency	Olivier Dussopt		PS	Aug 16, 1978	Annonay	Rhône-Alpes	France
Ardèche's 3rd constituency	Sabine Buis		PS	Sep 15, 1970	Aubenas	Rhône-Alpes	France
Ardennes's 1st constituency	Bérengère Poletti		UMP	Oct 14, 1959	Biencourt-sur-Orge	Duchy of Lorraine	France
Ardennes's 2nd constituency	Christophe Léonard		PS	Jan 31, 1971	Charleville-Mézières	Duchy of Lorraine	France
Ardennes's 3rd constituency	Jean-Luc Warsmann		UMP	Oct 22, 1965	Villers-Semeuse	Duchy of Lorraine	France
Ariège's 1st constituency	Frédérique Massat		PS	Jan 14, 1964	Toulouse	Midi-Pyrénées	France
Ariège's 2nd constituency	Alain Fauré		PS	Oct 1, 1962	Pamiers	Midi-Pyrénées	France
Aube's 1st constituency	Nicolas Dhuicq		UMP	Nov 29, 1960	Paris	Île-de-France	France
Aube's 2nd constituency	Jean-Claude Mathis		UMP	Aug 15, 1939	Bouzonville	Duchy of Lorraine	France
Aube's 3rd constituency	François Baroin		UMP	Jun 21, 1965	Paris	Île-de-France	France
Aude's 1st constituency	Jean-Claude Perez		PS	Mar 31, 1964	Carcassonne	Languedoc-Roussillon	France
Aude's 2nd constituency	Marie-Hélène Fabre		PS	Jul 27, 1951	Talence	Aquitaine	France
Aude's 3rd constituency	Jean-Paul Dupré		PS	Feb 5, 1944	Davejean	Languedoc-Roussillon	France
Aveyron's 1st constituency	Yves Censi		UMP	Feb 8, 1964	Rodez	Midi-Pyrénées	France
Aveyron's 2nd constituency	Marie-Lou Marcel		PS	Aug 21, 1953	Estadens	Midi-Pyrénées	France
Aveyron's 3rd constituency	Alain Marc		PR	Jan 29, 1957	Paris	Île-de-France	France
Bouches du Rhône's 1st constituency	Valérie Boyer		UMP	Jun 11, 1962	Bourges	Centre-Val de Loire	France
Bouches du Rhône's 2nd constituency	Dominique Tian		UMP	Dec 14, 1959	Marseille	Provence-Alpes-Côte d'Azur	France
Bouches du Rhône's 3rd constituency	Sylvie Andrieux		DVG	Dec 15, 1961	Marseille	Provence-Alpes-Côte d'Azur	France
Bouches du Rhône's 4th constituency	Patrick Mennucci		PS	Apr 8, 1955	Marseille	Provence-Alpes-Côte d'Azur	France
Bouches du Rhône's 5th constituency	Marie-Arlette Carlotti		PS	Jan 21, 1952	Béziers	France	France
Bouches du Rhône's 6th constituency	Guy Teissier		UMP	Apr 4, 1945	Marseille	Provence-Alpes-Côte d'Azur	France
Bouches du Rhône's 7th constituency	Henri Jibrayel		PS	Sep 18, 1951	Marseille	Provence-Alpes-Côte d'Azur	France
Bouches du Rhône's 8th constituency	Jean-Pierre Maggi		PS	Jul 27, 1944	Marseille	Provence-Alpes-Côte d'Azur	France
Bouches du Rhône's 9th constituency	Bernard Deflesselles		UMP	Oct 16, 1953	Paris	Île-de-France	France
Bouches du Rhône's 10th constituency	François-Michel Lambert		EÉLV	Aug 24, 1966	Havana	Cuba	Cuba
Bouches du Rhône's 11th constituency	Christian Kert		UMP	Jul 25, 1946	Salon-de-Provence	Provence-Alpes-Côte d'Azur	France
Bouches du Rhône's 12th constituency	Vincent Burroni		PS	Oct 1, 1947	Châteauneuf-les-Martigues	Provence-Alpes-Côte d'Azur	France
Bouches du Rhône's 13th constituency	Gaby Charroux		FG	Jun 25, 1942	Alger	Algeria	Algeria
Bouches du Rhône's 14th constituency	Jean-David Ciot		PS	May 1, 1967	Rosendaël	Nord-Pas-de-Calais	France
Bouches du Rhône's 15th constituency	Bernard Reynès		UMP	Oct 18, 1953	Meknès	Morocco	Morocco
Bouches du Rhône's 16th constituency	Michel Vauzelle		PS	Aug 15, 1944	Montélimar	Rhône-Alpes	France
Calvados's 1st constituency	Philippe Duron		PS	Jun 19, 1947	Antony	Île-de-France	France
Calvados's 2nd constituency	Laurence Dumont		PS	Jun 2, 1958	Vincennes	Île-de-France	France
Calvados's 3rd constituency	Clotilde Valter		PS	Jun 24, 1962	Béthune	Nord-Pas-de-Calais	France
Calvados's 4th constituency	Nicole Ameline		UMP	Jul 4, 1952	Saint-Vaast-en-Auge	Lower Normandy	France
Calvados's 5th constituency	Isabelle Attard		EÉLV	Nov 14, 1969	Vendôme	Centre-Val de Loire	France
Calvados's 6th constituency	Alain Tourret		PRG	Dec 25, 1947	Boppard	Germany	Germany
Cantal's 1st constituency	Alain Calmette		PS	Nov 30, 1957	Aurillac	Auvergne	France
Cantal's 2nd constituency	Alain Marleix		UMP	Jan 2, 1946	Paris	Île-de-France	France
Charente's 1st constituency	Martine Pinville		PS	Oct 23, 1958	Angoulême	Poitou-Charentes	France
Charente's 2nd constituency	Marie-Line Reynaud		PS	Jul 17, 1954	Barbezieux	Poitou-Charentes	France
Charente's 3rd constituency	Jérôme Lambert		PS	Jun 7, 1957	Vincennes	Île-de-France	France
Charente-Maritime's 1st constituency	Olivier Falorni		DVG	Mar 27, 1972	Rochefort	Poitou-Charentes	France
Charente-Maritime's 2nd constituency	Suzanne Tallard		PS	Jun 19, 1943	La Rochelle	Poitou-Charentes	France
Charente-Maritime's 3rd constituency	Catherine Quéré		PS	Mar 16, 1948	Angoulême	Poitou-Charentes	France
Charente-Maritime's 4th constituency	Dominique Bussereau		UMP	Jul 13, 1952	Tours	Centre-Val de Loire	France
Charente-Maritime's 5th constituency	Didier Quentin		UMP	Dec 23, 1946	Royan	Poitou-Charentes	France
Cher's 1st constituency	Yves Fromion		UMP	Sep 15, 1941	Vorly	Centre-Val de Loire	France
Cher's 2nd constituency	Nicolas Sansu		FG	Jun 17, 1968	Vierzon	Centre-Val de Loire	France
Cher's 3rd constituency	Yann Galut		PS	Mar 14, 1966	Antony	Île-de-France	France
Corrèze's 1st constituency	Sophie Dessus		PS	Sep 24, 1955	Suresnes	Île-de-France	France
Corrèze's 2nd constituency	Philippe Nauche		PS	Jul 15, 1957	Brive-la-Gaillarde	Limousin	France
Corse-du-Sud's 1st constituency	Laurent Marcangeli		UMP	Dec 10, 1980	Ajaccio	Corsica	France
Corse-du-Sud's 2nd constituency	Camille de Rocca Serra		UMP	May 21, 1954	Porto-Vecchio	Corsica	France
Haute-Corse's 1st constituency	Sauveur Gandolfi-Scheit		UMP	Jan 19, 1947	Bastia	Corsica	France
Haute-Corse's 2nd constituency	Paul Giacobbi		PRG	Jun 4, 1957	Courbevoie	Île-de-France	France
Côte-d'Or's 1st constituency	Laurent Grandguillaume		PS	Jan 20, 1978	Besançon	Franche-Comté	France
Côte-d'Or's 2nd constituency	Rémi Delatte		UMP	Jun 9, 1956	Dijon	Burgundy	France
Côte-d'Or's 3rd constituency	Kheira Bouziane		PS	Aug 23, 1953	Oran	Algeria	Algeria
Côte-d'Or's 4th constituency	François Sauvadet		UDI	Apr 20, 1953	Dijon	Burgundy	France
Côte-d'Or's 5th constituency	Alain Suguenot		UMP	Sep 17, 1951	Troyes	Champagne-Ardenne	France
Côtes-d'Armor's 1st constituency	Michel Lesage		PS	Jun 2, 1952	Cherbourg	Lower Normandy	France
Côtes-d'Armor's 2nd constituency	Viviane Le Dissez		PS	Mar 22, 1959	Tréguier	Brittany	France
Côtes-d'Armor's 3rd constituency	Marc Le Fur		UMP	Nov 28, 1956	Dakar	Senegal	Senegal
Côtes-d'Armor's 4th constituency	Annie Le Houérou		DVG	Mar 31, 1960	Plougonver	Brittany	France
Côtes-d'Armor's 5th constituency	Corinne Erhel		PS	Feb 3, 1967	Quimper	Brittany	France
Creuse's 1st constituency	Michel Vergnier		PS	Nov 25, 1946	Ennery	Duchy of Lorraine	France
Dordogne's 1st constituency	Pascal Deguilhem		PS	Feb 9, 1956	Brouchaud	Aquitaine	France
Dordogne's 2nd constituency	Brigitte Allain		EÉLV	Apr 23, 1956	Bouniagues	Aquitaine	France
Dordogne's 3rd constituency	Colette Langlade		PS	Jun 20, 1956	Sorges	Aquitaine	France
Dordogne's 4th constituency	Germinal Peiro		PS	Sep 15, 1953	Lézignan-Corbières	Languedoc-Roussillon	France
Doubs's 1st constituency	Barbara Romagnan		PS	Apr 25, 1974	Annecy	Rhône-Alpes	France
Doubs's 2nd constituency	Éric Alauzet		EÉLV	Jun 7, 1958	Nancy	Duchy of Lorraine	France
Doubs's 3rd constituency	Marcel Bonnot		UMP	May 24, 1946	Rémondans-Vaivre	Franche-Comté	France
Doubs's 4th constituency	Pierre Moscovici		PS	Sep 16, 1957	Paris	Île-de-France	France
Doubs's 5th constituency	Annie Genevard		UMP	Sep 7, 1956	Audincourt	Franche-Comté	France
Drôme's 1st constituency	Patrick Labaune		UMP	Jun 13, 1951	Paris	Île-de-France	France
Drôme's 2nd constituency	Franck Reynier		UDI	Oct 20, 1965	Montélimar	Rhône-Alpes	France
Drôme's 3rd constituency	Hervé Mariton		UMP	Nov 5, 1958	Alger	Algeria	Algeria
Drôme's 4th constituency	Nathalie Nieson		PS	Mar 26, 1969	Lyon	Rhône-Alpes	France
Eure's 1st constituency	Bruno Le Maire		UMP	Apr 15, 1969	Neuilly-sur-Seine	Île-de-France	France
Eure's 2nd constituency	Jean-Louis Destans		PS	Mar 3, 1951	Libourne	Aquitaine	France
Eure's 3rd constituency	Hervé Morin		UDI	Aug 17, 1961	Pont-Audemer	Lower Normandy	France
Eure's 4th constituency	François Loncle		PS	Oct 21, 1941	Enghien-les-Bains	Île-de-France	France
Eure's 5th constituency	Franck Gilard		UMP	Nov 1, 1950	Riaillé	Pays de la Loire	France
Eure-et-Loir's 1st constituency	Jean-Pierre Gorges		UMP	Aug 3, 1953	Gonesse	Île-de-France	France
Eure-et-Loir's 2nd constituency	Olivier Marleix		UMP	Feb 6, 1971	Boulogne-Billancourt	Île-de-France	France
Eure-et-Loir's 3rd constituency	Laure de La Raudière		UMP	Feb 12, 1965	Neuilly-sur-Seine	Île-de-France	France
Eure-et-Loir's 4th constituency	Philippe Vigier		UDI	Feb 3, 1958	Valence	Rhône-Alpes	France
Finistère's 1st constituency	Jean-Jacques Urvoas		PS	Sep 19, 1959	Brest	Brittany	France
Finistère's 2nd constituency	Patricia Adam		PS	Apr 15, 1953	Saint-Cloud	Île-de-France	France
Finistère's 3rd constituency	Jean-Luc Bleunven		DVG	Dec 20, 1958	Plabennec	Brittany	France
Finistère's 4th constituency	Gwenegan Bui		PS	Jul 27, 1974	Vitry-sur-Seine	Île-de-France	France
Finistère's 5th constituency	Chantal Guittet		PS	Mar 12, 1955	Oran	Algeria	Algeria
Finistère's 6th constituency	Richard Ferrand		PS	Jul 1, 1962	Rodez	Midi-Pyrénées	France
Finistère's 7th constituency	Annick Le Loch		PS	Nov 4, 1954	Pont-l'Abbé	Brittany	France
Finistère's 8th constituency	Gilbert Le Bris		PS	Mar 3, 1949	Concarneau	Brittany	France
Gard's 1st constituency	Françoise Dumas		PS	Apr 12, 1960	Alès	Languedoc-Roussillon	France
Gard's 2nd constituency	Gilbert Collard		FN	Feb 3, 1948	Marseille	Provence-Alpes-Côte d'Azur	France
Gard's 3rd constituency	Patrice Prat		PS	Nov 28, 1965	Bagnols-sur-Cèze	Languedoc-Roussillon	France
Gard's 4th constituency	Fabrice Verdier		PS	Dec 16, 1968	Bagnols-sur-Cèze	Languedoc-Roussillon	France
Gard's 5th constituency	William Dumas		PS	Jan 23, 1942	Nîmes	Languedoc-Roussillon	France
Gard's 6th constituency	Christophe Cavard		EÉLV	Feb 19, 1970	Die	Rhône-Alpes	France
Haute-Garonne's 1st constituency	Catherine Lemorton		PS	Jun 20, 1961	Troyes	Champagne-Ardenne	France
Haute-Garonne's 2nd constituency	Gérard Bapt		PS	Feb 4, 1946	Saint-Étienne	Rhône-Alpes	France
Haute-Garonne's 3rd constituency	Laurence Arribagé		UMP	May 25, 1970	Albi	Midi-Pyrénées	France
Haute-Garonne's 4th constituency	Martine Martinel		PS	Sep 26, 1953	Toulouse	Midi-Pyrénées	France
Haute-Garonne's 5th constituency	Françoise Imbert		PS	Sep 16, 1947	Verdun-sur-Garonne	Midi-Pyrénées	France
Haute-Garonne's 6th constituency	Monique Iborra		PS	Mar 8, 1945	El Harrach	Algeria	Algeria
Haute-Garonne's 7th constituency	Patrick Lemasle		PS	May 18, 1952	Saint-Hilaire-du-Harcouët	Lower Normandy	France
Haute-Garonne's 8th constituency	Carole Delga		PS	Aug 19, 1971	Toulouse	Midi-Pyrénées	France
Haute-Garonne's 9th constituency	Christophe Borgel		PS	Sep 3, 1963	Poitiers	Poitou-Charentes	France
Haute-Garonne's 10th constituency	Émilienne Poumirol		PS	Jul 25, 1950	Varilhes	Midi-Pyrénées	France
Gers's 1st constituency	Philippe Martin		PS	Nov 22, 1953	La Garenne-Colombes	Île-de-France	France
Gers's 2nd constituency	Gisèle Biémouret		PS	Jun 16, 1952	Fleurance	Midi-Pyrénées	France
Gironde's 1st constituency	Sandrine Doucet		PS	Sep 10, 1959	Talence	Aquitaine	France
Gironde's 2nd constituency	Michèle Delaunay		PS	Jan 8, 1947	Clermont-Ferrand	Auvergne	France
Gironde's 3rd constituency	Noël Mamère		EÉLV	Dec 25, 1948	Libourne	Aquitaine	France
Gironde's 4th constituency	Conchita Lacuey		PS	Sep 30, 1943	Bordeaux	Aquitaine	France
Gironde's 5th constituency	Pascale Got		PS	Apr 1, 1961	Royan	Poitou-Charentes	France
Gironde's 6th constituency	Marie Récalde		PS	Mar 12, 1965	Langon	Aquitaine	France
Gironde's 7th constituency	Alain Rousset		PS	Feb 16, 1951	Chazelles-sur-Lyon	Rhône-Alpes	France
Gironde's 8th constituency	Yves Foulon		UMP	Oct 10, 1958	Arcachon	Aquitaine	France
Gironde's 9th constituency	Gilles Savary		PS	Dec 6, 1954	Oradour-sur-Vayres	Limousin	France
Gironde's 10th constituency	Florent Boudié		PS	Sep 22, 1973	Sainte-Foy-la-Grande	Aquitaine	France
Gironde's 11th constituency	Philippe Plisson		PS	Jan 12, 1951	Saint-Caprais-de-Blaye	Aquitaine	France
Gironde's 12th constituency	Martine Faure		PS	Sep 30, 1948	Langon	Aquitaine	France
Hérault's 1st constituency	Jean-Louis Roumégas		EÉLV	Jun 6, 1962	Alger	Algeria	Algeria
Hérault's 2nd constituency	Anne-Yvonne Le Dain		PS	Sep 1, 1955	Versailles	Île-de-France	France
Hérault's 3rd constituency	Fanny Dombre-Coste		PS	Dec 26, 1956	Sainte-Adresse	Upper Normandy	France
Hérault's 4th constituency	Frédéric Roig		PS	May 18, 1969	Montpellier	Languedoc-Roussillon	France
Hérault's 5th constituency	Kléber Mesquida		PS	Aug 3, 1945	Douaouda	Algeria	Algeria
Hérault's 6th constituency	Élie Aboud		UMP	Oct 12, 1959	Beyrouth	Lebanon	Lebanon
Hérault's 7th constituency	Sébastien Denaja		PS	Jan 14, 1979	Montpellier	Languedoc-Roussillon	France
Hérault's 8th constituency	Christian Assaf		PS	Sep 1, 1972	Nîmes	Languedoc-Roussillon	France
Hérault's 9th constituency	Patrick Vignal		PS	Jan 22, 1958	Montpellier	Languedoc-Roussillon	France
Ille-et-Vilaine's 1st constituency	Marie-Anne Chapdelaine		PS	Mar 20, 1962	Revin	Champagne-Ardenne	France
Ille-et-Vilaine's 2nd constituency	Nathalie Appéré		PS	Jul 8, 1975	Plœmeur	Brittany	France
Ille-et-Vilaine's 3rd constituency	François André		PS	Jul 19, 1967	Pontivy	Brittany	France
Ille-et-Vilaine's 4th constituency	Jean-René Marsac		PS	Apr 21, 1954	Béganne	Brittany	France
Ille-et-Vilaine's 5th constituency	Isabelle Le Callennec		UMP	Oct 14, 1966	Nantes	Pays de la Loire	France
Ille-et-Vilaine's 6th constituency	Thierry Benoit		UDI	Sep 13, 1966	Fougères	Brittany	France
Ille-et-Vilaine's 7th constituency	Gilles Lurton		DVD	Jul 6, 1963	Saint-Malo	Brittany	France
Ille-et-Vilaine's 8th constituency	Marcel Rogemont		PS	Jan 3, 1948	Coye-la-Forêt	Picardy	France
Indre's 1st constituency	Jean-Paul Chanteguet		PS	Dec 9, 1949	Le Blanc	Centre-Val de Loire	France
Indre's 2nd constituency	Isabelle Bruneau		PS	Mar 26, 1966	Châteauroux	Centre-Val de Loire	France
Indre-et-Loire's 1st constituency	Jean-Patrick Gille		PS	Jan 28, 1962	Écommoy	Pays de la Loire	France
Indre-et-Loire's 2nd constituency	Claude Greff		UMP	Jun 2, 1954	Briey	Duchy of Lorraine	France
Indre-et-Loire's 3rd constituency	Jean-Marie Beffara		PS	Oct 13, 1962	Châteauroux	Centre-Val de Loire	France
Indre-et-Loire's 4th constituency	Laurent Baumel		PS	Aug 13, 1965	Charleville-Mézières	Champagne-Ardenne	France
Indre-et-Loire's 5th constituency	Philippe Briand		UMP	Oct 26, 1960	Tours	Centre-Val de Loire	France
Isère's 1st constituency	Olivier Véran		PS	Apr 22, 1980	Saint-Martin-d'Hères	Rhône-Alpes	France
Isère's 2nd constituency	Michel Issindou		PS	Jul 12, 1952	Cahors	Midi-Pyrénées	France
Isère's 3rd constituency	Michel Destot		PS	Sep 2, 1946	Malo-les-Bains	Nord-Pas-de-Calais	France
Isère's 4th constituency	Marie-Noëlle Battistel		PS	Aug 20, 1956	Grenoble	Rhône-Alpes	France
Isère's 5th constituency	François Brottes		PS	Mar 31, 1956	Valence	Rhône-Alpes	France
Isère's 6th constituency	Alain Moyne-Bressand		UMP	Jul 30, 1945	Jallieu	Rhône-Alpes	France
Isère's 7th constituency	Jean-Pierre Barbier		UMP	Nov 11, 1960	Bron	Rhône-Alpes	France
Isère's 8th constituency	Erwann Binet		PS	Jul 30, 1972	Brest	Brittany	France
Isère's 9th constituency	Michèle Bonneton		EÉLV	Jul 15, 1947	Tullins	Rhône-Alpes	France
Isère's 10th constituency	Joëlle Huillier		PS	Oct 6, 1948	Lyon	Rhône-Alpes	France
Jura's 1st constituency	Jacques Pélissard		UMP	Mar 20, 1946	Lyon	Rhône-Alpes	France
Jura's 2nd constituency	Marie-Christine Dalloz		UMP	Jan 10, 1958	Saint-Claude	Franche-Comté	France
Jura's 3rd constituency	Jean-Marie Sermier		UMP	Mar 5, 1961	Nozeroy	Franche-Comté	France
Landes's 1st constituency	Alain Vidalies		PS	Mar 17, 1951	Grenade-sur-l'Adour	Aquitaine	France
Landes's 2nd constituency	Jean-Pierre Dufau		PS	Jul 5, 1943	Capbreton	Aquitaine	France
Landes's 3rd constituency	Henri Emmanuelli		PS	May 31, 1945	Eaux-Bonnes	Aquitaine	France
Loir-et-Cher's 1st constituency	Denys Robiliard		PS	Jul 22, 1960	Rouen	Upper Normandy	France
Loir-et-Cher's 2nd constituency	Patrice Martin-Lalande		UMP	Dec 2, 1947	Grenoble	Rhône-Alpes	France
Loir-et-Cher's 3rd constituency	Maurice Leroy		UDI	Feb 2, 1959	Paris	Île-de-France	France
Loire's 1st constituency	Régis Juanico		PS	Feb 5, 1972	Saint-Rémy	Burgundy	France
Loire's 2nd constituency	Jean-Louis Gagnaire		PS	Apr 29, 1956	Saint-Étienne	Rhône-Alpes	France
Loire's 3rd constituency	François Rochebloine		UDI	Oct 31, 1945	Saint-Chamond	Rhône-Alpes	France
Loire's 4th constituency	Dino Cinieri		PCD	Jul 9, 1955	Firminy	Rhône-Alpes	France
Loire's 5th constituency	Yves Nicolin		UMP	Mar 5, 1963	Le Coteau	Rhône-Alpes	France
Loire's 6th constituency	Paul Salen		UMP	Jun 17, 1949	Veauche	Rhône-Alpes	France
Haute-Loire's 1st constituency	Laurent Wauquiez		UMP	Apr 12, 1975	Lyon	Rhône-Alpes	France
Haute-Loire's 2nd constituency	Jean-Pierre Vigier		DVD	Oct 22, 1969	Brioude	Auvergne	France
Loire-Atlantique's 1st constituency	François de Rugy		EÉLV	Dec 6, 1973	Nantes	Pays de la Loire	France
Loire-Atlantique's 2nd constituency	Marie-Françoise Clergeau		PS	May 2, 1948	Nantes	Pays de la Loire	France
Loire-Atlantique's 3rd constituency	Jean-Marc Ayrault		PS	Jan 25, 1950	Maulévrier	Pays de la Loire	France
Loire-Atlantique's 4th constituency	Dominique Raimbourg		PS	Apr 28, 1950	Boulogne-Billancourt	Île-de-France	France
Loire-Atlantique's 5th constituency	Michel Ménard		PS	May 20, 1961	Saint-Berthevin-la-Tannière	Pays de la Loire	France
Loire-Atlantique's 6th constituency	Yves Daniel		PS	Jul 31, 1954	Mouais	Pays de la Loire	France
Loire-Atlantique's 7th constituency	Christophe Priou		UMP	May 2, 1958	Nantes	Pays de la Loire	France
Loire-Atlantique's 8th constituency	Marie-Odile Bouillé		PS	Oct 13, 1950	Nantes	Pays de la Loire	France
Loire-Atlantique's 9th constituency	Monique Rabin		PS	Jul 2, 1954	Laval	Pays de la Loire	France
Loire-Atlantique's 10th constituency	Sophie Errante		PS	Jul 22, 1971	Nantes	Pays de la Loire	France
Loiret's 1st constituency	Olivier Carré		UMP	Mar 16, 1961	Orléans	Centre-Val de Loire	France
Loiret's 2nd constituency	Serge Grouard		UMP	Mar 19, 1959	Paris	Île-de-France	France
Loiret's 3rd constituency	Claude de Ganay		PR	Sep 5, 1953	Paris	Île-de-France	France
Loiret's 4th constituency	Jean-Pierre Door		UMP	Apr 1, 1942	Sully-sur-Loire	Centre-Val de Loire	France
Loiret's 5th constituency	Marianne Dubois		UMP	Dec 17, 1957	Corbeil-Essonnes	Île-de-France	France
Loiret's 6th constituency	Valérie Corre		PS	May 17, 1967	Antony	Île-de-France	France
Lot's 1st constituency	Dominique Orliac		PRG	Mar 15, 1952	Palaiseau	Île-de-France	France
Lot's 2nd constituency	Jean Launay		PS	Jul 24, 1952	Avesnes-sur-Helpe	Nord-Pas-de-Calais	France
Lot-et-Garonne's 1st constituency	Lucette Lousteau		PS	Dec 20, 1948	Oran	Algeria	Algeria
Lot-et-Garonne's 2nd constituency	Matthias Fekl		PS	Oct 4, 1977	Frankfurt	Germany	Germany
Lot-et-Garonne's 3rd constituency	Jean-Louis Costes		UMP	Aug 23, 1963	Agen	Aquitaine	France
Lozère's 1st constituency	Pierre Morel-A-L'Huissier		UMP	Dec 21, 1958	Strasbourg	Alsace	France
Maine-et-Loire's 1st constituency	Luc Belot		PS	Sep 6, 1974	Niort	Poitou-Charentes	France
Maine-et-Loire's 2nd constituency	Marc Goua		PS	Mar 3, 1940	Le Plessis-Macé	Pays de la Loire	France
Maine-et-Loire's 3rd constituency	Jean-Charles Taugourdeau		UMP	Jul 17, 1953	Dreux	Centre-Val de Loire	France
Maine-et-Loire's 4th constituency	Michel Piron		UDI	Mar 15, 1943	Saumur	Pays de la Loire	France
Maine-et-Loire's 5th constituency	Gilles Bourdouleix		DVD	Apr 15, 1960	Angers	Pays de la Loire	France
Maine-et-Loire's 6th constituency	Serge Bardy		DVG	Nov 6, 1947	Mésanger	Pays de la Loire	France
Maine-et-Loire's 7th constituency	Marc Laffineur		UMP	Aug 10, 1945	Maubeuge	Nord-Pas-de-Calais	France
Manche's 1st constituency	Philippe Gosselin		UMP	Oct 23, 1966	Carentan	Lower Normandy	France
Manche's 2nd constituency	Guénhaël Huet		UMP	Jul 30, 1956	Locmariaquer	Brittany	France
Manche's 3rd constituency	Stéphane Travert		PS	Oct 12, 1969	Carentan	Lower Normandy	France
Manche's 4th constituency	Geneviève Gosselin		PS	Feb 22, 1954	Cherbourg-Octeville	Lower Normandy	France
Marne's 1st constituency	Arnaud Robinet		UMP	Apr 30, 1975	Reims	Champagne-Ardenne	France
Marne's 2nd constituency	Catherine Vautrin		UMP	Jul 26, 1960	Reims	Champagne-Ardenne	France
Marne's 3rd constituency	Philippe-Armand Martin		UMP	Apr 28, 1949	Cumières	Champagne-Ardenne	France
Marne's 4th constituency	Benoist Apparu		UMP	Nov 24, 1969	Toulouse	Midi-Pyrénées	France
Marne's 5th constituency	Charles de Courson		UDI	Apr 2, 1952	Paris	Île-de-France	France
Haute-Marne's 1st constituency	Luc Chatel		UMP	Aug 15, 1964	Bethesda	United States	United States
Haute-Marne's 2nd constituency	François Cornut-Gentille		UMP	May 22, 1958	Saint-Mandé	Île-de-France	France
Mayenne's 1st constituency	Guillaume Garot		PS	May 29, 1966	Laval	Pays de la Loire	France
Mayenne's 2nd constituency	Guillaume Chevrollier		UMP	Oct 27, 1974	Château-Gontier	Pays de la Loire	France
Mayenne's 3rd constituency	Yannick Favennec		UDI	Aug 12, 1958	Chaudron-en-Mauges	Pays de la Loire	France
Meurthe-et-Moselle's 1st constituency	Chaynesse Khirouni		PS	Mar 17, 1968	Douai	Nord-Pas-de-Calais	France
Meurthe-et-Moselle's 2nd constituency	Hervé Féron		PS	Aug 3, 1956	Luxeuil-les-Bains	Franche-Comté	France
Meurthe-et-Moselle's 3rd constituency	Jean-Marc Fournel		PS	Dec 9, 1958	Longwy	Duchy of Lorraine	France
Meurthe-et-Moselle's 4th constituency	Jacques Lamblin		UMP	Aug 29, 1952	Nancy	Duchy of Lorraine	France
Meurthe-et-Moselle's 5th constituency	Dominique Potier		PS	Mar 17, 1964	Toul	Duchy of Lorraine	France
Meurthe-et-Moselle's 6th constituency	Jean-Yves Le Déaut		PS	Feb 1, 1945	Guémené-sur-Scorff	Brittany	France
Meuse's 1st constituency	Bertrand Pancher		UDI	Jun 5, 1958	Saint-Mihiel	Duchy of Lorraine	France
Meuse's 2nd constituency	Jean-Louis Dumont		PS	Apr 6, 1944	Jonville-en-Woëvre	Duchy of Lorraine	France
Morbihan's 1st constituency	Hervé Pellois		DVG	Apr 17, 1951	La Chapelle Blanche	Brittany	France
Morbihan's 2nd constituency	Philippe Le Ray		DVD	Jun 16, 1968	Vannes	Brittany	France
Morbihan's 3rd constituency	Jean-Pierre Le Roch		PS	Mar 18, 1946	Locmalo	Brittany	France
Morbihan's 4th constituency	Paul Molac		UDB	May 21, 1962	Ploërmel	Brittany	France
Morbihan's 5th constituency	Gwendal Rouillard		PS	Apr 20, 1976	Pontivy	Brittany	France
Morbihan's 6th constituency	Philippe Noguès		PS	May 7, 1955	Malestroit	Brittany	France
Moselle's 1st constituency	Gérard Terrier		PS	Feb 1, 1948	Verdun	Duchy of Lorraine	France
Moselle's 2nd constituency	Denis Jacquat		UMP	May 29, 1944	Thiaucourt	Duchy of Lorraine	France
Moselle's 3rd constituency	Marie-Jo Zimmermann		UMP	Apr 29, 1951	Creutzwald	Duchy of Lorraine	France
Moselle's 4th constituency	Alain Marty		UMP	Mar 7, 1946	Castelnaudary	Languedoc-Roussillon	France
Moselle's 5th constituency	Céleste Lett		UMP	May 7, 1951	Sarreguemines	Duchy of Lorraine	France
Moselle's 6th constituency	Laurent Kalinowski		PS	Jun 28, 1955	Stiring-Wendel	Duchy of Lorraine	France
Moselle's 7th constituency	Paola Zanetti		PS	Sep 1, 1976	Créhange	Duchy of Lorraine	France
Moselle's 8th constituency	Michel Liebgott		PS	Feb 15, 1958	Algrange	Duchy of Lorraine	France
Moselle's 9th constituency	Anne Grommerch		UMP	Dec 11, 1970	Thionville	Duchy of Lorraine	France
Nièvre's 1st constituency	Martine Carrillon-Couvreur		PS	Mar 21, 1948	Lyon	Rhône-Alpes	France
Nièvre's 2nd constituency	Christian Paul		PS	Mar 23, 1960	Clermont-Ferrand	Auvergne	France
Nord's 1st constituency	Bernard Roman		PS	Jul 15, 1952	Lille	Nord-Pas-de-Calais	France
Nord's 2nd constituency	Audrey Linkenheld		PS	Oct 11, 1973	Strasbourg	Alsace	France
Nord's 3rd constituency	Rémi Pauvros		PS	Jul 1, 1952	Hautmont	Nord-Pas-de-Calais	France
Nord's 4th constituency	Marc-Philippe Daubresse		UMP	Aug 1, 1953	Lille	Nord-Pas-de-Calais	France
Nord's 5th constituency	Sébastien Huyghe		UMP	Oct 25, 1969	Béthune	Nord-Pas-de-Calais	France
Nord's 6th constituency	Thierry Lazaro		UMP	Sep 27, 1960	Lille	Nord-Pas-de-Calais	France
Nord's 7th constituency	Francis Vercamer		UDI	May 10, 1958	Lille	Nord-Pas-de-Calais	France
Nord's 8th constituency	Dominique Baert		DVG	Oct 24, 1959	Tourcoing	Nord-Pas-de-Calais	France
Nord's 9th constituency	Bernard Gérard		UMP	Aug 29, 1953	Valenciennes	Nord-Pas-de-Calais	France
Nord's 10th constituency	Gérald Darmanin		UMP	Oct 11, 1982	Valenciennes	Nord-Pas-de-Calais	France
Nord's 11th constituency	Yves Durand		PS	Jun 6, 1946	Ambrières-les-Vallées	Pays de la Loire	France
Nord's 12th constituency	Christian Bataille		PS	May 13, 1946	Rieux-en-Cambrésis	Nord-Pas-de-Calais	France
Nord's 13th constituency	Christian Hutin		MRC	Jan 18, 1961	Lille	Nord-Pas-de-Calais	France
Nord's 14th constituency	Jean-Pierre Decool		UMP	Oct 19, 1952	Bourbourg	Nord-Pas-de-Calais	France
Nord's 15th constituency	Jean-Pierre Allossery		PS	Jul 31, 1945	Hazebrouck	Nord-Pas-de-Calais	France
Nord's 16th constituency	Jean-Jacques Candelier		FG	Mar 7, 1945	Bugnicourt	Nord-Pas-de-Calais	France
Nord's 17th constituency	Marc Dolez		FG	Oct 21, 1952	Douai	Nord-Pas-de-Calais	France
Nord's 18th constituency	François-Xavier Villain		UDI	May 31, 1950	Abbeville	Picardy	France
Nord's 19th constituency	Anne-Lise Dufour-Tonini		PS	Mar 2, 1970	Denain	Nord-Pas-de-Calais	France
Nord's 20th constituency	Alain Bocquet		FG	May 6, 1946	Marquillies	Nord-Pas-de-Calais	France
Nord's 21st constituency	Jean-Louis Borloo		UDI	Apr 7, 1951	Paris	Île-de-France	France
Oise's 1st constituency	Olivier Dassault		UMP	Jun 1, 1951	Boulogne-Billancourt	Île-de-France	France
Oise's 2nd constituency	Jean-François Mancel		UMP	Mar 1, 1948	Beauvais	Picardy	France
Oise's 3rd constituency	Michel Françaix		PS	May 28, 1943	Paris	Île-de-France	France
Oise's 4th constituency	Éric Woerth		UMP	Jan 29, 1956	Creil	Picardy	France
Oise's 5th constituency	Lucien Degauchy		UMP	Jun 11, 1937	Hautefontaine	Picardy	France
Oise's 6th constituency	Patrice Carvalho		FG	Nov 15, 1952	Compiègne	Picardy	France
Oise's 7th constituency	Édouard Courtial		UMP	Jun 28, 1973	Neuilly-sur-Seine	Île-de-France	France
Orne's 1st constituency	Joaquim Pueyo		PS	May 30, 1950	Alençon	Lower Normandy	France
Orne's 2nd constituency	Véronique Louwagie		UMP	Mar 20, 1961	Buis-sur-Damville	Upper Normandy	France
Orne's 3rd constituency	Yves Goasdoué		DVG	Aug 22, 1959	Cherbourg	Lower Normandy	France
Pas-de-Calais's 1st constituency	Jean-Jacques Cottel		PS	Jul 17, 1953	Bapaume	Nord-Pas-de-Calais	France
Pas-de-Calais's 2nd constituency	Jacqueline Maquet		PS	May 13, 1949	Estrée-Blanche	Nord-Pas-de-Calais	France
Pas-de-Calais's 3rd constituency	Guy Delcourt		PS	Jul 13, 1947	Palaiseau	Île-de-France	France
Pas-de-Calais's 4th constituency	Daniel Fasquelle		UMP	Jan 16, 1963	Saint-Omer	Nord-Pas-de-Calais	France
Pas-de-Calais's 5th constituency	Thérèse Guilbert		PS	Feb 18, 1943	Abbeville	Picardy	France
Pas-de-Calais's 6th constituency	Brigitte Bourguignon		PS	May 21, 1959	Boulogne-sur-Mer	Nord-Pas-de-Calais	France
Pas-de-Calais's 7th constituency	Yann Capet		PS	Dec 31, 1975	Calais	Nord-Pas-de-Calais	France
Pas-de-Calais's 8th constituency	Michel Lefait		PS	May 20, 1946	Blendecques	Nord-Pas-de-Calais	France
Pas-de-Calais's 9th constituency	Stéphane Saint-André		PRG	May 21, 1964	Saint-Omer	Nord-Pas-de-Calais	France
Pas-de-Calais's 10th constituency	Serge Janquin		PS	Aug 5, 1943	Bruay-en-Artois	Nord-Pas-de-Calais	France
Pas-de-Calais's 11th constituency	Philippe Kemel		PS	Jun 28, 1948	Emmerin	Nord-Pas-de-Calais	France
Pas-de-Calais's 12th constituency	Nicolas Bays		PS	May 1, 1977	Béthune	Nord-Pas-de-Calais	France
Puy-de-Dôme's 1st constituency	Odile Saugues		PS	Jan 26, 1943	Clermont-Ferrand	Auvergne	France
Puy-de-Dôme's 2nd constituency	Christine Pirès-Beaune		PS	Oct 6, 1964	Saint-Georges-de-Mons	Auvergne	France
Puy-de-Dôme's 3rd constituency	Danielle Auroi		EÉLV	Feb 29, 1944	Clermont-Ferrand	Auvergne	France
Puy-de-Dôme's 4th constituency	Jean-Paul Bacquet		PS	Mar 11, 1949	Saint-Mandé	Île-de-France	France
Puy-de-Dôme's 5th constituency	André Chassaigne		FG	Jul 2, 1950	Clermont-Ferrand	Auvergne	France
Pyrénées-Atlantiques's 1st constituency	Martine Lignières-Cassou		PS	Feb 22, 1952	Alger	Algeria	Algeria
Pyrénées-Atlantiques's 2nd constituency	Nathalie Chabanne		PS	Jan 3, 1973	Oloron-Sainte-Marie	Aquitaine	France
Pyrénées-Atlantiques's 3rd constituency	David Habib		PS	Mar 16, 1961	Paris	Île-de-France	France
Pyrénées-Atlantiques's 4th constituency	Jean Lassalle		MoDem	May 3, 1955	Lourdios-Ichère	Aquitaine	France
Pyrénées-Atlantiques's 5th constituency	Colette Capdevielle		PS	Oct 14, 1958	Orthez	Aquitaine	France
Pyrénées-Atlantiques's 6th constituency	Sylviane Alaux		PS	Jul 1, 1945	Choisy-le-Roi	Île-de-France	France
Hautes-Pyrénées's 1st constituency	Jean Glavany		PS	May 14, 1949	Sceaux	Île-de-France	France
Hautes-Pyrénées's 2nd constituency	Jeanine Dubié		PRG	Jan 3, 1958	Lourdes	Midi-Pyrénées	France
Pyrénées-Orientales's 1st constituency	Jacques Cresta		PS	Feb 16, 1955	Alger	Algeria	Algeria
Pyrénées-Orientales's 2nd constituency	Fernand Siré		UMP	Mar 31, 1945	Saint-Laurent-de-la-Salanque	Languedoc-Roussillon	France
Pyrénées-Orientales's 3rd constituency	Robert Olive		PS		?		France
Pyrénées-Orientales's 4th constituency	Pierre Aylagas		PS	Jul 24, 1942	Perpignan	Languedoc-Roussillon	France
Bas-Rhin's 1st constituency	Armand Jung		PS	Dec 13, 1950	Théding	Duchy of Lorraine	France
Bas-Rhin's 2nd constituency	Philippe Bies		PS	Jan 14, 1964	Saint-Avold	Duchy of Lorraine	France
Bas-Rhin's 3rd constituency	André Schneider		UMP	Jan 3, 1947	Strasbourg	Alsace	France
Bas-Rhin's 4th constituency	Sophie Rohfritsch		UMP	Aug 27, 1962	Grenoble	Rhône-Alpes	France
Bas-Rhin's 5th constituency	Antoine Herth		UMP	Feb 14, 1963	Sélestat	Alsace	France
Bas-Rhin's 6th constituency	Laurent Furst		PR	May 19, 1965	Colmar	Alsace	France
Bas-Rhin's 7th constituency	Patrick Hetzel		UMP	Jul 2, 1964	Phalsbourg	Duchy of Lorraine	France
Bas-Rhin's 8th constituency	Frédéric Reiss		PR	Nov 12, 1949	Haguenau	Alsace	France
Bas-Rhin's 9th constituency	Claude Sturni		DVD	Aug 25, 1962	Haguenau	Alsace	France
Haut-Rhin's 1st constituency	Éric Straumann		UMP	Aug 17, 1964	Colmar	Alsace	France
Haut-Rhin's 2nd constituency	Jean-Louis Christ		UMP	Jan 24, 1951	Ribeauvillé	Alsace	France
Haut-Rhin's 3rd constituency	Jean-Luc Reitzer		UMP	Dec 29, 1951	Altkirch	Alsace	France
Haut-Rhin's 4th constituency	Michel Sordi		UMP	Nov 9, 1953	Mulhouse	Alsace	France
Haut-Rhin's 5th constituency	Arlette Grosskost		UMP	Jul 19, 1953	Wissembourg	Alsace	France
Haut-Rhin's 6th constituency	Francis Hillmeyer		UDI	Sep 9, 1946	Mulhouse	Alsace	France
Rhône's 1st constituency	Gilda Hobert		PRG		?		France
Rhône's 2nd constituency	Pierre-Alain Muet		PS	Jan 1, 1945	Lyon	Rhône-Alpes	France
Rhône's 3rd constituency	Jean-Louis Touraine		PS	Oct 8, 1945	Lyon	Rhône-Alpes	France
Rhône's 4th constituency	Dominique Nachury		UMP	Jun 1, 1951	Chambéry	Rhône-Alpes	France
Rhône's 5th constituency	Philippe Cochet		UMP	May 23, 1961	Lyon	Rhône-Alpes	France
Rhône's 6th constituency	Pascale Crozon		PS	May 29, 1944	Morillon	Rhône-Alpes	France
Rhône's 7th constituency	Hélène Geoffroy		PS	Mar 4, 1970	Creil	Picardy	France
Rhône's 8th constituency	Patrice Verchère		UMP	Dec 29, 1973	Le Coteau	Rhône-Alpes	France
Rhône's 9th constituency	Bernard Perrut		UMP	Jan 24, 1957	Villefranche-sur-Saône	Rhône-Alpes	France
Rhône's 10th constituency	Christophe Guilloteau		UMP	Jun 18, 1958	Lyon	Rhône-Alpes	France
Rhône's 11th constituency	Georges Fenech		UMP	Oct 26, 1954	Sousse	Tunisia	Tunisia
Rhône's 12th constituency	Michel Terrot		UMP	Dec 18, 1948	Lyon	Rhône-Alpes	France
Rhône's 13th constituency	Philippe Meunier		UMP	Mar 16, 1966	Bron	Rhône-Alpes	France
Rhône's 14th constituency	Yves Blein		PS	Oct 12, 1954	Lyon	Rhône-Alpes	France
Haute-Saône's 1st constituency	Alain Chrétien		UMP	Mar 17, 1975	Vesoul	Franche-Comté	France
Haute-Saône's 2nd constituency	Jean-Michel Villaumé		PS	Mar 27, 1946	Bavilliers	Franche-Comté	France
Saône-et-Loire's 1st constituency	Thomas Thévenoud		PS	May 5, 1974	Dijon	Burgundy	France
Saône-et-Loire's 2nd constituency	Édith Gueugneau		DVG	Jun 7, 1953	Bourbon-Lancy	Burgundy	France
Saône-et-Loire's 3rd constituency	Philippe Baumel		PS	Nov 14, 1961	Nogaro	Midi-Pyrénées	France
Saône-et-Loire's 4th constituency	Cécile Untermaier		PS	Dec 28, 1951	Belley	Rhône-Alpes	France
Saône-et-Loire's 5th constituency	Christophe Sirugue		PS	Aug 14, 1966	Autun	Burgundy	France
Sarthe's 1st constituency	Françoise Dubois		PS	Dec 6, 1947	Coulans-sur-Gée	Pays de la Loire	France
Sarthe's 2nd constituency	Marietta Karamanli		PS	Dec 18, 1964	Athens	Greece	Greece
Sarthe's 3rd constituency	Guy-Michel Chauveau		DVG	Sep 25, 1944	Irais	Poitou-Charentes	France
Sarthe's 4th constituency	Sylvie Tolmont		PS	Oct 9, 1962	Le Mans	Pays de la Loire	France
Sarthe's 5th constituency	Dominique Le Mèner		UMP	Nov 12, 1958	Le Mans	Pays de la Loire	France
Savoie's 1st constituency	Dominique Dord		UMP	Sep 1, 1959	Chambéry	Rhône-Alpes	France
Savoie's 2nd constituency	Hervé Gaymard		UMP	May 31, 1960	Bourg-Saint-Maurice	Rhône-Alpes	France
Savoie's 3rd constituency	Béatrice Santais		PS	Sep 17, 1964	Montmélian	Rhône-Alpes	France
Savoie's 4th constituency	Bernadette Laclais		PS	Mar 10, 1967	Chambéry	Rhône-Alpes	France
Haute-Savoie's 1st constituency	Bernard Accoyer		UMP	Aug 12, 1945	Lyon	Rhône-Alpes	France
Haute-Savoie's 2nd constituency	Lionel Tardy		UMP	Jun 7, 1966	Annecy-le-Vieux	Rhône-Alpes	France
Haute-Savoie's 3rd constituency	Martial Saddier		UMP	Oct 15, 1969	Bonneville	Rhône-Alpes	France
Haute-Savoie's 4th constituency	Virginie Duby-Muller		UMP	Aug 16, 1979	Bonneville	Rhône-Alpes	France
Haute-Savoie's 5th constituency	Marc Francina		UMP	Feb 2, 1948	Evian-les-Bains	Rhône-Alpes	France
Haute-Savoie's 6th constituency	Sophie Dion		UMP	Mar 25, 1956	Dijon	Burgundy	France
Paris's 1st constituency	Pierre Lellouche		UMP	May 3, 1951	Tunis	Tunisia	Tunisia
Paris's 2nd constituency	François Fillon		UMP	Mar 4, 1954	Le Mans	Pays de la Loire	France
Paris's 3rd constituency	Annick Lepetit		PS	Mar 31, 1958	Boulogne-Billancourt	Île-de-France	France
Paris's 4th constituency	Bernard Debré		UMP	Sep 30, 1944	Toulouse	Midi-Pyrénées	France
Paris's 5th constituency	Seybah Dagoma		PS	Jun 9, 1978	Nantes	Pays de la Loire	France
Paris's 6th constituency	Cécile Duflot		EÉLV	Apr 1, 1975	Villeneuve-Saint-Georges	Île-de-France	France
Paris's 7th constituency	Patrick Bloche		PS	Jul 4, 1956	Neuilly-sur-Seine	Île-de-France	France
Paris's 8th constituency	Sandrine Mazetier		PS	Dec 16, 1966	Rodez	Midi-Pyrénées	France
Paris's 9th constituency	Anne-Christine Lang		PS	Aug 10, 1961	Mont-de-Marsan	Aquitaine	France
Paris's 10th constituency	Denis Baupin		EÉLV	Jun 2, 1962	Cherbourg-Octeville	Lower Normandy	France
Paris's 11th constituency	Pascal Cherki		PS	Sep 1, 1966	Paris	Île-de-France	France
Paris's 12th constituency	Philippe Goujon		UMP	Apr 30, 1954	Paris	Île-de-France	France
Paris's 13th constituency	Jean-François Lamour		UMP	Feb 2, 1956	Paris	Île-de-France	France
Paris's 14th constituency	Claude Goasguen		UMP	Mar 12, 1945	Toulon	Provence-Alpes-Côte d'Azur	France
Paris's 15th constituency	Fanélie Carrey-Conte		PS	May 16, 1980	Bègles	Aquitaine	France
Paris's 16th constituency	Jean-Christophe Cambadélis		PS	Aug 14, 1951	Neuilly-sur-Seine	Île-de-France	France
Paris's 17th constituency	Daniel Vaillant		PS	Jul 19, 1949	Lormes	Burgundy	France
Paris's 18th constituency	Christophe Caresche		PS	Sep 2, 1960	Arcachon	Aquitaine	France
Seine-Maritime's 1st constituency	Pierre Léautey		PS	Dec 12, 1946	Paris	Île-de-France	France
Seine-Maritime's 2nd constituency	Françoise Guégot		UMP	Aug 11, 1962	Oullins	Rhône-Alpes	France
Seine-Maritime's 3rd constituency	Luce Pane		PS	Sep 28, 1955	Lillebonne	Upper Normandy	France
Seine-Maritime's 4th constituency	Guillaume Bachelay		PS	Jul 13, 1974	Elbeuf	Upper Normandy	France
Seine-Maritime's 5th constituency	Christophe Bouillon		PS	Mar 4, 1969	Rouen	Upper Normandy	France
Seine-Maritime's 6th constituency	Sandrine Hurel		PS	Aug 7, 1968	Lisieux	Lower Normandy	France
Seine-Maritime's 7th constituency	Édouard Philippe		UMP	Nov 28, 1970	Rouen	Upper Normandy	France
Seine-Maritime's 8th constituency	Catherine Troallic		PS	May 10, 1974	Sainte-Adresse	Upper Normandy	France
Seine-Maritime's 9th constituency	Estelle Grelier		PS	Jun 22, 1973	La Roche-sur-Yon	Pays de la Loire	France
Seine-Maritime's 10th constituency	Dominique Chauvel		PS	Feb 15, 1958	Auchel	Nord-Pas-de-Calais	France
Seine-et-Marne's 1st constituency	Jean-Claude Mignon		UMP	Feb 2, 1950	Corbeil-Essonnes	Île-de-France	France
Seine-et-Marne's 2nd constituency	Valérie Lacroute		UMP	Oct 29, 1965	Châlon-sur-Saône	Burgundy	France
Seine-et-Marne's 3rd constituency	Yves Jégo		UDI	Apr 17, 1961	Besançon	Franche-Comté	France
Seine-et-Marne's 4th constituency	Christian Jacob		UMP	Dec 4, 1959	Rozay-en-Brie	Île-de-France	France
Seine-et-Marne's 5th constituency	Franck Riester		UMP	Jan 3, 1974	Paris	Île-de-France	France
Seine-et-Marne's 6th constituency	Jean-François Copé		UMP	May 5, 1964	Boulogne-Billancourt	Île-de-France	France
Seine-et-Marne's 7th constituency	Yves Albarello		UMP	Mar 17, 1952	Aulnay-sous-Bois	Île-de-France	France
Seine-et-Marne's 8th constituency	Eduardo Rihan Cypel		PS	Nov 13, 1975	Porto Alegre	Brazil	Brazil
Seine-et-Marne's 9th constituency	Guy Geoffroy		UMP	May 26, 1949	Paris	Île-de-France	France
Seine-et-Marne's 10th constituency	Émeric Bréhier		PS	Dec 26, 1971	Paris	Île-de-France	France
Seine-et-Marne's 11th constituency	Olivier Faure		PS	Aug 18, 1968	Grenoble	Rhône-Alpes	France
Yvelines's 1st constituency	François de Mazières		DVD	May 22, 1960	Tarbes	Midi-Pyrénées	France
Yvelines's 2nd constituency	Valérie Pécresse		UMP	Jul 14, 1967	Neuilly-sur-Seine	Île-de-France	France
Yvelines's 3rd constituency	Henri Guaino		UMP	Mar 11, 1957	Arles	Provence-Alpes-Côte d'Azur	France
Yvelines's 4th constituency	Pierre Lequiller		UMP	Dec 4, 1949	London	United Kingdom	United Kingdom
Yvelines's 5th constituency	Jacques Myard		UMP	Aug 14, 1947	Lyon	Rhône-Alpes	France
Yvelines's 6th constituency	Pierre Morange		UMP	Sep 8, 1956	Clermont-Ferrand	Auvergne	France
Yvelines's 7th constituency	Arnaud Richard		UDI	Apr 30, 1971	Rouen	Upper Normandy	France
Yvelines's 8th constituency	Françoise Descamps-Crosnier		PS	Oct 13, 1955	Mantes-la-Jolie	Île-de-France	France
Yvelines's 9th constituency	Jean-Marie Tétart		UMP	Sep 1, 1949	Tigny-Noyelle	Nord-Pas-de-Calais	France
Yvelines's 10th constituency	Jean-Frédéric Poisson		PCD	Jan 22, 1963	Belfort	Franche-Comté	France
Yvelines's 11th constituency	Jean-Philippe Mallé		PS	Oct 31, 1963	Bayonne	Aquitaine	France
Yvelines's 12th constituency	David Douillet		UMP	Feb 17, 1969	Rouen	Upper Normandy	France
Deux-Sèvres's 1st constituency	Geneviève Gaillard		PS	May 13, 1947	Niort	Poitou-Charentes	France
Deux-Sèvres's 2nd constituency	Delphine Batho		PS	Mar 23, 1973	Paris	Île-de-France	France
Deux-Sèvres's 3rd constituency	Jean Grellier		PS	May 17, 1947	Moncoutant	Poitou-Charentes	France
Somme's 1st constituency	Pascale Boistard		PS	Jan 4, 1971	Mont-de-Marsan	Aquitaine	France
Somme's 2nd constituency	Barbara Pompili		EÉLV	Jun 13, 1975	Bois-Bernard	Nord-Pas-de-Calais	France
Somme's 3rd constituency	Jean-Claude Buisine		PS	Jun 14, 1947	Berck	Nord-Pas-de-Calais	France
Somme's 4th constituency	Alain Gest		UMP	Dec 27, 1950	Amiens	Picardy	France
Somme's 5th constituency	Stéphane Demilly		UDI	Jun 26, 1963	Albert	Picardy	France
Tarn's 1st constituency	Philippe Folliot		UDI	Jul 14, 1963	Albi	Midi-Pyrénées	France
Tarn's 2nd constituency	Jacques Valax		PS	Aug 23, 1951	Albi	Midi-Pyrénées	France
Tarn's 3rd constituency	Linda Gourjade		PS	Jul 13, 1962	Timmins	Canada	Canada
Tarn-et-Garonne's 1st constituency	Valérie Rabault		PS	Apr 25, 1973	L'Haÿ-les-Roses	Île-de-France	France
Tarn-et-Garonne's 2nd constituency	Jacques Moignard		PS	Aug 8, 1951	Montauban	Midi-Pyrénées	France
Var's 1st constituency	Geneviève Levy		UMP	Feb 24, 1948	Marseille	Provence-Alpes-Côte d'Azur	France
Var's 2nd constituency	Philippe Vitel		UMP	Feb 22, 1955	Toulon	Provence-Alpes-Côte d'Azur	France
Var's 3rd constituency	Jean-Pierre Giran		UMP	Jan 9, 1947	Marseille	Provence-Alpes-Côte d'Azur	France
Var's 4th constituency	Jean-Michel Couve		UMP	Jan 3, 1940	Le Muy	Provence-Alpes-Côte d'Azur	France
Var's 5th constituency	Georges Ginesta		UMP	Jul 8, 1942	Saint-Raphaël	Provence-Alpes-Côte d'Azur	France
Var's 6th constituency	Josette Pons		UMP	Dec 12, 1947	Saint-Cyr-sur-Mer	Provence-Alpes-Côte d'Azur	France
Var's 7th constituency	Jean-Sébastien Vialatte		UMP	Jan 30, 1951	Saint-Étienne	Rhône-Alpes	France
Var's 8th constituency	Olivier Audibert-Troin		UMP	Aug 16, 1960	Draguignan	Provence-Alpes-Côte d'Azur	France
Vaucluse's 1st constituency	Michèle Fournier-Armand		PS	Jul 28, 1946	Avignon	Provence-Alpes-Côte d'Azur	France
Vaucluse's 2nd constituency	Jean-Claude Bouchet		UMP	May 2, 1957	Cavaillon	Provence-Alpes-Côte d'Azur	France
Vaucluse's 3rd constituency	Marion Maréchal-Le Pen		FN	Dec 10, 1989	Saint-Germain-en-Laye	Île-de-France	France
Vaucluse's 4th constituency	Jacques Bompard		LS	Feb 24, 1943	Montpellier	Languedoc-Roussillon	France
Vaucluse's 5th constituency	Julien Aubert		UMP	Jun 11, 1978	Marseille	Provence-Alpes-Côte d'Azur	France
Vendée's 1st constituency	Alain Lebœuf		DVD	Feb 2, 1964	Nantes	Pays de la Loire	France
Vendée's 2nd constituency	Sylviane Bulteau		PS	Apr 21, 1964	Poissy	Île-de-France	France
Vendée's 3rd constituency	Yannick Moreau		UMP	Aug 4, 1975	Nantes	Pays de la Loire	France
Vendée's 4th constituency	Véronique Besse		MPF	Aug 11, 1963	La Roche-sur-Yon	Pays de la Loire	France
Vendée's 5th constituency	Hugues Fourage		PS	Jun 4, 1965	Vertou	Pays de la Loire	France
Vienne's 1st constituency	Alain Claeys		PS	Aug 25, 1948	Poitiers	Poitou-Charentes	France
Vienne's 2nd constituency	Catherine Coutelle		PS	Apr 2, 1945	La Sauvagère	Lower Normandy	France
Vienne's 3rd constituency	Jean-Michel Clément		PS	Oct 31, 1954	Mauprévoir	Poitou-Charentes	France
Vienne's 4th constituency	Véronique Massonneau		EÉLV	Jul 17, 1959	Jemappes	Belgium	Belgium
Haute-Vienne's 1st constituency	Alain Rodet		PS	Jun 4, 1944	Dieulefit	Rhône-Alpes	France
Haute-Vienne's 2nd constituency	Daniel Boisserie		PS	Jun 8, 1946	Saint-Yrieix-la-Perche	Limousin	France
Haute-Vienne's 3rd constituency	Catherine Beaubatie		PS	Feb 10, 1964	Limoges	Limousin	France
Vosges's 1st constituency	Michel Heinrich		UMP	Feb 15, 1946	Thann	Alsace	France
Vosges's 2nd constituency	Gérard Cherpion		UMP	Mar 15, 1948	Dombasle-sur-Meurthe	Duchy of Lorraine	France
Vosges's 3rd constituency	François Vannson		UMP	Oct 20, 1962	Épinal	Duchy of Lorraine	France
Vosges's 4th constituency	Christian Franqueville		PS	May 14, 1949	Saulxures-lès-Bulgnéville	Duchy of Lorraine	France
Yonne's 1st constituency	Guillaume Larrivé		UMP	Jan 24, 1977	Mulhouse	Alsace	France
Yonne's 2nd constituency	Jean-Yves Caullet		PS	Feb 8, 1957	Roubaix	Nord-Pas-de-Calais	France
Yonne's 3rd constituency	Marie-Louise Fort		UMP	Dec 3, 1950	Villeneuve-la-Guyard	Burgundy	France
Territoire-de-Belfort's 1st constituency	Damien Meslot		UMP	Nov 11, 1964	Belfort	Franche-Comté	France
Territoire-de-Belfort's 2nd constituency	Michel Zumkeller		UDI	Jan 21, 1966	Belfort	Franche-Comté	France
Essonne's 1st constituency	Carlos Da Silva		PS	Nov 16, 1974	Corbeil-Essonnes	Île-de-France	France
Essonne's 2nd constituency	Franck Marlin		PR	Sep 30, 1964	Orléans	Centre-Val de Loire	France
Essonne's 3rd constituency	Michel Pouzol		PS	Jul 5, 1962	Clermont-Ferrand	Auvergne	France
Essonne's 4th constituency	Nathalie Kosciusko-Morizet		UMP	May 14, 1973	Paris	Île-de-France	France
Essonne's 5th constituency	Maud Olivier		PS	Feb 20, 1953	Boulogne-Billancourt	Île-de-France	France
Essonne's 6th constituency	François Lamy		PS	Oct 31, 1959	Brunoy	Île-de-France	France
Essonne's 7th constituency	Éva Sas		EÉLV	Aug 13, 1970	Nice	Provence-Alpes-Côte d'Azur	France
Essonne's 8th constituency	Nicolas Dupont-Aignan		DLR	Mar 7, 1961	Paris	Île-de-France	France
Essonne's 9th constituency	Thierry Mandon		PS	Dec 30, 1957	Lausanne	Switzerland	Switzerland
Essonne's 10th constituency	Malek Boutih		PS	Oct 27, 1964	Neuilly-sur-Seine	Île-de-France	France
Hauts-de-Seine's 1st constituency	Alexis Bachelay		PS	Aug 19, 1973	Saint-Maur-des-Fossés	Île-de-France	France
Hauts-de-Seine's 2nd constituency	Sébastien Pietrasanta		PS	Aug 7, 1977	Asnières-sur-Seine	Île-de-France	France
Hauts-de-Seine's 3rd constituency	Jacques Kossowski		UMP	Oct 11, 1940	Paris	Île-de-France	France
Hauts-de-Seine's 4th constituency	Jacqueline Fraysse		FG	Feb 25, 1947	Paris	Île-de-France	France
Hauts-de-Seine's 5th constituency	Patrick Balkany		UMP	Aug 16, 1948	Neuilly-sur-Seine	Île-de-France	France
Hauts-de-Seine's 6th constituency	Jean-Christophe Fromantin		UDI	Aug 30, 1962	Nantes	Pays de la Loire	France
Hauts-de-Seine's 7th constituency	Patrick Ollier		UMP	Dec 17, 1944	Périgueux	Aquitaine	France
Hauts-de-Seine's 8th constituency	Jean-Jacques Guillet		UMP	Oct 16, 1946	Clichy	Île-de-France	France
Hauts-de-Seine's 9th constituency	Thierry Solère		UMP	Aug 17, 1971	Nantes	Pays de la Loire	France
Hauts-de-Seine's 10th constituency	André Santini		UDI	Oct 20, 1940	Paris	Île-de-France	France
Hauts-de-Seine's 11th constituency	Julie Sommaruga		PS	Aug 1, 1975	Nice	Provence-Alpes-Côte d'Azur	France
Hauts-de-Seine's 12th constituency	Jean-Marc Germain		PS	Jun 12, 1966	Lyon	Rhône-Alpes	France
Hauts-de-Seine's 13th constituency	Patrick Devedjian		UMP	Aug 26, 1944	Fontainebleau	Île-de-France	France
Seine-Saint-Denis's 1st constituency	Bruno Le Roux		PS	May 2, 1965	Gennevilliers	Île-de-France	France
Seine-Saint-Denis's 2nd constituency	Mathieu Hanotin		PS	Aug 22, 1978	Compiègne	Picardy	France
Seine-Saint-Denis's 3rd constituency	Michel Pajon		PS	Jun 30, 1949	Drancy	Île-de-France	France
Seine-Saint-Denis's 4th constituency	Marie-George Buffet		FG	May 7, 1949	Sceaux	Île-de-France	France
Seine-Saint-Denis's 5th constituency	Jean-Christophe Lagarde		UDI	Oct 24, 1967	Châtellerault	Poitou-Charentes	France
Seine-Saint-Denis's 6th constituency	Élisabeth Guigou		PS	Aug 6, 1946	Marrakesh	Morocco	Morocco
Seine-Saint-Denis's 7th constituency	Razzy Hammadi		PS	Feb 22, 1979	Toulon	Provence-Alpes-Côte d'Azur	France
Seine-Saint-Denis's 8th constituency	Élisabeth Pochon		PS	Apr 19, 1955	Constantine	Algeria	Algeria
Seine-Saint-Denis's 9th constituency	Claude Bartolone		PS	Jul 29, 1951	Tunis	Tunisia	Tunisia
Seine-Saint-Denis's 10th constituency	Daniel Goldberg		PS	Aug 24, 1965	Saint-Denis	Île-de-France	France
Seine-Saint-Denis's 11th constituency	François Asensi		FG	Jun 1, 1945	Santander	Spain	Spain
Seine-Saint-Denis's 12th constituency	Pascal Popelin		PS	Feb 27, 1967	Paris	Île-de-France	France
Val-de-Marne's 1st constituency	Sylvain Berrios		UMP	May 6, 1968	Maisons-Alfort	Île-de-France	France
Val-de-Marne's 2nd constituency	Laurent Cathala		PS	Sep 21, 1945	Saint-Jean-de-Barrou	Languedoc-Roussillon	France
Val-de-Marne's 3rd constituency	Roger-Gérard Schwartzenberg		PRG	Apr 17, 1943	Pau	Aquitaine	France
Val-de-Marne's 4th constituency	Jacques-Alain Bénisti		UMP	Apr 10, 1952	Paris	Île-de-France	France
Val-de-Marne's 5th constituency	Gilles Carrez		UMP	Aug 29, 1948	Paris	Île-de-France	France
Val-de-Marne's 6th constituency	Laurence Abeille		EÉLV	Jun 17, 1960	Neuilly-sur-Seine	Île-de-France	France
Val-de-Marne's 7th constituency	Jean-Jacques Bridey		PS	May 7, 1953	Nice	Provence-Alpes-Côte d'Azur	France
Val-de-Marne's 8th constituency	Michel Herbillon		UMP	Mar 6, 1951	Saint-Mandé	Île-de-France	France
Val-de-Marne's 9th constituency	René Rouquet		PS	Feb 15, 1946	Charenton-le-Pont	Île-de-France	France
Val-de-Marne's 10th constituency	Jean-Luc Laurent		MRC	Jun 23, 1957	Paris	Île-de-France	France
Val-de-Marne's 11th constituency	Jean-Yves Le Bouillonnec		PS	Sep 15, 1950	Cachan	Île-de-France	France
Val d'Oise's 1st constituency	Philippe Houillon		UMP	Dec 15, 1951	Bagnolet	Île-de-France	France
Val d'Oise's 2nd constituency	Axel Poniatowski		UMP	Aug 3, 1951	Rabat	Morocco	Morocco
Val d'Oise's 3rd constituency	Jean-Noël Carpentier		MUP	Dec 9, 1969	Nanterre	Île-de-France	France
Val d'Oise's 4th constituency	Gérard Sebaoun		PS	Nov 28, 1950	Algiers	Algeria	Algeria
Val d'Oise's 5th constituency	Philippe Doucet		PS	May 16, 1961	Le Havre	Upper Normandy	France
Val d'Oise's 6th constituency	François Scellier		PR	May 7, 1936	Amiens	Picardy	France
Val d'Oise's 7th constituency	Jérôme Chartier		UMP	Nov 14, 1966	Paris	Île-de-France	France
Val d'Oise's 8th constituency	François Pupponi		PS	Jul 31, 1962	Nantua	Rhône-Alpes	France
Val d'Oise's 9th constituency	Jean-Pierre Blazy		PS	Nov 24, 1949	Gonesse	Île-de-France	France
Val d'Oise's 10th constituency	Dominique Lefebvre		PS	May 7, 1956	Roubaix	Nord-Pas-de-Calais	France
Guadeloupe's 1st constituency	Éric Jalton		DVG	Sep 16, 1961	Les Abymes	Guadeloupe	France
Guadeloupe's 2nd constituency	Gabrielle Louis-Carabin		DVG	Feb 20, 1946	Le Moule	Guadeloupe	France
Guadeloupe's 3rd constituency	Ary Chalus		DVG	Dec 6, 1961	Pointe-à-Pitre	Guadeloupe	France
Guadeloupe's 4th constituency	Victorin Lurel		PS	Aug 20, 1951	Vieux-Habitants	Guadeloupe	France
Martinique's 1st constituency	Alfred Marie-Jeanne		MIM	Nov 15, 1936	Rivière-Pilote	Martinique	France
Martinique's 2nd constituency	Bruno Nestor Azérot		DVG	Jul 22, 1961	La Trinité	Martinique	France
Martinique's 3rd constituency	Serge Letchimy		PPM	Jan 13, 1953	Gros-Morne	Martinique	France
Martinique's 4th constituency	Jean-Philippe Nilor		MIM	May 15, 1965	Fort-de-France	Martinique	France
French Guiana's 1st constituency	Gabriel Serville		PSG	Sep 27, 1959	Cayenne	French Guiana	France
French Guiana's 2nd constituency	Chantal Berthelot		AGEG	Sep 12, 1958	Mana	French Guiana	France
Réunion's 1st constituency	Ericka Bareigts		PS	Apr 16, 1967	Saint-Denis	Réunion	France
Réunion's 2nd constituency	Huguette Bello		MPR	Aug 24, 1950	Ravine des Cabris	Réunion	France
Réunion's 3rd constituency	Jean-Jacques Vlody		PS	Aug 19, 1967	Saint-Benoît	Réunion	France
Réunion's 4th constituency	Patrick Lebreton		PS	Sep 6, 1963	Saint-Joseph	Réunion	France
Réunion's 5th constituency	Jean-Claude Fruteau		PS	Jun 6, 1947	Saint-Benoît	Réunion	France
Réunion's 6th constituency	Monique Orphé		PS	Oct 15, 1964	Saint-Denis	Réunion	France
Réunion's 7th constituency	Thierry Robert		MoDem	Apr 1, 1977	Saint-Denis	Réunion	France
Saint-Pierre-et-Miquelon's 1st constituency	Catherine Pen		PRG		?		France
Saint-Barthélemy and Saint-Martin's 1st constituency	Daniel Gibbs		UMP	Jan 8, 1968	Sint Maarten	Sint Maarten	Netherlands
Mayotte's 1st constituency	Boinali Saïd		DVG	Sep 25, 1960	Dzaoudzi	Mayotte	France
Mayotte's 2nd constituency	Ibrahim Aboubacar		PS	Feb 1, 1965	Fomboni	Comoros	Comoros
Wallis and Futuna's 1st constituency	Napole Polutele		DVG	Jun 25, 1965	Wallis	Wallis and Futuna	France
French Polynesia's 1st constituency	Édouard Fritch		UDI	Jan 4, 1952	Papeete	French Polynesia	France
French Polynesia's 2nd constituency	Jonas Tahuaitu		UDI	Aug 16, 1944	Papearii	French Polynesia	France
French Polynesia's 3rd constituency	Jean-Paul Tuaiva		UDI	Oct 30, 1972	Papeete	French Polynesia	France
New Caledonia's 1st constituency	Sonia Lagarde		UDI	Aug 29, 1948	Nouméa	New Caledonia	France
New Caledonia's 2nd constituency	Philippe Gomès		UDI	Oct 27, 1958	Algiers	Algeria	Algeria
First constituency for French residents overseas	Frédéric Lefebvre		UMP	Oct 14, 1963	Neuilly-sur-Seine	Île-de-France	France
Second constituency for French residents overseas	Sergio Coronado		EÉLV	May 13, 1970	Osorno	Chile	Chile
Third constituency for French residents overseas	Christophe Premat		PS	Dec 7, 1976	Annecy	Rhône-Alpes	France
Fourth constituency for French residents overseas	Philip Cordery		PS	Apr 17, 1966	Neuilly-sur-Seine	Île-de-France	France
Fifth constituency for French residents overseas	Arnaud Leroy		PS	Apr 23, 1976	Lille	Nord-Pas-de-Calais	France
Sixth constituency for French residents overseas	Claudine Schmid		UMP	Sep 13, 1955	Saint-Julien-en-Genevois	Rhône-Alpes	France
Seventh constituency for French residents overseas	Pierre-Yves Le Borgn'		PS	Nov 4, 1964	Quimper	Brittany	France
Eighth constituency for French residents overseas	Meyer Habib		UDI	Apr 28, 1961	Paris	Île-de-France	France
Ninth constituency for French residents overseas	Pouria Amirshahi		PS	Mar 27, 1972	Shemiran	Iran	Iran
Tenth constituency for French residents overseas	Alain Marsaud		UMP	Mar 8, 1949	Limoges	Limousin	France
Eleventh constituency for French residents overseas	Thierry Mariani		UMP	Aug 8, 1958	Orange	Provence-Alpes-Côte d'Azur	France

== Former deputies ==
Constituency		Deputy	Date of birth	Place of birth	Portrait	Party	Group	Mandate end	Reason	Successor
Bouches-du-Rhône	8th	Olivier Ferrand	8 November 1969	France (Velaux)		PS	SRC	30 June 2012	Death	Jean-Pierre Maggi
Seine-Maritime	4th	Laurent Fabius	20 August 1946	France (Paris)		PS	SRC	21 July 2012	Appointed to government	Guillaume Bachelay
Val-de-Marne	1st	Henri Plagnol	11 February 1961	France (Paris)		UMP	UDI	18 October 2012	Election annulled by the Constitutional Council	Sylvain Berrios
Hérault	6th	Dolorès Roqué	29 January 1952	Spain (Pinoso)		PS	SRC	24 October 2012	Election annulled by the Constitutional Council	Élie Aboud
Wallis and Futuna	1st	David Vergé	10 January 1972	France (La Fère)		DVD	SRC app.	25 January 2013	Election annulled by the Constitutional Council	Napole Polutélé
French residents overseas	8th	Daphna Poznanski-Benhamou	3 June 1950	Algeria (Oran)		PS	SRC	15 February 2013	Election annulled by the Constitutional Council	Meyer Habib
French residents overseas	1st	Corinne Narassiguin	7 March 1975	France (Le Port)		PS	SRC	15 February 2013	Election annulled by the Constitutional Council	Frédéric Lefebvre
Lot-et-Garonne	3rd	Jean-Claude Gouget	5 November 1942	France (Saint-Eutrope-de-Born)		PS	SRC	19 April 2013	Resumption of the mandate by a former member of the Government	Jérôme Cahuzac
Lot-et-Garonne	3rd	Jérôme Cahuzac	19 June 1952	France (Talence)		PS	SRC	20 April 2013	Resignation (Cahuzac affair)	Jean-Louis Costes
Deux-Sèvres	2nd	Jean-Luc Drapeau	26 September 1953	France (Thouars)		PS	SRC	2 August 2013	Resumption of the mandate by a former member of the Government	Delphine Batho
Haute-Garonne	3rd	Jean-Luc Moudenc	16 July 1960	France (Toulouse)		UMP	UMP	10 April 2014	Resignation (Elected mayor of Toulouse)	Laurence Arribagé
French Polynesia	1st	Édouard Fritch	4 January 1952	France (Papeete)		Tahoera'a Huiraatira	UDI	23 April 2014	Resignation (Elected mayor of Pirae)	Maina Sage
Loire-Atlantique	3rd	Jean-Pierre Fougerat	11 May 1953	France (Poitiers)		PS	SRC	30 April 2014	Resumption of the mandate by a former member of the Government	Jean-Marc Ayrault
Nord	21st	Jean-Louis Borloo	7 April 1952	France (Paris)		UDI	UDI	30 April 2014	Resignation (Health problem)	Laurent Degallaix
Bouches-du-Rhône	5th	Avi Assouly	5 June 1950	Algeria (Aïn El Arbaa)		PS	SRC	2 May 2014	Resumption of the mandate by a former member of the Government	Marie-Arlette Carlotti
Gironde	2nd	Vincent Feltesse	4 April 1967	France (Beauvais)		PS	SRC	2 May 2014	Resumption of the mandate by a former member of the Government	Michèle Delaunay
Paris	6th	Danièle Hoffman-Rispal	22 June 1951	France (Paris)		PS	SRC	2 May 2014	Resumption of the mandate by a former member of the Government	Cécile Duflot
Mayenne	1st	Sylvie Pichot	1 June 1955	France (Poissy)		PS	SRC	2 May 2014	Resumption of the mandate by a former member of the Government	Guillaume Garot
Essonne	6th	Jérôme Guedj	23 January 1972	France (Pantin)		PS	SRC	2 May 2014	Resumption of the mandate by a former member of the Government	François Lamy
Guadeloupe	4th	Hélène Vainqueur-Christophe	6 May 1956	France (Trois-Rivières)		PS	SRC	2 May 2014	Resumption of the mandate by a former member of the Government	Victorin Lurel
Gers	1st	Franck Montaugé	14 September 1961	France (Condom)		PS	SRC	2 May 2014	Resumption of the mandate by a former member of the Government	Philippe Martin
Paris	9th	Jean-Marie Le Guen	3 January 1953	France (Paris)		PS	SRC	9 May 2014	Appointed to government	Anne-Christine Lang
Pyrénées-Orientales	3rd	Ségolène Neuville	21 June 1970	France (Boulogne-Billancourt)		PS	SRC	9 May 2014	Appointed to government	Robert Olive
Meurthe-et-Moselle	7th	Christian Eckert	8 February 1956	France (Algrange)		PS	SRC	9 May 2014	Appointed to government	Jean-Marc Fournel
Rhône	1st	Thierry Braillard	24 January 1964	France (Bron)		PRG	RRDP	9 May 2014	Appointed to government	Gilda Hobert
Saint Pierre and Miquelon	1st	Catherine Pen	9 May 1954	France (Saint-Pierre)		PRG	SE	10 May 2014	Resignation (Health problem)	Annick Girardin
Seine-Maritime	1st	Pierre Léautey	12 December 1946	France (Paris)		PS	SRC	3 July 2014	Resumption of the mandate by a former member of the Government	Valérie Fourneyron
Essonne	9th	Thierry Mandon	30 December 1957	Switzerland (Lausanne)		PS	SRC	3 July 2014	Appointed to government	Romain Colas
Saint Pierre and Miquelon	1st	Annick Girardin	3 August 1964	France (Saint-Malo)		PRG	SE	29 July 2014	Appointed to government	Stéphane Claireaux
Pas-de-Calais	5th	Thérèse Guilbert	18 February 1943	France (Abbeville)		PS	SRC	26 September 2014	Resumption of the mandate by a former member of the Government	Frédéric Cuvillier
Yvelines	11th	Jean-Philippe Mallé	31 October 1963	France (Bayonne)		PS	SRC	26 September 2014	Resumption of the mandate by a former member of the Government	Benoît Hamon
Moselle	1st	Gérard Terrier	1 February 1948	France (Verdun)		PS	SRC	26 September 2014	Resumption of the mandate by a former member of the Government	Aurélie Filippetti
Landes	1st	Alain Vidalies	17 March 1951	France (Grenade-sur-l'Adour)		PS	SRC	26 September 2014	Appointed to government	Florence Delaunay
Aveyron	3rd	Alain Marc	29 January 1957	France (Paris)		UMP	UMP	30 September 2014	Resignation (Elected Senator)	Arnaud Viala
Aube	3rd	François Baroin	21 June 1965	France (Paris)		UMP	UMP	30 September 2014	Resignation (Elected Senator)	Gérard Menuel
Lot-et-Garonne	2nd	Matthias Fekl	4 October 1977	Germany (Frankfurt)		PS	SRC	4 October 2014	Appointed to government	Régine Povéda
Doubs	4th	Pierre Moscovici	16 September 1957	France (Paris)		PS	SRC	31 October 2014	Resignation (Appointed European Commissioner)	Frédéric Barbier
Haute-Garonne	10th	Émilienne Poumirol	25 July 1950	France (Varilhes)		PS	SRC	21 December 2014	Resumption of the mandate by a former member of the Government	Kader Arif
Isère	1st	Olivier Véran	22 April 1980	France (Saint-Martin-d'Hères)		PS	SRC	5 April 2015	Resumption of the mandate by a former member of the Government	Geneviève Fioraso
Haute-Garonne	8th	Joël Aviragnet	16 June 1956	France (Encausse-les-Thermes)		PS	SRC	17 July 2015	Resumption of the mandate by a former member of the Government	Carole Delga
Isère	5th	François Brottes	31 March 1956	France (Valence)		PS	SRC	19 August 2015	Temporary mission extension	Pierre Ribeaud
Seine-Maritime	6th	Sandrine Hurel	4 August 1968	France (Lisieux)		PS	SRC	27 August 2015	Temporary mission extension	Marie Le Vern
Aisne	2nd	Xavier Bertrand	21 March 1965	France (Châlons-en-Champagne)		LR	LR	12 January 2016	Resignation (Elected President of Hauts-de-France)	Julien Dive
Yvelines	2nd	Valérie Pécresse	14 July 1967	France (Neuilly-sur-Seine)		LR	LR	20 January 2016	Resignation (Elected President of Île-de-France)	Pascal Thévenot
Nord	10th	Gérald Darmanin	11 October 1982	France (Valenciennes)		LR	LR	27 January 2016	Resignation (Elected Councillor of Hauts-de-France's Regional council)	Vincent Ledoux
Finistère	1st	Jean-Jacques Urvoas	19 September 1959	France (Brest)		PS	SRC	27 February 2016	Appointed to government	Marie-Thérèse Le Roy
Corrèze	1st	Sophie Dessus	24 September 1955	France (Suresnes)		PS	SRC	3 March 2016	Death	Alain Ballay
Bas-Rhin	1st	Armand Jung	13 December 1950	France (Théding)		PS	SRC	3 March 2016	Resignation (Health problem)	Éric Elkouby
Ain	3rd	Étienne Blanc	29 August 1954	France (Givors)		LR	LR	10 March 2016	Resignation (Elected 1st Vice president of Auvergne-Rhône-Alpes's Regional council)	Stéphanie Pernod-Beaudon
Seine-Maritime	9th	Estelle Grelier	22 June 1973	France (La Roche-sur-Yon)		PS	SRC	11 March 2016	Appointed to government	Jacques Dellerie
Loire-Atlantique	3rd	Jean-Marc Ayrault	25 January 1950	France (Maulévrier)		PS	SRC	11 March 2016	Appointed to government	Karine Daniel
Finistère	4th	Gwenegan Bui	27 July 1974	France (Vitry-sur-Seine)		PS	SRC	11 March 2016	Resumption of the mandate by a former member of the Government	Marylise Lebranchu
Tarn-et-Garonne	2nd	Jacques Moignard	8 August 1951	France (Montauban)		PS	RRDP	11 March 2016	Resumption of the mandate by a former member of the Government	Sylvia Pinel
Alpes-Maritimes	5th	Christian Estrosi	1 July 1955	France (Nice)		LR	LR	30 March 2016	Resignation (Elected President of Provence-Alpes-Côte d'Azur)	Marine Brenier
Moselle	9th	Anne Grommerch	11 December 1970	France (Thionville)		LR	LR	15 April 2016	Death	Patrick Weiten
