= 14th legislature of the French Fifth Republic =

2012–2017 sitting of the French Parliament

14th legislature of the French Fifth Republic XIV^{e} législature de la Cinquième République française

History
- Founded: 20 June 2012
- Disbanded: 20 June 2017
- Preceded by: 13th legislature
- Succeeded by: 15th legislature

Leadership
- President of the National Assembly: Claude Bartolone, PS
- Government: Ayrault II, PS–PRG–EELV
- Valls I, PS–PRG
- Valls II, PS–PRG–PÉ
- Cazeneuve, PS–PRG–PÉ
- Philippe I, LREM–MoDem

Structure
- Seats: 577 deputies
- Political groups: SER (284); LR (199); UDI (27); RRDP (18); GDR (15); NI (26); Vacant (8)

Elections
- Voting system: Two-round system
- Last election: 10 and 17 June 2012

The 14th legislature of the French Fifth Republic (French: XIV^{e} législature de la Cinquième République française) was the French Parliament elected in the 2012 French legislative election.

== Composition of the executive ==
=== Successive Presidents of the Republic ===
When the 14th legislature was installed, François Hollande had been President of the Republic for 36 days.

After a tumultuous first term, Hollande decided not to run for a second term. Emmanuel Macron succeeded him on 14 May 2017 following the presidential election of 2017.

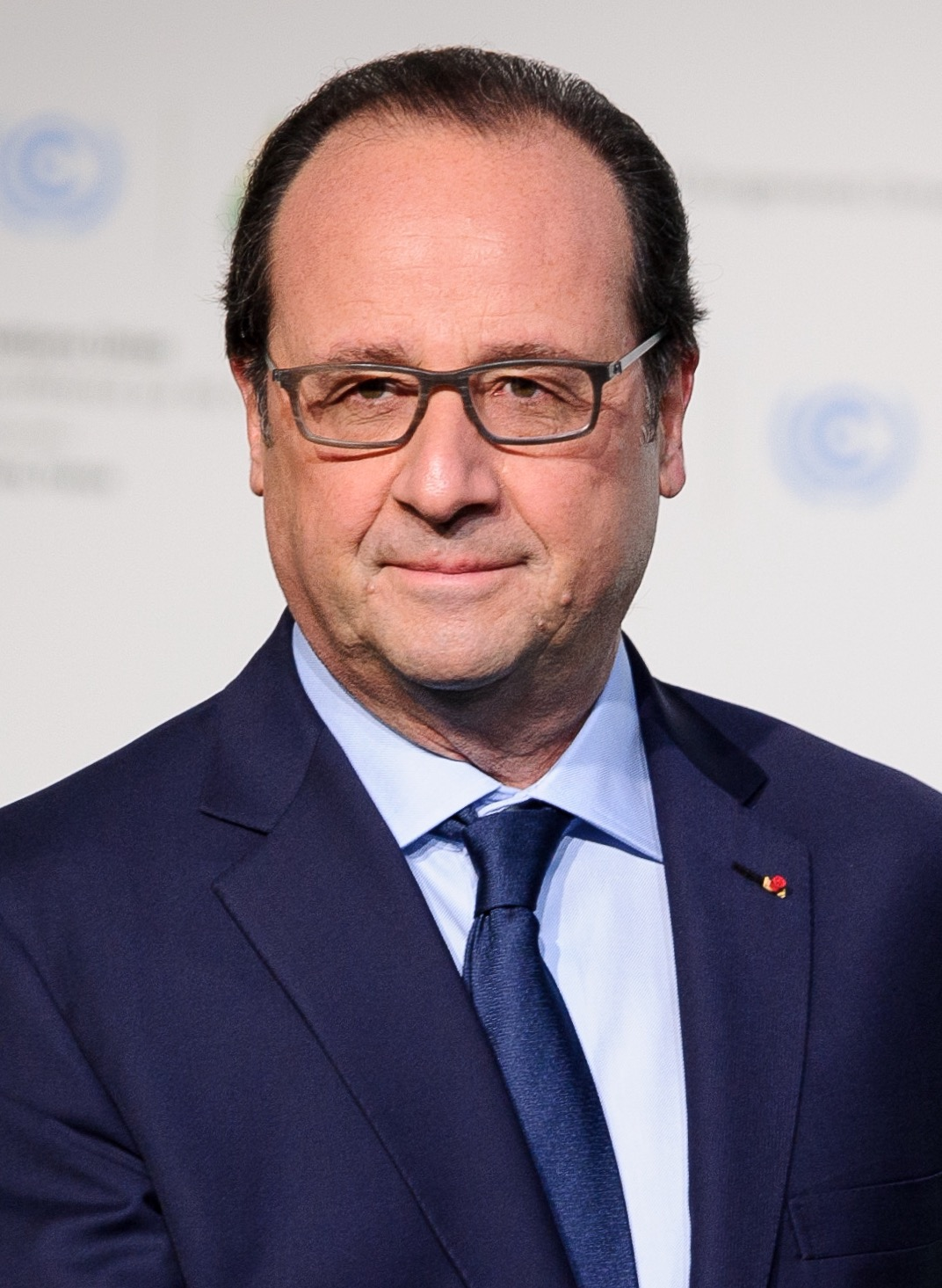
François Hollande,
president of the Republic
from 15 May 2012
to 14 May 2017.

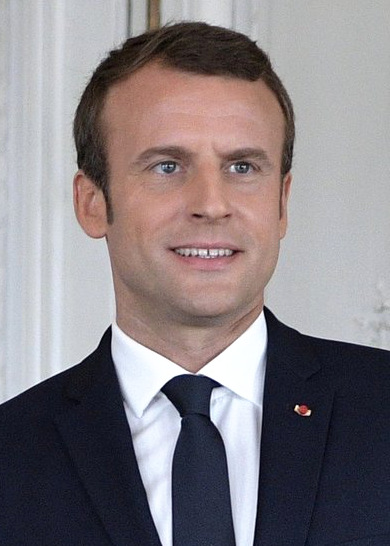
Emmanuel Macron,
president of the Republic
since 14 May 2017.

=== Prime Ministers and successive governments ===
François Hollande first reappointed Jean-Marc Ayrault as Prime Minister on June 20, 2012, which composes a single government. Manuel Valls is then named on March 31, 2014, which consists of two governments. Bernard Cazeneuve succeeds him on December 6, 2016 and will remain head of a single government until the election of Emmanuel Macron to the presidency of the Republic. The last government of the fourteenth legislature is that of Édouard Philippe, which is renewed following the parliamentary elections of June 2017.

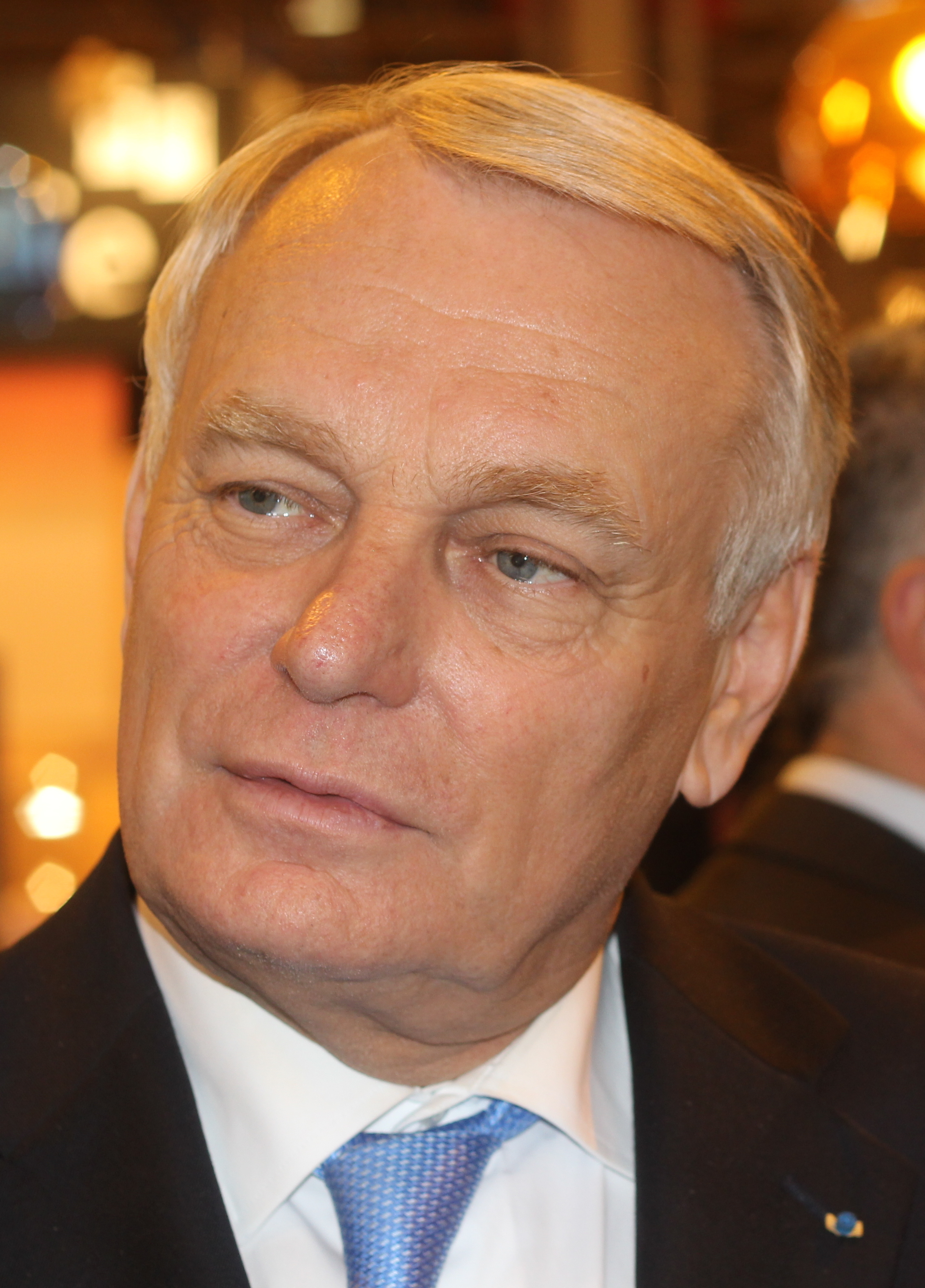
Jean-Marc Ayrault,
Prime Minister
from 15 May 2012
to 31 March 2014.

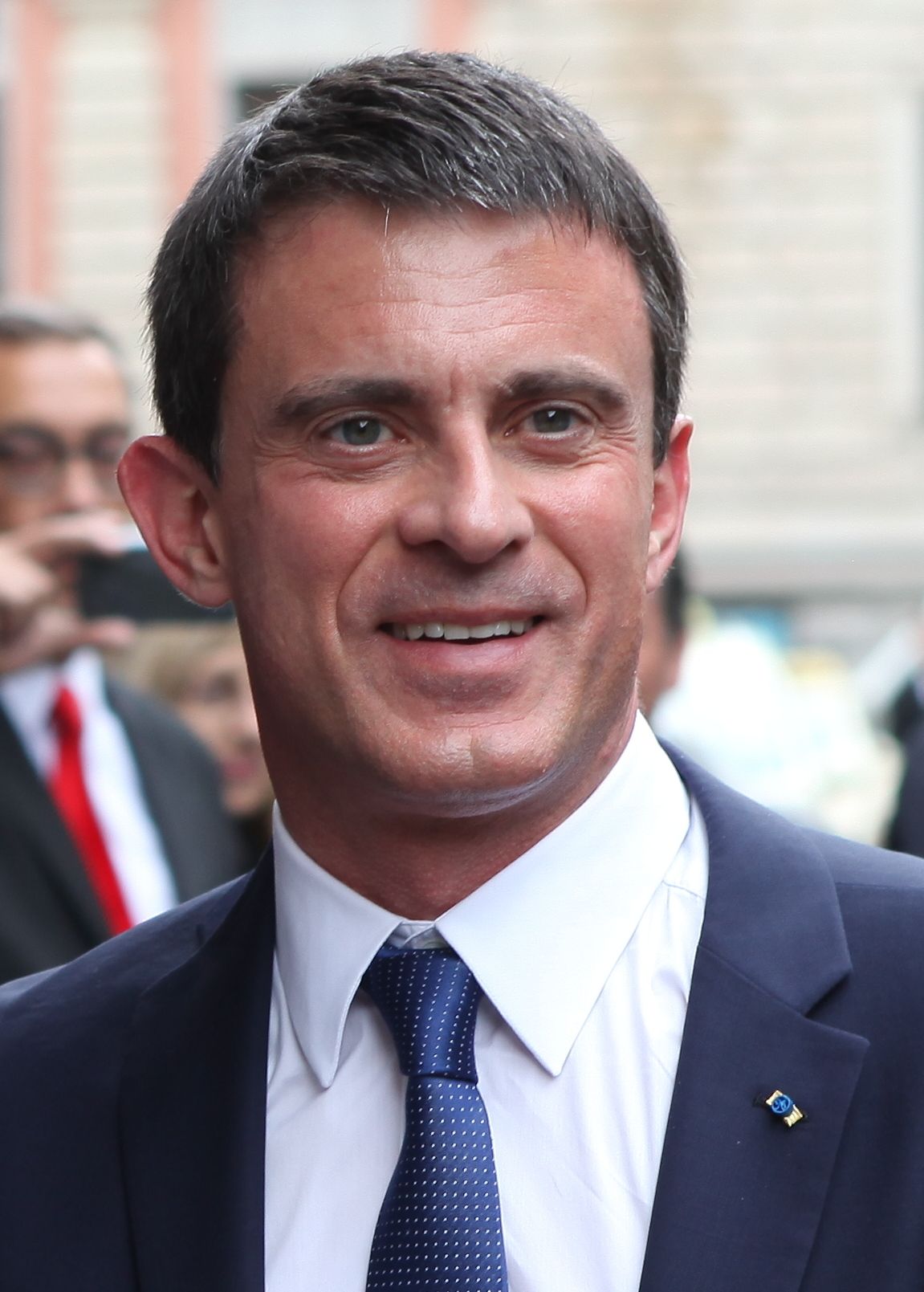
Manuel Valls,
Prime Minister
from 31 March 2014
to 6 December 2016.

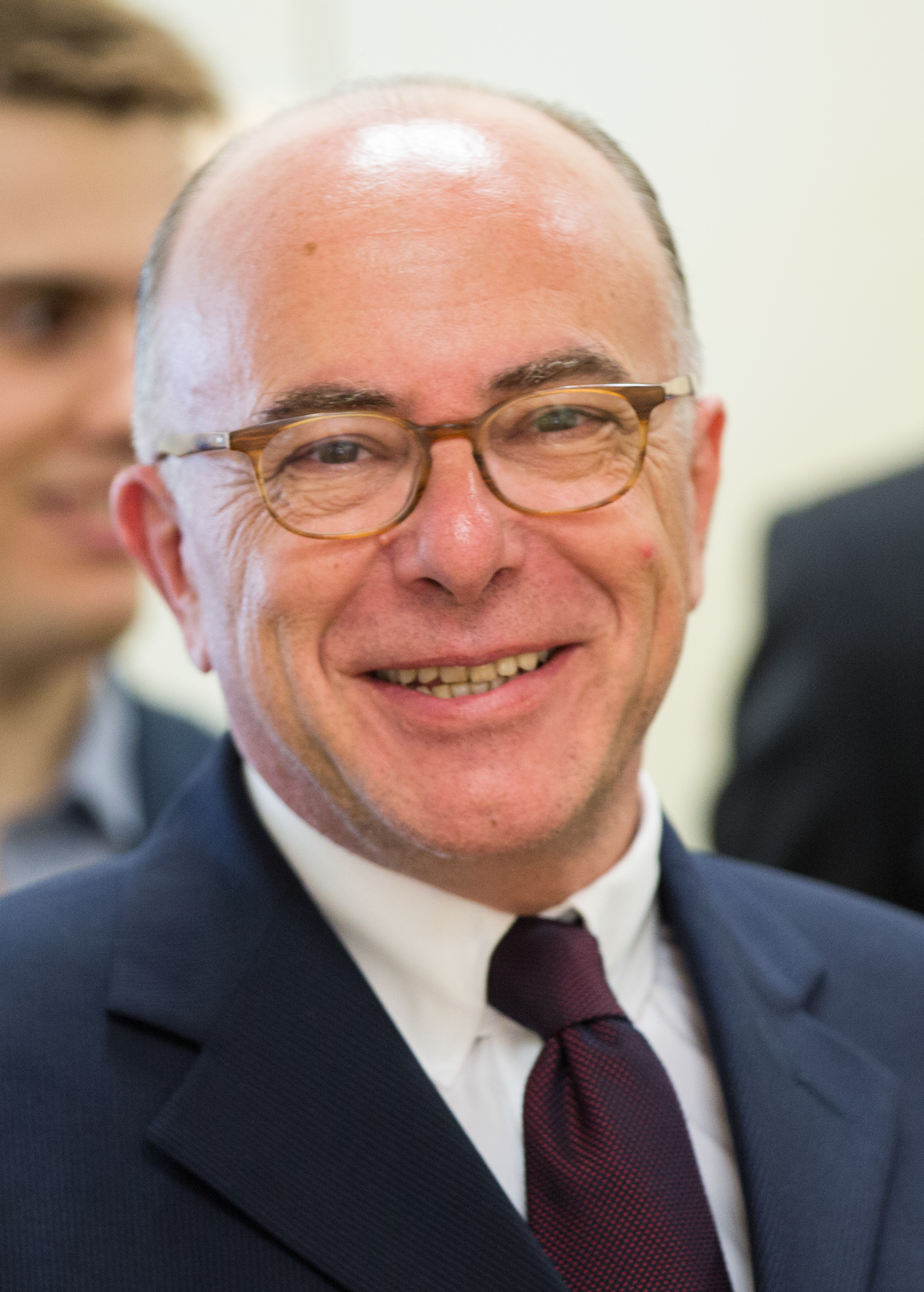
Bernard Cazeneuve,
Prime Minister
from 6 December 2016
to 10 May 2017.

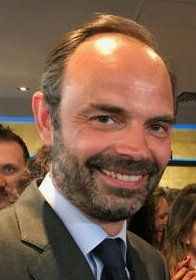
Édouard Philippe,
Prime Minister
since 15 May 2017.

== Composition of the National Assembly ==
155 women were elected or reelected and make up 26.86% of French MPs:

125 women MPs from left-wing parties. 29 women MPs from right-wing parties. 1 women MP from the Front National party.

The oldest member of the National Assembly is François Scellier, from the Radical Party, linked to the larger UMP conservative grouping. He represents the 6th Constituency of Val d'Oise and was 76 years old at the beginning of the current parliamentary term.

The youngest member of the National Assembly is Marion Maréchal-Le Pen from the Front National, the MP for the 3rd Constituency of Vaucluse. She was 22 years old at the beginning of the current parliamentary term and was actually the youngest ever MP elected under the French Fifth Republic.

=== Changes in composition ===
Members of the National Assembly who join the government are required to give up their seats to their substitutes (suppléants) a month after their appointment, as stipulated in the constitution. Should ministers quit the government, they recover their seat in the National Assembly from their substitute a month after their resignation. By-elections are held in the event of the annulation of electoral results or vacancies caused by resignations (in most circumstances not those related to the death of a deputy, in which case the substitute takes the seat if possible), except within the year before legislative elections.

=== By-elections ===
| Dates | Constituency | Incumbent deputy | Party | Elected deputy | Party | Reason for by-election |
|---|---|---|---|---|---|---|
| 9 Dec and 16 Dec 2012 | Val-de-Marne's 1st | Henri Plagnol | UDI | Sylvain Berrios | UMP | Election invalidated by the Constitutional Council |
| 9 Dec and 16 Dec 2012 | Hérault's 6th | Dolorès Roqué | PS | Élie Aboud | UMP | Election invalidated by the Constitutional Council |
| 9 Dec and 16 Dec 2012 | Hauts-de-Seine's 13th | Patrick Devedjian | UMP | Patrick Devedjian | UMP | Election invalidated by the Constitutional Council |
| 17 Mar and 24 Mar 2013 | Oise's 2nd | Jean-François Mancel | UMP | Jean-François Mancel | UMP | Election invalidated by the Constitutional Council |
| 17 Mar and 24 Mar 2013 | Wallis and Futuna's 1st | David Vergé | DVG | Napole Polutélé | DVD | Election invalidated by the Constitutional Council |
| 25 May and 8 Jun 2013 | French residents overseas's 1st | Corinne Narassiguin | PS | Frédéric Lefebvre | UMP | Election invalidated by the Constitutional Council |
| 26 May and 9 Jun 2013 | French residents overseas's 8th | Daphna Poznanski-Benhamou | PS | Meyer Habib | UDI | Election invalidated by the Constitutional Council |
| 16 Jun and 23 Jun 2013 | Lot-et-Garonne's 3rd | Jérôme Cahuzac | PS | Jean-Louis Costes | UMP | Resignation (Cahuzac affair) |
| 25 May and 1 Jun 2014 | Haute-Garonne's 3rd | Jean-Luc Moudenc | UMP | Laurence Arribagé | UMP | Resignation (Elected Mayor of Toulouse) |
| 14 Jun and 28 Jun 2014 | French Polynesia's 1st | Édouard Fritch | Tahoeraa | Maina Sage | Tahoeraa | Resignation (Elected Mayor of Pirae) |
| 22 Jun and 29 Jun 2014 | Nord's 21st | Jean-Louis Borloo | UDI | Laurent Degallaix | UDI | Resignation (Health problem) |
| 29 Jun 2014 | Saint-Pierre-et-Miquelon's 1st | Annick Girardin | PRG | Annick Girardin | PRG | Appointed to government and Resignation of Catherine Pen, her substitute (Health problem) |
| 7 Dec and 14 Dec 2014 | Aube's 3rd | François Baroin | UMP | Gérard Menuel | UMP | Resignation (Elected Senator) |
| 1 Feb and 8 Feb 2015 | Doubs's 4th | Pierre Moscovici | PS | Frédéric Barbier | PS | Resignation (Appointed European Commissioner) |
| 6 Sep and 13 Sep 2015 | Aveyron's 3rd | Alain Marc | UMP | Arnaud Viala | LR | Resignation (Elected Senator) |
| 13 Mar and 20 Mar 2016 | Aisne's 2nd | Xavier Bertrand | LR | Julien Dive | LR | Resignation (Elected President of Hauts-de-France) |
| 13 Mar and 20 Mar 2016 | Nord's 10th | Gérald Darmanin | LR | Vincent Ledoux | LR | Resignation (Elected Councillor of Hauts-de-France's Regional council) |
| 13 Mar and 20 Mar 2016 | Yvelines's 2nd | Valérie Pécresse | LR | Pascal Thévenot | LR | Resignation (Elected President of Île-de-France) |
| 17 Apr and 24 Apr 2016 | Loire-Atlantique's 3rd | Jean-Marc Ayrault | PS | Karine Daniel | PS | Appointed to government and Death of Jean-Pierre Fougerat, her substitute |
| 22 May and 29 May 2016 | Bas-Rhin's 1st | Armand Jung | PS | Éric Elkouby | PS | Resignation (Health problem) |
| 22 May and 29 May 2016 | Alpes-Maritimes's 5th | Christian Estrosi | LR | Marine Brenier | LR | Resignation (Elected President of Provence-Alpes-Côte d'Azur) |
| 5 Jun and 12 Jun 2016 | Ain's 3rd | Étienne Blanc | LR | Stéphanie Pernod-Beaudon | LR | Resignation (Elected Vice-President of Auvergne-Rhône-Alpes) |

== Parliamentary Groups ==
Parliamentary Groups of the French National Assembly
| Group | Number of deputies as of 9 June 2013 + deputies from linked parties | Group President |
|---|---|---|
| Democratic and Republican Left | 15 | André Chassaigne |
| Socialist, Radical, Citizen and Miscellaneous Left | 275+17 | Bruno Le Roux |
| Radical, Republican, Democratic, Progressive | 16 | Roger-Gérard Schwartzenberg |
| Ecologist Group | 17 | François de Rugy |
| Union of Democrats and Independents | 31 | Jean-Louis Borloo |
| Union for a Popular Majority Group | 187+10 | Christian Jacob |
| Deputies not belonging to a group | 8 | n/a |

=== Chairmen of committees of the National Assembly ===
| Committee | Chairman | Groupe |
|---|---|---|
| Education and Cultural Affairs Committee | Patrick Bloche | SRC |
| Economic Affairs Committee | François Brottes | SRC |
| Foreign Affairs Committee | Élisabeth Guigou | SRC |
| Social Affairs Committee | Catherine Lemorton | SRC |
| National Defence and Armed Forces Committee | Patricia Adam | SRC |
| Sustainable Development and Local Government Committee | Jean-Paul Chanteguet | SRC |
| Finance, General Economy and Budget Committee | Gilles Carrez | UMP |
| Constitutional Law, Legislation and General Administration Committee | Jean-Jacques Urvoas | SRC |
