= Catherine Pen =

French politician from Saint Pierre and Miquelon

Member of the National Assembly for Saint-Pierre-et-Miquelon's 1st constituency
- In office 10 May 2014 – 10 May 2014
- Preceded by: Annick Girardin
- Succeeded by: Annick Girardin

Personal details
- Born: May 9, 1954 (age 72) Saint Pierre and Miquelon
- Party: unregistered

Catherine Pen is a French politician who served as the deputy in the 14th Legislature of the National Assembly for the French overseas department of Saint Pierre and Miquelon.

== Biography ==
Pen was born in Saint Pierre and Miquelon on 9 May 1954. She served as a substitute for Member of Parliament Annick Girardin in the 2007 and 2012 legislative elections.

On 10 May 2014, Girardin's term as MP automatically expired. As her substitute, Pen automatically assumed office at midnight. For several hours, Pen was the acting deputy of Saint Pierre et Miquelon's 1st constituency as an unregistered MP. However, that same day, she submitted her letter of resignation to Claude Bartolone, President of the National Assembly, stating that she was unable to act as a Member of Parliament for personal reasons.

Girardin re-assumed office, and her new substitute became Stéphane Claireaux.
