= Valls government =

Valls Government may refer to:

- First Valls government, the French government under President François Hollande from March to August 2014
- Second Valls government, the French government under President François Hollande from August 2014 to 2016
