= Annick Girardin =

French politician

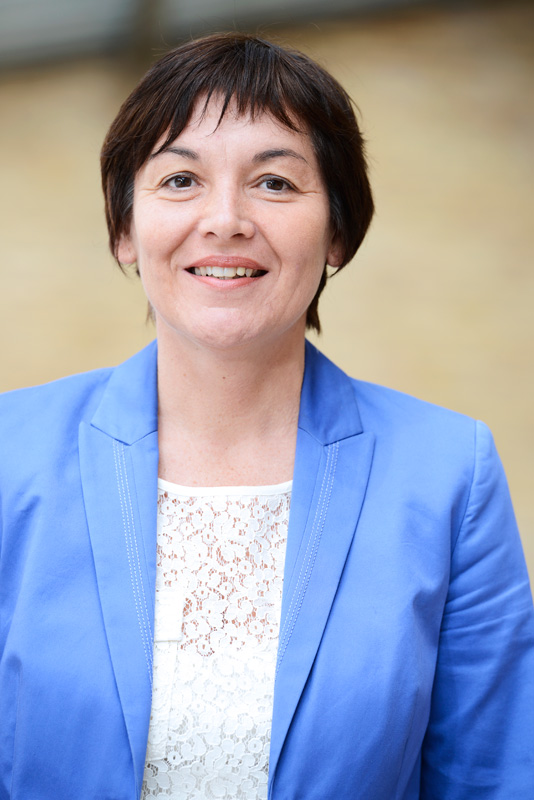

Member of Senate
- In office 2 October 2023 – 13 September 2024
- Preceded by: Stéphane Artano
- Parliamentary group: RDSE
- Constituency: Saint-Pierre-et-Miquelon

Minister of the Sea
- In office 6 July 2020 – 20 May 2022
- President: Emmanuel Macron
- Prime Minister: Jean Castex
- Preceded by: Office created
- Succeeded by: Justine Benin

Minister of Overseas Territories
- In office 17 May 2017 – 6 July 2020
- President: Emmanuel Macron
- Prime Minister: Édouard Philippe
- Preceded by: Ericka Bareigts
- Succeeded by: Sébastien Lecornu

Minister of Public Service
- In office 11 February 2016 – 10 May 2017
- President: François Hollande
- Prime Minister: Manuel Valls; Bernard Cazeneuve
- Preceded by: Marylise Lebranchu
- Succeeded by: Gérald Darmanin

Secretary of State for Development and Francophonie
- In office 9 April 2014 – 11 February 2016
- President: François Hollande
- Prime Minister: Manuel Valls
- Preceded by: Pascal Canfin (Delegated Minister for Development); Yamina Benguigui (Delegated Minister for Francophonie)
- Succeeded by: André Vallini

Member of the National Assembly
- In office 21 June 2017 – 21 July 2017
- Preceded by: Stéphane Claireaux
- Succeeded by: Stéphane Claireaux
- Parliamentary group: affiliated LREM
- Constituency: Saint-Pierre-et-Miquelon's 1st constituency
- In office 30 June 2014 – 29 July 2014
- Preceded by: Catherine Pen
- Succeeded by: Stéphane Claireaux
- Parliamentary group: RRDP
- Constituency: Saint-Pierre-et-Miquelon's 1st constituency
- In office 20 June 2007 – 9 May 2014
- Preceded by: Gérard Grignon
- Succeeded by: Catherine Pen
- Parliamentary group: affiliated SRC (2007-2012; RRDP (2012-2014)
- Constituency: Saint-Pierre-et-Miquelon's 1st constituency

Member of the Territorial Council of Saint Pierre and Miquelon
- In office 28 March 2000 – 19 March 2017

Personal details
- Born: Annick Andrée Danièle Girardin; 3 August 1964 (age 61) Saint-Malo, Ille-et-Vilaine, France
- Party: Rad
- Relatives: Henri Claireaux (great-uncle)
- Profession: Youth worker

Annick Girardin (French pronunciation: [anik ʒiʁaʁdɛ̃]; born 3 August 1964) is a French politician of the Radical Party who served as Minister of the Sea in the government of Prime Minister Jean Castex (2020–2022), Minister of Overseas France in the government of Prime Minister Édouard Philippe (2017–2020) and Junior Minister for Development and Francophonie in the government of Prime Minister Manuel Valls (2014–2018). She had represented the islands of Saint-Pierre and Miquelon in the French Parliament, in National Assembly from 2007 to 2014, now in the Senate replacing Jean-Marc Bruel as a RDSE Senator.

== Early life and education ==
A great-niece of the councilor of Saint-Pierre and senator Henri Claireaux, Girardin is the eldest of four siblings; her mother was a housewife and her father, after fishing activities, ran a family bakery business. She lived until the age of six at her grandfather's, a chief of public works. She became a mother at the age of sixteen, giving birth to a girl, future weather presenter and host of a cooking show on the local TV channel. Her companion is Jean-François Vigneau, territorial advisor of Saint Pierre and Miquelon who succeeds in 2016 to the advisory commission of local public services.

Girardin holds the diploma of socio-cultural animator.

In March 2016, journalists Sylvie Koffi and Shaman Dolpi devoted a 52-minute documentary film, "Annick, the pirate of hope", a co-production France Télévisions and AYA Reportage, with the participation of TV5Monde. The film, which looks back on its journey, took six months of filming, from Saint-Malo to Saint Pierre and Miquelon via Mali and Tunisia.

== Political career ==
Girardin is a member of the Radical Party of the Left (PRG). She is also a member of the PRG's executive board since 2012. She was a member of Territorial Council of Saint Pierre and Miquelon from March 2000 to April 2016. She was also a Municipal councillor of Saint-Pierre from 18 March 2001 to 15 February 2002.

During the French Socialist Party presidential primary of 2017, she supports Sylvia Pinel. In the presidential election of 2017, she supported the En Marche! candidate, Emmanuel Macron.

=== Member of the National Assembly ===
In the French legislative elections that took place on 9 June and 16 June 2002 to elect the 12th National Assembly of the Fifth Republic, Girardin was the candidate for the Radical Party of the Left in the Saint-Pierre-et-Miquelon constituency. Obtaining 14.8% of the vote on 9 June, she was eliminated from the second round.

Five years later, in the 2007 French legislative elections, Girardin obtained 31.1% in the first round, only 132 votes behind the incumbent. In the second round, one week later, she got 51.27% of the vote and was elected deputy for the Radical Party of the Left.

In the 2012 French legislative elections, Girardin was re-elected in the first round with 65.53%. Her substitute was Catherine Pen.

In the 2017 French legislative elections, Girardin was re-elected with 51.87%. Her substitute was Stéphane Claireaux.

=== Member of the Government ===
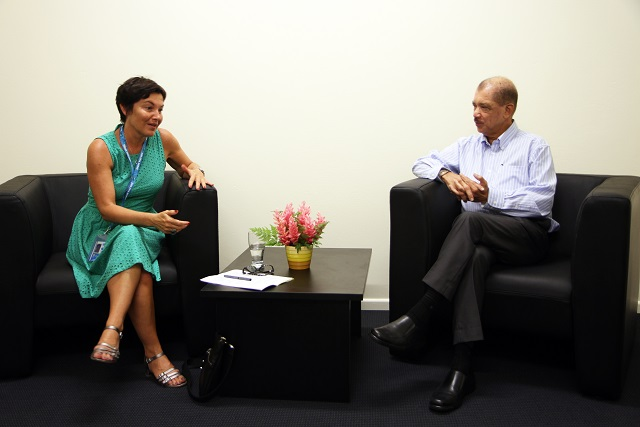
Annick Girardin and the Seychelles President James Michel in 2014

==== Secretary of State Development and Francophonie ====
On 9 April 2014, Girardin was appointed Secretary of State Development and Francophonie in the Valls Cabinet. Catherine Pen, her substitute, therefore succeeded her as deputy but resigned on the same day due to health problems. A by-election was then organised and Annick Girardin was again a candidate for the National Assembly. She won on the first electoral round on 29 June 2014. She retained the position of Secretary of State and her substitute Stéphane Claireaux became the deputy on 30 July 2014.

On 27 June 2014, Girardin was appointed president François Hollande's "personal representative" to the Organisation internationale de la Francophonie.

==== Minister of Public Service ====
Girardin was appointed Minister of Public Service in the Second Valls government, replacing Marylise Lebranchu, during the reshuffle of 11 February 2016.

On 9 December 2016, Émile Zuccarelli presented Girardin with the "Laïcité and public service" report containing twenty proposals. The minister then undertook to implement six priority: mandatory training of officials to secularism, a secular referent in each administration, the creation of an Internet portal on the subject, a day of exchange on secularism and a brochure given to public officials when they take office.

==== Minister of Overseas Territories ====
On 17 May 2017, Girardin was appointed Minister of Overseas Territories in the Édouard Philippe government. Candidate in the 2017 legislative election of Saint Pierre and Miquelon, she was reelected in the second round with 51.87% of the vote. She sat for a month in the National Assembly, where she was a member of the La République en marche group. She keeps her ministry.

In September 2017, Girardin managed the relief work following the destruction caused by hurricane Irma in Saint-Martin and Saint-Barthélemy.

In March 2018, Girardin had to deal with social unrest in Mayotte, the inhabitants protesting against illegal immigration and delinquency. She went to the island on 12 March. On 15 May 2018, Girardin presented her catch-up plan for Mayotte. It was broken down into six chapters (security, justice and immigration, health, social, education and training, housing, infrastructure, state institutions and services), 53 commitments and 125 actions for a total cost of 1.3 billion euros out of the national education budget.

In the Socialist Party's primaries, Girardin endorsed Sylvia Pinel as the party's candidate in the 2017 French presidential election.
