= Saint Pierre and Miquelon's 1st constituency =

Constituency of the French Fifth Republic

1st constituency of Saint-Pierre-et-Miquelon
- inline Constituency of the National Assembly of France

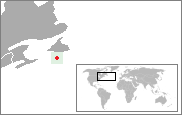
- Deputy: Stéphane Lenormand; DVD
- Department: Saint-Pierre-et-Miquelon
- Cantons: Saint-Pierre, Miquelon-Langlade

The 1st constituency of Saint-Pierre-et-Miquelon is a French legislative constituency on the islands of Saint-Pierre-et-Miquelon. It is the islands' only constituency; it is also the least populated constituency in France, with only 5,997 inhabitants in 2017.

== Deputies ==
Election	Member	Party
1945	Henri Debidour	UDSR
1946	Henri Debidour	UDSR
1946	Dominique-Antoine Laurelli	MRP
1947	Dominique-Antoine Laurelli	MRP
1951	Alain Savary	SFIO
1956	Alain Savary	SFIO
1958	Dominique-Antoine Laurelli	MRP
1962	Albert Briand	DVD
1964	Albert Briand	DVD
1967	Jacques-Philippe Vendroux	UDR
1968	Jacques-Philippe Vendroux	UDR
1973	Frédéric Gabriel	DVD
1978	Marc Plantegenest	DVG
1981	Albert Pen	PS
1986	Proportional representation - no election by constituency	
1988	Gérard Grignon	DVD
1993	Gérard Grignon	DVD
1997	Gérard Grignon	DVD
2002	Gérard Grignon	DVD
2007	Annick Girardin	PRG
2012	Annick Girardin	PRG
2014	Catherine Pen	PRG
2014	Annick Girardin	PRG
2014	Stéphane Claireaux	PRG
2017	Annick Girardin	PRG
2017	Stéphane Claireaux	PRG
2022	Stéphane Lenormand	DVD
2024	Stéphane Lenormand	DVD

== Election results ==
=== 2024 ===
Candidate	Party	First round		Second round	
Candidate	Party	Votes	%	Votes	%
Stéphane Lenormand	DVD	1,184	43.09	1,665	61.74
Frédéric Beaumont	PS	464	16.89	1,032	38.26
Marion Letournel	LFI	409	14.88		
Patrick Lebailly	DVG	400	14.56		
Patricia Chagnon	RN	291	10.59		
Valid votes		2,748	100.00	2,697	100.00
Blank votes		37	1.32	69	2.46
Null votes		22	0.78	44	1.57
Turnout		2,807	55.38	2,810	55.45
Abstentions		2,262	44.62	2,258	44.55
Registered voters		5,069		5,068	
Result		DVD HOLD			

=== 2022 ===
Legislative Election 2022: Saint-Pierre-et-Miquelon's 1st constituency
Party	Candidate	Votes	%	±%
DVD	Stéphane Lenormand	856	32.39	−9.2
LFI	Olivier Gaston	782	29.59	+24.57
DVG	Patrick Lebailly	532	20.13	
PRG	Dominica Revert-Michel	473	17.90	−23.69
Turnout		2,643	53.45	
2nd round result
DVD	Stéphane Lenormand	1,329	50.36	+2.23
LFI	Olivier Gaston	1,310	49.64	
Turnout				
DVD gain from PRG				

=== 2017 ===
Legislative Election 2017: Saint-Pierre-et-Miquelon 1st - 2nd round
Party	Candidate	Votes	%	±%
PRG	Annick Girardin	1,886	51.87	
DVD	Stéphane Lenormand	1,750	48.13	
Turnout		3,748	75.35	
PRG hold		Swing		

Legislative Election 2017: Saint-Pierre-et-Miquelon 1st - 1st round
Party	Candidate	Votes	%	±%
DVD	Stéphane Lenormand	1,209	41.59	
PRG	Annick Girardin	1,209	41.59	
DVD	Denis Vigneau-Dugue	314	10.80	
LFI	Robert Langlois	146	5.02	
FN	Roger Rode	29	1.00	
Turnout		2,957	59.45	

=== 2014 by-election ===
On 9 April 2014, Annick Girardin was appointed Secretary of State for Development and Francophonie in the cabinet of Prime Minister Manuel Valls. Catherine Pen, her suppléant (substitute), took over the seat but resigned on the same day due to health problems. A by-election was called and Girardin was again a candidate. She won on the first round on 29 June 2014. She kept her ministerial post and her substitute Stéphane Claireaux took the seat on 30 July.

By-election, 2014: Saint-Pierre-et-Miquelon 1st
Party	Candidate	Votes	%	±%
PRG	Annick Girardin	1,342	59.91	
DVD	François Zimmermann	758	33.84	
FN	Roger Rode	87	3.88	
PP	Pierre Magnin	53	2.37	
Turnout		2,240		
PRG hold		Swing		

=== 2012 ===
Legislative Election 2012: Saint-Pierre-et-Miquelon 1st
Party	Candidate	Votes	%	±%
PRG	Annick Girardin	1,674	65.52	
DVD	Bernard Le Soavec	378	14.79	
UMP	François Zimmermann	289	11.31	
FN	Roger Rode	116	4.54	
CNIP	Thierry Abraham	98	3.84	
Turnout		2,636	53.51	
PRG hold		Swing		

=== 2007 ===
Legislative Election 2007: Saint-Pierre-et-Miquelon 1st - 2nd round
Party	Candidate	Votes	%	±%
PRG	Annick Girardin	1,816	51.27	
DVD	Gérard Grignon	1,726	48.73	
Turnout		3,740	75.97	
PRG gain from DVD		Swing		

Legislative Election 2007: Saint-Pierre-et-Miquelon 1st - 1st round
Party	Candidate	Votes	%	±%
DVD	Gérard Grignon	1,098	35.31	
PRG	Annick Girardin	966	31.06	
PS	Karine Claireaux	463	14.89	
PS	Marc Plantegenest	377	12.12	
DVD	Bernard Le Soavec	206	6.62	
Turnout		3,233	65.66	

=== 2002 ===
Legislative Election 2002: Saint-Pierre-et-Miquelon 1st - 2nd round
Party	Candidate	Votes	%	±%
DVD	Gérard Grignon	2,356	69.17	
PS	Karine Claireaux	1,050	30.83	
Turnout		3,603	74.72	
DVD hold		Swing		

Legislative Election 2002: Saint-Pierre-et-Miquelon 1st - 1st round
Party	Candidate	Votes	%	±%
DVD	Gérard Grignon	1,388	44.04	
PS	Karine Claireaux	608	19.29	
PRG	Annick Girardin	465	14.75	
DVG	André Urtizberea	330	10.47	
DVD	Bernard Le Soavec	218	6.92	
DVD	Jacques-Bertrand Gauvain	107	3.39	
DVD	Jean-Marc Gutelle	22	0.70	
MNR	Annick Perrin-Jassy	14	0.44	
Turnout		3,233	65.66	

=== 1997 ===
Legislative Election 1997: Saint-Pierre-et-Miquelon 1st - 2nd round
Party	Candidate	Votes	%	±%
DVD	Gérard Grignon	1,882	52.2	
PS	Marc Plantegenest	1,723	47.8	
Turnout		3,605		
DVD hold		Swing		

Legislative Election 1997: Saint-Pierre-et-Miquelon 1st - 1st round
Party	Candidate	Votes	%	±%
DVD	Gérard Grignon	1,509	46.5	
PS	Albert Pen	869	26.8	
DVG	Marc Plantegenest	867	26.7	
Turnout		3,245		

== Sources ==
- Official results of French elections from 1998: "Résultats électoraux officiels en France" (in French).
