= Ayrault government =

36th Government of the French Fifth Republic

Ayrault governments
- 35th and 36th Government of France

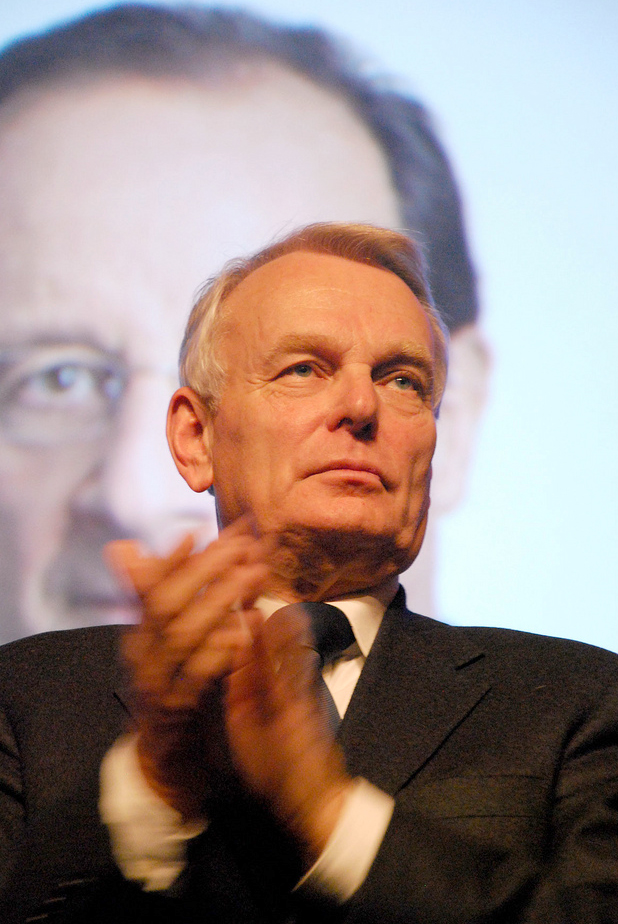
- Jean-Marc Ayrault
- Date formed: 16 May 2012
- Date dissolved: 9 March 2014

People and organisations
- Head of state: François Hollande
- Head of government: Jean-Marc Ayrault
- No. of ministers: 20
- Member parties: Socialist Party; EELV; Radical Party of the Left; Walwari
- Status in legislature: Majority

History
- Predecessor: Third Fillon government
- Successor: First Valls government

The Ayrault government was the 35th and 36th governments in the Fifth Republic of France, and headed by Jean-Marc Ayrault. The first Ayrault government was formed on 16 May 2012 by the presidential decree of President François Hollande. It was composed of members from the Socialist Party (30), the EELV (2) and the Radical Party of the Left (2). This was the first French government to respect gender equality, with equal male and female posts except the Prime Minister. It lasted one month, until the June legislative elections, after which Ayrault submitted his resignation.

Following the legislative victory, President Hollande immediately charged him with forming a new government, under Article 8 of the French Constitution. The second Ayrault government (cabinet #36) began on 18 June 2012.

Following a landslide defeat in the French mayoral elections, the second Ayrault government was dissolved on 31 March 2014. Manuel Valls was chosen by Hollande to form the next cabinet.

== Prime minister ==
Post	Name	Party
Prime Minister	Jean-Marc Ayrault	PS

== Ministers ==
	Post	Name	Party
	Minister of Foreign Affairs	Laurent Fabius	PS
	Minister of National Education	Vincent Peillon	PS
	Minister of Justice; Keeper of the Seals	Christiane Taubira	Walwari (app. PRG)
	Minister of the Economy and Finances	Pierre Moscovici	PS
	Minister of Social Affairs and Health	Marisol Touraine	PS
	Minister of Territorial and Housing Equality	Cécile Duflot	EELV
	Minister of the Interior	Manuel Valls	PS
	Minister of Foreign Trade	Nicole Bricq	PS
	Minister of Productive Recovery	Arnaud Montebourg	PS
Delphine Batho	Minister for Ecology, Sustainable Development and Energy	Delphine Batho (until 2 July 2013); Philippe Martin (since 2 July 2013)	PS
	Minister of Labour, Employment, Vocational Training and Social Dialogue	Michel Sapin	PS
	Minister of Defence	Jean-Yves Le Drian	PS
	Minister of Culture and Communication	Aurélie Filippetti	PS
	Minister of Higher Education and Research	Geneviève Fioraso	PS
	Minister of Women's Rights; Spokesperson of the Government	Najat Vallaud-Belkacem	PS
	Minister of Agriculture, Food and Forestry	Stéphane Le Foll	PS
	Minister of State Reform, Decentralisation and Public Service	Marylise Lebranchu	PS
	Minister of Overseas France	Victorin Lurel	PS
	Minister of Crafts, Commerce and Tourism	Sylvia Pinel	PRG
	Minister of Sports, Youth, Popular Education and Community Life	Valérie Fourneyron	PS

== Junior Ministers ==
Post	Ministry	Name	Party
Minister for the Budget	Economy and Finances	Jérôme Cahuzac (until 19 March 2013); Bernard Cazeneuve (since 19 March 2013)	PS
Minister for Educational Success	National Education	George Pau-Langevin	PS
Minister for Relations with Parliament	Prime Minister	Alain Vidalies	PS
Minister for the City	Territorial and Housing Equality	François Lamy	PS
Minister for European Affairs	Foreign Affairs	Thierry Repentin	PS
Minister for Seniors and Dependents	Social Affairs and Health	Michèle Delaunay	PS
Minister for Social Economy, Solidarity and Consumption	Economy and Finances	Benoît Hamon	PS
Minister for the Family	Social Affairs and Health	Dominique Bertinotti	PS
Minister for the Disabled and the Fight against Exclusion	Social Affairs and Health	Marie-Arlette Carlotti	PS
Minister for Development	Foreign Affairs	Pascal Canfin	EELV
Minister for Vocational Training and Apprenticeships	Labour, Employment, Vocational Training and Social Dialogue	Thierry Repentin	PS
Minister for Francophones	Foreign Affairs	Yamina Benguigui	PS
Minister for Transport, the Sea and Fisheries	Ecology, Sustainable Development and Energy	Frédéric Cuvillier	PS
Minister for Small and Medium Enterprises, Innovation and Digital Economy	Productive Recovery	Fleur Pellerin	PS
Minister for Veterans	Defence	Kader Arif	PS
Minister for Decentralisation	State Reform, Decentralisation and Public Service	Anne-Marie Escoffier	PRG
Minister for Food	Agriculture, Food and Forestry	Guillaume Garot	PS
Minister for French Expatriates	Foreign Affairs	Hélène Conway-Mouret	PS

== Roster changes ==
- On 19 March 2013, Jérôme Cahuzac, Minister for the Budget, resigned following the opening of a judicial inquiry into money laundering, known as the Cahuzac affair. He was succeeded by Bernard Cazeneuve.
- On 2 July 2013, François Hollande terminated Delphine Batho, Minister for Ecology, Sustainable Development and Energy, after she gave an interview contesting the government's budget choices. She was replaced by Philippe Martin.

Preceded by Third Fillon government	Government of France; 2012–2014	Succeeded by First Valls government
