= Radical, Republican, Democratic and Progressive =

Left progressive group in the French parliament

The Radical, républicain, démocrate et progressiste (English: Radical, Republicain, Democratic and Progressist, RRDP) is a French parliamentary group formed on June 26, 2012. It brought together the Radical Party of the Left and some of the various Deputies from more minor left wing parties, or independents. Roger-Gérard Schwartzenberg is the chairman.

== Members ==
- Radical Party of the Left : 12 members
  - Roger-Gérard Schwartzenberg (Chairman)
  - Gérard Charasse
  - Stéphane Claireaux
  - Jeanine Dubié
  - Paul Giacobbi
  - Joël Giraud
  - Jacques Krabal
  - Jean-Pierre Maggi
  - Dominique Orliac
  - Sylvia Pinel
  - Stéphane Saint-André
  - Alain Tourret
- Socialist Party of France : 1 member
  - Jérôme Lambert
- Democratic Movement : 1 member
  - Thierry Robert
- Progressive Unitary Movement : 1 member
  - Jean-Noël Carpentier
- United Guadeloupe, Socialism and Realities : 1 member
  - Ary Chalus
- Miscellaneous Left : 1 member
  - Olivier Falorni
