= Stéphane Claireaux =

French politician

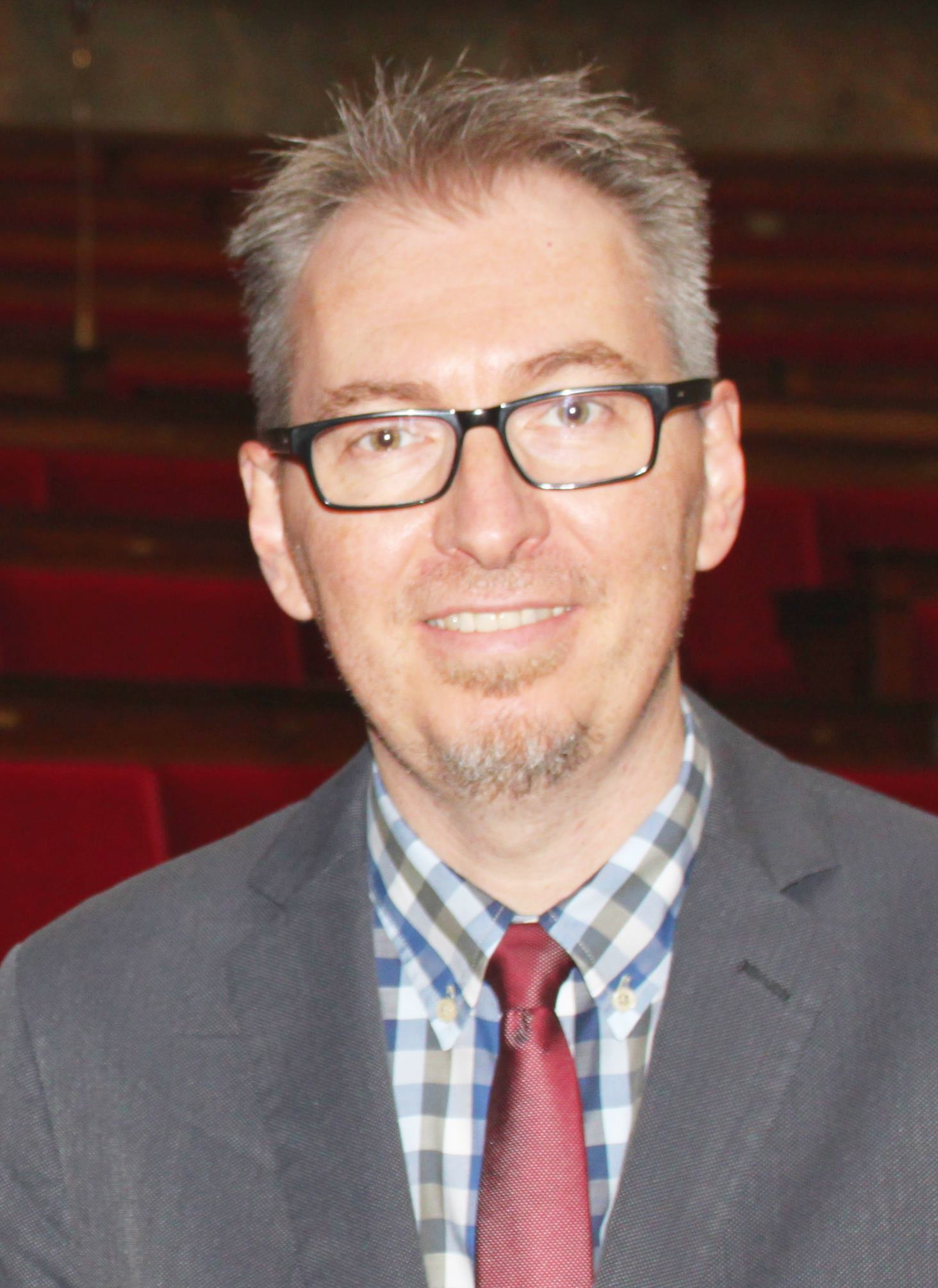
- Stéphane Claireaux in 2014

Deputy of the French National Assembly for Saint-Pierre-et-Miquelon's 1st constituency
- In office 2014–2022
- Preceded by: Annick Girardin
- Succeeded by: Stéphane Lenormand

Personal details
- Born: 23 June 1964 (age 61)
- Party: Radical Movement (–2017); La République En Marche! (2017–)

Stéphane Claireaux (born 23 June 1964) is a French politician. He has been Member of Parliament for Saint-Pierre-et-Miquelon's 1st constituency since 2014, and served until 2022. Formerly of the Radical Movement, he has been a member of the ruling La République En Marche! since 2017.

== Assault ==
During a protest against the COVID-19 vaccine pass in Saint-Pierre-et-Miquelon, demonstrators attacked the deputy by throwing seaweed, stones, and other projectiles at him while he was outside his home on his front porch. Claireaux stated that he was going to file a complaint. Emmanuel Macron denounced the "intolerable" and "unacceptable" aggression, and a number of elected officials recounted similar experiences.
