= First Valls government =

37th Government of the French Fifth Republic

- 37th Government of France

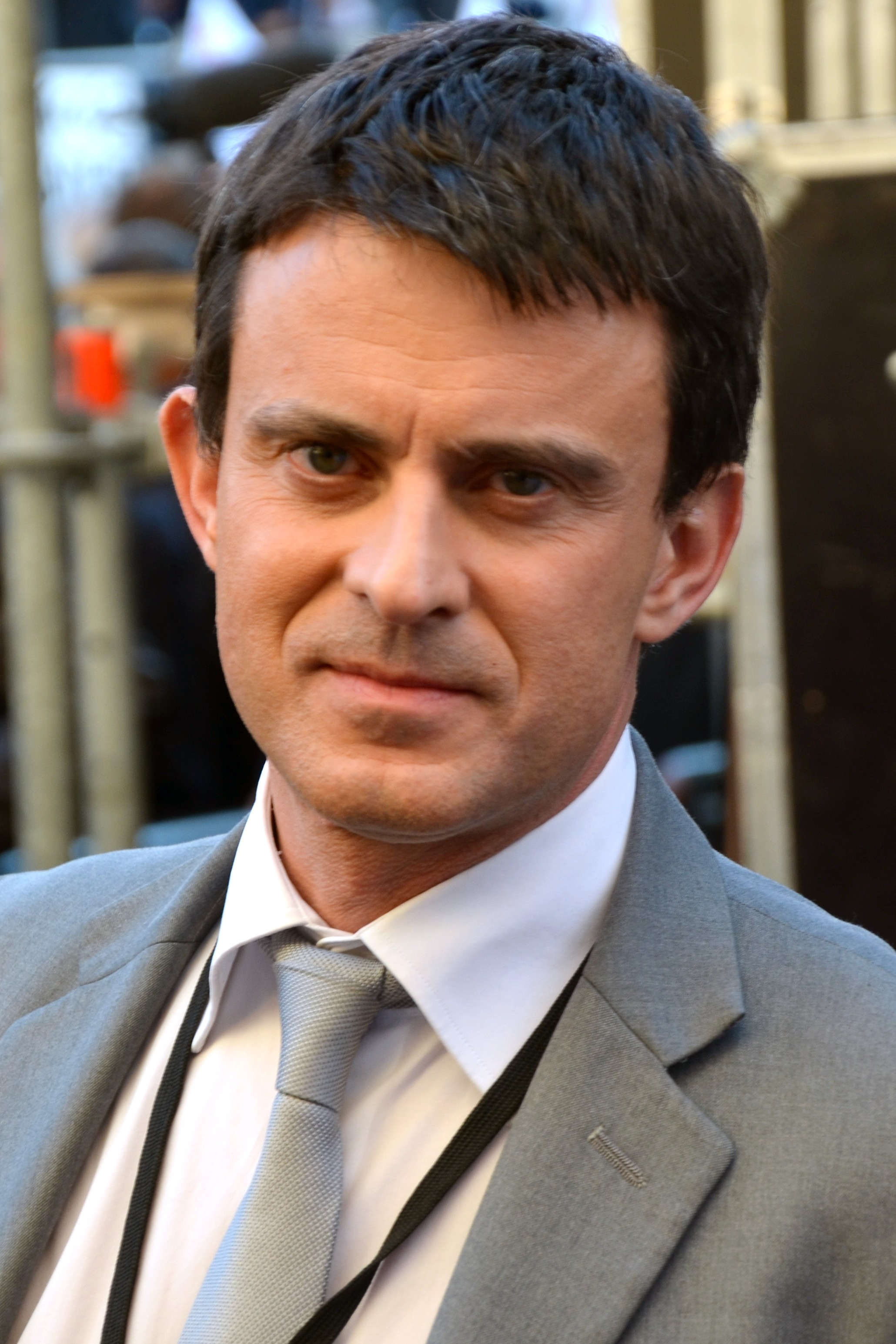
- Manuel Valls
- Date formed: 31 March 2014
- Date dissolved: 25 August 2014

People and organisations
- Head of state: François Hollande
- Head of government: Manuel Valls
- No. of ministers: 16
- Member parties: Socialist Party; Radical Party of the Left; Walwari
- Status in legislature: Majority

History
- Predecessor: Second Ayrault government
- Successor: Second Valls government

The First Valls government was the thirty-seventh government in the Fifth Republic of France. It was led by Manuel Valls, who was appointed prime minister of France on 31 March 2014. It was composed of 15 ministers from the Socialist Party (PS) and two from the Radical Party of the Left (PRG). It was the third cabinet declared by President Hollande and replaced the second Ayrault Cabinet. It was established following the 2014 French municipal elections.

Europe Ecology – The Greens, who had been part of the Ayrault Cabinet, chose not to be part of the cabinet. The Socialist Party, with 290 representatives, and the Radical Party of the Left, with 16 representatives, together have 306 of the 577 representatives in the National Assembly.

The cabinet was smaller than the preceding Ayrault Cabinet, and one of the smallest of the fifth republic, having 16 full ministers as opposed to the 20 in the Ayrault Cabinet.

Valls came from the position as minister of the interior, and 14 other ministers also held positions as ministers or junior ministers in the outgoing Ayrault Cabinet. Nine ministers kept the same ministry (with some change in portfolio for some), including Foreign Minister Laurent Fabius and Minister of Defence Jean-Yves Le Drian.

Two ministers had not been part of the Ayrault Cabinet: Ségolène Royal, who had previously been a minister in the Bérégovoy Cabinet and junior minister in the Jospin Cabinet, and François Rebsamen, who came from the position as leader of the Socialist Party group in the French Senate was included in a cabinet for the first time, becoming minister of labour.

Apart from the prime minister, the cabinet had full gender parity, with eight female and eight male ministers.

The average age of government ministers at the time of appointment was 54, with Laurent Fabius at 67 being the oldest and Najat Vallaud-Belkacem at 36 being the youngest.

On 9 April 2014, fourteen secretaries of states were appointed. They included Fleur Pellerin, who was deputy minister in Ayrault's cabinet, and First Secretary of the French Socialist Party Harlem Désir who both became secretaries to the foreign minister.

Born in Barcelona and becoming a French national in 1982, aged 19, Valls is the first French prime minister during the Fifth Republic who was not born a French citizen.

== Prime minister ==
Post	Name	Party
Prime Minister	Manuel Valls	PS

== Ministers ==
Post	Name	Party
Minister of Foreign Affairs and International Development	Laurent Fabius	PS
Minister of Ecology, Sustainable Development and Energy	Ségolène Royal	PS
Minister of National Education, Higher Education and Research	Benoît Hamon	PS
Minister of Justice; Keeper of the Seals	Christiane Taubira	PRG
Minister of Finance and Public Accounts	Michel Sapin	PS
Minister of Economy, Recovery of Productivity and Digital Affairs	Arnaud Montebourg	PS
Minister of Social Affairs	Marisol Touraine	PS
Minister of Labour, Employment and Social Dialogue	François Rebsamen	PS
Minister of Defence	Jean-Yves Le Drian	PS
Minister of the Interior	Bernard Cazeneuve	PS
Minister of Women's Rights, Urbanity, Youth Affairs and Sports	Najat Vallaud-Belkacem	PS
Minister of Decentralisation, State Reform and Public Service	Marylise Lebranchu	PS
Minister of Culture and Communication	Aurélie Filippetti	PS
Minister of Agriculture, Agrifood and Forestry, Government Spokesperson	Stéphane Le Foll	PS
Minister of Housing and Territorial Development	Sylvia Pinel	PRG
Minister of Overseas France	George Pau-Langevin	PS

=== Secretary of State ===
Post	Ministry	Name	Party
Secretary of State for Relations with Parliament	Prime Minister	Jean-Marie Le Guen	PS
Secretary of State for Foreign Trade and Tourism Promotion	Minister of Foreign Affairs and International Development	Fleur Pellerin	PS
Secretary of State for European Affairs	Minister of Foreign Affairs and International Development	Harlem Désir	PS
Secretary of State Development and Francophonie	Minister of Foreign Affairs and International Development	Annick Girardin	PRG
Secretary of State for Transport, Marine and Fisherie	Ecology, Sustainable Development and Energy	Frédéric Cuvillier	PS
Secretary of State for Higher Education and Research	Minister of National Education, Higher Education and Research	Geneviève Fioraso	PS
Secretary of State for the Budget	Minister of Finance and Public Accounts	Christian Eckert	PS
Secretary of State for Trade, Crafts, Consumer and Social Economy and Solidarity	Minister of Finance and Public Accounts	Valérie Fourneyron (until 3 June 2014); Carole Delga (since 3 June 2014)	PS
State Secretary for Digital Economy	Minister of Finance and Public Accounts	Axelle Lemaire	PS
Secretary of State for Veterans	Defence	Kader Arif	PS
Secretary of State for Territorial Reform	Minister of Decentralisation, State Reform and Public Service	André Vallini	PS
Secretary of State for Family, Elderly People and self	Social Affairs and Health	Laurence Rossignol	PS
State Secretary for the Disabled	Social Affairs and Health	Ségolène Neuville	PS
Secretary of State for Sports	Minister of Women's Rights, Urbanity, Youth Affairs and Sport	Thierry Braillard	PRG

== Changes ==
- On 3 June 2014, Valérie Fourneyron, Secretary of State for Trade, Crafts, Consumer and Social Economy and Solidarity, resigns for health reasons. She is replaced by Carole Delga.

Preceded by Second Ayrault government	Government of France; March–August 2014	Succeeded by Second Valls government
