= Opinion polling for the 2024 French legislative election =

This page lists public opinion polls conducted for the snap 2024 French legislative election, which was held in two rounds on 30 June and 7 July 2024. Unless otherwise noted, all polls listed below are compliant with the regulations of the national polling commission and utilize the quota method. Sample sizes listed are for registered voters, and polls are listed in reverse chronological then alphabetical order by name of institute.

== National polling ==
=== First round ===
The 20:00 CEST estimations made by various pollsters are not traditional exit polls, but are instead based on the level of turnout reported and first set of ballots counted at polling stations which close an hour or two earlier.

Polling firm	Fieldwork date	Sample size	Turnout	EXG	NFP				DVG	ECO	ENS	DVC	DSV	DVD	LR (CNI) (Note: Candidates presented by the national investiture commission of The Republicans (French: Commission nationale d'investiture des Républicains))	RN and allies		REC	REG	Others
Polling firm	Fieldwork date	Sample size	Turnout	EXG	LFI	PCF	LE	PS	DVG	ECO	ENS	DVC	DSV	DVD	LR (CNI)	LR (UXD) (Note: UXD, union of the far-right (French: union de l'extrême droite) is the electoral nuance assigned by the Ministry of the Interior to the 63 (initially 62) LR members invested as candidates supported by Éric Ciotti and the RN: "Publication des candidatures et des résultats aux élections". Ministère de l'Intérieur.; Guez, Ariel (17 June 2024). "Législatives: au moins 62 candidats soutenus par Éric Ciotti et le RN, près de 400 par Les Républicains". BFMTV.; None of these 63 candidates are outgoing deputies in the National Assembly except for Ciotti and Christelle d'Intorni. All other outgoing LR deputies were reinvested separately due to the expulsion vote against Ciotti: Barbarit, Simon (17 June 2024). "Alliance Ciotti Bardella : que sait-on des candidats investis pour les législatives ?". Public Sénat.; "Législatives : LR investit tous ses députés sortants, sauf Éric Ciotti et une de ses proches". Le Parisien. Agence France-Presse. 12 June 2024.)	RN	REC	REG	Others
Ministry of the Interior	30 Jun 2024	—	66.71%	1.14%	28.21%				1.57%	0.57%	21.28%	1.22%	0.28%	3.60%	6.57%	3.96%	29.26%	0.75%	0.97%	0.63%
Elabe	30 Jun 2024	20:00; CEST est.	67.5%	1.5%	28.5%				1.5%	–	22.0%		0.5% (Note: Including miscellaneous far-right candidates)	10.5%		33.0%		0.5%	–	2.0%
Harris Interactive	30 Jun 2024	20:00; CEST est.	67.0%	–	29.6%					–	22.4%		– (Note: Grouped with Reconquête)	10.0%		34.2%		1.0% (Note: Includes sovereignist right)	–	2.8%
Ifop	30 Jun 2024	20:00; CEST est.	67.0%	1.3%	29.1%				–	–	21.5%	–	–	10.0%		34.2%		0.6%	–	3.3%
Ipsos	30 Jun 2024	20:00; CEST est.	65.5%	1.2%	28.1%				1.8%	–	20.3%	1.4%	0.3%	10.2%		4.0%	30.0%	0.6%	–	2.1%
OpinionWay	30 Jun 2024	20:00; CEST est.	67.5%	1.5%	29.0%				–	–	22.0%	–	–	9.0%		34.0%		1.0%	–	3.5%
Harris Interactive	27–28 Jun 2024	2,182	–	0.5%	28%				1%	–	20%	1%	0.5%	2%	6%	3%	34%	2%	–	2%
Ipsos	27–28 Jun 2024	10,286	64%	1%	29%				1%	–	20%	1.5%	0.5%	8%		4%	32%	1%	–	2%
Ifop	25–28 Jun 2024	2,824	67%	1%	29%				1%	–	20.5%	0.5%	–	7%		36.5%		1.5%	–	3%
Elabe	26–27 Jun 2024	1,871	64%	1%	27.5%				2%	–	20%	0.5%	0.5%	9%		36%		1.5%	–	2%
Odoxa	26–27 Jun 2024	1,896	66%	1%	27.5%				1.5%	1%	21%	–	–	2%	7%	35%		1.5%	–	2.5%
OpinionWay	26–27 Jun 2024	1,058	65%	1%	28%				1%	<1%	20%	–	–	2%	6%	37%		1%	–	4%
Cluster17	25–27 Jun 2024	2,465	65%	1.5%	29.5%				1%	–	20%	1%	–	1.5%	7.5%	4%	31%	1.5%	–	1.5%
Ifop	24–27 Jun 2024	2,823	66%	0.5%	29%				1%	–	21%	1%	–	6.5%		36%		1.5%	–	3.5%
Harris Interactive	25–26 Jun 2024	2,014	–	0.5%	27%				1%	–	21%	0.5%	0.5%	2%	6%	3%	34%	2%	–	2.5%
OpinionWay	25–26 Jun 2024	1,035	–	1%	28%				1%	1%	20%	–	–	2%	7%	36%		2%	–	2%
Ifop	22–26 Jun 2024	2,343	66%	1%	28.5%				1%	–	21%	1%	–	6%		36%		1%	–	4.5%
Ifop	21–25 Jun 2024	2,335	64.5%	1%	28.5%				0.5%	–	21%	1%	–	6.5%		36%		1.5%	–	4%
Cluster17	22–24 Jun 2024	2,470	64.5%	1.5%	30%				1.5%	–	19.5%	1%	–	1.5%	7.5%	4%	30.5%	1.5%	–	1.5%
Harris Interactive	21–24 Jun 2024	2,004	–	1%	27%				1%	–	20%	1%	0.5%	2%	7%	4%	33%	2%	–	1.5%
Ipsos	21–24 Jun 2024	11,820	63%	1%	29%				1%	–	19.5%	1.5%	0.5%	8%		4%	32%	1.5%	–	2%
OpinionWay	21–24 Jun 2024	3,040	58%	1%	28%				1%	<1%	19%	–	–	4%	7%	36%		1%	–	3%
Ifop	20–24 Jun 2024	1,843	63.5%	1%	29.5%				1%	–	20.5%	1%	–	7%		36%		1%	–	3%
Ifop	19–22 Jun 2024	1,853	64%	1.5%	29%				1%	–	21%	1%	–	7%		35.5%		1%	–	3%
Elabe	19–21 Jun 2024	1,870	63%	1%	27%				2%	–	20%	0.5%	0.5%	10%		36%		1.5%	–	1.5%
Ifop	18–21 Jun 2024	2,317	64%	1%	29%				1%	–	21.5%	1%	–	6.5%		35%		1.5%	–	3.5%
Harris Interactive	19–20 Jun 2024	2,004	–	1%	26%				1%	–	21%	1%	0.5%	2%	6%	2%	33%	3%	–	3.5%
Ipsos	19–20 Jun 2024	2,000	62%	1.5%	29.5%				1%	–	19.5%	1%	1.5%		7%	4%	31.5%	2%	–	1.5%
Odoxa	19–20 Jun 2024	1,861	64%	2%	28%				3%	1.5%	19%	–	–	1%	7%	33%		3.5%	–	2%
OpinionWay	19–20 Jun 2024	1,009	–	1%	28%				1%	<1%	22%	–	–	3%	6%	35%		1%	–	3%
Ifop	18–20 Jun 2024	1,861	64%	1%	29%				1%	–	22%	1%	–	6%		34%		2%	–	4%
OpinionWay	18–20 Jun 2024	1,057	–	<1%	27%				2%	1%	20%	–	–	2%	7%	35%		2%	–	4%
Cluster17	17–19 Jun 2024	2,654	60.5%	1%	30%				3%	–	19%	–	–	2.5%	7%	32%		2.5%	–	3%
Ifop	14–17 Jun 2024	1,131	62%	1.5%	28%				3%	–	18%	–	0.5%	2%	5%	4%	33%	3%	–	2%
Ifop	13–14 Jun 2024	1,114	63%	1%	26%				3.5%	–	19%	–	1%	1.5%	7%		35%	3%	–	3%
OpinionWay	12–13 Jun 2024	1,011	–	1%	25%				2%	2%	20%	–	–	2%	7%		33%	3%	–	5%
Cluster17	11–13 Jun 2024	2,764	60%	1%	28.5%				3%	1.5%	18%	1%	1.5%	2.5%	7%		29.5%	3.5%	1%	2%
Elabe	11–12 Jun 2024	1,422	57%	1%	28%				5%	–	18%	–	–	2%	6.5%		31%	4%	–	4.5%
OpinionWay	11–12 Jun 2024	1,019	–	1%	25%				3%	1%	19%	–	–	1%	9%		32%	4%	–	5%
Ifop	10–11 Jun 2024	1,089	–	1%	25%				5%	–	18%	–	0.5%	1.5%	9%		35%	4%	–	1%
Ifop	10–11 Jun 2024	1,089	–	1%	11%	19%			3%	–	17%	–	<0.5%	2%	8%		34%	4%	–	1%
Ifop	10–11 Jun 2024	1,089	–	1%	11%	2%	6%	13%	2%	–	16%	–	0.5%	1%	8%		35%	3.5%	–	1%
OpinionWay	10 Jun 2024	1,095	–	1%	23%				4%	2%	18%	–	–	2%	8%		33%	5%	–	4%
Harris Interactive	9–10 Jun 2024	2,340	–	3%	22%				9%	–	19%	–	–	9%			34%	4%	–	–
Ifop	12–13 Dec 2023	1,100	–	1.5%	24%				6%	–	19%	–	1%	3%	11%		28%	5%	–	1.5%
Ifop	12–13 Dec 2023	1,100	–	1%	10%	4%	9%	8%	2%	–	18%	–	1%	3%	10%		27%	6%	–	1%
Elabe	3–5 Apr 2023	1,699	–	1%	25.5%				3%	–	21.5%	–	1.5%	1%	11.5%		24.5%	4.5%	–	6%
Ifop	20–21 Mar 2023	1,094	–	1%	26%				5%	–	22%	–	1%	2%	10%		26%	5%	–	2%
Ifop	20–21 Mar 2023	1,094	–	1%	11%	3%	9%	7%	3%	–	21%	–	1%	1%	10%		26%	5%	–	2%
Harris Interactive	3–7 Mar 2023	2,108	–	1%	24%				6%	–	24%	1%	1%	3%	10%		22%	4%	–	4%
Cluster17	4–6 Nov 2022	2,096	56.9%	1.5%	24.5%				3%	1% (Note: Animalist Party, which is not officially presenting candidates in the 2024 legislative elections: Avot, Céline (17 June 2024). "Législatives 2024. Pas de candidat pour le Parti animaliste dans la 2e circonscription de la Manche". Ouest-France.)	25%	0.5%	2%	2%	10.5%		20%	5%	1%	4%
Ifop	2–4 Nov 2022	1,396	–	1.5%	25%				4%	–	27%	–	0.5%	2%	11%		21%	5.5%	–	2.5%
Ifop	2–4 Nov 2022	1,396	–	1.5%	11%	3%	7%	8%	2%	–	26%	–	0%	3%	11%		21%	5%	–	1.5%
Ministry of the Interior (Le Monde)	12 Jun 2022	—	47.51%	1.17% (1.19%)	25.66% (26.16%)				3.70% (3.30%)	2.67% (–)	25.75% (25.80%)	1.25% (1.30%)	1.13% (1.21%)	2.33% (1.92%)	11.29% (11.30%)		18.68% (18.68%)	4.24% (4.25%)	1.28% (1.09%)	0.85% (3.80%)

== Seat projections ==
Even though polls since the publication of the official list of candidates by the Ministry of the Interior ask about the specific candidates within each constituency, seat projections should be treated with a significant level of precaution due to their numerous sources of uncertainty which include but are not limited to:

- the large historical error associated with these seat projections outside of the margins of uncertainty reported by pollsters;
- the fact that the legislative election is based on two rounds of voting with 577 varying configurations of candidates in different constituencies, rather than a national party list vote;
- the number of constituencies with second rounds featuring more than two candidates (due to the threshold of 12.5% of registered voters to appear in the second round);
- the need to make inferences about first-to-second round vote transfers between candidates based on historical voting patterns;
- the fact that only residents of metropolitan France are usually surveyed, excluding constituencies of overseas France and constituencies for French residents overseas;
- the unpredictability of eliminated candidates' voting instructions in the aftermath of the first round and candidate withdrawals in constituencies with three or more candidates advancing to the second round; and
- the fact that these projections are agnostic to local factors such as the strength of specific incumbent deputies because they are not made on a constituency-by-constituency basis (and no national polls have a large enough sample size to detect such anomalies), and are instead based on simulations using the aforementioned inferences on the basis of national-level polling with a representative sample in terms of gender, age, region, urbanicity, and socio-economic status (among other variables) projected onto each constituency.

Due to these uncertainties, certain polling institutes opt not to release seat projections alongside topline voting intention figures prior to the first round, and only publish such projections after the results of that initial voting is known.

These seat projections are not subject to the same regulations of the national polling committee as regular voting intention polls are.

The precautions above also apply to the estimations released by pollsters at 20:00 CEST on the day of the first round, though may be slightly more reliable due to asking about several second-round hypotheses based on large number of survey interviews conducted in the hours just prior to the day of the vote. As with the vote percentage estimations after the first round, seat projections produced after the second round made by various pollsters are not traditional exit polls, but are instead based on the level of turnout reported and first set of ballots counted at polling stations which close an hour or two earlier. At least 289 seats are needed for an absolute majority.

Polling firm	Fieldwork date	Sample size	Turnout	NFP				DVG	ENS			DVC	DVD	LR (CNI)	RN and allies		DSV	Others
Polling firm	Fieldwork date	Sample size	Turnout	LFI	PCF	LE	PS	DVG	RE	MoDem	HOR	DVC	DVD	LR (CNI)	LR (UXD)	RN	DSV	Others
Ministry of the Interior	7 Jul 2024	—	66.63%	180				12	159			6	27	39	17	125	0	12
Elabe	7 Jul 2024	20:00; CEST est.	67.1%	175–205				11–13	150–175				60–70		115–150		0–1	10–14
Harris Interactive	7 Jul 2024	20:00; CEST est.	67.1%	83–90	8–10	37–41	58–70	13	150–182				60–75		8–18	102–140	–	10–15
Ifop	7 Jul 2024	20:00; CEST est.	67.5%	180–215				10	150–180			–	60–65		120–150		–	5–6
Ipsos	7 Jul 2024	20:00; CEST est.	67.0%	68–74	10–12	32–36	63–69	13–16	95–105	31–37	24–28	6–8 (Note: Including UDI)	57–67		12–16	120–136	–	22–30
OpinionWay	7 Jul 2024	20:00; CEST est.	67.0%	180–210					155–175				46–56		135–155		–	15–25
Cluster17	5 Jul 2024	1,401	–	165–195				–	130–160			–	–	30–50	170–210		–	15–30
Harris Interactive	4–5 Jul 2024	2,951	–	168–198				–	115–145			–	–	32–63	185–215		–	15–30
Ifop	3–5 Jul 2024	2,859	69%	155–185				10–18	120–150			–	50–65		170–210		–	5–15
Elabe	3–4 Jul 2024	2,005	65%	165–190					120–140			–	35–50		200–230		–	10–12
Ifop	3–4 Jul 2024	1,916	68%	170–200				–	95–125			–	25–45		210–240		–	15–27
Ipsos	3–4 Jul 2024	10,101	68%	58–68	7–9	29–37	51–61	14–16	78–94	23–31	17–23	6–8	57–67		18–24	157–181	–	8–12
Odoxa	3–4 Jul 2024	952	–	140–180					115–155			–	40–60		210–250		–	10–20
OpinionWay	3–4 Jul 2024	3,355	–	145–175				–	130–162			–	38–50		205–230		–	8–12
OpinionWay	3–4 Jul 2024	–	–	150–180				–	125–155			–	38–50		205–230		–	8–12
Harris Interactive	2–3 Jul 2024	3,008	–	159–183				–	110–135			–	–	30–50	190–220		–	17–31
Elabe	30 Jun 2024	Most recent est.	–	120–140				11–12	90–125				35–45		255–295		0–1	10–14
Harris Interactive	30 Jun 2024	Most recent est.	–	140–190					70–120				30–50		30–45	210–260	0–2 (Note: Includes Reconquête)	10–20
Ifop	30 Jun 2024	Most recent est.	–	180–200				–	60–90			–	30–50		240–270		–	13–21
Ipsos	30 Jun 2024	Most recent est.	–	58–72	6–12	28–38	33–43	11–19	53–71	13–19	4–10	–	41–61		26–36	204–244	–	22–30
OpinionWay	30 Jun 2024	Most recent est.	–	130–170					65–105				30–50		250–300		–	24–30
Harris Interactive	27–28 Jun 2024	2,182	–	120–150				–	80–130			–	–	30–50	20–35	220–260	0–2	10–20
Ifop	25–28 Jun 2024	2,824	–	170–200				10–18	70–100			–	30–60		225–265 (Note: Including 20–25 seats for the union of the far-right of pro-Éric Ciotti candidates of The Republicans supported by the National Rally)		–	1–5
Elabe	26–27 Jun 2024	1,871	–	155–175					85–105			–	30–40		260–295		–	8–10
Odoxa	26–27 Jun 2024	1,896	–	150–190					70–110			–	15–45		265–305		–	–
Cluster17	25–27 Jun 2024	2,465	–	180–220				–	65–110			–	–	25–35	210–255		–	20–30
Ifop	24–27 Jun 2024	2,823	–	180–210				5–9	75–110			–	25–50		220–260 (Note: Including 10–20 seats for the union of the far-right of pro-Éric Ciotti candidates of The Republicans supported by the National Rally)		–	6–10
Harris Interactive	25–26 Jun 2024	2,014	–	125–155				–	75–125			–	–	30–50	20–35	230–270	0–2	10–20
Ifop	22–26 Jun 2024	2,343	–	180–210				5–9	75–110			–	23–50		220–260		–	5–9
Ifop	21–25 Jun 2024	2,335	–	180–210				5–9	75–110			–	25–50		220–260		–	4–8
Cluster17	22–24 Jun 2024	2,470	–	180–230				–	65–100			–	–	25–40	210–250		–	20–30
Harris Interactive	21–24 Jun 2024	2,044	–	150–180				–	85–130			–	–	30–50	15–30	215–245	0–2	10–20
Ifop	20–24 Jun 2024	1,843	–	185–215				6–10	70–100			–	30–50		220–260		–	3–7
Ifop	19–22 Jun 2024	1,853	–	180–210				7–11	75–105			–	40–60		210–250		–	3–8
Elabe	19–21 Jun 2024	1,870	–	150–170					90–110			–	35–45		250–280		–	10–12
Ifop	18–21 Jun 2024	2,317	–	180–210				8–12	80–110			–	40–60		200–240		–	5–10
Harris Interactive	19–20 Jun 2024	2,004	–	135–165				–	95–130			–	–	30–50	15–30	220–250	0–2	10–20
Odoxa	19–20 Jun 2024	1,861	–	160–210					70–120			–	10–50		250–300		–	–
Cluster17	17–19 Jun 2024	2,654	–	190–240				–	70–100			–	–	20–30	200–250		–	20–30
Cluster17	11–13 Jun 2024	2,764	–	190–235				10–14	70–100			–	–	23–35		195–245	–	10–16
Elabe	11–12 Jun 2024	1,422	–	150–190					90–130			–	30–40			220–270	–	10–20
Harris-Interactive	9–10 Jun 2024	2,340	–	115–145				–	125–155			–	40–55			235–265	0–2	5–20
Ipsos (for LR)	8–13 Dec 2023	4,000	–	55–79				20–22	117–165			3	7–8	44–60		243–305	–	10–11
Elabe	3–5 Apr 2023	1,699	–	150–180				15–20	130–155				60–75			150–175	1–2	12–15
Harris-Interactive	3–7 Mar 2023	2,108	–	158–168					234–244				69–79			91–100		8–14
Ministry of the Interior (Le Monde)	19 Jun 2022	—	46.23%	131 (142)				22 (13)	245 (246)			4 (5)	74 (73)			89 (89)	1 (1)	11 (8)

== By second round configuration ==
Polling firm	Fieldwork date	Sample size	Turnout	NFP (any party)				NFP (depends on party)	ENS	LR (CNI)	RN	Abs./blank/ null vote/ don't know
Polling firm	Fieldwork date	Sample size	Turnout	LFI	PCF	LE	PS	NFP (depends on party)	ENS	LR (CNI)	RN	Abs./blank/ null vote/ don't know
CSA	4 Jul 2024	1,009	–	32%	–	–	–	–	–	–	41%	27%
OpinionWay	3–4 Jul 2024	693	64%	36%					34%	–	30%	–
OpinionWay	3–4 Jul 2024	860	62%	47%					–	–	53%	–
OpinionWay	3–4 Jul 2024	813	63%	–	–	–	–	–	52%	–	48%	–
Ifop	1–2 Jul 2024	1,118	–	42%	–	–	–	–	58%	–	–	–
Ifop	1–2 Jul 2024	1,118	–	50%	–	–	–	–	–	–	50%	–
Ifop	1–2 Jul 2024	1,118	–	–	–	48%		–	52%	–	–	–
Ifop	1–2 Jul 2024	1,118	–	–	–	53%		–	–	–	47%	–
Ifop	1–2 Jul 2024	1,118	–	–	–	–	–	–	53%	–	47%	–
Ifop	1–2 Jul 2024	1,118	–	–	–	–	–	–	–	56%	44%	–
Ipsos	27–28 Jun 2024	10,286	–	32%	–	–	–	–	–	–	41%	27%
Ipsos	27–28 Jun 2024	10,286	–	–	–	38%	–	–	–	–	41%	21%
Ipsos	27–28 Jun 2024	10,286	–	–	–	–	40%	–	–	–	39%	21%
OpinionWay	21–24 Jun 2024	3,040	–	26%					29%	–	–	45%
OpinionWay	21–24 Jun 2024	3,040	–	33%					–	–	40%	27%
OpinionWay	21–24 Jun 2024	3,040	–	–	–	–	–	–	29%	–	34%	37%
Odoxa	26–27 Jun 2024	1,005	–	25%				9%	–	–	38%	28%
Odoxa	26–27 Jun 2024	1,005	–	17%				10%	21%	–	34%	18%
OpinionWay	17–18 Jun 2024	1,044	–	33%					–	–	41%	26%
OpinionWay	17–18 Jun 2024	1,044	–	–	–	–	–	–	40%	–	37%	23%

=== By first round vote ===
==== NFP–ENS–RN ====
Polling firm	Fieldwork date	Sample size	First round vote	NFP/DVG	ENS	RN/UXD	None of these
Elabe	3–4 Jul 2024	2,005	NFP/DVG	87%	3%	1%	9%
Elabe	3–4 Jul 2024	2,005	ENS	2%	83%	0%	15%
Elabe	3–4 Jul 2024	2,005	RN/UXD	1%	1%	87%	11%
OpinionWay	3–4 Jul 2024	693	NFP/DVG	96%	1%	2%	1%
OpinionWay	3–4 Jul 2024	693	ENS	9%	86%	0%	5%
OpinionWay	3–4 Jul 2024	693	LR/DVD	5%	18%	60%	17%
OpinionWay	3–4 Jul 2024	693	RN/UXD	1%	1%	98%	0%

==== NFP–RN ====
Polling firm	Fieldwork date	Sample size	First round vote	NFP/DVG	RN/UXD	None of these
Elabe	3–4 Jul 2024	2,005	NFP/DVG	86%	3%	11%
Elabe	3–4 Jul 2024	2,005	ENS	32%	18%	50%
Elabe	3–4 Jul 2024	2,005	RN/UXD	1%	92%	7%
OpinionWay	3–4 Jul 2024	860	NFP/DVG	98%	0%	2%
OpinionWay	3–4 Jul 2024	860	ENS	48%	16%	36%
OpinionWay	3–4 Jul 2024	860	LR/DVD	18%	51%	31%
OpinionWay	3–4 Jul 2024	860	RN/UXD	0%	99%	1%

===== LFI–ENS =====
Polling firm	Fieldwork date	Sample size	First round vote	LFI	ENS	None of these
Ifop	1–2 Jul 2024	1,118	NFP/DVG	88%	12%	–
Ifop	1–2 Jul 2024	1,118	ENS	10%	90%	–
Ifop	1–2 Jul 2024	1,118	LR/DVD	23%	77%	–
Ifop	1–2 Jul 2024	1,118	RN/UXD	25%	75%	–

===== LFI–RN =====
Polling firm	Fieldwork date	Sample size	First round vote	LFI	RN/UXD	None of these
CSA	4 Jul 2024	1,009	NFP/DVG	87%	5%	8%
CSA	4 Jul 2024	1,009	ENS	37%	13%	50%
CSA	4 Jul 2024	1,009	LR/DVD	15%	38%	47%
CSA	4 Jul 2024	1,009	RN/UXD	0%	98%	2%
Ifop	1–2 Jul 2024	1,118	NFP/DVG	98%	2%	–
Ifop	1–2 Jul 2024	1,118	ENS	66%	34%	–
Ifop	1–2 Jul 2024	1,118	LR/DVD	41%	59%	–
Ifop	1–2 Jul 2024	1,118	RN/UXD	2%	98%	–

===== PS/LE–ENS =====
Polling firm	Fieldwork date	Sample size	First round vote	PS/LE	ENS	None of these
Ifop	1–2 Jul 2024	1,118	NFP/DVG	94%	6%	–
Ifop	1–2 Jul 2024	1,118	ENS	14%	86%	–
Ifop	1–2 Jul 2024	1,118	LR/DVD	31%	69%	–
Ifop	1–2 Jul 2024	1,118	RN/UXD	29%	71%	–

===== PS/LE–RN =====
Polling firm	Fieldwork date	Sample size	First round vote	PS/LE	RN/UXD	None of these
Ifop	1–2 Jul 2024	1,118	NFP/DVG	95%	5%	–
Ifop	1–2 Jul 2024	1,118	ENS	77%	23%	–
Ifop	1–2 Jul 2024	1,118	LR/DVD	52%	48%	–
Ifop	1–2 Jul 2024	1,118	RN/UXD	2%	98%	–

==== ENS–RN ====
Polling firm	Fieldwork date	Sample size	First round vote	ENS	RN/UXD	None of these
Elabe	3–4 Jul 2024	2,005	NFP/DVG	62%	6%	32%
Elabe	3–4 Jul 2024	2,005	ENS	81%	8%	11%
Elabe	3–4 Jul 2024	2,005	RN/UXD	2%	88%	10%
OpinionWay	3–4 Jul 2024	813	NFP/DVG	56%	17%	27%
OpinionWay	3–4 Jul 2024	813	ENS	93%	5%	2%
OpinionWay	3–4 Jul 2024	813	LR/DVD	56%	40%	4%
OpinionWay	3–4 Jul 2024	813	RN/UXD	2%	97%	1%
Ifop	1–2 Jul 2024	1,118	NFP/DVG	84%	16%	–
Ifop	1–2 Jul 2024	1,118	ENS	92%	8%	–
Ifop	1–2 Jul 2024	1,118	LR/DVD	57%	43%	–
Ifop	1–2 Jul 2024	1,118	RN/UXD	3%	97%	–

==== LR–RN ====
Polling firm	Fieldwork date	Sample size	First round vote	LR/DVD	RN/UXD	None of these
Elabe	3–4 Jul 2024	2,005	NFP/DVG	57%	5%	38%
Elabe	3–4 Jul 2024	2,005	LR/DVD	90%	2%	8%
Elabe	3–4 Jul 2024	2,005	RN/UXD	1%	87%	12%
Ifop	1–2 Jul 2024	1,118	NFP/DVG	87%	13%	–
Ifop	1–2 Jul 2024	1,118	ENS	90%	10%	–
Ifop	1–2 Jul 2024	1,118	LR/DVD	81%	19%	–
Ifop	1–2 Jul 2024	1,118	RN/UXD	5%	95%	–

== By constituency ==
Because the configuration of the second round, if any, is contingent on the level of turnout in the first round, only the top-placed candidate is highlighted in first-round polls below.

=== Alpes-Maritimes's 1st ===
==== First round ====
Polling firm	Fieldwork date	Sample size	Alain Langouet LO	Olivier Salerno NFP–LFI	Graig Monetti ENS–HOR	Lalla Chama Ben Moulay ÉAC	Virgile Vanier-Guérin LR (CNI)	Éric Ciotti LR (UXD)	Jean-Claude Wahid Spach DG	Maxime Bovis SE
Ministry of the Interior	30 Jun 2024	—	0.62%	26.62%	22.79%	2.81%	5.78%	41.04%	0.27%	0.07%
Ifop	25–27 Jun 2024	543	0.5%	26%	22%	3%	5.5%	42%	0.5%	0.5%

==== Second round ====
Polling firm	Fieldwork date	Sample size	Olivier Salerno NFP–LFI	Graig Monetti ENS–HOR	Éric Ciotti LR (UXD)
Ministry of the Interior	7 Jul 2024	—	32.13%	22.73%	45.14%
Ifop	25–27 Jun 2024	543	27%	27%	46%
Ifop	25–27 Jun 2024	543	40%	–	60%

=== Calvados's 6th ===
==== Second round ====
Polling firm	Fieldwork date	Sample size	Élisabeth Borne ENS–RE	Nicolas Calbrix RN
Ministry of the Interior	7 Jul 2024	—	56.36%	43.64%
Ifop	2–3 Jul 2024	611	54%	46%

=== Lot-et-Garonne's 3rd ===
==== First round ====
Polling firm	Fieldwork date	Sample size	Bernadette Gasc LO	Xavier Czapla NFP–LFI	Jérôme Cahuzac DVG	Guillaume Lepers LR (CNI)	Annick Cousin RN
Ministry of the Interior	30 Jun 2024	—	1.01%	18.36%	14.56%	24.99%	41.08%
Ifop	24–26 Jun 2024	561	1%	19%	23%	19%	38%

==== Second round ====
Polling firm	Fieldwork date	Sample size	Xavier Czapla NFP–LFI	Jérôme Cahuzac DVG	Guillaume Lepers LR (CNI)	Annick Cousin RN
Ministry of the Interior	7 Jul 2024	—	–	–	54.13%	45.87%
Ifop	24–26 Jun 2024	561	22%	31%	–	47%
Ifop	24–26 Jun 2024	561	–	49%	–	51%

=== Nord's 10th ===
==== First round ====
Polling firm	Fieldwork date	Sample size	Christophe Charlon LO	Leslie Mortreux NFP–REV	Gérald Darmanin ENS–RE	Jérôme Garcia LR	Bastien Verbrugghe RN	Gustave Viguie-Desplaces REC	Marcelin Brazon Résistons!
Ministry of the Interior	30 Jun 2024	—	1.10%	24.83%	36.03%	2.98%	34.31%	0.51%	0.25%
Ifop	18–20 Jun 2024	602	1.5%	24%	42%	2.5%	28%	1%	1%

==== Second round ====
Polling firm	Fieldwork date	Sample size	Leslie Mortreux NFP–REV	Gérald Darmanin ENS–RE	Bastien Verbrugghe RN
Ministry of the Interior	7 Jul 2024	—	–	61.37%	38.63%
Ifop	18–20 Jun 2024	602	–	65%	35%
Ifop	18–20 Jun 2024	602	27%	44%	29%

=== Seine-Saint-Denis's 7th ===
==== First round ====
Polling firm	Fieldwork date	Sample size	Aurélie Jochaud LO	Elsa Caudron NPA	Yannick Duterte PRCF	Sabrina Ali Benali NFP–LFI	Alexis Corbière LFI diss.	Éric Verhaeghe AC	Pauline Breteau ENS–HOR	Antoine Toche DVD	Françoise Trova RN	Sébastien Atlani SE
Ministry of the Interior	30 Jun 2024	—	0.63%	0.30%	0.33%	36.38%	40.19%	0.95%	10.06%	1.31%	9.69%	0.14%
Ifop	25–26 Jun 2024	550	1%	0%	1%	35%	40%	1.5%	10%	1.5%	10%	0%

==== Second round ====
Polling firm	Fieldwork date	Sample size	Sabrina Ali Benali NFP–LFI	Alexis Corbière LFI diss.
Ministry of the Interior	7 Jul 2024	—	42.84%	57.16%
Ifop	25–26 Jun 2024	550	46%	54%

== See also ==
- Opinion polling for the 2022 French legislative election
- Opinion polling for the 2024 EP election in France
- Opinion polling on the Emmanuel Macron presidency
- Opinion polling for the 2027 French presidential election
