= Results of the 2024 French legislative election in Lot-et-Garonne =

Following the first round of the 2024 French legislative election on 30 June 2024, runoff elections in each constituency where no candidate received a vote share greater than 50 percent were scheduled for 7 July. Candidates permitted to stand in the runoff elections needed to either come in first or second place in the first round or achieve more than 12.5 percent of the votes of the entire electorate (as opposed to 12.5 percent of the vote share due to low turnout).

== Lot-et-Garonne ==
=== 1st constituency ===
| Candidate | Party or alliance | | First round | | Second round | |
| Candidate | Party or alliance | | Votes | % | Votes | % |
|---|---|---|---|---|---|---|
| Sébastien Delbosq | National Rally | | 26,034 | 43.11 | 28,208 | 47.68 |
| Michel Lauzzana | Ensemble | Renaissance | 17,155 | 28.41 | 30,952 | 52.32 |
| Paul Vo Van | New Popular Front | The Ecologists | 15,479 | 25.63 | | |
| Patrice Cuquel | Regionalists | | 1,021 | 1.69 | | |
| Mohamed El Marbati | Far-left | Lutte Ouvrière | 700 | 1.16 | | |
| Total | | | 60,389 | 100.00 | 59,160 | 100.00 |
| Valid votes | | | 60,389 | 96.33 | 59,160 | 93.89 |
| Invalid votes | | | 842 | 1.34 | 1,171 | 1.86 |
| Blank votes | | | 1,456 | 2.32 | 2,677 | 4.25 |
| Total votes | | | 62,687 | 100.00 | 63,008 | 100.00 |
| Registered voters/turnout | | | 88,558 | 70.79 | 88,552 | 71.15 |

=== 2nd constituency ===
| Candidate | Party or alliance | | First round | | Second round | |
| Candidate | Party or alliance | | Votes | % | Votes | % |
|---|---|---|---|---|---|---|
| Hélène Laporte | National Rally | | 25,283 | 49.31 | 28,203 | 57.20 |
| Christophe Courregelongue | New Popular Front | Socialist Party | 13,787 | 26.89 | 21,103 | 42.80 |
| Jean-Marie Lenzi | Ensemble | Renaissance | 11,272 | 21.99 | | |
| Nathalie Lambolez | Far-left | Lutte Ouvrière | 929 | 1.81 | | |
| Total | | | 51,271 | 100.00 | 49,306 | 100.00 |
| Valid votes | | | 51,271 | 96.12 | 49,306 | 91.69 |
| Invalid votes | | | 877 | 1.64 | 1,409 | 2.62 |
| Blank votes | | | 1,195 | 2.24 | 3,060 | 5.69 |
| Total votes | | | 53,343 | 100.00 | 53,775 | 100.00 |
| Registered voters/turnout | | | 76,944 | 69.33 | 76,963 | 69.87 |

=== 3rd constituency ===
| Candidate | Party or alliance | | First round | | Second round | |
| Candidate | Party or alliance | | Votes | % | Votes | % |
|---|---|---|---|---|---|---|
| Annick Cousin | National Rally | | 21,170 | 41.08 | 23,464 | 45.87 |
| Guillaume Lepers | Miscellaneous right | The Republicans | 12,876 | 24.99 | 27,689 | 54.13 |
| Xavier Czapla | New Popular Front | La France Insoumise | 9,504 | 18.44 | | |
| Jerôme Cahuzac | Miscellaneous left | Independent | 7,457 | 14.47 | | |
| Bernadette Gasc | Far-left | Lutte Ouvrière | 521 | 1.01 | | |
| Total | | | 51,528 | 100.00 | 51,153 | 100.00 |
| Valid votes | | | 51,528 | 97.22 | 51,153 | 95.65 |
| Invalid votes | | | 576 | 1.09 | 804 | 1.50 |
| Blank votes | | | 900 | 1.70 | 1,523 | 2.85 |
| Total votes | | | 53,004 | 100.00 | 53,480 | 100.00 |
| Registered voters/turnout | | | 75,768 | 69.96 | 75,784 | 70.57 |
