= Jean-Jacques Urvoas =

French politician

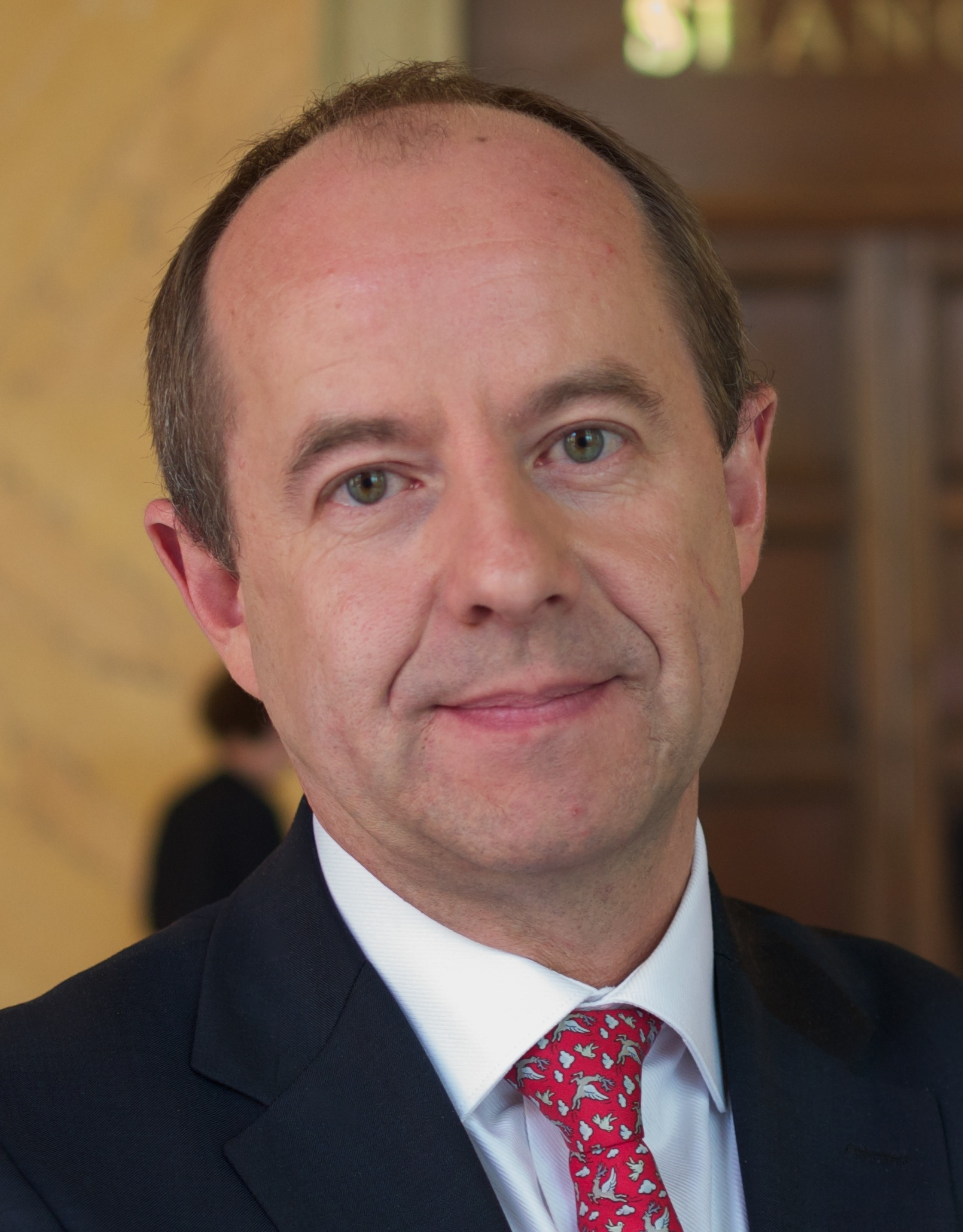
- Jean-Jacques Urvoas in 2013

Minister of Justice
- In office 27 January 2016 – 10 May 2017
- President: François Hollande
- Prime Minister: Manuel Valls; Bernard Cazeneuve
- Preceded by: Christiane Taubira
- Succeeded by: François Bayrou

Member of the National Assembly for Finistère's 1st constituency
- In office 20 June 2007 – 20 June 2017
- Preceded by: Marcelle Ramonet
- Succeeded by: Marie-Thérèse Le Roy

Personal details
- Born: 19 September 1959 (age 67) Brest, France
- Party: Socialist Party
- Education: University of Western Brittany; University of Rennes 1 Panthéon-Sorbonne University

Jean-Jacques Urvoas (born 19 September 1959) is a French politician. He was minister of Justice from 2016 to 2017. He represented Finistère's 1st constituency in the National Assembly of France from 2007 to 2016, as a member of the Socialist, radical, citizen and miscellaneous left.

== Early life and education ==
Jean-Jacques Urvoas was born on 19 September 1959 in Brest. His father was a pharmacist general in the army. He describes himself as having been "a real dunce" at school. He studied, in turn, law at the University of Western Brittany in Brest, political science at the University of Rennes I, and political communication at Paris I. He then proceeded to the Sorbonne where he wrote a dissertation on politicians Michel Rocard and Simone Veil. In 1996, he returned to Brest, where he earned a doctorate in political science with a thesis entitled "Electoral Table of Western Brittany, 1973-1993" and written under the direction of Jacques Baguenard.

== Career ==
In 1998, he became a lecturer in public law at the University of Western Brittany and the Brest Institute for General Administration (IPAG Brest). He taught constitutional law and political science in the law training and research unit (UFR). Since his election to the French National Assembly, he has been seconded from the public service.

He joined the French Socialist Party (PS) for the first time in 1977 but left it because he was disappointed by the lack of an "epic breath." He returned to it intermittently, however, until 1981. From 1984 to 1986, while he was a student, he worked as a parliamentary assistant in the National Assembly. In 1986, he became director of the Mutualité Finistere and in 1989, Bernard Poignant, who had been elected mayor of Quimper, asked him to become the director of his cabinet.

=== Socialist Party ===
==== Local elections ====
He has been a member of the Socialist Party since the age of 18. He served as First Secretary of the Federation of the PS in Finistère from 2000 to 2008. In 2001, he was a candidate on the PS-Greens list led by Jean-Claude Joseph in the municipal elections in Quimper. He was elected regional councilor of Brittany in 2004 and became president of the socialist group.

==== Deputy ====
He was elected deputy on 17 June 2007, serving in the XIIIth legislature (2007–2012) and representing the 1st district of Finistère. In the second round of the election he defeated outgoing MP Marcelle Ramonet (UMP) with 52.13% of the vote. In the National Assembly, he belonged to the Socialist, Radical, and Citizens Group. In July 2008, he was elected vice-president in charge of penal policy and served on the Laws Committee, working on the rights of prisoners. In 2008, he opposed the proposed law on security detention proposed by Rachida Dati, then Minister of Justice, and in 2010 was very critical of the law on gang violence proposed by Michèle Alliot-Marie.

Still unknown at the national level, he joined the national council of the PS as a full member at the end of the 2008 PS congress in Reims, during which he voted for Martine Aubry for party head. In 2009, he was made top security adviser to Aubry, then the leader of the Socialist Party. This post did not interest Urvoas at first. In this capacity, he was the general rapporteur of the "Forum of Ideas" organized by the SP on 17 November 2010 in Créteil. In the fall of 2011, Fayard published a book by Urvoas in which he presented 11 proposals to improve national security. At this time, he supported the presidential candidacy of Dominique Strauss-Kahn, then President of the IMF. He announced his support for François Hollande just days before the first round of the Socialist presidential primary of 2011. At the end of his first term, Éditions Odile Jacob published a book by Urvoas with Magali Alexandre a book entitled Survival Manual of the National Assembly: The Art of Parliamentary Guerrilla Warfare.

=== President of the Law Commission ===
In June 2012, Urvoas was re-elected in the parliamentary elections with 62.74% of the vote. On 26 June 2012 he was elected President of the Committee on Constitutional Law, Legislation, and General Administration of the Republic. At his initiative, the work of the Commission was made public. In April 2013, he issued a report on the issue of constitutionality in which he proposed several changes to the composition of the Constitutional Council, which he suggested transforming into a genuine Constitutional Court. In October 2013, with Dominique Bussereau and René Dosière, he published a report entitled "Opening a new cycle for the future of New Caledonia," which called for a new consensus among the various political forces of the territory.

Following the Cahuzac affair, Urvoas was appointed rapporteur of draft laws on transparency proposed by François Hollande. In 2013, he became director of the Thémis observatory of the Jean Jaurès Foundation, which is dedicated to justice and security issues and brings together judges, lawyers, police, academics, and politicians for debates and discussions.

He was the author and rapporteur of a constitutional law proposal to ratify the European Charter for Regional or Minority Languages, which the National Assembly adopted by a very large majority (361 votes in favor and 149 against) on 28 January 2014.

In June 2014, he published a book, For the Unification of Bretagne, in which he called for the creation of a single community by merging the region and 4 departments. In the fall of 2014, he opposed the vote on a government amendment extending the moratorium on the right to an individual cell for each prisoner. Also in 2014, he was named rapporteur on the reform of the National Assembly's rules that was initiated by its president, Claude Bartolone.

In August 2010, he became a member of the National Commission for Security Interceptions (CNCIS), an independent administrative authority responsible for ensuring the legality of interceptions of electronic correspondence. In May 2013, he published the first parliamentary report on the legal framework of intelligence activities. In it, he called for a law that would increase the level of supervise and control of the intelligence services’ activities. In the same year, the environmental group called for the creation of a commission of inquiry into the monitoring and surveillance of armed radical movements, a commission of which he was appointed rapporteur.

In his capacity as Chair of the Law Commission, he was one of the four deputies sitting in the Parliamentary Delegation to the Intelligence Services. In this capacity, he proposed amendments to the Military Programming Act that would have broaden parliamentary control of intelligence. He chaired this delegation in 2014 and published a monitoring report that included 105 proposals to reform intelligence. In 2015, he was the rapporteur of a bill on intelligence, offering nearly two hundred amendments that would broaden the Commission's control over intelligence activities.

In February 2015, he went to French Polynesia on behalf of the Law Commission to monitor the implementation of the 2004 law providing for territorial autonomy. In his report on his visit, he called for improvement in the arrangement and rejected the idea of making French Polynesia an "associated country." Since the beginning of 2015, he has also served as rapporteur of the mission in charge of the status of New Caledonia.

In the spring of 2015, in a report to the Prime Minister, he opposed the reinstatement of the crime of "national indignity" to punish terrorists, which he saw as a "secularization of excommunication" that would only serve to strengthen the "jihadist martyrology." In a May 2015 note to the Jean Jaurès Foundation, he called for greater autonomy for the prosecutor's office vis-à-vis the executive branch and pleaded for constitutional reform that would strengthen judiciary independence. In late 2015, he was the rapporteur of the proposal to modernize presidential election rules.

=== Minister of Justice ===
On 27 January 2016, Jean-Jacques Urvoas was named as the replacement to become the Minister of Justice for France. This after Christiane Taubira resigned as Minister of Justice of France, in protest of the new anti-terrorism law in France.

Upon assuming his post, he made the increase of the ministry's budget his main objective, arguing that the justice system was suffering from urgent problems. He received a 9% budget increase. He also addressed the problem of prison overcrowding. On 20 September 2016 he published a report, "Ending Overcrowding," which he presented at the Fresnes Prison. On 6 October 2016 he and Prime Minister Manuel Valls announced the construction of 33 new prisons.

On 3 February 2016 he presented a draft law, the Urvoas law, that was designed to strengthen the fight against organized crime, terrorism, and the financing thereof. The law was strongly criticized by some NGOs and political parties, which saw it as infringing upon judicial independence and individual freedoms. The law passed on 4 June 2016. In May 2016, he proposed a law that would make justice more simple and accessible, providing, for example, for divorce by mutual consent and the abolition of juvenile courts. In October 2016, he presented a plan to address the issue of radicalized prisoners.

In the 2017 primaries, Urvoas supported the candidacy of Manuel Valls for President. After Valls's defeat by Benoît Hamon, he announced that he would vote for the PS candidate in the first round of the presidential election. In May 2017, following the change of government, he was replaced as Minister of Justice by François Bayrou. In the legislative elections that followed, he was defeated by Annaïg Le Meur, whose victory came as a surprise.

=== Post-parliamentary activities ===
After the election of Emmanuel Macron at the Presidency, Jean-Jacques Urvoas delivered lectures at several French Universities including Paris Dauphine University.

=== After politics ===
In September 2017, Urvoas returned to the academic life, saying that he would teach in Quimper, Brest, Paris-Dauphine, and Sciences Po.

=== Controversies ===
==== Abbassène case ====
In 2008, Urvoas privately borrowed 203,206 euros from the National Assembly at 2% interest. When such loans were made illegal the next year, he paid them back through his representative commission expense allowance (IRFM), a practice abolished by the National Assembly in 2015. A civil servant named Jérôme Abbassène, who considered the loan a form of personal enrichment, went to the media with the story, and Cicero 29, a local anti-corruption organization, brought the case to court. Urvoas, in response, accused Abbassène of invading his privacy and demanded 20,000 euros in damages. Abbassène was ordered to pay 2,000 euros in damages and 1,000 euros in legal costs.

Early September 2017, Jean-Jacques Urvoas put a whistle-blower on trial, after having leaked the way how the parliamentary office real estate, bought with public funds, was litigiously stated in his own private assets for €210,000.

==== Solère case ====
While Minister of Justice, Urvoas, in violation of security rules, sent to the deputy of Hauts-de-Seine, Thierry Solère, a confidential note informing him of a police investigation against Solère for tax evasion, money laundering, and other crimes. The revelation of Urvoas's actions in December 2017 was described as a “judicial thunderclap” and led to an investigation of Urvoas.

In 2019 he was convicted of fraud.

Political offices
Preceded by Christiane Taubira	Minister of Justice; 2016–2017	Succeeded by François Bayrou
