= Marc Bécam =

French politician (1931–2021)

Mayor of Quimper
- In office 20 March 1977 – 18 March 1989
- Preceded by: Jean Lemeunier
- Succeeded by: Bernard Poignant

Member of the Departmental Council of Finistère
- In office 1973–1988
- Constituency: Canton of Quimper-1

Member of the Senate of France
- In office 2 October 1980 – 2 April 1986
- Preceded by: François Prigent
- Succeeded by: Alain Gérard
- Constituency: Finistère

Secretary of State for Local Authorities
- In office 1 April 1978 – 2 October 1980
- President: Valery Giscard d'Estaing
- Preceded by: position established
- Succeeded by: position abolished

Member of the French National Assembly
- In office 8 May 1967 – 30 May 1968
- Preceded by: Edmond Michelet
- Succeeded by: Edmond Michelet
- Constituency: Finistère's 1st constituency
- In office 23 July 1969 – 6 May 1978
- Preceded by: Edmond Michelet
- Succeeded by: Jacques Guinebretière
- Constituency: Finistère's 1st constituency

Personal details
- Born: 9 October 1931 Saint-Martin-des-Champs, France
- Died: 21 April 2021 (aged 89) Quimper, France
- Party: RPR

Marc Bécam (9 October 1931 – 21 April 2021) was a French politician. A member of the Rally for the Republic, he was best known as Mayor of Quimper.

== Biography ==
The son of an engineer, Bécam studied agricultural engineering and began his career with the Fédération nationale des syndicats d'exploitants agricoles in Brittany, where he worked when Breton farmers revolted and took over Morlaix in 1961.

Bécam entered politics in the late 1960s, when he was elected to the National Assembly to represent Finistère's 1st constituency. He also served as Mayor of Quimper and was a Senator for Finistère from 1980 to 1986. A Gaullist, he was close to the Union of Democrats for the Republic before joining the Rally for the Republic. He then became an independent politician. He had favorable views on abortion and was anti-death penalty, as seen in his votes for the Veil Act and for abolition of capital punishment.

Marc Bécam died in Quimper on 21 April 2021 at the age of 89.
