= Lot-et-Garonne's 3rd constituency =

Constituency of the National Assembly of France

3rd constituency of Lot-et-Garonne
- inline Constituency of the National Assembly of France

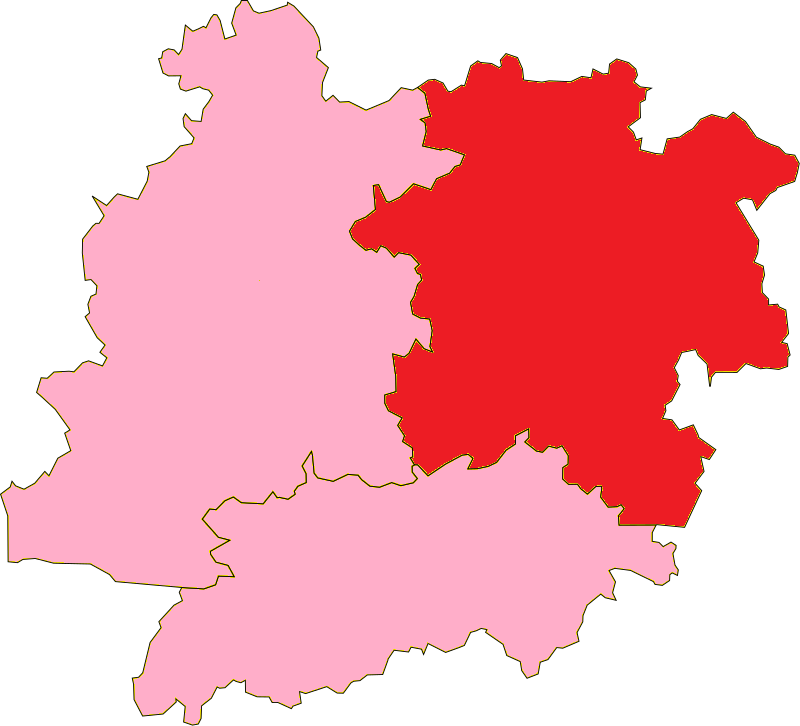
- Lot-et-Garonne's 3rd Constituency shown within Lot-et-Garonne
- Deputy: Guillaume Lepers; LR
- Department: Lot-et-Garonne
- Cantons: Beauville, Cancon, Castillonnès, Fumel, Laroque-Timbaut, Monclar, Monflanquin, Penne-d'Agenais, Prayssas, Sainte-Livrade-sur-Lot, Tournon-d'Agenais, Villeneuve-sur-Lot Nord, Villeneuve-sur-Lot Sud, Villeréal
- Registered voters: 75664

The 3rd constituency of Lot-et-Garonne (French: Troisième circonscription de Lot-et-Garonne) is a French legislative constituency in the Lot-et-Garonne département. Like the other 576 French constituencies, it elects one MP using a two round electoral system.

== Description ==
The 3rd Constituency of Lot-et-Garonne covers the north east portion of the Department.

Politically since 1988 the seat has swung between the mainstream left and right broadly in line with the national trend. A By-election was held in the seat in 2013 following the resignation of Jérôme Cahuzac as a result of a scandal regarding his ownership of secret bank accounts as revealed by the Panama Papers.

In common with the other two seats in Lot-et-Garonne it voted for the En Marche candidate at the 2017 election. That election featured a strong performance by the National Front whereby their candidate secured 2nd place in the 1st round of voting and nearly 40% in the run off.

== Assembly members ==
| Election | Member | Party |
|---|---|---|
| 1988 | Marcel Garrouste | PS |
| 1993 | Daniel Soulage | UDF |
| 1997 | Jérôme Cahuzac | PS |
| 2002 | Alain Merly | UDF |
| 2007 | Jérôme Cahuzac | PS |
| 2012 | Jérôme Cahuzac | PS |
| 2013 | Jean-Louis Costes | UMP |
| 2017 | Olivier Damaisin | LREM |
| 2022 | Annick Cousin | RN |
| 2024 | Guillaume Lepers | LR |

== Election results ==
=== 2024 ===
| Candidate | Party | Alliance | First round | | Second round | |
| Candidate | Party | Alliance | Votes | % | Votes | % |
|---|---|---|---|---|---|---|
| Guillaume Lepers | LR | DVD | 12,876 | 24.99 | 27,689 | 54.13 |
| Annick Cousin | RN | | 21,170 | 41.08 | 23,464 | 45.87 |
| Xavier Czapla | LFI | NPF | 9,504 | 18.44 | | |
| Jerôme Cahuzac | Independent | DVG | 7,457 | 14.47 | | |
| Bernadette Gasc | LO | | 521 | 1.01 | | |
| Valid votes | | | 51,528 | 97.22 | 51,153 | 95.65 |
| Blank votes | | | 900 | 1.70 | 804 | 1.50 |
| Null votes | | | 576 | 1.09 | 804 | 1.50 |
| Turnout | | | 53,004 | 69.94 | 53,480 | 70.57 |
| Abstentions | | | 22,782 | 30.06 | 22,304 | 29.43 |
| Registered voters | | | 75,786 | | 75,784 | |
| Result | | | LR GAIN OVER RN | | | |

=== 2022 ===
Legislative Election 2022: Lot-et-Garonne's 3rd constituency
| Party | Candidate | Votes | % | ±% |
|---|---|---|---|---|
| RN | Annick Cousin | 9,664 | 24.96 | +5.15 |
| LFI (NUPÉS) | Xavier Czapla | 8,871 | 22.91 | +0.94 |
| LREM (Ensemble) | Olivier Damaisin | 7,802 | 20.15 | −9.98 |
| LR (UDC) | Jean-Louis Costes | 5,361 | 13.84 | −5.28 |
| REC | Geoffroy Gary | 2,267 | 5.85 | N/A |
| LMR | Alain Merly | 1,435 | 3.71 | N/A |
| MoDem | Pierre Soubiran* | 908 | 2.34 | N/A |
| PRG | Jacques Vialettes | 866 | 2.24 | N/A |
| Others | N/A | 1,551 | 4.01 | |
| Turnout | | 38,725 | 52.51 | +0.20 |
2nd round result
| RN | Annick Cousin | 18,747 | 56.97 | +17.40 |
| LFI (NUPÉS) | Xavier Czapla | 14,161 | 43.03 | N/A |
| Turnout | | 32,908 | 51.46 | +8.28 |
| RN gain from LREM | | | | |

* MoDem dissident

=== 2017 ===
Legislative Election 2017: Lot-et-Garonne's 3rd constituency
| Party | Candidate | Votes | % | ±% |
|---|---|---|---|---|
| LREM | Olivier Damaisin | 11,922 | 30.13 | |
| FN | Étienne Bousquet-Cassagne | 7,839 | 19.81 | |
| LR | Jean-Louis Costes | 7,566 | 19.12 | |
| LFI | Rémy Garnier | 4,833 | 12.21 | |
| PS | Guillaume Molierac | 2,437 | 6.16 | |
| DVD | Arnaud Devilliers | 1,431 | 3.62 | |
| EELV | Lionel Feuillas | 1,424 | 3.60 | |
| Others | N/A | 2,122 | | |
| Turnout | | 39,574 | 52.31 | |
2nd round result
| LREM | Olivier Damaisin | 19,743 | 60.43 | |
| FN | Étienne Bousquet-Cassagne | 12,926 | 39.57 | |
| Turnout | | 32,669 | 43.18 | |
| LREM gain from LR | | | | |

=== 2012 ===
2012 legislative election in Lot-Et-Garonne's 3rd constituency
| Candidate | Party | First round | | Second round | |
| Candidate | Party | Votes | % | Votes | % |
|---|---|---|---|---|---|
| Jérôme Cahuzac | PS | 22,572 | 46.86% | 28,307 | 61.48% |
| Jean-Louis Costes | UMP | 13,006 | 27.00% | 17,733 | 38.52% |
| Catherine Martin | FN | 7,566 | 15.71% | | |
| Marie-Hélène Loiseau | FG | 2,169 | 4.50% | | |
| Lionel Feuillas | EELV | 977 | 2.03% | | |
| Hervé Lebreton | | 583 | 1.21% | | |
| Camille Morel | DLR | 548 | 1.14% | | |
| Brigitte Tichane | AEI | 312 | 0.65% | | |
| Luc Chevillotte | NPA | 311 | 0.65% | | |
| Mohamed El Marbati | LO | 127 | 0.26% | | |
| Valid votes | | 48,171 | 98.33% | 46,040 | 96.17% |
| Spoilt and null votes | | 817 | 1.67% | 1,832 | 3.83% |
| Votes cast / turnout | | 48,988 | 64.16% | 47,872 | 62.69% |
| Abstentions | | 27,368 | 35.84% | 28,489 | 37.31% |
| Registered voters | | 76,356 | 100.00% | 76,361 | 100.00% |
