= Brigitte of Menez-Hom =

Bronze statue

- Brigitte du Ménez-Hom
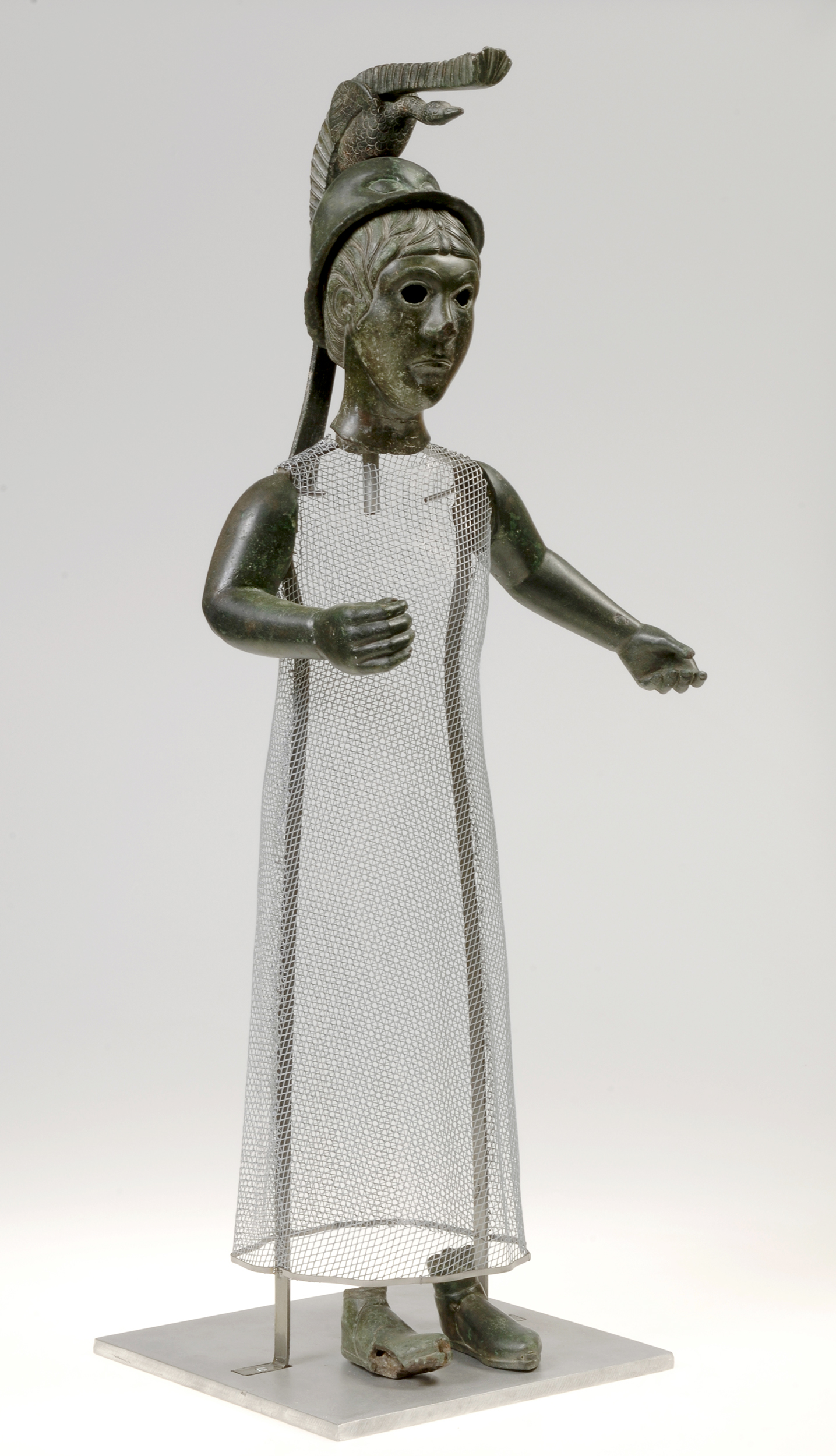
- Type: Statue
- Material: Bronze
- Height: 70 centimetres (28 in)
- Period/culture: First century CE
- Discovered: 1913
- Present location: Brittany Museum
- Culture: Greco-Roman or Irish

The Brigitte of Ménez-Hom, also called the Goddess of Ménez-Hom is a bronze statue discovered in 1913 in Dinéault, a commune in Finistère in western France. Dated to the second half of the first century CE, it is considered to be one of the oldest woman figurines from Brittany. It was discovered by chance by a farmer, Jean Labat, while ploughing his field. The sculpture measures about 70 cm (28 in) in height and is made from a ternary alloy of copper.

Initially kept by Labat, the statue was later given to Antoine Vourc'h. When the latter died, his daughter, who had inherited it, wanted to give it to a German priest who intended to sell it to help an orphanage in Chile. Finally, with the help of a support committee, the departure of the statue to South America was prevented and the object was acquired by the Brittany Museum in Rennes in 1972.

Professor of ancient history Gérard Moitrieux believes that the composition is similar to the figures of Minerva which were frequent in Gaul. However, Brest based archaeologist, historian and lecturer René Sanquer, who studied the statue, believes that it is a different from Minerva from Greco-Roman mythology, and identified her rather with the goddess Brigit found in Irish texts from the early Middle Ages and with Brigantia in Roman Britain.

== History ==
The statue was discovered in May 1913 by Jean Labat, a farmer living in the hamlet of Kerguilly in Dinéault. While ploughing deep, Labat deducted his plough hitting a metal object. It turned out to be a bronze figurine head wearing a helmet topped with a representation of a bird, measuring 23 cm (9.1 in). There were scratches at the tip of the nose and under the left eye, probably made by the plough. He took it back to his parents' farm and stowed it away in a drawer. Fifteen years later, in 1928, Labat decided to search for the rest of the statue. He discovered the body in a cylindrical cavity about 1 m (3 ft 3 in) deep in the clay. The body of the statue was in poor condition, as the hammered bronze sheet which constituted the body was susceptible to corrosion. However, the other cast bronze pieces covered with a dark green patina were intact. No one then realized the importance of this discovery, and Labat kept it himself. In about 1935, he gave it to the doctor in Plomodiern, Antoine Vourc'h. The object was buried again during the Second World War in order to save it from the Germans and was later exhumed around 1945. Being buried degraded the bronze sheet body which was not well preserved.

On the death of D Vourc'h, his daughter, M Robain, inherited the large statuette. She donated it to the German priest André Schloesser. Schloesser wanted to sell it at auction in order to get the best price to finance a social promotion institute for an orphanage in Chile. In 1971, when it was about to be transported to South America, the archaeologist, historian and lecturer René Sanquer, learned of its existence and considered that it was an inestimable treasure probably dating from the second half of the first century CE. The statue is considered to be one of the oldest representation of a woman from Brittany. With a support committee, Sanquer managed to prevent the object from leaving France. The statue was acquired by the Brittany Museum in Rennes in 1972 with the support of Henri Fréville.

== Description ==
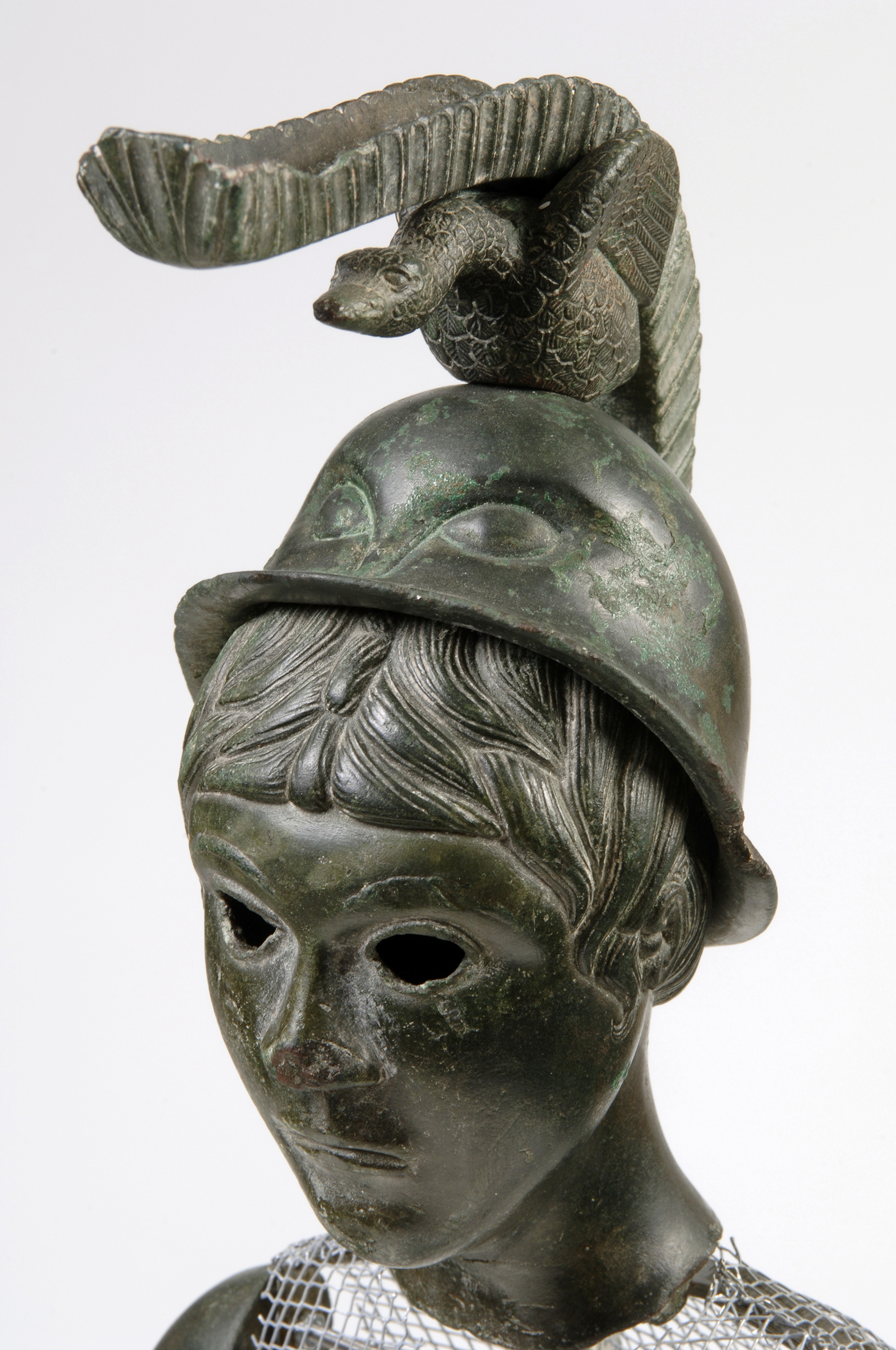
Head and face detail

The statue measures approximately 70 cm (28 in) in height. According to Sanquer, the fine head, which is on a gracefully flared and natural neck, is that of an adolescent girl of about fifteen years old. As per Sanquer, the mouth dips slightly at the corners, seeming to give an expression of melancholy in the face. The head is oval in shape, with a round, fleshy chin, slightly defined cheekbones, and full, smooth cheeks. The forehead is low and receding. The nose, which was damaged by Labat's plough, is regular and in the shape of a three-sided pyramid. The eyes, which were probably made of glass paste, were missing. The ears do not have the same anatomical accuracy as the other parts of the face and is a "double spiral line enclosing a pearl" with lower and upper lobes of the same size. The hairstyle has been done with great care with strands well isolated from each other.

The limbs are disproportionate to the head. Thus, the upper limbs and feet are too small while the right arm is stronger than the left. The right arm measuring 12.4 cm (4.9 in) long, is bent at a right angle and the hand appears to be closed around a cylindrical object. The left arm, half stretched downwards, measures 15.8 cm (6.2 in) long and is half-open hand. The fingers of the hands are thin and long with nails. The feet measure about 7.5 cm (3.0 in), and are covered with shoes with a thick, flat sole. While the left foot is placed flat, supporting the weight of the statue, the right foot is half-flexed, indicating a slight swaying of the body.

The helmet consists of a bomb, a crest, and a crest holder. A face is drawn on the bell-shaped bomb with flared edges, evoking Athena's owl. A bird, which could be a goose or a swan, serves as the crest-bearer. According to ornithologists who observed the statue, it is believed to be a wild swan, as the goose's neck is shorter. The crest is of the bifid and long type, ending at one end with three small balls, one of which is missing.

== Manufacturing technique ==
The craftsman used hollow casting technique to make the statue with fragments of cores preserved inside the arms and the bird. There is no trace of welding at the joints, even if bronze sheets were probably used to repair defects during demolding. The artist probably used iron rich foundry sand, and the statue is made of a ternary alloy, with approximately 75% copper, 13% tin and 8% lead.
