= List of senators of Finistère =

Location of Finistère in France

Following is a list of senators of Finistère, people who have represented the department of Finistère in the Senate of France.

== Third Republic ==
Senators for Finistère under the French Third Republic were:

- Émile Forsanz (1876–1882)
- François Marie Monjaret de Kerjégu (1876–1882)
- Arnold de Raismes (18761894)
- François Soubigou (1876–1894)
- Hippolyte Halna du Fretay (1882–1893)
- Édouard Le Guen (1882–1894)
- Joseph Astor (1890–1894)
- Louis Delobeau (1893–1912)
- Pierre Drouillard (1894–1895)
- Corentin Halléguen (1894–1899)
- Alexis Savary (1894–1899)
- Armand Rousseau (1895–1896)
- Henri Ponthier de Chamaillard (1897–1908)
- Arsène Lambert (1900–1901)
- Louis Pichon (1900–1916)
- Adolphe Porquier (1901–1903)
- Jules de Cuverville (1901–1912)
- Armand Gassis (1903–1912)
- Jules Fortin (1908–1930)
- Louis Hémon (1912–1914)
- Émile Villiers (1912–1921)
- Maurice Fenoux (1912–1930)
- Louis Le Guillou de Penanros (1914–1920)
- Théodore Le Hars (1920–1928)
- Albert Louppe (1921–1927)
- Ferdinand Lancien (1921–1945)
- Yves Guillemot (1927–1939)
- Georges Le Bail (1928–1937)
- Jules Le Louédec (1930–1931)
- Yves Tanguy (1931–1939)
- Victor Pierre Le Gorgeu (1931–1945)
- Jacques Queinnec (1937–1945)
- François Halna du Fretay (1939–1945)
- Olivier Le Jeune (1939–1945)

== Fourth Republic ==
Senators for Finistère under the French Fourth Republic were:

- Albert Jaouen (1946–1948)
- Jules Hippolyte Masson (1946–1955)
- Antoine Vourc'h (1946–1955)
- Yves Jaouen (1946–1959)
- Joseph Pinvidic (1948–1951)
- Yves Le Bot (1951–1959)
- Jean-Louis Rolland (1955–1959)
- Xavier Trellu (1955–1959)

== Fifth Republic ==
Senators for Finistère under the French Fifth Republic:

In office	Name	Group	Notes
1959–1962	Jean Fichoux	Groupe des Républicains et Indépendants	
1959–1971	Yves Hamon	Groupe Union Centriste	
1959–1971	André Monteil	Groupe de l'Union Centriste des Démocrates de Progrès	
1959–1978	André Colin	Groupe de l'Union Centriste des Démocrates de Progrès	Died in office 29 August 1978
1962–1971	Louis Guillou	Groupe de l'Union Centriste des Démocrates de Progrès	
1971–1980	Louis Orvoën	Groupe Union Centriste	
1971–1989	Georges Lombard	Groupe Union Centriste	
1971–1998	Édouard Le Jeune	Groupe Union Centriste	
1978–1980	François Prigent	Groupe Union Centriste	Replaced André Colin on 30 August 1978
1980–1986	Marc Bécam	Groupe du Rassemblement pour la République	Resigned 2 April 1986 (elected deputy)
1980–1998	Alphonse Arzel	Groupe Union Centriste	
1986–2008	Alain Gérard	Groupe Union pour un Mouvement Populaire	Elected 28 September 1986 (by-election)
1989–1998	Jacques de Menou	Groupe du Rassemblement pour la République	
1998–2008	Yolande Boyer	Groupe socialiste	
1998–2008	Louis Le Pensec	Groupe socialiste	
1998–2017	François Marc	Groupe socialiste et républicain	Resigned 24 September 2017
2008–present	Maryvonne Blondin	Groupe socialiste et républicain	
2008–2014	Jean-Luc Fichet	Groupe socialiste et républicain	
2008–2014	Philippe Paul	Groupe Les Républicains	
2014–present	Michel Canévet	Groupe Union Centriste	
2017–present	Jean-Luc Fichet	Groupe socialiste et républicain	Repleced François Marc on 25 September 2017

== Sources ==
- Liste des anciens sénateurs de la IIIème République par circonscription (in French), Sénat de France
- Liste des anciens sénateurs de la IVème République par circonscription (in French), Sénat de France
- Liste des anciens sénateurs de la Vème République par circonscription (in French), Sénat de France
- Liste par département – Finistère (in French), Sénat de France
