= Jules de Cuverville =

French politician

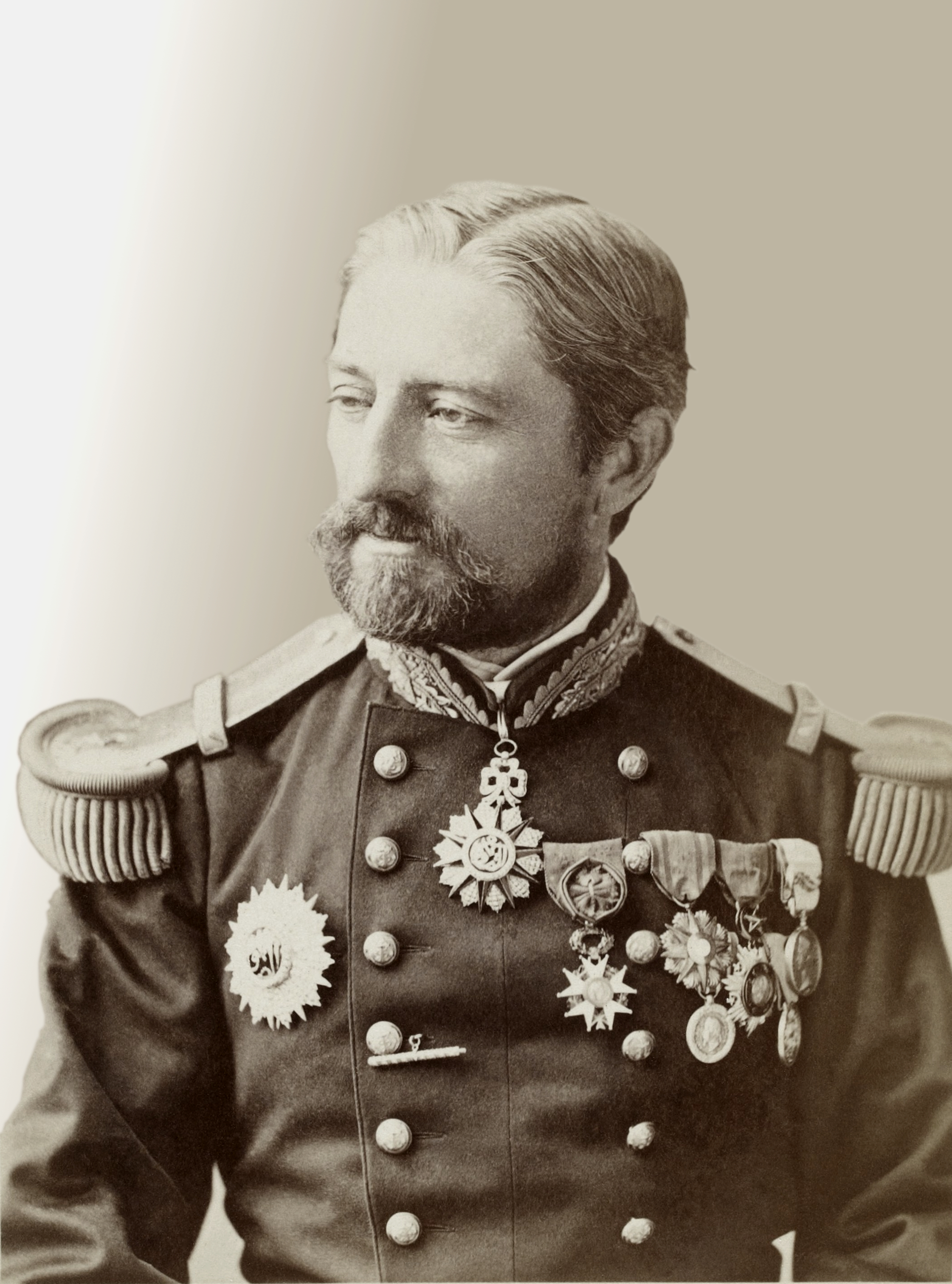
Jules Marie Armand de Cavelier de Cuverville Marc Gambier, ca 1885

Jules de Cuverville (French pronunciation: [ʒyl də kyvɛʁvil]; 28 July 1834 – 14 March 1912) was a French naval officer who rose to become Chief of Staff of the French Navy. He entered politics in later life, elected to the senate where between 1901 and 1912 he represented Finistère.

== Life ==
Jules Marie Armand de Cuverville was born at Allineuc, a small village a short distance inland from Saint-Brieuc in Brittany. His father was Louis-Paul de Cuverville who represented the locality on the monarchist benches in the National Assembly between 1849 and 1853. Louis-Paul's family was descended from the lords of the manor at Maucomble in Normandy, some of whom had been Squires to French kings. Other kinsmen included sailors and naval officers, such as his grandfather, the Rear Admiral Louis-Hyacinthe Cavelier de Cuverville.

Jules Marie attended school at Saint Sauveur de Redon and the lycée in Rennes before entering naval college in 1850. He emerged in 1852 and participated at the Siege of Sevastopol (1854–55), where he was badly wounded. There were further missions in Africa and in the Crimea. He served in Algeria as deputy to Vice-admiral de Gueydon between 1871 and 1873. He was briefly given command of the avisos "Kleber" and "Cuvier" before being seconded to the diplomatic service, serving as naval attache at the French embassy in London during the middle 1870s. He then returned to France, serving aboard the Inferent as a commander with the South Atlantic Naval Division between 1875 and 1879, and promoted to the rank of ship's captain in 1878, taking command of a succession of training ships. He was promoted to the rank of rear admiral in 1888 and appointed a member of the Admiralty Council. Between 1890 and 1892 he served as head of the North Atlantic Naval division and was involved in the Pacification of Dahomey.

He became a vice-admiral in 1893, and then Maritime Prefect for Cherbourg, a member of the Upper Admiralty Council, commander of the Reserve Mediterranean Squadron in 1897 and inspector-general of the marine in 1898. He was Chief of Staff of the French Navy between 1898 and 1899.

Jules de Cuverville was elected to the senate on 31 March 1901 in a by-election caused by the death of the previous incumbent, General Arsène Lambert, who had died. He was re-elected in the general election of 4 January 1903. He lost his seat to Maurice Fenoux by a narrow margin on 7 January 1912, however.

Brittany, then as subsequently, was relatively conservative in religious terms, and during the summer of 1902 Jules de Cuverville was among those at Le Folgoët, vigorously opposing the closure of the school of the Daughters of the Holy Spirit, and the concomitant expulsion of the nuns there. The sisters had fallen foul of the anti-congragationist legislation which was part of the Paris-based government's determined pursuit of Laïcité (separation of secular and religious institutions).

A friend and political ally of Jacques Piou, he joined the Popular Liberal Action (political party), becoming one of its most passionate supporters. He was appointed a party vice-president in 1907. Deeply Catholic and steadfast in his commitment to the Third Republic, Admiral Count de Cuverville had two principal political priorities: defence of the church and support for the navy.

Several months after losing his seat in the senate, Jules de Cuverville was crushed by a truck driver while crossing the street in Paris. He survived long enough to be taken to his home at 15, rue Dugay-Trouin, but died a few hours later.
