= Finistère's 1st constituency =

Constituency of the National Assembly of France

1st constituency of Finistère
- inline Constituency of the National Assembly of France

- Constituency in department

- Finistère in France
- Deputy: Annaïg Le Meur; RE
- Department: Finistère
- Cantons: Briec, Fouesnant, Quimper-1, Quimper-2, Quimper-3

The 1st constituency of Finistère is a French legislative constituency in the Finistère département. Like the other 576 French constituencies, it elects one MP using the two-round system, with a run-off if no candidate receives over 50% of the vote in the first round.

== Deputies ==
Election	Member	Party
1958	Hervé Nader	UNR
1962	Roger Evrard	UNR
1967	Edmond Michelet	UDR
1968	Edmond Michelet	UDR
1973	Marc Bécam	UDR
1978	Marc Bécam	RPR
1981	Bernard Poignant	PS
1986	Proportional representation - no election by constituency	
1988	Bernard Poignant	PS
1993	André Angot	RPR
1997	André Angot	RPR
2002	Marcelle Ramonet	UMP
2007	Jean-Jacques Urvoas	PS
2012	Jean-Jacques Urvoas	PS
2017	Annaïg Le Meur	LREM
2022	Annaïg Le Meur	LREM
2024	Annaïg Le Meur	RE

== Election results ==
=== 2024 ===
Candidate	Party	Alliance	First round			Second round		
Candidate	Party	Alliance	Votes	%	+/–	Votes	%	+/–
Annaïg Le Meur	RE	ENS	22,422	33.00	-5.49	27,066	39.70	-14.19
Grégory Lebert	LÉ	NFP	22,303	32.83	+0.75	24,096	35.34	-10.77
Christel Hénaff	RN		16,083	23.67	+12.80	17,015	24.96	N/A
Alain Le Grand	LR		5,652	8.32	+0.96			
Serge Hardy	LO		858	1.26	+0.25			
France Herman	REC		620	0.91	-2.72			
Valid votes			67,938	97.63	+0.09	68,177	97.30	+3.08
Blank votes			1,156	1.66	+0.06	1,347	1.92	-2.00
Null votes			495	0.54	-0.15	545	0.78	-1.08
Turnout			69,589	75.36	+20.91	70,069	75.87	+21.60
Abstentions			22,747	24.64	-20.91	22,280	24.13	-21.60
Registered voters			92,336			92,349		
Source: Ministry of the Interior, Le Monde
Result						RE HOLD		

=== 2022 ===
Legislative Election 2022: Finistère's 1st constituency
Party	Candidate	Votes	%	±%
LREM (Ensemble)	Annaïg Le Meur	17,432	35.49	-2.72
EELV (NUPÉS)	Grégory Lebert	15,760	32.08	-3.52
RN	Christel Hénaff	5,339	10.87	+4.72
UDI (UDC)	Isabelle Ménard	3,615	7.36	−4.51
LR	Georges-Philippe Fontaine*	2,266	4.61	N/A
REC	France Herman	1,782	3.63	N/A
UDB	Bernard Le Rest	1,213	2.47	N/A
Others	N/A	1,715	3.49	
Turnout		49,122	54.45	−2.47
2nd round result
LREM (Ensemble)	Annaïg Le Meur	25,447	53.89	-0.56
EELV (NUPÉS)	Grégory Lebert	21,772	46.11	+0.56
Turnout		47,219	54.27	+6.75
LREM hold				

* LR dissident

=== 2017 ===
Candidate	Label	First round		Second round	
Candidate	Label	Votes	%	Votes	%
Annaïg Le Meur	REM	18,980	38.21	20,925	54.45
Jean-Jacques Urvoas	PS	9,822	19.77	17,502	45.55
Claire Levry-Gérard	UDI	5,896	11.87		
Jugdeep Harvinder	FI	4,946	9.96		
Christel Hénaff	FN	3,057	6.15		
Jean-Pierre Bigorgne	ECO	2,325	4.68		
Christian Rose	DVD	1,091	2.20		
Yves Brun	REG	1,007	2.03		
Yvonne Rainero	PCF	590	1.19		
Jeannine Le Du	DLF	550	1.11		
Alain Rousseau	EXD	417	0.84		
Uisant Créquer	DVG	407	0.82		
Marie-Françoise Mao	DIV	298	0.60		
Serge Hardy	EXG	293	0.59		
Votes		49,679	100.00	38,427	100.00
Valid votes		49,679	98.22	38,427	90.99
Blank votes		597	1.18	2,639	6.25
Null votes		304	0.60	1,164	2.76
Turnout		50,580	56.92	42,230	47.52
Abstentions		38,281	43.08	46,636	52.48
Registered voters		88,861		88,866	
Source: Ministry of the Interior

=== 2012 ===
2012 legislative election in Finistere's 1st constituency
Candidate	Party	First round		Second round	
Candidate	Party	Votes	%	Votes	%
Jean-Jacques Urvoas	PS	25,959	49.38%	31,566	62.74%
Georges-Philippe Fontaine	UMP	14,335	27.27%	18,743	37.26%
Alain Rousseau	FN	3,757	7.15%		
Martine Petit	EELV	2,775	5.28%		
André Bernard	FG	2,590	4.93%		
Corine Nicolas	MoDem	1,399	2.66%		
Pierre Langlais	PR	897	1.71%		
Hubert Bodin	PCD	596	1.13%		
Serge Hardy	LO	248	0.47%		
Silviane Le Menn		9	0.02%		
Valid votes		52,565	98.54%	50,309	97.09%
Spoilt and null votes		781	1.46%	1,509	2.91%
Votes cast / turnout		53,346	62.09%	51,818	60.32%
Abstentions		32,571	37.91%	34,081	39.68%
Registered voters		85,917	100.00%	85,899	100.00%

=== 2007 ===
Legislative Election 2007: Finistère's 1st constituency
Party	Candidate	Votes	%	±%
UMP	Marcelle Ramonet	23,200	40.94	
PS	Jean-Jacques Urvoas	16,922	29.86	
LV	Daniel Le Bigot	5,735	10.12	
MoDem	Isabelle Le Bal	5,567	9.82	
Far left	Janine Carrasco	1,592	2.81	
PCF	Yvonne Rainero	1,304	2.30	
Others	N/A	2,345		
Turnout		57,402	67.75	
2nd round result
PS	Jean-Jacques Urvoas	29,539	52.13	
UMP	Marcelle Ramonet	27,122	47.87	
Turnout		57,950	68.41	
PS gain from UMP				

=== 2002 ===
Legislative Election 2002: Finistère's 1st constituency
Party	Candidate	Votes	%	±%
LV	Daniel Le Bigot	13,979	25.72	
UMP	Marcelle Ramonet	13,647	25.11	
UMP	Benoit Lecomte	9,395	17.29	
DVG	Marc Andro	6,884	12.67	
FN	Rene Corler	2,376	4.37	
DVG	Baudoin de Pimodan	1,814	3.34	
PCF	Yvonne Rainero	1,491	2.74	
Others	N/A	4,755		
Turnout		55,338	69.68	
2nd round result
UMP	Marcelle Ramonet	28,344	51.90	
LV	Daniel Le Bigot	26,270	48.10	
Turnout		56,242	70.83	
UMP hold				

=== 1997 ===
Legislative Election 1997: Finistère's 1st constituency
Party	Candidate	Votes	%	±%
RPR	André Angot	19,571	38.78	
PS	Bernard Poignant	15,026	29.77	
FN	Michel Dor	4,260	8.44	
PCF	Yvonne Rainero	3,853	7.63	
LV	Alain Uguen	2,598	5.15	
GE	Xavier Maréchal	1,332	2.64	
Others	N/A	3,831		
Turnout		52,627	70.90	
2nd round result
RPR	André Angot	28,891	52.94	
PS	Bernard Poignant	25,685	47.06	
Turnout		57,117	76.95	
RPR hold				

== Sources ==
- Official results of French elections from 1998: "Résultats électoraux officiels en France" (in French). Archived from the original on 20 December 2011.
