= Annaïg Le Meur =

French politician

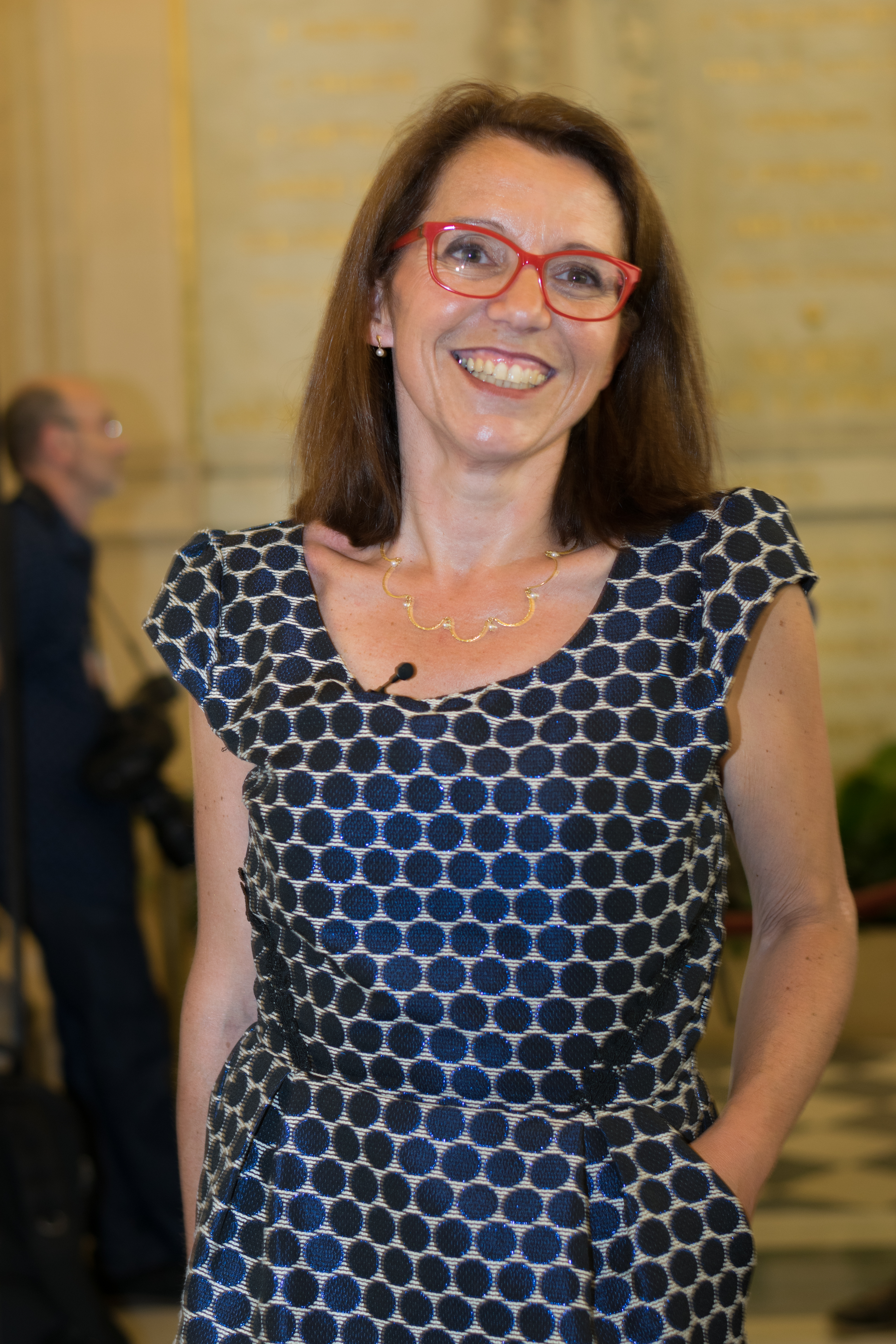

Member of the National Assembly for Finistère's 1st constituency
- Incumbent
- Assumed office 21 June 2017
- Preceded by: Jean-Jacques Urvoas

Personal details
- Born: 29 April 1973 (age 53) Brest, France
- Party: Renaissance
- Education: Grenoble Alpes University

Annaïg Le Meur (born 29 April 1973) is a French politician representing Renaissance (RE) who was elected to the French National Assembly on 18 June 2017, representing Finistère's 1st constituency.

== Political career ==
In parliament, Le Meur serves on the Committee on Economic Affairs. In addition to her committee assignments, she is a member of the French-Kuwaiti Parliamentary Friendship Group.

== Political positions ==
In July 2019, Le Meur voted in favor of the French ratification of the European Union’s Comprehensive Economic and Trade Agreement (CETA) with Canada.

== See also ==
- 2017 French legislative election
