= Marcel Garrouste =

French politician (1921–2021)

Member of the French National Assembly
- In office 23 June 1988 – 1 April 1993
- Preceded by: position established (party-list proportional system)
- Succeeded by: Daniel Soulage
- Constituency: Lot-et-Garonne's 3rd constituency
- In office 3 April 1978 – 1 April 1986
- Constituency: Lot-et-Garonne's 3rd constituency

Mayor of Penne-d'Agenais
- In office March 1971 – March 1983
- Succeeded by: Gisèle Graf

General Councilor of the Canton of Penne-d'Agenais
- In office 1976–1982
- Preceded by: Jacques Bordeneuve
- Succeeded by: René Lalbat

Personal details
- Born: 22 April 1921 Trémons, France
- Died: 5 September 2021 (aged 100)
- Party: PS

Marcel Garrouste (22 April 1921 – 5 September 2021) was a French politician. A member of the Socialist Party (PS), he served as a member of the National Assembly from 1978 to 1986, and again from 1988 to 1993.

== Biography ==
Garrouste served as Mayor of Penne-d'Agenais from 1971 to 1983 and as General Councilor of the Canton of Penne-d'Agenais from 1976 to 1982. He was elected to the National Assembly in 1976, serving Lot-et-Garonne's 3rd constituency and was re-elected in 1981. He returned to the National Assembly in 1988 before retiring in 1993. He published his autobiography in 2018.

Marcel Garrouste died on 5 September 2021 at the age of 100.

== Books ==
- Modes de vie et traditions populaires en Quercy et en Agenais (2015)
- Un paysan à l'Assemblée nationale (2018)
