= Daniel Soulage =

French politician (1942–2020)

Member of the French Senate for Lot-et-Garonne
- In office 23 September 2001 – 30 September 2011
- Succeeded by: Pierre Camani

Member of the National Assembly
- In office 2 April 1993 – 21 April 1997
- Preceded by: Marcel Garrouste
- Succeeded by: Jérôme Cahuzac
- Constituency: Lot-et-Garonne's 3rd constituency

Personal details
- Born: 14 February 1942 Monflanquin, France
- Died: 14 September 2020 (aged 78) Monflanquin, France
- Party: Centrist Alliance

Daniel Soulage (14 February 1942 – 14 September 2020) was a French politician.

Soulage was born in Monflanquin, Lot-et-Garonne, and served as deputy mayor of his hometown starting in 1978. He was elected to the mayoralty in 1983, retaining the office until 2008. Soulage was a member of the Senate of France from 2001 to 2011, representing Lot-et-Garonne department. Between 1993 and 1997, he served on the National Assembly from Lot-et-Garonne's 3rd constituency. While a deputy, Soulage was a member of the Union for French Democracy. During his senatorial tenure, he joined the Centrist Alliance and caucused with the Centrist Union.

== Biography ==
A Farmer by profession, Daniel Soulage was a UDF deputy for the 3rd constituency of Union for French Democracy between 1993 and 1997.

Elected senator for Lot-et-Garonne on September 23, 2001, in the second round, with 60.75% of the vote, he sat with the RDSE group until 2002, then with the Centrist Union group, of which he was vice-president until the end of his term in 2011.

He died on September 14, 2020.
