= Guillaume Lepers =

French politician (born 1978)

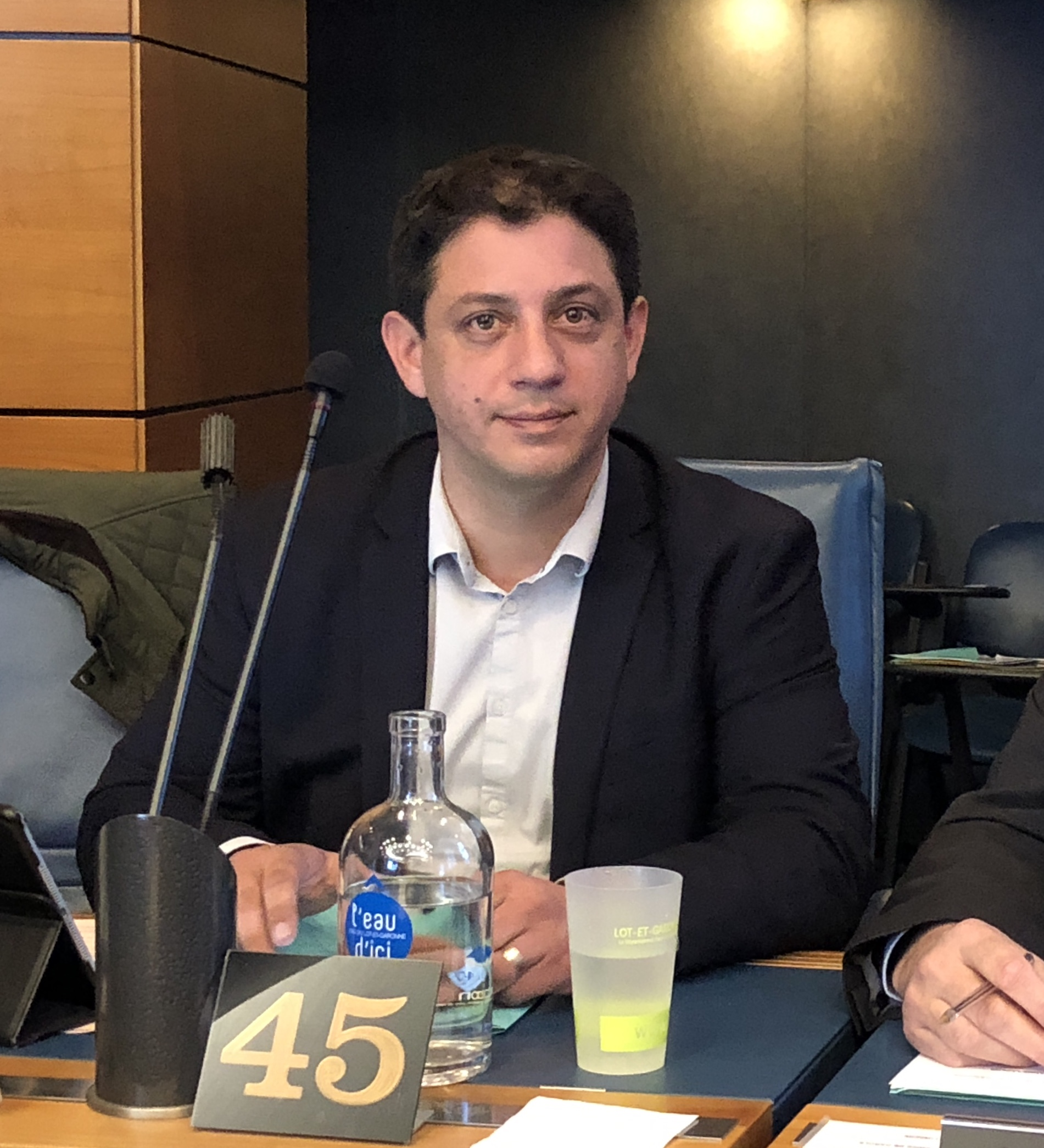
- Lepers in 2018

Member of the French National Assembly for Lot-et-Garonne's 3rd constituency
- Incumbent
- Assumed office 18 July 2024
- Preceded by: Annick Cousin

Personal details
- Born: 21 December 1978 (age 46)
- Political party: The Republicans

Guillaume Lepers (born 21 December 1978) is a French politician for The Republicans. He was elected member of the National Assembly for Lot-et-Garonne's 3rd constituency in 2024.
