= Opinion polling for the 2022 French legislative election =

This page lists public opinion polls conducted for the 2022 French legislative election, which were held in two rounds on 12 and 19 June 2022. Unless otherwise noted, all polls listed below are compliant with the regulations of the national polling commission (Commission nationale des sondages) and utilize the quota method.

== First round ==
=== Graphical summary ===
Local regression of polls conducted

=== Party alliances standings ===
Polling firm	Fieldwork date	Sample size	LO NPA EXG	NUPES				DVG PRG FGR	ECO	PA	ENS	DVC	UDC	DVD	DLF LP	RN	REC EXD	REG	DIV
Polling firm	Fieldwork date	Sample size	LO NPA EXG	PCF	LFI	PÉ	PS	DVG PRG FGR	ECO	PA	ENS	DVC	UDC	DVD	DLF LP	RN	REC EXD	REG	DIV
Ministry of the Interior (Le Monde)	12 Jun 2022	–	1.17% (1.19%)	25.66% (26.16%)				3.70% (3.30%)	2.67% (–)		25.75% (25.80%)	1.25% (1.30%)	11.29% (11.30%)	2.33% (1.92%)	1.13% (1.21%)	18.68% (18.68%)	4.24% (4.25%)	1.28% (1.09%)	0.85% (3.80%)
Ipsos-Sopra Steria	12 Jun 2022	Projections	1.3%	25.6%				3.7%	2.7%		25.2%	1.3%	13.6%		1.1%	19.1%	4.1%	2.3%	
Elabe BFMTV	12 Jun 2022	Projections	1.2%	26.2%				3.3%	–	–	25.8%	–	11.1%	1.9%	1.2%	19.1%	4.3%	5.9%	
Ifop-Fiducial	12 Jun 2022	Projections	1.4%	26.1%				3%	–	–	25.6%	–	11.3%	3.2%	1.1%	19.2%	4.1%	5%	
Harris-Interactive	12 Jun 2022	Projections	1.5%	25%				5.5%		–	25%	1%	11.5%	2.5%	1.2%	19%	4.5%	3.3%	
Ipsos-Sopra Steria	10 Jun 2022	8,159	1%	27%				3%	2.5%	–	28%	0.5%	11%		1%	19%	5.5%	1.5%	
Harris-Interactive	8–10 Jun 2022	2,078	1%	26%				4%	–	2%	26%	1%	10%	1%	2%	20%	6%	1%	
Ifop-Fiducial	8–9 Jun 2022	1,831	1%	26.5%				3.5%	–	–	26%		10%	2%	1.5%	19%	5.5%	–	5%
Elabe	8–9 Jun 2022	2,000	1.5%	26.5%				3%	–	–	27%		11%	1%	1.5%	19.5%	4.5%	4.5%	
Cluster17	7–9 Jun 2022	2,608	0.5%	29.5%				2.5%	–	1.5%	26%	1%	10.5%	1%	1.5%	17.5%	5.5%	1%	2%
OpinionWay-Kéa	5–8 Jun 2022	3,001	1%	25%				3%	1%	2%	28%		11%	1%	1%	18%	6%	–	3%
YouGov	1–8 Jun 2022	3,306	2%	25%				–	–	1%	26%	-	9%	-	1%	21%	8%	7%	
Ipsos-Sopra Steria	6–7 Jun 2022	2,000	1.5%	28%				2.5%	2.5%	–	27%	0.5%	11%		1%	19.5%	6%	1%	
Ipsos-Sopra Steria	3–6 Jun 2022	10,826	1%	27.5%				2%	2.5%	–	28%	0.5%	11%		1%	20%	5.5%	1%	
Ifop-Fiducial	3–6 Jun 2022	1,840	1%	26%				3.5%	–	–	25%		11%	2%	2%	21%	5%	–	4.5%
Harris-Interactive	3–6 Jun 2022	2,355	2%	24%				5%	–	2%	26%	1%	10%	1%	2%	20%	6%	1%	
Cluster17	30 May–1 Jun 2022	2,459	1%	31%				–	–	1.5%	27%		10%		2%	19%	5%	1.5%	3%
Elabe	30 May–1 Jun 2022	2,000	1.5%	25%				2.5%	–	–	24.5%		12.5%	1.5%	1.5%	22%	4.5%	4.5%	
OpinionWay-Kéa	28–31 May 2022	3,008	1%	26%				2%	2%	1%	27%		11%	1%	1%	20%	6%	–	2%
Harris-Interactive	27–30 May 2022	2,371	2%	24%				4%	–	2%	27%	1%	9%	1%	1%	21%	7%	1%	
Ifop-Fiducial	25–28 May 2022	1,796	1%	25%				4%	–	–	27%		10%	1%	2%	21%	6%	3%	
Cluster17	24–26 May 2022	2,373	0.5%	30%					–	2%	26%		10.5%		1.5%	19%	6%	0.5%	4%
OpinionWay-Kéa	19–24 May 2022	2,845	2%	25%				3%	2%	2%	26%		11%		3%	21%	5%	–	–
Harris-Interactive	20–23 May 2022	2,331	3%	28%				–	–	–	26%		9%		2%	21%	7%	4%	
Cluster17	17–19 May 2022	2,950	0.5%	31%					–	1%	26%		9%		2%	20%	5.5%	1.5%	3.5%
Ipsos-Sopra Steria	16–19 May 2022	11,247	1%	27%				3%	–	–	28%		9%	1%	1%	21%	6%	3%	
Elabe	16–18 May 2022	1,793	2%	27.5%				–	–	–	27%		10%		1%	21.5%	5%	6%	
OpinionWay-Kéa	14–18 May 2022	3,022	2%	24%				3%	2%	2%	27%		11%		2%	22%	5%	–	–
Ifop-Fiducial	13–16 May 2022	1,884	1.5%	27%				–	–	–	26%		11%		2.5%	23%	6%	–	3%
Harris-Interactive	13–16 May 2022	2,393	3%	29%				–	–	–	26%		10%		1%	23%	5%	3%	
Cluster17	10–12 May 2022	2,967	1%	31%					–	–	27%		9.5%		2%	19%	5.5%	1%	4%
Ifop-Fiducial	6–9 May 2022	1,691	1.5%	28%				–	–	–	27%		11%		2%	22%	6.5%	–	2%
Ifop-Fiducial	6–9 May 2022	1,691	1%	2%	18%	6.5%	5.5%	–	–	–	26%		11%		2%	21%	6%	–	2%
Harris-Interactive	6–9 May 2022	2,406	3%	28%				–	–	–	26%		9%		1%	24%	6%	3%	
OpinionWay-Kéa	5–9 May 2022	3,077	2%	23%				3%	2%	2%	26%		12%		2%	23%	5%	–	–
Cluster17	3–5 May 2022	3,498	1%	34%					–	–	24.5%		8.5%		1.5%	19.5%	5%	2%	4%
Harris-Interactive	29 Apr–2 May 2022	2,366	2%	2%	19%	7%	7%		–	–	24%		8%		1%	23%	6%	1%	
Harris-Interactive	29 Apr–2 May 2022	2,366	2%	33%				–	–	–	33%				30%			2%	
Cluster17	27–28 Apr 2022	2,659	1%	2%	20%	7.5%	5.5%		–	–	24%		7.5%		2%	21%	6%	1%	2.5%
Cluster17	27–28 Apr 2022	2,659	1.5%	27%			7%		–	–	23%		9%		2%	21%	6.5%	1%	2%
Cluster17	27–28 Apr 2022	2,659	1%	34%					–	–	24%		9.5%		3%	24%		1.5%	3%
Harris-Interactive	24–25 Apr 2022	2,343	1%	3%	19%	8%	5%		–	–	24%		8%		1%	23%	7%	1%	
Harris-Interactive	24–25 Apr 2022	2,343	2%	33%				–	–	–	33%				31%			1%	
2017 election results	11 Jun 2017	–	0.8%	2.7%	11%	(ECO)	9.5%	1.6%	4.3%	0.3%	32.3%		18.8%	2.7%	1.2%	13.2%	0.3%	0.9%	1.9%

== Second round ==
=== Seat projections ===
Polling firm	Fieldwork date	Sample size	NUPES				DVG	ENS	DVC	UDC	DVD	DLF LP	RN	REC	EXD	REG	DIV
Polling firm	Fieldwork date	Sample size	PCF	LFI	PÉ	PS	DVG	ENS	DVC	UDC	DVD	DLF LP	RN	REC	EXD	REG	DIV
Ministry of the Interior (Le Monde)	19 Jun 2022	–	131 (142)				22 (13)	245 (246)	4 (5)	64 (64)	10 (9)	1 (1)	89 (89)	0 (0)	0 (1)	10 (6)	1 (1)
Ifop-Fiducial	16–17 Jun 2022	1,399	160–190				5–10	270–300	–	50–70	6–8	–	25–45	–	–	5–9	
Cluster17	16–17 Jun 2022	n/a	170–220				7–10	230–290	3–5	65–75	3–5	–	40–60	–	–	4–7	
Ipsos-Sopra Steria	15–16 Jun 2022	1,991	140–180				12–24	265–305	2–4	60–80	–	–	20–50	–	–	5–10	
Elabe	15–16 Jun 2022	1,801	150–200				8–12	255–295	3–5	55–75	2–4	–	30–50	–	1–2 (Note: DLF, LP, and EXD are included together.)	5–9	
OpinionWay-Kéa	14–16 Jun 2022	1,028	165–210				–	275–305	–	60–75	–	–	20–40	–	–	7–13	
Odoxa	14–15 Jun 2022	1,881	179–225				3–7	252–292	–	42–62	2–8	–	25–49 (Note: EXD is included.)	–	–	2–6	
Ifop-Fiducial	14–15 Jun 2022	1,508	180–210				3–7	265–300	–	40–65	2–6	–	20–40	–	–	3–7	
Harris-Interactive	12 Jun 2022	6,492	14–21	97–117	25–41	25–40	2–8	257–297	0–1	45–65	3–8	0–1	23–45	–	–	5–10	
Harris-Interactive	12 Jun 2022	6,492	161–219				2–8	257–297	0–1	45–65	3–8	0–1	23–45	–	–	5–10	
Ipsos-Sopra Steria	12 Jun 2022	Exit poll	10–16	96–115	20–30	24–29	15–25	255–295	–	50–80		–	20–45	–	–	10–17	
Ipsos-Sopra Steria	12 Jun 2022	Exit poll	150–190				15–25	255–295	–	50–80		–	20–45	–	–	10–17	
Elabe	12 Jun 2022	Exit poll	160–210				7–13	260–295	–	50–65	2–5	–	25–35	–	0–2 (Note: DLF, LP, and EXD are included together.)	9–14	
Ipsos-Sopra Steria	10 Jun 2022	8,159	155–190				18–30	275–315	–	35–55		–	20–45	–	–	5–10	
Harris-Interactive	8–10 Jun 2022	2,078	11–18	90–110	22–37	22–38	4–12	265–305	0–2	38–58	3–8	0–1	25–48	0–3	0–1	5–10	
Harris-Interactive	8–10 Jun 2022	2,078	145–203				4–12	265–305	0–2	38–58	3–8	0–1	25–48	0–3	0–1	5–10	
Ifop-Fiducial	8–9 Jun 2022	1,831	180–210				8–12	270–305	–	40–55	–	–	15–35	0–2	–	8–14	
Elabe	8–9 Jun 2022	2,000	165–190				–	280–320	–	40–60	–	–	25–50	–	–	10–15	
OpinionWay-Kéa	5–8 Jun 2022	3,001	160–190				–	290–330	–	50–70	–	–	13–33	0–2	–	6–11	
Ipsos-Sopra Steria	6–7 Jun 2022	2,000	175–215				10–18	260–300	–	35–55		–	20–50	–	–	5-10	
Ipsos-Sopra Steria	3–6 Jun 2022	10,826	160–200				8–18	275–315	–	30–55		–	20–55	–	–	8–18	
Ifop-Fiducial	3–6 Jun 2022	2,000	195–230				4–8	250–290	–	40–55	–	–	20–45	0–2	–	6–12	
Harris-Interactive	3–6 Jun 2022	2,355	9–16	71–97	20–35	20–36	–	285–335	0–2	38–58	3–8	0–1	30–50	0–3	0–1	3–7	
Harris-Interactive	3–6 Jun 2022	2,355	120–184				–	285–335	0–2	38–58	3–8	0–1	30–50	0–3	0–1	3–7	
Elabe	30 May–1 Jun 2022	2,000	155–180				–	275–315	–	40–65	–	–	35–65	–	–	10–15	
OpinionWay-Kéa	28–31 May 2022	3,008	160–190				–	290–330	–	50–70	–	–	13–33	0–2	–	6–11	
Harris-Interactive	27–30 May 2022	2,371	8–15	54–80	18–33	16–32	0–6	300–350	0–1	35–55	3–8	0–1	35–55	0–3	0–1	3–7	
Harris-Interactive	27–30 May 2022	2,371	96–160				0–6	300–350	0–1	35–55	3–8	0–1	35–55	0–3	0–1	3–7	
Ifop-Fiducial	25–28 May 2022	1,796	170–205				5–10	275–310	–	35–55	–	–	20–50	1–4	–	8–15	
OpinionWay-Kéa	19–24 May 2022	2,845	155–185				–	295–335	–	50–70	–	–	14–34	–	–	6–11	
Harris-Interactive	20–23 May 2022	2,331	9–16	60–86	20–35	18–34	–	295–345	–	32–52	–	0–1	42–68	0–3	–	3–7	
Harris-Interactive	20–23 May 2022	2,331	107–171				–	295–345	–	32–52	–	0–1	42–68	0–3	–	3–7	
Ipsos-Sopra Steria	16–19 May 2022	11,247	165–195				–	290–330	–	35–65	–	–	20–45	–	–	5–10	
Elabe	16–18 May 2022	1,793	160–185				–	290–330	–	25–50	–	–	35–65	–	–	5–15	
OpinionWay-Kéa	14–18 May 2022	3,022	140–170				–	310–350	–	50–70	–	–	15–35	–	–	5–10	
Harris-Interactive	13–16 May 2022	2,393	8–15	62–88	20–35	18–34	–	300–350	–	35–55	–	0–1	48–75	0–2	–	3–7	
Harris-Interactive	13–16 May 2022	2,393	108–172				–	300–350	–	35–55	–	0–1	48–75	0–2	–	3–7	
Harris-Interactive	6–9 May 2022	2,406	8–15	60–85	20–35	17–33	–	300–350	–	30–48	–	0–1	52–80	0–2	–	3–7	
Harris-Interactive	6–9 May 2022	2,406	105–168				–	300–350	–	30–48	–	0–1	52–80	0–2	–	3–7	
OpinionWay-Kéa	5–9 May 2022	3,077	135–165				–	310–350	–	50–70	–	–	20–40	–	–	5–10	
Harris-Interactive	29 Apr–2 May 2022	2,366	5–10	25–45	1–5	20–40	–	338–378	–	35–65	–	–	65–95	–	–	3–7	
Harris-Interactive	29 Apr–2 May 2022	2,366	70–90				–	336–376				110–140			–	3–7	
Harris-Interactive	24–25 Apr 2022	2,343	5–10	25–45	1–5	20–40	–	328–368	–	35–65	–	–	75–105	–	–	3–7	
Harris-Interactive	24–25 Apr 2022	2,343	73–93				–	326–366				117–147			–	3–7	
2017 election	18 Jun 2017	–	10	17	1	30	11	350	–	130	6	1	8	–	1	5	3

== See also ==
- Opinion polling for the 2017 French legislative election
- Opinion polling for the 2019 European Parliament election in France
- Opinion polling for the 2022 French presidential election
- Opinion polling on the Emmanuel Macron presidency
