= Jérôme Cahuzac =

French politician

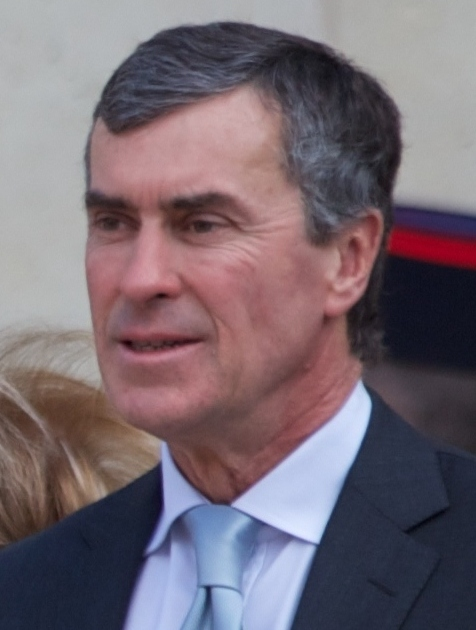

Minister of the Budget
- In office 16 May 2012 – 19 March 2013
- Prime Minister: Jean-Marc Ayrault
- Preceded by: Valérie Pécresse
- Succeeded by: Bernard Cazeneuve

Member of the National Assembly for Lot-et-Garonne's 3rd constituency
- In office 20 June 2007 – 21 July 2012
- Preceded by: Alain Merly
- Succeeded by: Jean-Claude Gouget
- In office 12 June 1997 – 18 June 2002
- Preceded by: Daniel Soulage
- Succeeded by: Alain Merly

Mayor of Villeneuve-sur-Lot
- In office 23 March 2001 – 28 June 2012
- Preceded by: Michel Gonelle
- Succeeded by: Patrick Cassany

Personal details
- Born: Jérôme André Cahuzac; 19 June 1952 (age 73) Talence, France
- Party: Socialist Party (1977–2013)
- Occupation: Surgeon

Jérôme André Cahuzac (French pronunciation: [ʒeʁom ɑ̃dʁe kaʔyzak]; born 19 June 1952) is a French surgeon and former politician who served as Minister of the Budget at the Ministry of the Economy and Finance under President François Hollande from 2012 to 2013. A former member of the Socialist Party (PS), he previously was the member of the National Assembly for the 3rd constituency of Lot-et-Garonne from 1997 to 2002 and again from 2007 to 2012. He resigned from his ministership and was expelled from his party amidst the Cahuzac affair, in which he was accused and subsequently convicted of tax fraud.

== Early political career ==
A native of Talence, a suburb of Bordeaux, Cahuzac was elected as the member of the National Assembly for the 3rd constituency of Lot-et-Garonne in the 1997 legislative election, but lost his 2002 reelection bid to UMP candidate Alain Merly. He stood again for the seat in 2007 and defeated UMP candidate and former celebrity prosecutor Jean-Louis Bruguière. He was reelected in 2012.

Following the 2001 municipal election, Cahuzac took office as Mayor of Villeneuve-sur-Lot, a position he resigned upon his appointment as a government minister.

In the Socialist Party's 2011 primaries, Cahuzac endorsed François Hollande as the party's candidate for the 2012 presidential election.

== Cahuzac affair ==
On 16 May 2012, Cahuzac was appointed as Minister Delegate for the Budget at the Ministry of the Economy, Finance and External Trade (renamed Ministry of the Economy and Finance on 18 June 2012) in the government of Prime Minister Jean-Marc Ayrault.

He resigned as the minister in charge of fighting against tax fraud on 19 March 2013 due to tax fraud allegations but maintained he was innocent. On 2 April 2013 he admitted on his blog that he had held a secret foreign bank account for about 20 years. As a consequence, he was officially excluded as a member of the Socialist Party on 9 April 2013.

On 3 April 2016, the Panama Papers leak confirmed former allegations adding details, that Cahuzac owned a Seychelles company named Cerman Group Limited, incorporated in 2009, whose director and shareholder were from other offshore companies. When French authorities were investigating allegations of tax fraud in 2013, and Seychelles authorities questioned Mossack Fonseca, the intermediate representing the undisclosed owner, they learned that Cahuzac was the owner. Mossack Fonseca told Seychelles authorities in 3 May 2013, that they severed ties, as Cahuzac was a high risk politically exposed person; Cerman Group Limited was dissolved in January 2015.

Cahuzac was sentenced to three years in prison and five years of ineligibility on 8 December 2016. He appealed on points of law. In May 2018, the Court of Appeal of Paris gave him four years of prison (two suspended).
