= Olivier Damaisin =

French politician

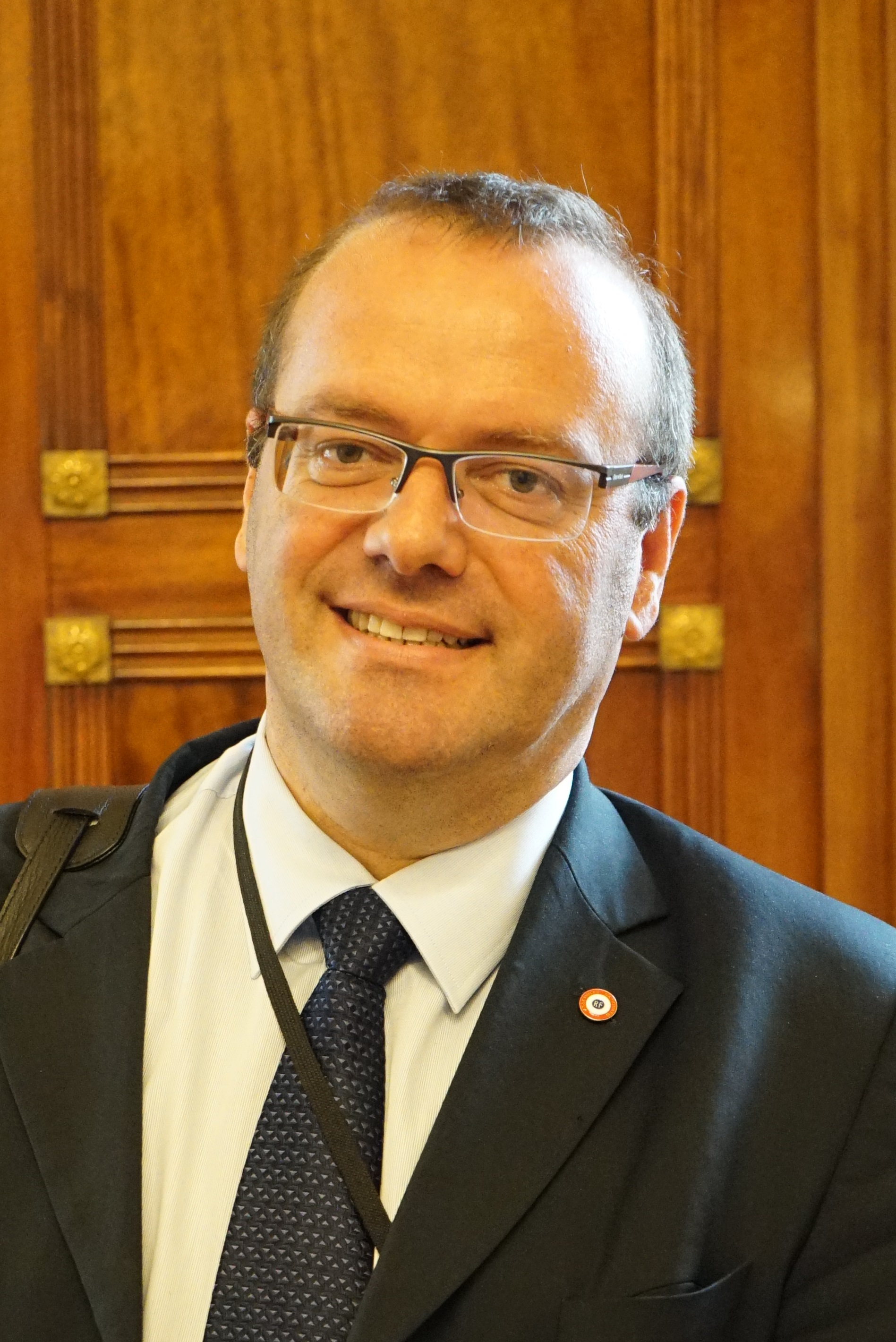

Member of the National Assembly for Lot-et-Garonne's 3rd constituency
- In office 21 June 2017 – June 2022
- Preceded by: Jean-Louis Costes

Personal details
- Born: 5 August 1966 (age 59) Romans-sur-Isère, France
- Party: La République En Marche!

Olivier Damaisin (born 5 August 1966) is a French politician of La République En Marche! (LREM) who served as a member of the French National Assembly from 2017 to 2022, representing the department of Lot-et-Garonne.

In parliament, Damaisin served on the Finance Committee. In addition to his committee assignments, he was part of the French-Jamaican Parliamentary Friendship Group and the French-Gabonese Parliamentary Friendship Group.

Damaisin lost his seat in the first round of the 2022 French legislative election.

== See also ==
- 2017 French legislative election
