= Arsène Lambert =

French general (1834–1901)

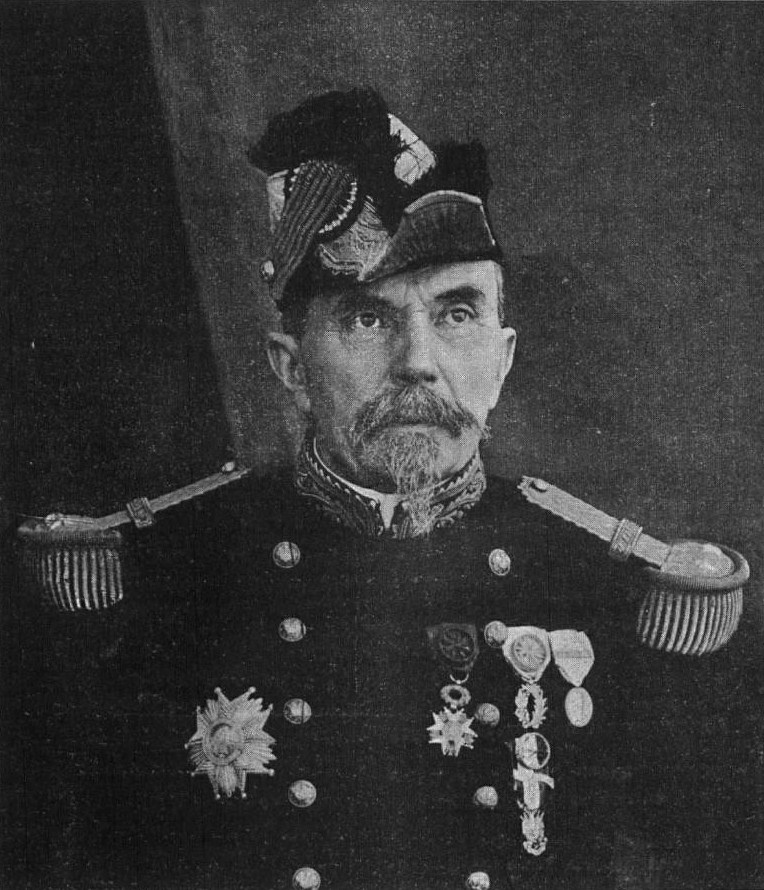
- "Le général Lambert, héros de Bazeilles, sénateur" Henri Moreau, 1900
- Born: Arsène Mathurin Louis Marie Lambert; 23 June 1834; Carhaix (Finistère, France
- Died: 11 January 1901; Paris, France
- Education: Saint Cyr
- Occupations: Brigadier general Senator
- Spouse: Isabelle Eugénie Joséphine Delisle
- Parent(s): Jean François Hervé Lambert; Joséphine Maillet

Arsène Lambert (French pronunciation: [aʁsɛn lɑ̃bɛʁ]; 23 June 1834 – 11 January 1901) was a senior French general who achieved particular distinction in the French conquest of Senegal and, later, in the Franco-Prussian War of 1870.

In January 1900 he was elected to the French senate, representing the Finistère département. His senatorial career was brief, however, since he died slightly less than a year later.

== Biography ==
=== Personal ===
Arsène Mathurin Louis Marie Lambert was born at four in the morning in Carhaix (Finistère) in the far north-west of France. He was baptised in the town at the church of Saint Trémeur the next day. His mother, born Joséphine Maillet, is identified as the owner of a piece of land at Saint-Joseph on the island département of Réunion, east of Madagascar in the Indian Ocean. His father, Jean François Hervé Lambert, served as an army officer, and it was presumably as a result of the engineering skills he acquired in the army that he was subsequently appointed to a position as "conducteur des Ponts et Chaussées", involved in bridge and road construction and maintenance.

Arsène Lambert also decided on a military career at a relatively young age. There was nevertheless another side to him. He was deeply interested in the arts and literature. He displayed talents as an artist and sculptor. In his later years he also wrote histories of the wars in which he had participated.

He married, on 11 May 1870, Isabelle Eugénie Joséphine Delisle, a French woman of Cuban provenance.

=== Professional ===
==== "Scramble for Africa" ====
Lambert graduated from the Saint Cyr military academy, then at Yvelines near Paris, in 1856 and enlisted with the "Infanterie de marine" (loosely, "Marines"). The regiment was at that time engaged in the conquest of Senegal where he arrived in February 1858 and where it is reported that he distinguished himself. He was still only twenty-five when he was awarded his first medal. Between February and June he was mandated to "take control" of the hilly Fouta Djallon region in land from what was becoming the French colony of Rivières du Sud (subsequently French Guinea). He was promoted to the rank of Captain in 1862.

There followed a six year posting to Réunion between 19 May 1863 and 28 August 1869, where he was stationed at Saint-Denis as a captain of the marines ("capitaine d'infanterie de marine". He was involved in containing the riots that erupted at Saint-Denis in 1868. In 1869 he was promoted again, becoming a battalion commander. Almost immediately after that he became deputy chief of staff, assigned to General Élie de Vassoigne, with the 12th infantry regiment.

==== Franco-Prussian War ====
Back in Europe, responding to a characteristically devious provocation from Chancellor Bismarck, the French parliament voted to declare war against Prussia on 19 July 1870. Lambert's unit found itself close to Sedan where the French commander Marshal de MacMahon had decided to concentrate military resources in order to block an anticipated Prussian military advance through Belgium. By this time Lambert was serving with the 2nd Marine Infantry Regiment ("2e Régiment d'Infanterie de Marine") which formed part of the so-called Blue Division which in a series of savage engagements during the wider Battle of Sedan captured and then recaptured Bazeilles from I Royal Bavarian Corps under the command of General von der Thann.

With a handful of men Lambert was given the task of organising the defence of the Rougerie Inn which had become a key focus of the fighting and which later became a little museum known as the House of the Last Cartridge ("Maison de la dernière cartouche"). The little force put up an obstinate resistance lasting several hours. Captain Arsène Lambert homself had the honour of firing the final cartridge before the defenders were forced to surrender. The Bavarian commander was so impressed by the courage shown by the defenders that he spared their lives, despite allowing a massacre by his troops of the local population whose support for the French forces enraged the German forces. Lambert was taken prisoner but managed to escape.

He managed to escape and reconnect with the French army. He was with the army that on 21 May 1871 entered Paris and regained control from the revolutionary communards who had taken over the city, in the chaos following the four month Prussian army siege, on 18 March 1871. Arsène Lambert succeeded in taking control of several strategically important locations including the Ministry of Foreign Affairs building, the parliament building ("Corps législatif (Second Empire)") and the Gare d'Orléans, which was the Paris rail terminus for trains to Tours. (The provisional French government had decamped to Tours in September/October 1870 during the first part of the Siege of Paris. In recognition of his contributions he was appointed an officer of the Legion of Honour, the award being announced on 10 June 1871. The award ceremony took place on 14 September 1871: the honour was physically handed over by his former military commander, General Élie de Vassoigne who had already, in May of the previous year, attended and signed off at Lambert's marriage as a witness.

==== Third republic ====
Despite the immediate recognition of Arsène Lambert's heroic contributions during the Franco-Prussian War and the rapid termination of the commune experiment, the French Third Republic was born out of military defeat. For the military establishment that was little to celebrate, which may explain why within the army further promotion came slowly for Arsène Lambert. He was made a full colonel only in 1885.

Five years later, and having become known as a committed supporter of the Republican establishment despite having spent the first part of his career serving the Empire, he became a Brigadier general (général de brigade) at the end of 1888 (or, according to some sources, during 1890) and, in around 1890, "commandant militaire du Sénat".

By 1892 (when he was a witness at a marriage) he was giving his domicile as Quimper, where he was given charge of an infantry brigade ("130e régiment d’infanterie de ligne"). Despite a developing arms race among the principal military powers of Europe and continuing colonising activity, both in Africa and further afield, on the home front the 1890s was essentially a decade of peace, coupled with social and economic progress. In 1896, by now aged 62, Arsène Lambert was released from active military service. Within the Legion of Honour his retirement was marked, on 22 June 1896, by a promotion to the rank of "Grand Officier". He was elected to the presidency of two veterans associations, the "Société nationale des vétérans de terre et de mer" and the "Union des sociétés régimentaires".

On 28 January 1900 Arsène Lambert was elected to the senate in succession to Corentin Halléguen, the previous senator for Finistère, who had died the previous year. He sat with the democratic left ("Gauche démocratique" group in the chamber. Slightly counter-intuitively, he nevertheless took a full part in discussions concerning the organisation of troops in the colonies, insisting that colonial defence was something that should be left to the Ministry for War. His enduring concern with matters military were also evident in a question he addressed to the newly installed minister for war concerning celebrations to mark the centenary of the death of Théophile Corret de la Tour d'Auvergne, a favourite soldier of Emperor Napoléon I.

Arsène Lambert died on 11 January 1901.
