= Annick Cousin =

French politician (born 1973)

Member of the National Assembly for Lot-et-Garonne's 3rd constituency
- Incumbent
- Assumed office 22 June 2022
- Preceded by: Olivier Damaisin

Member of the Regional Council of Nouvelle-Aquitaine
- Incumbent
- Assumed office 2 July 2021

Personal details
- Born: 7 August 1973 (age 52) Agen, France
- Party: National Rally
- Occupation: Politician

Annick Cousin (born 7 August 1973) is a French politician of the National Rally (RN) who was elected as the deputy to the National Assembly for the 3rd constituency of the Lot-et-Garonne department in 2022.

== Biography ==
Cousin was born and raised in Agen. She was an employee of the district hospital of Agen prior to entering politics. In 2021, she was elected as a regional councillor of Nouvelle-Aquitaine. She succeeded Hélène Laporte as the departmental National Rally leader in Lot-et-Garonne that same year.

In 2015 and 2021, she unsuccessfully ran for a seat in the Departmental Council of Lot-et-Garonne in the canton of Le Pays de Serres, failing to reach both elections' second round. In the 2022 legislative election however, Cousin was elected to represent the 3rd constituency of Lot-et-Garonne in the National Assembly, succeeding Olivier Damaisin of La République En Marche! who ran under the Ensemble alliance but failed to qualify for the second round. Cousin defeated Xavier Czapla of La France Insoumise (part of the New Ecological and Social People's Union alliance) with 56.9% of the vote.
