= Cahuzac affair =

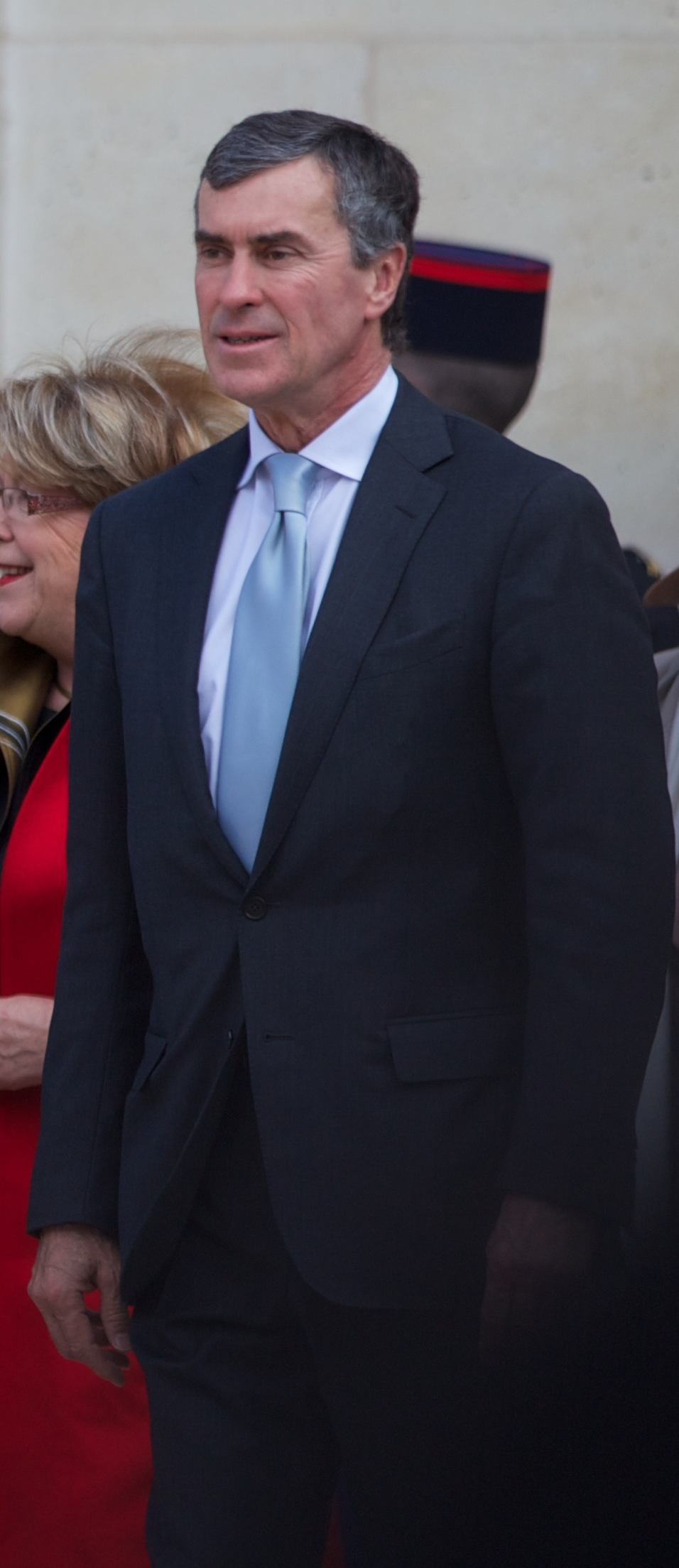
Jérôme Cahuzac at the French Presidential Inauguration. 15 May 2012.

On 19 March 2013 Jérôme Cahuzac resigned as a minister in charge of fighting against tax fraud due to tax fraud allegations. He later admitted that he had held a secret foreign bank account for about 20 years. As a consequence, he was officially excluded as a member of the Socialist Party. The release of the Panama Papers confirmed that Cahuzac owned a Seychelles company named Cerman Group Limited, incorporated in 2009, whose director and shareholder were from other offshore companies. Jérôme Cahuzac was sentenced to three years in prison and five years of disqualification on 8 December 2016.

== Background ==
The 2008 financial crisis is considered by many to be the worst financial crisis since the Wall Street crash of 1929. It left France and the rest of Europe exhausted and indebted. Nicolas Sarkozy was then President of France, from 2007 to 2012. Following his five-year tenure, he lost the second round of the 2012 presidential election against Francois Hollande.

In 2010, Jérôme Cahuzac was elected President of the Finance, General Economy and Budgetary Control Committees of the National Assembly. Two years later, in 2012, he joined François Hollande's presidential campaign team. He was given the task to handle the budgetary, financial and fiscal aspects of the campaign. After Mr. Hollande's success and election as France's president, Cahuzac was appointed Delegated Minister of Budget on 16 May 2012.

Cahuzac is a physician whose political career began in 1997 when he was elected to be a deputy of the National Assembly. The National Assembly is one of the two major political bodies in France. Currently, 577 deputies make up the National Assembly. Along with the Senate, it forms the parliament of the Fifth French Republic. Going from general counsel of the Department of "Lot-et-Garonne" to mayor, and back to deputy, Mr. Cahuzac made a solid name and reputation for himself, while, by 2016, when the scandal was leaked, voters had grown distrustful of politicians.

== Key events ==
The Cahuzac affair's main aspects are the genesis and evolution of the financial crimes, the downfall of participants, and the reason for the scandal's unveiling.

This scandal was originally revealed with the publishing of a "secret recording" by Mediapart. The recording originally took place towards the end of the year 2000, but was only revealed at the beginning of March 2013. It contained the voices of two individuals, Cahuzac and his wealth manager . Both were discussing a variety of financial and private matters. Among these matters, was that of his bank account with UBS. Mr. Cahuzac explained to his associate that his account with that bank was bothering him because he had no more use for it. It was later found that he had transferred all the funds present in that bank account to another one overseas. Here is a short part of the (French) scripted recording that accurately depicts the previously referred to situation:

"Ca me fait chier d’avoir un compte ouvert là-bas, l’UBS c’est quand même pas forcément la plus planquée des banques."

In English, this translates to:

"The fact of having a bank account open there truly bothers me, UBS isn’t necessarily the most hidden of banks."

Cahuzac never categorically denied the authenticity of the recording. He is known to have said that out of all these minutes of conversation, there may have been a few seconds where it was indeed him speaking. Following the amount of press coverage, proof and criticism stemming from the recording's leakage, President Hollande had no other choice but to release him from his duties as Minister of Budget on 19 March 2013. Mr. Cahuzac was accused of money laundering and fiscal fraud. He later admitted to having transferred 600,000 euros to a bank account in Singapore. Subsequently, he was condemned to three years in prison along with a 375,000 euro fine. The judges on the case deemed this sentence necessary because of the "traitorous" nature of his acts and words – "especially when put in contrast with his job responsibilities and requirements" said one of the judges. He can however decide to appeal the decision reached by the Justice officials. Conjointly, his ex-wife Patricia Cahuzac is standing trial next to him for "family fiscal fraud." Having, in addition to the things previously stated, participated in the creation of various shell companies, she was consequently condemned to two years of prison.

The reasons for the unraveling of this affair are numerous. The main reason stems from reporters, who saw huge potential in possible findings resulting from the thorough investigation of the bank accounts of France's newly appointed Minister of Budget – who just so happened to previously be a plastic surgeon. Mr. Cahuzac was at the centre of the stage for quite some time.

Two other players that had a crucial role in the development of this affair were the French military along with the armament industry. Mr. Cahuzac was planning on implementing huge budget cuts for the country's Defense budget. Reports indicate that he was planning on bringing it down from 32 to 20 billion euros annually. By doing so, he would encourage the removal of dozens of ground military-units, the cancellation of on-going military contracts for aircraft and helicopters, as well as the rumored removal of France's one and only aircraft carrier, the "Charles de Gaulle." In an article published by Atlantico, it is explained that the French secret services, along with multiple members of the Defense Committee, were in fact the key players in this story. It was revealed that they had worked together to gather information on his Swiss UBS bank account and tracked the money-trail that led to Singapore. Once it was done, they leaked their discoveries to the press and just waited for the whole affair to "blow-up."

== Political impacts and reforms ==
The Cahuzac affair was impactful, and reforms ensued. The scandal weakened President Hollande's stature, as he was blamed for appointing Cahuzac at the start of his tenure. As a consequence of the movement that followed the Minister's resignation, a huge amount of skepticism and distrust settled in the country. Citizens and reporters started questioning and interrogating various politicians – thinking that some of them were also undoubtedly involved in the same sort of activities. Political figures such as Pierre Moscovici (Minister of Finance and Economy from 2012 to 2014) and Jean-Jacques Augier (active politician and inspector of finances) were put under investigation as a result.

France's president and government subsequently decided to implement new reforms. There were two main reforms announced by President Hollande following this incident. The first one encompasses the idea that elected politicians who have been condemned for fiscal fraud or corruption would be forbidden from any type of public office or mandate. And the second one states that the financial details of each and every single minister and Member of Parliament have to be examined and published. French laws do not sanction the lie of an elected politician in front of the National Assembly. However, to fight perjury as much as possible, a specific law is trying to be put forth and passed by the National Assembly. This law states that a 75,000 euro fine and up to five years of prison was required for any elected politician or Member of Parliament who lies in front of Parliament about a fiscal or criminal matter. These laws and new regulations were put in place after French politicians realized how dissatisfied the French population was. French news outlets LeMonde, LeFigaro and LCI conducted a study that indeed confirmed the preceding statement: 33% of France's citizens wanted President Hollande to dissolve the National Assembly – one of the Fifth French Republic's most important and emblematic pillars.

== Aftermath ==
As a consequence of such scandals, new laws were introduced to fight fiscal fraud, money laundering and perjury in France's parliamentary systems. In 2013, the year following the divulging of Cahuzac's foreign bank accounts, Le Monde and Le Figaro published a study that accurately depicted public opinion as indicating that 77% of French citizens deemed their country's politicians corrupt.
