= Bernard Poignant =

French politician and Member of the European Parliament (born 1945)

Bernard Poignant (born 19 September 1945 in Vannes, Morbihan, Brittany) is a French politician and Member of the European Parliament for the west of France. He is a member of the Socialist Party, which is part of the Party of European Socialists, and sits on the European Parliament's Committee on Fisheries and its Committee on Regional Development.

== Professional career ==
He is a substitute for the Committee on Budgetary Control and a member of the delegation for relations with the countries of Southeast Asia and the Association of Southeast Asian Nations. He is also a substitute for the delegation to the EU–Kazakhstan, EU–Kyrgyzstan and EU–Uzbekistan Parliamentary Cooperation Committees, and for relations with Tajikistan, Turkmenistan and Mongolia.

== Career ==
- Highest postgraduate teaching qualification in history (1970)
- Former Chairman of the National Federation of Socialist and Republican Elected Representatives
- Mayor of Quimper (1989–2001 and 2008-2014)
- Member of the French Parliament (1981–1986 and 1988–1993)
- Member of the European Parliament (1999-2009)
- Knight of the Legion of Honour
