= 2012 French legislative election =

- 10 June 2012 (first round); 17 June 2012 (second round)

All 577 seats in the National Assembly 289 seats needed for a majority
- Turnout: 57.2% (▼3.2 pp) (1st round); 55.4% (▼1.8 pp) 2nd round)
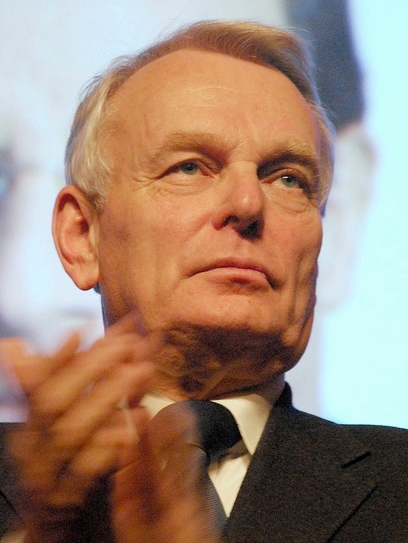

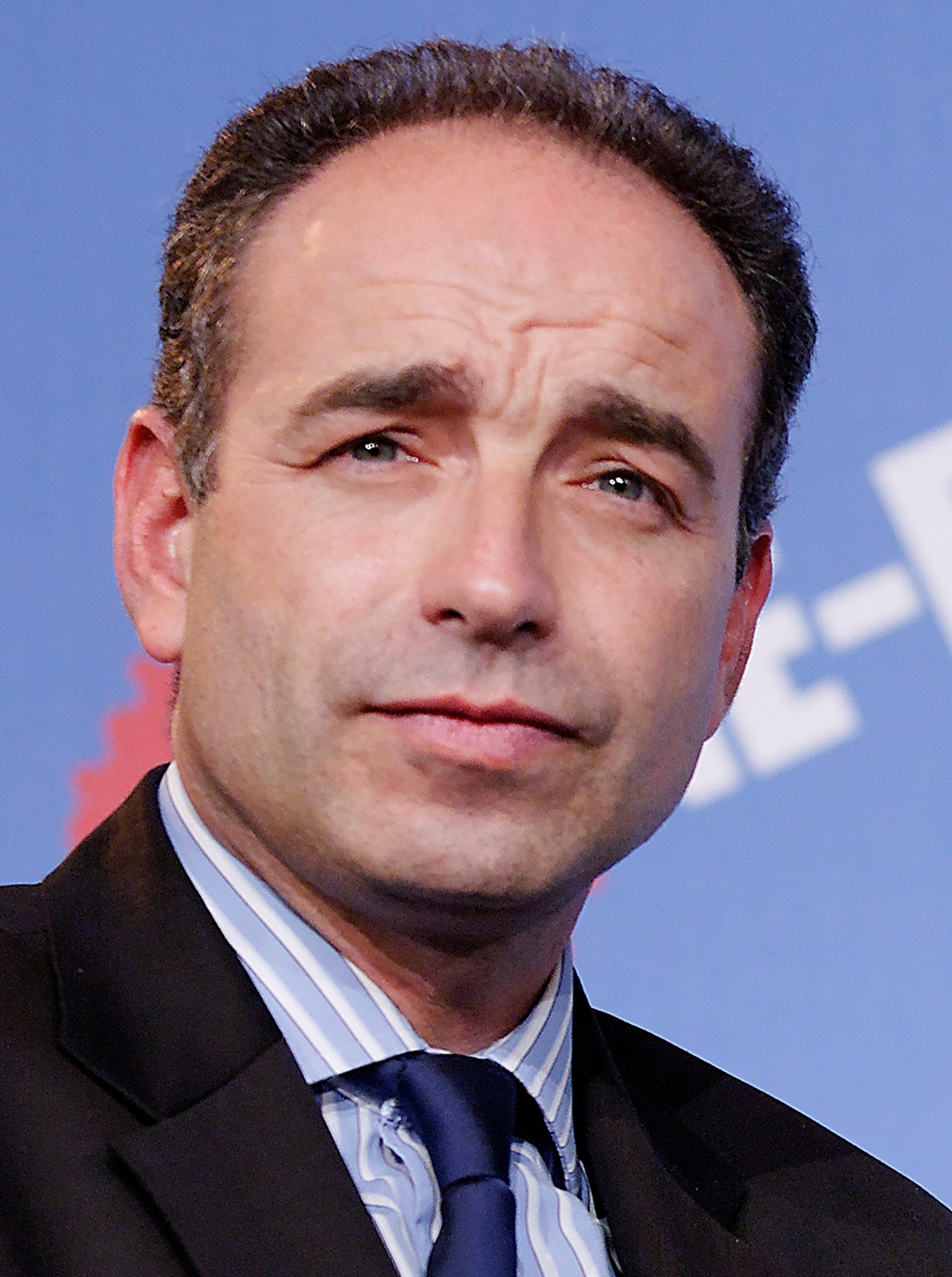

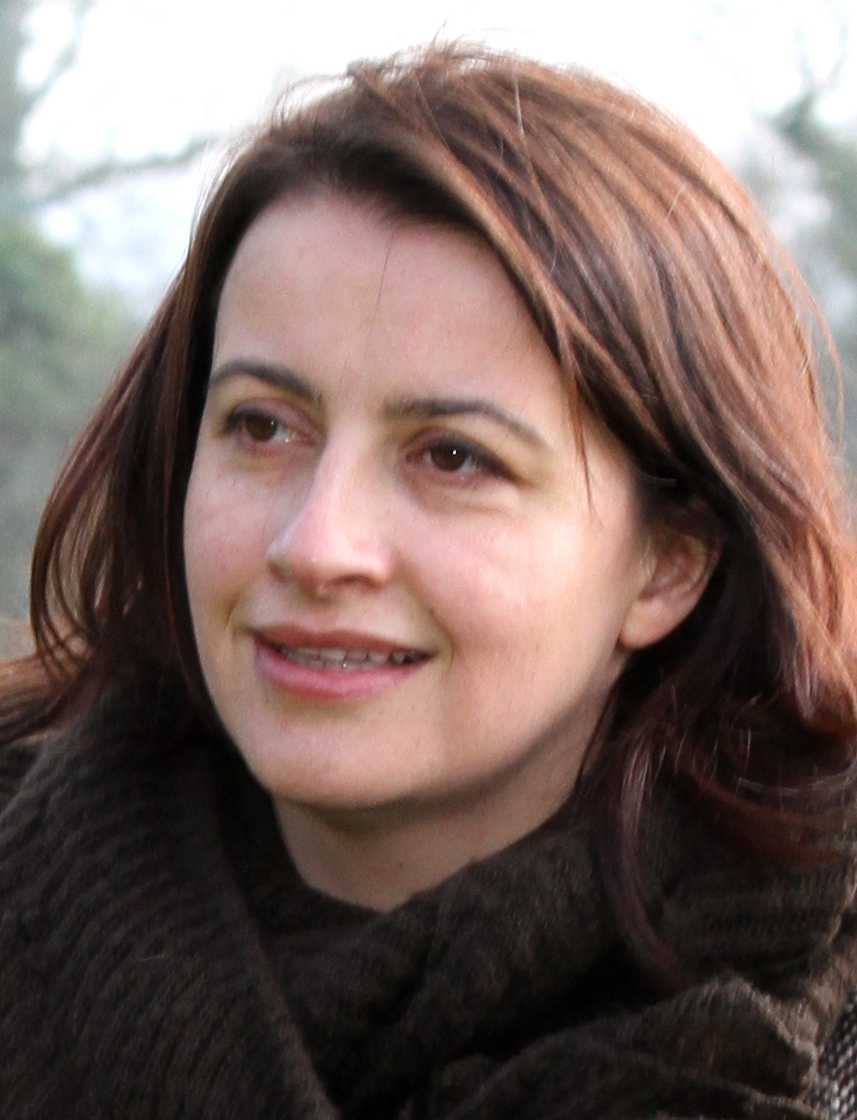

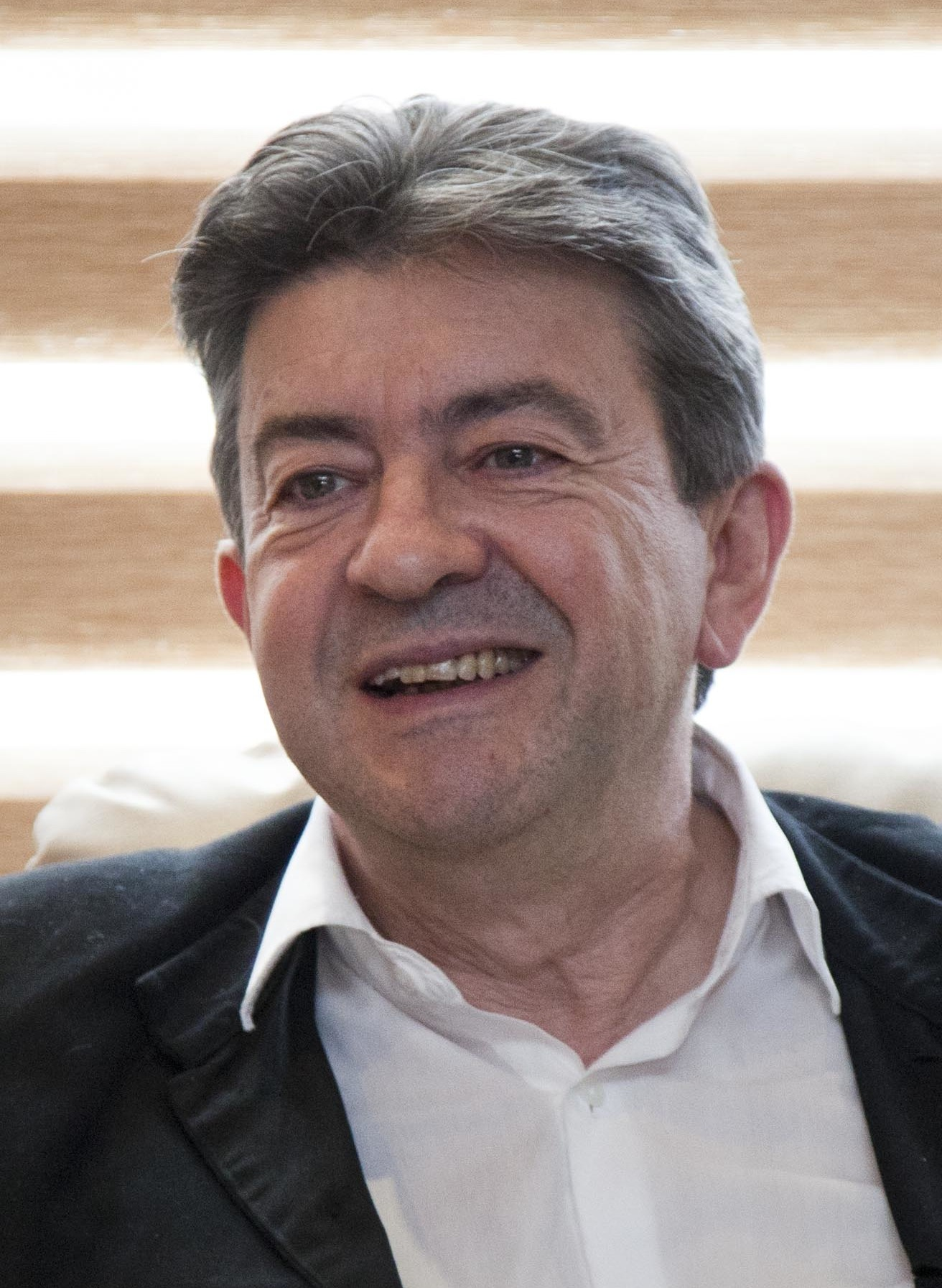

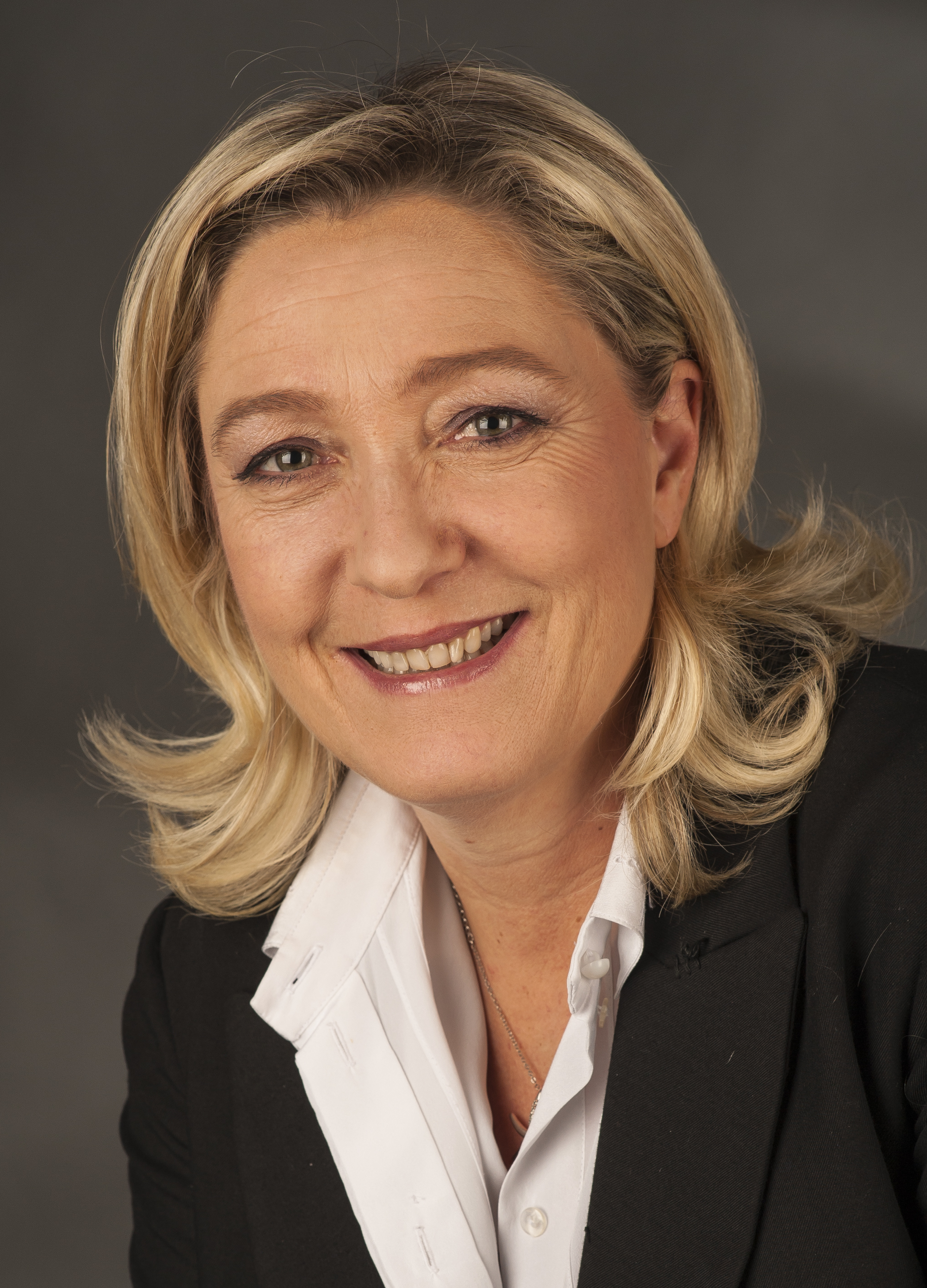
	First party	Second party	Third party
Leader	Jean-Marc Ayrault	Jean-François Copé	Cécile Duflot
Party	PS	UMP	EELV
Leader since	15 May 2012	17 November 2010	16 November 2006
Leader's seat	Loire-Atlantique-3rd	Seine-et-Marne-6th	Paris-6th
Last election	186 seats, 24.7%	313 seats, 39.5%	4 seats, 3.3%
Seats won	280	194	17
Seat change	▲94	▼119	▲13
1st round % and swing	7,618,326; 29.35% ▲4.7%	7,037,268; 27.12% ▼16.3%	1,418,264; 5.46% ▲2.21%
2nd round % and swing	9,420,889; 40.91% ▼1.4%	8,740,628; 37.95% ▼8.4%	829,036; 3.60% ▲3.15%
	Fourth party	Fifth party
Leader	Jean-Luc Mélenchon	Marine Le Pen
Party	FG	FN
Leader since	18 November 2008	16 January 2011
Leader's seat	Ran in Pas-de-Calais's 11th (lost)	Ran in Pas-de-Calais's 11th (lost)
Last election	New alliance	0 seats, 4.3%
Seats won	10	2
Seat change	▼8	▲2
1st round % and swing	1,793,192; 6.91% ▲2.62%	3,528,663; 13.60% ▲9.31%
2nd round % and swing	249,498; 1.08% ▼0.55%	842,695; 3.66% ▲3.58%
Prime Minister before election
Jean-Marc Ayrault
PS
Elected Prime Minister
Jean-Marc Ayrault
PS

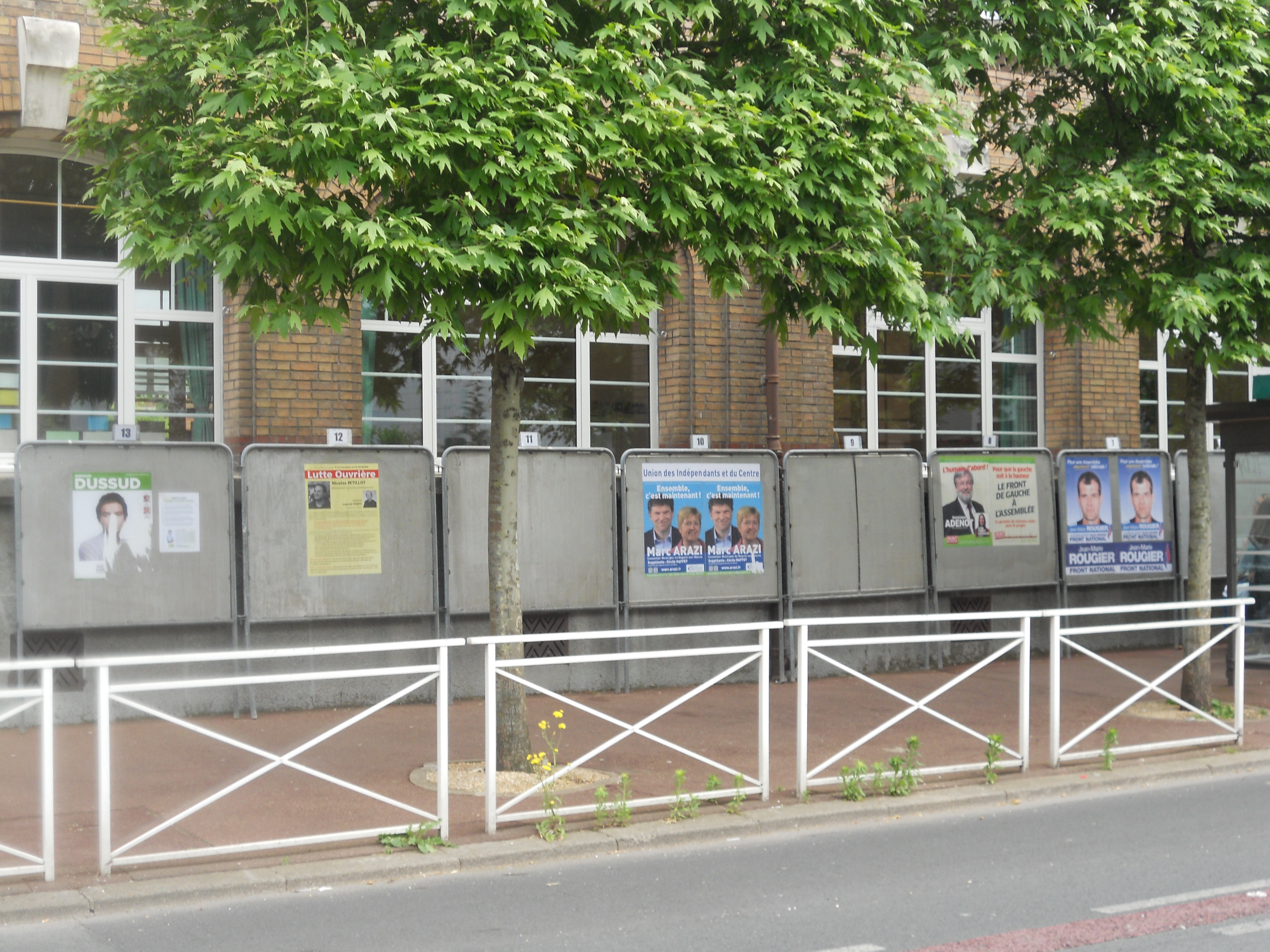
Official campaign posters in the 5th constituency of Val-de-Marne. (One of the posters has been partly torn off: a not infrequent occurrence.)

Legislative elections were held in France on 10 and 17 June 2012 (and on other dates for small numbers of voters outside metropolitan France) to select the members of the 14th National Assembly of the Fifth Republic, a little over a month after the presidential election run-off held on 6 May.

All 577 single member seats in the assembly, including those representing overseas departments and territories and French residents overseas, were contested using a two-round system.

== Background ==
=== Presidential election ===
The elections came a month after the presidential election won by François Hollande of the Socialist Party. Since 2002, legislative elections immediately follow the presidential ones. This was designed to limit the possibility of a cohabitation, whereby the President and their Prime Minister, backed by a parliamentary majority, would be of opposite parties. The aim was also to give the new president and their government a "double mandate", the election of the President being followed by that of a parliamentary majority enabling him to implement his policies. This is what happened in 2002 and 2007. Thus, in 2012, the Socialist Party has asked French citizens to "confirm" the result of the presidential election; Hollande's campaign director Pierre Moscovici argued it would not make sense to have elected a President only for him to be rendered "powerless" by the legislative election: "This President tomorrow must have a majority with which to govern". By contrast, the Union for a Popular Movement, on the right, has repeatedly asked that the left not be given "all the powers" through this election. The legislative elections in France are often described as the "third round" of the presidential election.

=== Ethnic and gender pluralism ===
In order to make possible the election of some candidates of non-European ethnic background (North African, Subsaharan African and West Indian) as well as for female candidates, the Socialist Party had, like in 2007, reserved several constituencies for them, 22 for ethnic minorities and 49% for women.

At the end of the second round, there were 13 metropolitan deputies with non-European ethnic background, including two government members (Kader Arif, former MEP, and George Pau-Langevin, already deputy since 2007) who will be replaced by their alternate candidates:

- 6 with Algerian roots: Kader Arif (PS), Kheira Bouziane (PS), Pascal Cherki (PS), Jean-François Copé (UMP), Razzy Hammadi (PS), Chaynesse Khirouni (PS)
- 2 with Lebanese roots: Christian Assaf (PS), Henri Jibrayel (PS)
- 2 with Guadeloupean roots: Hélène Geoffroy (PS), George Pau-Langevin (PS)
- 1 with Tunisian roots: Pierre Lellouche (UMP) (and Razzy Hammadi, whose mother is a Tunisian)
- 1 with Chadian roots: Seybah Dagoma (PS)
- 1 with Brazilian roots: Eduardo Rihan Cypel (PS)

Among the 11 deputies who represent French citizens abroad, one is from Réunion, Corinne Narassiguin (PS), another has Chilean roots, Sergio Coronado (EELV) and a third one has Iranian roots, Pouria Amirshahi (PS).

== Electoral system ==
A total of 6,603 candidates ran for the 577 seats, an average of 11 per constituency. Some 40% are women. The law mandates that every party must have between 49 and 51% of women among its candidates, or have their public funding significantly reduced. "Some parties, among the richest, prefer to pay the fine" rather than comply with this rule, according to Libération. The law also does not take electability into account, and significant numbers of women candidates run in constituencies where their party does not stand a real chance.

French expatriates elected their own MPs for the first time – voting early, from 23 to 26 May or on 2 or 3 June for the first round and from 6 to 12 June or on 16 or 17 June for the second, depending on their location and the method by which they cast their ballot. If an expatriate votes via the Internet, he or she has a week to do so from 23 to 26 May. A postal ballot may be cast, if received by 31 May in the Americas or by 1 June in the rest of the world. Those who prefer to vote in person in their local consulate must do so on 2 June in the Americas or 3 June in the rest of the world.

=== The two-round system ===
Each of the 577 constituencies elects one representative to the National Assembly, in a two-round election. A candidate is elected in the first round if he or she obtains an absolute majority of the vote in his or her constituency and the votes of at least one quarter of all registered voters in the constituency. If a large number of voters abstain, an absolute majority of the vote may thus not be enough, although this rarely happens. (In the 2012 election, one surprising example was in Martinique's 3rd constituency, where incumbent MP Serge Letchimy of the Martinican Progressive Party received 63.29% of the vote, but narrowly failed to be immediately elected due to a very low turnout (30.67%).) If no candidate is elected in the first round, then the two candidates who finished first and second in the first round advance automatically to the second for a runoff. They may be joined by the third- or even fourth-placed candidate; the second round is open to any candidate who has obtained the votes of at least 12.5% of registered voters in the constituency. Low turnouts therefore decrease the likelihood of a three-person runoff (known in France as a triangulaire). In the second round, the candidate who obtains the most votes is elected; an absolute majority is not required. (In the unlikely event of a tie, the elder of the tied candidates is elected.)

Candidates who advance to the second round have the option of withdrawing. Usually this happens in a triangulaire, where the party and/or candidate that finished third in the first round prefers to favour one of the two leading candidates. In the 2012 election, for example, third-placed UMP candidate Roland Chassain in the Bouches-du-Rhône's 16th constituency withdrew in order to help the National Front candidate defeat the Socialist candidate. In addition, the parties of the mainstream left (Socialist, Greens, Left Front, Radical Party of the Left, various smaller parties) have a long-standing agreement whereby they do not stand against one another in the second round. If two of them advance to the second round in the same constituency, the less-well-placed of the two automatically withdraws. In some cases, this means a triangulaire is avoided, and the left is united against a single right-wing candidate. In the 2012 election, for example, in the Hauts-de-Seine's 11th constituency, incumbent MP and Left Front candidate Marie-Hélène Amiable narrowly finished second (29.20%) behind Socialist candidate Julie Sommaruga (29.93%). Amiable withdrew, supporting Sommaruga in her runoff against New Centre candidate Jean-Loup Metton, who had finished third in the first round with enough support to advance to the second (24.15%). In other cases, this rule means that only one candidate remains in the "second round". Thus, Socialist Najia Amzal withdrew in favour of Left Front candidate and incumbent MP Marie-George Buffet in Seine-Saint-Denis's 4th constituency; Left Front candidate Patrick Le Hyaric withdrew in favour of Socialist candidate Élisabeth Guigou in Seine-Saint-Denis's 6th constituency; Left Front candidate and incumbent MP Pierre Gosnat withdrew in favour of Citizen and Republican Movement candidate Jean-Luc Laurent in the Val-de-Marne's 10th constituency; and Green candidate Stéphane Gatignon withdrew in front of the Left Front's incumbent MP François Asensi in Seine-Saint-Denis's 4th constituency. In all these cases, no candidate of the right, centre or far right had reached the second round, meaning that the best-placed and sole remaining left-wing candidate was guaranteed to be elected in a one-person "runoff".

=== Redistricting ===
The Constitutional Council approved in 2010 the first redistricting of electoral boundaries since 1986 to reflect France's changing demographics. The population ratio between the most populated and least populated constituencies was reduced from 1:3.6 to 1:2. A study by Regards Citoyens indicated that the number of seats increased in areas held by the centre-right coalition led by then governing UMP at the expense of the Socialist-led opposition coalition.

Officially, the dual purpose of the redistricting was to ensure a more equal number of voters per constituency, but also to provide seats in the National Assembly to French citizens resident overseas. Thirty-three constituencies were abolished, and thirty-three new ones created. Of the latter, nineteen were in France, while the rest of the world was divided into eleven constituencies for French residents overseas.

== Parties ==
=== Main parties and their aims ===
The Socialist Party sought to obtain a parliamentary majority with which to implement its policies. Three possible scenarios could have occurred if the left won overall:

- The Socialist Party has an absolute majority of seats, and can govern alone, without having to rely on the support of smaller left-wing or centre-left parties.
- The Socialist Party has a majority with the support of its government partners: Europe Ecology – The Greens, the Radical Party of the Left (centre-left), and the small Citizen and Republican Movement.
- The Socialist Party and its aforementioned partners lack a majority alone, and require the support of the Left Front in order to govern. The Left Front has indicated that it would never bring down the Socialist government, but that it would not systematically support the government's policies, and would require support for some of its own policy proposals.

The Union for a Popular Movement officially aimed to win the election. Its primary stated aim, however, was to obtain enough seats to prevent the left from having the 3/5ths Congress majority which would enable it to adopt constitutional reforms (such as granting the right to vote to foreign residents in local elections). The UMP's task was complicated by the popularity of the far-right National Front, which the polls indicated could obtain enough support to reach the second round in a large number of constituencies, thus splitting the right-wing vote. (Under French electoral law, in legislative elections, a third party advances to the second round if it obtains the votes of at least 12.5% of registered voters – i.e., including those who abstain.)

The Left Front aimed to have a sizable group in Parliament, with which to have meaningful influence on the policies of the Socialist government.

The National Front aimed to obtain seats in the Assembly; it had none prior to the election. A secondary aim was to "sow chaos in the UMP" by maintaining candidates in the second round and thus causing the UMP potentially to lose seats. The National Front's stated aim was eventually to replace the UMP as the main party of the right – though opinion polls credit the UMP with at least 209 seats, and the National Front with 8 at most, possibly none at all.

Europe Ecology – The Greens aimed to form an official parliamentary group, which requires having fifteen members in the Assembly. It had only three members prior to the election.

The Democratic Movement aimed to preserve its three seats, although its earlier ambitions were much higher. Opinion polls suggest the party may disappear from the Assembly completely, and is unlikely to obtain any additional seats.

In all, twelve parties or alliances stood more than a hundred candidates. The Socialist Party had 459 candidates, and endorsed candidates of allied parties in other constituencies. The UMP had 501 candidates, and endorsed candidates of allied parties (most notably the New Centre) in 69 other constituencies. The Left Front had 531 candidates. Europe Ecologie-The Greens had 465. Marine Le Pen's "Marine Blue Gathering" had 571 candidates, and was thus present in all but six constituencies. Most of these candidates were members of the National Front; others were from small, allied extreme right parties. François Bayrou's "Centre for France" alliance had 340 candidates, most of whom were members of the Democratic Movement.
Also standing over a hundred candidates were:

- Workers' Struggle: 536
- the New Anticapitalist Party: 329
- the Independent Ecological Alliance: 292
- Arise the Republic: 253
- an alliance of The Clover - The New Ecologists and the Humans, Animals, Nature Movement: 132
- the Independent Workers' Party: 103
- Pirate Party: 101

=== UMP position on the National Front ===
With the prospect of National Front candidates reaching the second round alongside the mainstream candidates of the left and right in a number of constituencies, the Socialist Party announced that it would withdraw its candidate from the second round in those constituencies, if and only if it appeared that the National Front candidate had a realistic prospect of winning. In such cases, the Socialists would support the UMP candidate as part of a "republican front" against the far right. The UMP, by contrast, refrained from saying it would withdraw and support a Socialist candidate in those same circumstances.

Instead, 64% of UMP voters said they would favour an alliance between their own party and the extreme right for the legislative election. Leading figures of the UMP rejected the possibility. Chantal Jouanno said she was worried it might be under consideration, leading party leader Jean-François Copé to assure her publicly "there will never be an alliance with the National Front". Two days before the first round, Alain Juppé called upon party members to resist the "temptation" of local alliances with the far right, arguing on "moral", "pragmatic" and "tactical grounds", highlighting ideological and policy incompatibility and the National Front's stated aim to "break" and replace the UMP.

The day after the first round, the UMP officially announced its position. The party told its candidates not to withdraw if they had entered the second round in third place behind a Socialist candidate and a candidate of the National Front. In addition, in constituencies where the second round was a runoff between the left and the National Front, the UMP would not support either candidate. Roland Chassain, UMP candidate in the Bouches-du-Rhône's 16th constituency, immediately disobeyed the party line, announcing he was withdrawing from the second round and supporting the National Front candidate. He explained that he considered himself "closer to Marine Le Pen than to the Socialist Party". In the Gard's 2nd constituency, third-placed UMP candidate Etienne Mourrut also publicly considered defying party instructions and withdrawing in favour of National Front candidate Gilbert Collard. Ultimately, he decided to comply with party instructions and remain in the race.

Simultaneously, Nadine Morano (UMP), government minister from 2008 and 2012, asked National Front voters in her constituency to support her on the grounds of the "shared values" between the right and the far right, while UMP mayor of Nice Christian Estrosi stated that the UMP has "no common values" with the Socialist Party. On 12 June, Morano published an interview in the far right newspaper Minute, calling for "as large a gathering as possible of the right". Another UMP candidate, Jean-Paul Garraud, stated that his party and the National Front had "common beliefs", a statement which was criticised by Alain Juppé as being "in total contradiction" with the stated position of the UMP.

Martine Aubry, the leader of the Socialist Party, said that her party, by contrast, would support candidates of the right against the far right, as a "Republican principle". In Vaucluse's 3rd constituency, she therefore asked Socialist candidate Catherine Arkilovitch, who had entered the second round in third place (21.98%), to withdraw and support second-placed UMP candidate Jean-Michel Ferrand (30.03%), so as to help defeat National Front candidate Marion Marechal-Le Pen (34.63%). Arkilovitch, however, defied her party and refused to withdraw.

Pierre Moscovici, Socialist Minister of Finance, stated on 12 June that the UMP had lost its way and its values and no longer knew what it stood for, in response to its position on the National Front. Later that same day, Prime Minister Jean-Marc Ayrault accused the UMP of "preparing a strategic alliance with the National Front", adding: "I think it was underway with Nicolas Sarkozy, but now the UMP really is at a turning point".

== Campaign ==
The official campaign began, in metropolitan France, on 21 May. In every constituency, each candidate has a billboard outside every polling station, upon which to display a campaign poster. Campaign material is also distributed by candidates' supporters in the streets and in letterboxes, and many campaign posters are illegally displayed in the streets. Transmitting campaign material to voters by e-mail is, however, prohibited. Nationwide, parties represented in the National Assembly prior to the election (i.e., the Union for a Popular Movement, the Socialist, Radical, Citizen and Miscellaneous Left parliamentary group, the Democratic and Republican Left parliamentary group, and the New Centre) have the right to broadcast campaign clips on television; an hour and a half is provided for the outgoing parliamentary majority, and an hour and a half for the outgoing opposition. Each side distributes this time as it sees fit between its constituent parties. Parties which are not represented in Parliament but which are standing at least 75 candidates are entitled to seven minutes of broadcast each. Any campaigning whatsoever is forbidden on the eve of the election.

The leaflets of the candidates for the French nationals abroad (Français établis à l'étranger) seats were published online on the website of the Foreign Affairs Ministry.

== Opinion polls ==
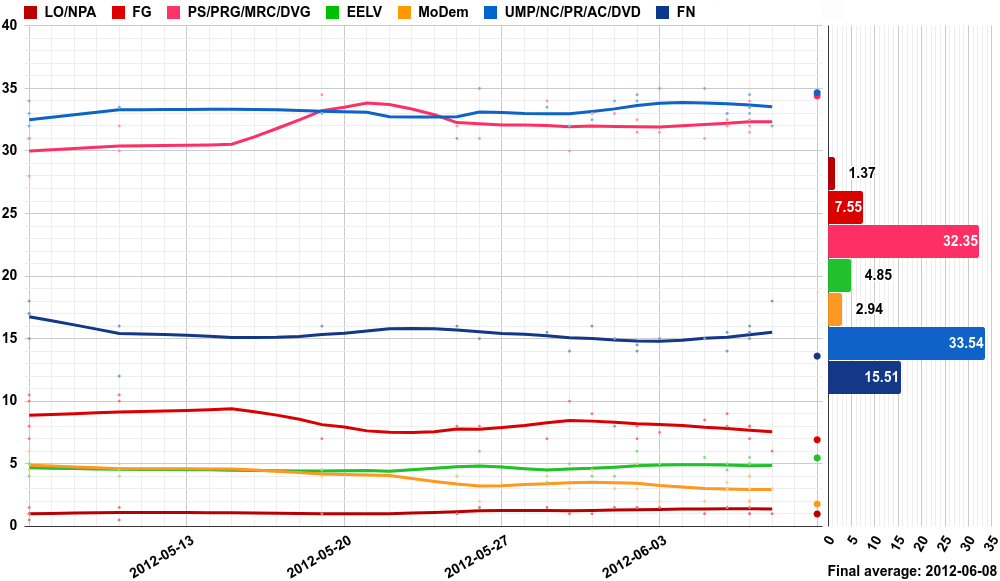

== Results ==
The election was won by the left, providing the new government with an absolute parliamentary majority. The parties of the presidential majority together have 55.97% of seats; with the Left Front providing them with supply and confidence. Among the 577 members of the Assembly, 234 were new. A record number of women were elected: 155 (26.86%). Turnout was 57.23%, a record low. Wallis and Futuna's single constituency had the highest turnout of any French electorate during the first round on 10 June, with 78% voter participation.

The Socialist Party (along with a small number of affiliated miscellaneous left candidates) obtained 300 seats, an absolute majority. Favoured by electoral alliances with the Socialist Party, its close allies, the Radical Party of the Left and the Citizen and Republican Movement, obtained respectively 13 and 2 seats, for a total of 315. This meant that the Socialists could govern without having to rely on the support of other left-wing parties – the Greens, or the Left Front.

Europe Ecology – The Greens (EELV), part of the government and of the presidential majority, also benefited from an electoral alliance with the Socialists, increasing its number of seats from just 4 to 18. (They immediately lost one, however, as EELV leader Cécile Duflot had to relinquish her seat in order to stay in government, and her seat went to her Socialist running mate.) This enabled the Greens to form an official parliamentary group. They become the third biggest party in the Assembly.

The Left Front, which decided to stand alone after electoral alliance negotiations with the Socialists broke down, lost half its seats (from 19 down to 10), despite a substantial increase in the number of votes its received. It no longer has enough seats (15) to be recognised as a parliamentary group on its own, but formed a group (the Democratic and Republican Left) with five miscellaneous left representatives from French overseas departments and territories: Huguette Bello (representing her own "For Réunion" movement; she is a dissident who left the Communist Party of Réunion shortly before the election), Alfred Marie-Jeanne and Jean Philippe Nilor (Martinican Independence Movement), Gabriel Serville (Guianese Socialist Party), and Bruno Nestor Azérot (independent left, from Martinique).

The Union for a Popular Movement (and affiliated miscellaneous right candidates), now the main opposition party, lost 112 seats, and several of its prominent members were defeated. In particular, 20 of the 41 members of the "Popular Right" (hard right) faction of the party standing for re-election lost their seats – most notably, Eric Raoult and Maryse Joissains-Masini. Immediately after the defeat, leading members of the party called for a rethink of its positioning and a reassertion of its values. Alain Juppé stated that the UMP should stand clear on its incompatibility with the National Front; François Baroin and Jean-Pierre Raffarin expressed the same view, adding that the UMP's strong "drift to the right" and increasing proximity with the ideas of the far right had been a mistake. Party leader Jean-François Copé, however, replied that he disagreed with these views.

The Democratic Movement (MoDem) lost its leader, François Bayrou, beaten in his own constituency by his Socialist challenger. The party's membership in the Assembly fell from 3 to 2: Jean Lassalle (re-elected in the Pyrénées-Atlantiques) and Thierry Robert (who gained a seat from the UMP in La Réunion). (In Mayotte, incumbent MoDem MP Abdoulatifou Aly was eliminated with a crushingly low score in the first round.) Bayrou's defeat was seen as a potentially crippling blow not just for his own career, but for the party which he had founded, and for the centre in French politics more generally. All the more so as the two centre-right parties, the New Centre and the Radical Party, both lost seats, despite an electoral alliance with the UMP. The New Centre's representation in the Assembly fell from 25 members to 14, meaning that it would no longer be recognised as a parliamentary group in itself. The Radical Party obtained just 9 seats.

The far right obtained representatives in the Assembly for the first time since the 1997 election. Party leaders Marine Le Pen and Louis Aliot were defeated, as was party spokesman Florian Philippot, but Le Pen's 22-year-old niece Marion Maréchal-Le Pen was elected in Carpentras, benefiting from a split opposition due to Socialist candidate Catherine Arkilovitch's refusal, in defiance of party instructions, to withdraw in support of the better-placed UMP candidate. Marine Le Pen's lawyer Gilbert Collard, who is not a member of the National Front but was endorsed by it, was also elected, giving the party two seats (for the first time in twenty-four years). In addition, a former member of the National Front and Movement for France, and now independent far right politician, Jacques Bompard, was elected in a constituency neighbouring Maréchal-Le Pen's, in the Vaucluse.

In overseas departments and territories, several local parties gained or maintained representation. The Guianese Socialist Party won a seat, returning to the Assembly for the first time since 1993. Its MP, Gabriel Serville, was initially to sit with the Socialists, before opting to sit with the Left Front. This was widely seen as a "goodwill gesture" by the Socialist Party, meant to enable the Left Front to pass the 15-member threshold required to form a parliamentary caucus of their own (instead of sitting as "non-aligned" members, which would have resulted in a considerable loss of financial and logistical means). The Martinican Independence Movement obtained two seats (up one from the previous election). Boinali Said, leader of the miscellaneous left "Movement against the high cost of living", won one of the two available seats in Mayotte. In New Caledonia, both seats were won by the centre-right, anti-independence Caledonia Together party, which gained them from the UMP. In French Polynesia, the conservative, pro-autonomy but anti-independence Tahoeraʻa Huiraatira won all three seats.

The far left parties, as well as the Pirate Party and the small environmentalist parties, failed to reach the second round in any constituency.

Party	First round			Second round			Total seats
Party	Votes	%	Seats	Votes	%	Seats	Total seats
Socialist Party	7,618,326	29.35	22	9,420,889	40.91	258	280
Union for a Popular Movement	7,037,268	27.12	9	8,740,628	37.95	185	194
National Front	3,528,663	13.60	0	842,695	3.66	2	2
Left Front	1,793,192	6.91	0	249,498	1.08	10	10
Europe Ecology – The Greens	1,418,264	5.46	1	829,036	3.60	16	17
Miscellaneous right	910,034	3.51	1	417,940	1.81	14	15
Miscellaneous left	881,555	3.40	1	709,395	3.08	21	22
New Centre	569,897	2.20	1	568,319	2.47	11	12
Centre for France	458,098	1.77	0	113,196	0.49	2	2
Radical Party of the Left	428,898	1.65	1	538,331	2.34	11	12
Radical Party	321,124	1.24	0	311,199	1.35	6	6
Far-left	253,386	0.98	0				0
Ecologists	249,068	0.96	0				0
Centrist Alliance	156,026	0.60	0	123,132	0.53	2	2
Regionalists and separatists (Note: Both seats won by the Martinican Independence Movement)	145,809	0.56	0	135,312	0.59	2	2
Far-right (Note: Seat won by League of the South)	49,499	0.19	0	29,738	0.13	1	1
Others	133,752	0.52	0				0
Total	25,952,859	100.00	36	23,029,308	100.00	541	577
Valid votes	25,952,859	98.42		23,029,308	96.15		
Invalid/blank votes	416,267	1.58		923,178	3.85		
Total votes	26,369,126	100.00		23,952,486	100.00		
Registered voters/turnout	46,082,104	57.22		43,233,648	55.40		
Source: Ministry of the Interior

=== Gains and losses ===
Based on notional party affiliation on dissolution after redistricting, regardless of party affiliation on previous election.

Party	Unseated	Gained	Net Result
PC (Communist Party)	6	1	-5
FASE (Communist dissidents)	1	0	-1
PG (Party of the Left)	2	0	-2
Left-wing Regionalists	0	2	+2
Left Front and allies	9	3	-6
PS (Socialist Party)	3	99	+96
MRC (Citizens' Republican Movement)	0	2	+2
PRG (Radical Party of the Left)	2	7	+5
Miscellaneous Left	3	9	+6
EELV (Greens)	1	14	+13
Left-Wing Presidential Majority	9	131	+122
Modem (Democratic Movement)	2	1	-1
Center For France	2	1	-1
NC (New Centre)	8	0	-8
AC (Centrist Alliance)	New party	2	+2
PRV (Radical Party)	10	2	-8
UMP (Union for a Popular Movement)	105	1	-104
Miscelleanous Right	5	6	+1
MPF (Movement For France)	1	0	-1
Parliamentary Right (UMP and allies)	129	11	-118
FN (National Front)	0	2	+2
Others	0	1	+1
Other Right	0	3	+3

Based on notional distribution of seats before dissolution and after the 2010 redistricting, 149 seats switched party (26% of the National Assembly, more than in any of the three previous elections). 8 seats switched from the left to the right, 9 from the extreme-left to the left, 119 from the right to the left, 3 from the right to the extreme-right, 3 from the right to the extreme-left, 2 from Modem to the left, 1 from the right to Modem. Four seats switched party within the left (two from PS to PRG, one from PRG to PS, one from PS to EELV) as a result of coalition agreements.

=== Notable individual results ===
==== Government ministers ====
It is not compulsory in France for a government minister to obtain an electoral mandate, but ministers usually do seek the legitimacy it implies. As no person may simultaneously be a member of the executive and the legislature, any government minister elected to Parliament must immediately resign from their newly obtained seat in the Assembly, in order to remain a minister. Their running mate then takes their seat, and holds it until and unless they cease to be a minister, whereupon they revert to being a member of the Assembly. Prior to the 2012 election, new Prime Minister Jean-Marc Ayrault ruled that any minister who stood in the election and was beaten would have to resign from government. Two ministers, Najat Vallaud-Belkacem and Christiane Taubira, opted to withdraw their candidacies in their respective constituencies. Twenty-five ministers (including Ayrault) did decide to stand, while the remaining eight had never expressed an intention to do so.

All government ministers standing as candidates were elected or re-elected, and were thus able to remain in government. Specifically, they fared as follows:

Minister	Party	Constituency	Result	Running mate (actual MP if elected)	Remarks
Jean-Marc Ayrault	PS	Loire-Atlantique's 3rd	Re-elected in the first round (56.21%)	Jean-Pierre Fougerat	
Laurent Fabius	PS	Seine-Maritime's 4th	Re-elected in the first round (52.81%)	Guillaume Bachelay	
Delphine Batho	PS	Deux-Sèvres's 2nd	Re-elected in the first round (53.18%)	Jean-Luc Drapeau	
Bernard Cazeneuve	PS	Manche's 4th	Elected in the first round (55.39%)	Geneviève Gosselin	Manche's 5th before redistricting (PS hold)
Victorin Lurel	PS	Guadeloupe's 4th	Re-elected in the first round (67.23%)	Hélène Vainqueur-Christophe	
Frédéric Cuvillier	PS	Pas-de-Calais's 5th	Re-elected in the first round (50.66%)	Thérèse Guilbert	
Benoît Hamon	PS	Yvelines's 11th	Elected in the second round (55.38%)	Jean-Philippe Mallé	Seat gained from the UMP
Aurélie Filippetti	PS	Moselle's 1st	Elected in the second round (59.04%)	Gérard Terrier	Incumbent for Moselle's 8th, seat abolished in redistricting. Seat gained from the UMP (swing: 11.44%)
Stéphane Le Foll	PS	Sarthe's 4th	Elected in the second round (59.45%).	Sylvie Tolmont	Seat gained from the UMP. (It had been won by UMP Prime Minister; François Fillon in 2007.)
George Pau-Langevin	PS	Paris's 15th	Elected in the second round. Awaiting specific results	Fanélie Carrey-Conte	Paris's 21st before redistricting (PS hold)
Marie-Arlette Carlotti	PS	Bouches-du-Rhône's 5th	Elected in the second round. Awaiting specific results	Avi Assouly	Seat gained from the UMP
Cécile Duflot	EELV	Paris's 6th	Elected in the second round. Awaiting specific results	Danièle Hoffman-Rispal	Redistricted from former Paris's 6th and Paris's 7th. Technically Greens gain from PS (although Duflot will keep her cabinet post and incumbent Hoffman-Ripsal will sit in the National Assembly)
Pierre Moscovici	PS	Doubs's 4th	Re-elected in the second round. Awaiting specific results	Frédéric Barbier	
François Lamy	PS	Essonne's 6th	Re-elected in the second round (57.77%)	Jérôme Guedj	
Sylvia Pinel	PRG	Tarn-et-Garonne's 2nd	Re-elected in the second round (59.86%)	Jacques Moignard	
Marisol Touraine	PS	Indre-et-Loire's 3rd	Re-elected in the second round (60.21%)	Jean-Marie Beffara	
Jérôme Cahuzac	PS	Lot-et-Garonne's 3rd	Re-elected in the second round. Awaiting specific results	Jean-Claude Gouget	
Manuel Valls	PS	Essonne's 1st	Re-elected in the second round (65.58%)	Carlos Da Silva	
Genevieve Fioraso	PS	Isère's 1st	Re-elected in the second round (58.34%)	Olivier Véran	
Alain Vidalies	PS	Landes's 1st	Re-elected in the second round (59.12%)	Florence Delaunay	
Marylise Lebranchu	PS	Finistère's 4th	Re-elected in the second round. Awaiting specific results	Gwenegan Bui	
Michèle Delaunay	PS	Gironde's 2nd	Re-elected in the second round (58.44%)	Vincent Feltesse	
Valérie Fourneyron	PS	Seine-Maritime's 1st	Re-elected in the second round (57.96%)	Pierre Léautey	
Kader Arif	PS	Haute-Garonne's 10th	Elected in the second round (57.78%)	Émilienne Poumirol	

==== Others ====
Other notable national political figures fared as follows:

Elected or re-elected:

Candidate	Party	Constituency	Result	Notability	Remarks
Noël Mamère	EELV	Gironde's 3rd	Re-elected in the first round (51.98%)	Former presidential candidate	
Élisabeth Guigou	PS	Seine-Saint-Denis's 6th	Elected in the second round in a walkover	Former minister; originator of the 2000 law on the presumption of innocence (loi Guigou)	Sole candidate in the second round following Patrick Le Hyaric's withdrawal
Marie-George Buffet	FG	Seine-Saint-Denis's 4th	Elected in the second round in a walkover	Former minister; former General Secretary of the Communist Party; former presidential candidate.	Sole candidate in the second round following Najia Amzal's withdrawal
Malek Boutih	PS	Essonne's 10th	Elected in the second round (56.84%)	Former president of SOS Racisme	
Henri Guaino	UMP	Yvelines's 3rd	Elected in the second round (61.85%)	Former special adviser to President Nicolas Sarkozy	
Jean-François Copé	UMP	Seine-et-Marne's 6th	Re-elected in the second round (59.53%)	General Secretary of the UMP	
Nathalie Kosciusko-Morizet	UMP	Essonne's 4th	Re-elected in the second round (51.48%)	Former minister	
François Fillon	UMP	Paris's 2nd	Re-elected in the second round Awaiting specific results	Former Prime Minister	
Valérie Pécresse	UMP	Yvelines's 2nd	Re-elected in the second round (58.67%)	Former minister	
François Baroin	UMP	Aube's 3rd	Re-elected in the second round Awaiting specific results	Former minister	
Bruno Le Maire	UMP	Eure's 1st	Re-elected in the second round (57.97%)	Former minister	
Luc Chatel	UMP	Haute-Marne's 1st	Re-elected in the second round (55.06%)	Former minister	
Laurent Wauquiez	UMP	Haute-Loire's 1st	Re-elected in the second round (63.95%)	Former minister	
Xavier Bertrand	UMP	Aisne's 2nd	Re-elected in the second round (50.25%)	Former minister	Retained his seat by a margin of 222 votes (0.5%). Swing: -3.03%
David Douillet	UMP	Yvelines's 12th	Elected in the second round (54.59%)	Former minister; former Olympic judo champion	
Thierry Mariani	UMP	Expatriates' 11th	Elected in the second round Awaiting specific results	Former minister	
Éric Woerth	UMP	Oise's 4th	Re-elected in the second round (59.23%)	Former minister	
Bernard Accoyer	UMP	Haute-Savoie's 1st	Re-elected in the second round (56.06%)	Former President of the National Assembly	
Hervé Morin	NC	Eure's 3rd	Re-elected in the second round (53.17%)	President of the New Centre; former minister	
Jean Lassalle	MoDem	Pyrénées-Atlantiques's 4th	Re-elected in the second round (50.98%)	Leading member of the Democratic Movement	
Jean-Louis Borloo	PR	Nord's 21st	Re-elected in the second round (55.83%)	President of the Radical Party; former minister	
Marion Maréchal-Le Pen	FN	Vaucluse's 3rd constituency	Elected in the second round (42.09%)	Granddaughter of Jean-Marrie Le Pen	
Gilbert Collard	FN	Gard's 2nd	Elected in the second round (42.82%)	Celebrity lawyer	
Nicolas Dupont-Aignan	DLR	Essonne's 8th	Re-elected in the second round (61.39%)	2012 presidential candidate	

Beaten:

Candidate	Party	Constituency	Result	Notability	Remarks
Ségolène Royal	PS	Charente-Maritime's 1st	Beaten in the second round (37.03%)	2007 presidential election runner-up	
Jack Lang	PS	Vosges's 2nd	Beaten in the second round Awaiting specific results	Veteran politician; former minister; creator of the internationally celebrated Fête de la Musique; originator of the Lang Law	
Claude Guéant	UMP	Hauts-de-Seine's 9th	Beaten in the second round (38.41%)	Former minister	
Nadine Morano	UMP	Meurthe-et-Moselle's 5th	Beaten in the second round (44.33%)	Former minister	Defeated incumbent. Swing: -8.49%
Frédéric Lefebvre	UMP	Expatriates' 1st	Beaten in the second round Awaiting specific results	Former minister	
Michèle Alliot-Marie	UMP	Pyrénées-Atlantiques's 6th	Beaten in the second round (48.38%)	Former minister	Defeated incumbent. Swing: -9.99%
François Bayrou	MoDem	Pyrénées-Atlantiques's 2nd	Beaten in three-way runoff against PS and UMP (second with 30.17%)	President of the Democratic Movement; former minister	Defeated incumbent (swing −31.04%)
Marine Le Pen	FN	Pas-de-Calais's 11th	Beaten in the second round (49.89%)	2012 presidential candidate; president of the National Front	
Louis Aliot	FN	Pyrénées-Orientales's 1st	Beaten in the second round (23.24%)	Vice-president of the National Front	
Jean-Luc Mélenchon	FG	Pas-de-Calais's 11th	Beaten; third in the first round (21.46%)	2012 presidential candidate; co-president of the Left Party; former minister	
Rama Yade	PR	Hauts-de-Seine's 2nd	Beaten; third in the first round (13.84%)	Former minister	
Nathalie Arthaud	LO	Seine-Saint-Denis's 6th	Beaten; sixth in the first round (2.47%)	2012 presidential candidate	
Philippe Poutou	NPA	Gironde's 5th	Beaten; eighth in the first round (2.12%)	2012 presidential candidate	
Maxime Rouquet	PP	Yvelines's 10th	Beaten; seventh in the first round (1.82%)	Co-president of the Pirate Party	
Jean-Marc Governatori	AEI	Alpes-Maritimes's 1st	Beaten; eighth in the first round (0.71%)	General secretary of the Independent Ecological Alliance	

== Notable races ==
These constituencies attracted particular media interest, due to the presence of a notable candidate facing for example unexpected difficulties, or on the contrary an unexpectedly easy race, or due to the prospect of a significant and meaningful change in fortune for a party. Libération published a list of "twenty-five constituencies to watch out for", with commentaries. France 24 identified eleven "constituencies to watch out for".

=== Pas-de-Calais 11th ===
For the first time, two major candidates from the presidential election stood in the same constituency for the legislative election. Jean-Luc Mélenchon (Left Front) and Marine Le Pen (National Front) are both standing in the Pas-de-Calais's 11th constituency, centred on the town of Hénin-Beaumont. The incumbent MP, Odette Duriez of the Socialist Party, didn't stand for re-election; the Socialist candidate was Philippe Kemel. The Le Pen-Mélenchon duel attracted international media attention, including for what it revealed of attitudes and expectations in an area of northern France hit hard by deindustrialisation and unemployment. The Guardian noted that, in that regard, "Mélenchon blames what he sees as pernicious free-market capitalism and bankers; Le Pen points the finger at immigrants and Europe".

On the first round, Le Pen won a plurality of the vote. The left-wing vote was split, with the Socialist candidate Philippe Kemel receiving more votes than Mélenchon. All three candidates qualified for the run-off, but Mélenchon withdrew and supported Kemel for the second round. Kemel narrowly won the seat (retaining it for the Socialist Party) with 50.1% of the vote, defeating Marine Le Pen.

Pas-de-Calais's 11th constituency – 2nd round
Party	Candidate	Votes	%	±%
PS	Philippe Kemel	26,812	50.11	−11.55
FN	Marine Le Pen	26,694	49.89	n/a
Turnout		55,712	59.18	+1.94
PS hold		Swing	-11.55	

=== Pyrénées-Atlantiques 2nd ===
Attention was also drawn to the Pyrénées-Atlantiques's 2nd constituency, where presidential candidate François Bayrou of the centrist Democratic Movement was hoping to retain his seat. Bayrou had held the seat continuously since 1988, but the press raised the possibility that he might this time be beaten. Until 2002, the mainstream right had not stood a candidate against him, and in 2007 the candidate of the Union for a Popular Movement had withdrawn in his favour in the second round. Following Bayrou's personal endorsement of François Hollande for the second round of the 2012 presidential election, however, the UMP maintained a candidate against him. He also had to contend with a Socialist opponent, despite there having been talk in the Socialist Party of not standing a candidate in his constituency, as a gesture of acknowledgment for his endorsement of Hollande.

Bayrou was defeated, with the seat going to Socialist candidate Nathalie Chabanne.

Pyrénées-Atlantiques's 2nd constituency – 2nd round
Party	Candidate	Votes	%	±%
PS	Nathalie Chabanne	20,090	42.78	+3.99
MoDem	François Bayrou	14,169	30.17	−31.04
UMP	Éric Saubatte	12,700	27.04	n/a
Turnout		48,151	61.99	−0.75
PS gain from MoDem		Swing		

=== Charente-Maritime 1st ===
In Charente-Maritime's 1st constituency, no candidate of the right, centre or far right reached the second round. The second round was between Ségolène Royal, the Socialist Party's candidate to the 2007 presidential election (who obtained 32.03% in the first round) and a dissident Socialist, Olivier Falorni (28.91%).

Falorni won the seat, defeating Royal by a comfortable margin.

Charente-Maritime's 1st constituency – 2nd round
Party	Candidate	Votes	%	±%
DVG	Olivier Falorni	38,539	62.97	n/a
PS	Ségolène Royal	22,667	37.03	−18.02
Turnout		63,247	64.05	−0.08
DVG gain from PS		Swing		

=== Paris 4th ===
In well-off Paris's 4th constituency, the opposite situation arose: the two candidates qualified for the second round were both from the right: Bernard Debré for the UMP (45.07% in the first round), and Brigitte Kuster, a UMP dissident (23.01%). Immediately after the first round, however, Kuster withdrew. There was a second round nonetheless, but with only one candidate, who needed simply to receive one vote in order to be elected. This configuration also happened in several constituencies on the left (see subsection "The two-round electoral system", below).

Paris's 4th constituency – 2nd round
Party	Candidate	Votes	%	±%
UMP	Bernard Debré	20,526	100	n/a
Turnout		25,696	38.13	n/a
UMP hold		Swing	n/a	

=== Hauts-de-Seine 9th ===
The Hauts-de-Seine's 9th constituency, traditionally a very safe seat for the right, raised unexpected difficulties for UMP candidate and former Minister of the Interior Claude Guéant. A dissident member of the UMP, Thierry Solere, contested his legitimacy, stood against him, and reached the second round, precipitating a three-way runoff between two candidates of the right and one of the left.

Solere narrowly won the seat, obtaining votes from the left given Gueant's unpopularity on that side. The total share of the vote for left-wing candidates was 28%, in the first round, plus 4% for the Modem candidate.

Hauts-de-Seine 9th – 2nd round
Party	Candidate	Votes	%	±%
DVD	Thierry Solere	13,912	39.35	n/a
UMP	Claude Guéant	13,578	38.41	n/a
PS	Martine Even	7,864	22.24	n/a
Turnout		35,918	58.86	n/a
DVD gain from UMP		Swing	n/a	

=== Meurthe-et-Moselle 5th ===
This constituency drew attention due to the behaviour and situation of UMP candidate Nadine Morano, who had been Minister for Professional Training in François Fillon's government from 2010 to 2012. She finished second in the first round (34.33%) behind Socialist candidate Dominique Potier (39.29%) and, in the hopes of obtaining more votes in the second, appealed explicitly to the voters of the eliminated National Front, on the grounds of "common values" in what she called a "duel between the right and the left". She defined her common values with far right voters as including "control over immigration, refusing to give foreigners the right to vote" and "the protection of our borders". After she had published an appeal in a far right newspaper, Prime Minister Jean-Marc Ayrault and the leader of the Greens and Minister for Housing Cécile Duflot both described her behaviour as symptomatic of a worrying shift of part of the right towards the extreme right; Ayrault accused her of renouncing her party's values to try and save her seat. Her situation made headlines again when humorist Gérald Dahan phoned her, pretending to be National Front vice-president Louis Aliot, and recorded her expressing her sympathy and closeness to the National Front. François Fillon publicly rebuked her for not having immediately hung up, saying "we don't talk to the leaders of the National Front. We must reject all forms of extremism". Morano hit back, telling him she was a "free politician".

Morano, the incumbent, lost her seat to Socialist candidate Dominique Potier by a 10% margin.

Meurthe-et-Moselle's 5th constituency – 2nd round
Party	Candidate	Votes	%	±%
PS	Dominique Potier	25,122	55.67	+8.49
UMP	Nadine Morano	20,006	44.33	−8.49
Turnout		47,046	61.34	−0.01
PS gain from UMP		Swing	+8.49	

=== Bouches-du-Rhône 5th ===
Marie-Arlette Carlotti, junior Minister for the Disabled, stood in this constituency against the UMP incumbent Renaud Muselier, who had held the seat since 1993. On paper, media reported that, of all the twenty-six ministers standing in the legislative elections, she seemed the least likely to win her constituency. Had she lost, she would have had to resign from the government. She was elected with 51.8%, a result which was also described as having a significant impact on local politics in Marseille. As minister, she would not be able to sit in Parliament; as long as she stays in the government, her seat goes to her running mate, Avi Assouly, locally famous as a former radio football presenter.

Bouches-du-Rhône 5th constituency – 2nd round
Party	Candidate	Votes	%	±%
PS	Marie-Arlette Carlotti	20,212	51.81	
UMP	Renaud Muselier	18,799	48.19	
Turnout				
PS gain from UMP		Swing		

=== Essonne 8th ===
In addition to Marine Le Pen, Jean-Luc Mélenchon and François Bayrou, three candidates from the presidential election were standing in this legislative election. Nicolas Dupont-Aignan (Arise the Republic) finished first in the first round in Essonne's 8th constituency, with 42.82% of the vote, heading into a runoff with Socialist candidate Aude Bristot (30.2%), and eliminating UMP candidate Laurent Béteille (9.52%). In the Gironde's 5th constituency, Philippe Poutou (New Anticapitalist Party) finished eighth and was thus eliminated in the first round, receiving just 2.12% of the vote. In Seine-Saint-Denis's 6th constituency, Nathalie Arthaud (Workers' Struggle) finished sixth with 2.47%, far behind the Socialist incumbent and former Minister for Social Affairs Élisabeth Guigou (46.12%) and the director of l'Humanité, Patrick Le Hyaric, standing for the Left Front (17.33%).

Essonne's 8th constituency – 2nd round
Party	Candidate	Votes	%	±%
DLR	Nicolas Dupont-Aignan	25,989	61.39	
PS	Aude Bristot	16,342	38.61	
Turnout		43,077	57.18	
DLR hold		Swing	+4.01	
