= Pas-de-Calais's 11th constituency =

Constituency of the National Assembly of France

11th constituency of the Pas-de-Calais
- inline Constituency of the National Assembly of France

- Pas-de-Calais' 11th constituency shown within Pas-de-Calais
- Deputy: Marine Le Pen; RN
- Department: Pas-de-Calais
- Cantons: Carvin, Courrières, Hénin-Beaumont, Leforest, Montigny-en-Gohelle, Rouvroy
- Registered voters: 89,833

The 11th constituency of the Pas-de-Calais is a French legislative constituency in the Pas-de-Calais département. It elects one député to the National Assembly. It has been represented by Marine Le Pen since 2017.

== Description ==
For the 2012 French legislative election, the constituency attracted nationwide and international attention, as for the first time two candidates from the 2012 French presidential election stood as candidates there: Marine Le Pen of the National Front and Jean-Luc Mélenchon of the Left Front. Since 2007, Le Pen had been an opposition member of the Socialist Party-held town council in Hénin-Beaumont, the largest town in the constituency, while Mélenchon had argued that the Pas-de-Calais is "the birthplace of the workers' movement in France and should not be abandoned to the far-right". Opinion polls a month before the election suggested Le Pen would finish first in the first round, during which the political left was divided among several parties, but she would be beaten by Kemel or Mélenchon in the second round, with the Left Front potentially taking the constituency from the locally embattled Socialists. The Le Pen–Mélenchon duel attracted international media attention, including for what it revealed of attitudes and expectations in an area of northern France hit hard by deindustrialisation and unemployment. The Guardian wrote that, in that regard, "Mélenchon blames what he sees as pernicious free-market capitalism and bankers; Le Pen points the finger at immigrants and Europe".

== Previous office-holders ==
The seat had traditionally been held by the French Left until 2017. In 1988, Socialist candidate Noël Josèphe had been the only candidate in the second round, which he won unopposed. In 1993, the seat went to the French Communist Party member Rémy Auchedé; Marcel Cabiddu, winning unopposed in the second round, took it back for the Socialists in 1997; he was re-elected in 2002. Upon his death in 2004, the seat went to his suppléante Odette Duriez, who then won the 2007 election.

Election	Member	Party
1986	Proportional representation – no election by constituency	
1988	Noël Josèphe	PS
1993	Rémy Auchedé	PCF
1997	Marcel Cabiddu	PS
2002	Marcel Cabiddu	PS
2004	Odette Duriez	PS
2007	Odette Duriez	PS
2012	Philippe Kemel	PS
2017	Marine Le Pen	FN
2022	Marine Le Pen	RN
2024	Marine Le Pen	RN

== Election results ==
=== 2024 ===
Candidate	Party	Alliance	First round			Second round		
Candidate	Party	Alliance	Votes	%	+/–	Votes	%	+/–
Marine Le Pen	RN		32,681	58.04	+4.08			
Samira Laal	PS	NFP	14,666	26.05	+2.62			
Dorian Lamy	UDI	Ensemble	4,269	7.58	-4.74			
Michel Lanoy	LR	UDC	2,676	4.75	new			
Geoffrey Fournier	REC		813	1.44	new			
Dominique Gai	LO		786	1.40	-0.11			
Gautier Weinmann	DVG		417	0.74				
Votes			56,308	100.00				
Valid votes			56,308	96.86	-1.17			
Blank votes			1,225	2.11	+0.91			
Null votes			601	1.03	+0.26			
Turnout			58,134	61.74	+19.14			
Abstentions			36,032	38.26	-19.14			
Registered voters			94,166					
Result			RN HOLD					

=== 2022 ===
2022 French legislative election: Pas-de-Calais's 11th constituency
Party	Candidate	Votes	%	±%
RN	Marine Le Pen	21,219	53.96	+7.94
EELV (NUPÉS)	Marine Tondelier	9,214	23.43	–5.92
LREM (Ensemble)	Alexandrine Pintus	4,846	12.32	–4.11
Others	N/A	4,045	10.29	
Turnout		39,324	42.60	–4.07
2nd round result
RN	Marine Le Pen	22,301	61.03	+2.43
EELV (NUPÉS)	Marine Tondelier	14,238	38.97	N/A
Turnout		36,539	41.63	–2.04
RN hold				

=== 2017 ===
Philippe Kemel of the Socialist Party, the incumbent deputy, was defeated in the first round. This left only Marine Le Pen, who finished second by less than half a percentage point in the 2012 election, and Anne Roquet of President Emmanuel Macron's recently created En Marche! party. Jean-Luc Mélenchon, who came in third in the first round of the 2012 election, did not run, instead opting to run for a seat in Bouches-du-Rhône's 4th constituency. He was replaced by Jean-Pierre Carpentier of La France insoumise, a party founded by Mélenchon, and finished in fourth place.

Candidate	Label	First round		Second round	
Candidate	Label	Votes	%	Votes	%
Marine Le Pen	FN	19,997	46.02	22,769	58.60
Anne Roquet	REM	7,141	16.43	16,084	41.40
Philippe Kemel	PS	4,705	10.83		
Jean-Pierre Carpentier	FI	4,334	9.97		
Hervé Poly	PCF	2,172	5.00		
Alexandrine Pintus	LR	1,818	4.18		
Marine Tondelier	ECO	1,542	3.55		
Flore Lataste	EXG	475	1.09		
Rachid Ferahtia	ECO	456	1.05		
Betty Leclercq	DLF	346	0.80		
Aude Lesage	DIV	215	0.49		
Vincent Caflers	EXD	166	0.38		
Jacques Nikonoff	DVG	85	0.20		
Votes		43,452	100.00	38,853	100.00
Valid votes		43,452	98.09	38,853	93.72
Blank votes		510	1.15	1,594	3.85
Null votes		337	0.76	1,009	2.43
Turnout		44,299	46.67	41,456	43.67
Abstentions		50,618	53.33	53,468	56.33
Registered voters		94,917		94,924	
Source: Ministry of the Interior

=== 2012 ===
The Union for a Popular Movement did not present a candidate of its own, and instead endorsed as candidate a member of the Democratic Movement, Jean Urbaniak. Urbaniak officially stood as an independent candidate of the centre-right.

A debate was organised among the five main candidates (Kemel, Le Pen, Mélenchon, Tondelier, and Urbaniak) on the regional edition of the France 3 television channel.

2012 French legislative election in Pas-de-Calais' 11th constituency
Candidate	Party	First round		Second round	
Candidate	Party	Votes	%	Votes	%
Marine Le Pen	FN	22,460	42.26%	26,696	49.89%
Philippe Kemel	PS	12,609	23.72%	26,814	50.11%
Jean-Luc Mélenchon	FG	11,406	21.46%		
Jean Urbaniak	MoDem	4,179	7.86%		
Marine Tondelier	EELV	849	1.60%		
Michel Vast	DLR	488	0.92%		
Murielle Richet	LT	331	0.62%		
Nathalie Hubert	LO	330	0.62%		
Séverine Duval	NPA	177	0.33%		
Michèle Dessenne	M'PEP–PRCF	94	0.18%		
Mohamed Bousnane	AEI	85	0.16%		
Rachida Sahraoui	PR	80	0.15%		
Pierre Rose	COC62 (POC)	61	0.11%		
Daniel Cucchiaro	Ecologist	0	0.00%		
Valid votes		53,149	98.20%	53,510	96.10%
Spoilt and null votes		975	1.80%	2,173	3.90%
Votes cast / turnout		54,124	57.50%	55,683	59.15%
Abstentions		40,011	42.50%	38,452	40.85%
Registered voters		94,135	100.00%	94,135	100.00%

=== 2007 ===
2007 French legislative election: Pas-de-Calais 11th – 2nd round
Party	Candidate	Votes	%	±%
PS	Odette Duriez	32,595	61.66	−7.37
UMP	Myriam Wonterghem	20,265	38.34	n/a
Turnout		55,319	57.24	−3.96
PS hold		Swing	−7.37	

2007 French legislative election: Pas-de-Calais 11th – 1st round
Party	Candidate	Votes	%	±%
PS	Odette Duriez	18,476	33.62 30.16	+3.46
UMP	Myriam Wonterghem	14,368	26.14	+12.68
FN	Éric Iorio	5,201	9.46	−12.01
PCF	Jean Clarisse	4,805	8.74	N/A
UDF	Jean-Philippe Boonaert	3,385	6.16	−2.85
LCR	Séverine Duval	1,972	3.59	+2.05
LV	Jacques Switalski	1,518	2.76	+0.14
MPF	Martine Lefebure Thevenet	1,295	2.36	+1.24
CPNT	Rosemonde Lefrancq	1,022	1.86	+0.09
LO	Régis Scheenaerts	1,010	1.84	−0.42
DVE	Murielle Richet	1,004	1.83	
DVD	Philippe Morin	906	1.65	N/A
Turnout		56,629	58.59	−2.61

=== 2002 ===
Two candidates stood under the Communist label, including former MP Rémy Auchedé (by now a dissident), but neither was endorsed by the French Communist Party.

2002 French legislative election: Pas-de-Calais 11th – 2nd round
Party	Candidate	Votes	%	±%
PS	Marcel Cabiddu	32,078	69.03	
FN	Éric Iorio	14,390	30.97	
Turnout		51,673	56.25	
PS hold		Swing		

2002 French legislative election: Pas-de-Calais 11th – 1st round
Party	Candidate	Votes	%	±%
PS	Marcel Cabiddu	16,404	30.16	
FN	Éric Iorio	10,047	18.47	
UMP	Myriam Wonterghem Billiaux	7,322	13.46	
Communist	Rémy Auchedé	6,303	11.59	
UDF	Annie Delannoy Jumez	4,899	9.01	
Communist	Muriel Dutrieu	1,750	3.22	
LV	Jacques Switalski	1,423	2.62	
LO	Régis Scheenaerts	1,229	2.26	
CPNT	Chantal Créton	960	1.77	
Other	Cathy Burgeat	902	1.66	
LCR	Séverine Duval	835	1.54	
MNR	Marcel Part	644	1.18	
MPF	Bernadette Dury	611	1.12	
DVD	David Masson	573	1.05	
DVE	Catherine Lebrun	304	0.56	
DVE	Éliane Stegner	182	0.33	
Turnout		56,223	61.20	

=== 1997 ===
1997 French legislative election: Pas-de-Calais's 11th constituency
Party	Candidate	Votes	%	±%
PS	Marcel Cabiddu	17,304	28.17	
PCF	Rémy Auchedé*	17,028	27.72	
FN	Eric Iorio	10,112	16.46	
UDF	Dominique Josien	9,585	15.60	
LV	Joseph Pasquier	3,499	5.70	
LO	Frédéric Scheers	2,317	3.77	
DVD	René Beaugrand	1,591	2.59	
Turnout		64,755	74.17	
2nd round result
PS	Marcel Cabiddu	34,412	100.00	
Turnout		50,746	58.12	
PS gain from PCF				

* Withdrew before the second round
