= Duriez =

Duriez is a surname. Notable people with the surname include:

- Colin Duriez (born 1947), English writer
- Marcel Duriez (1940–2023), French hurdler
- Odette Duriez (born 1948), French politician
