= Dominique Potier =

French politician

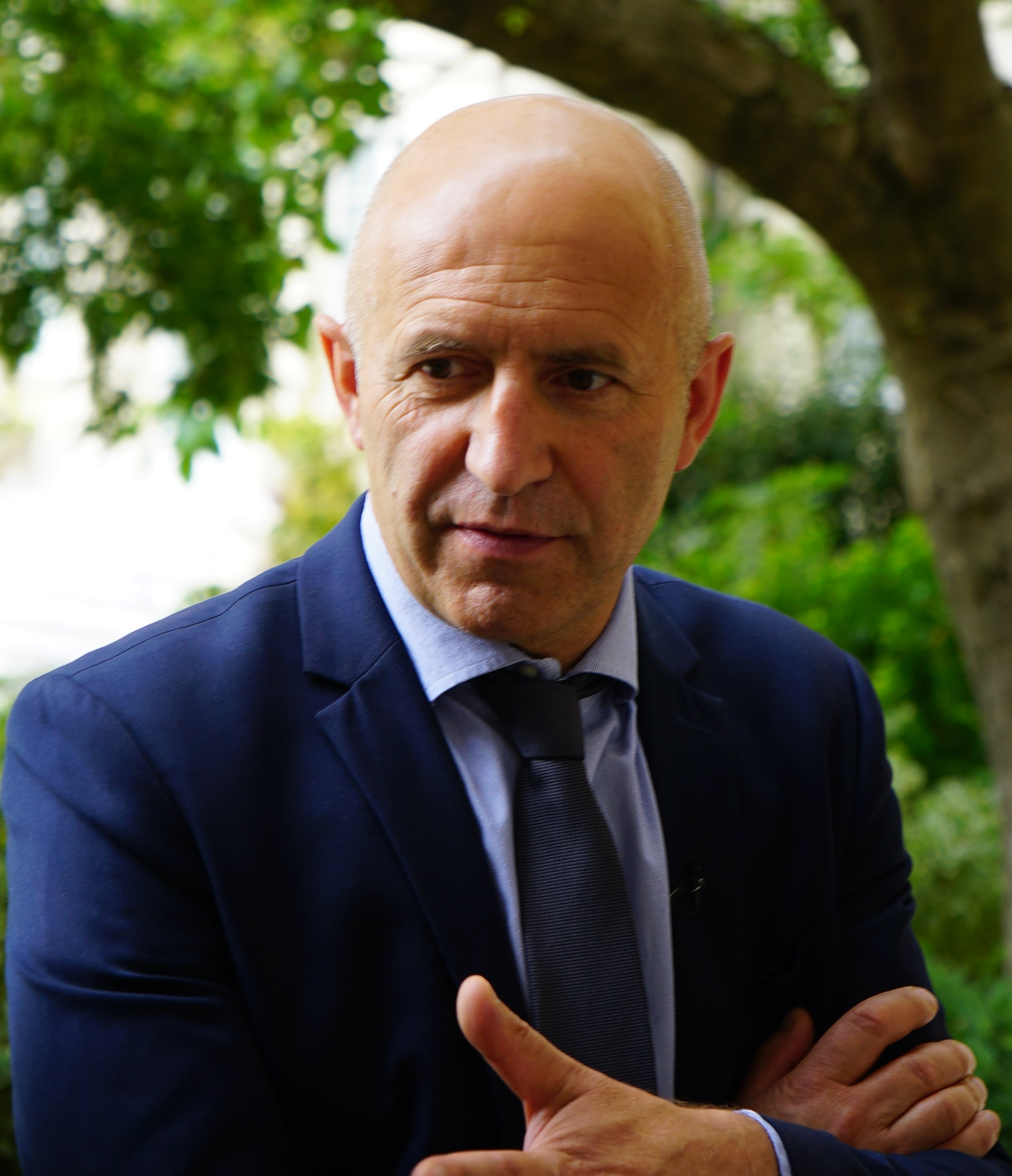

Member of the National Assembly
- In office 20 June 2012 – 9 June 2024
- Preceded by: Philippe Morenvillier
- Parliamentary group: SER
- Constituency: Meurthe-et-Moselle's 5th constituency

Mayor of Lay-Saint-Remy
- In office 18 March 1001 – 5 April 2014
- Preceded by: Michel Hager
- Succeeded by: Clément Verdelet

Personal details
- Born: 17 March 1954 (age 72) Toul, Meurthe-et-Moselle, France
- Party: Socialist
- Profession: farmer

Dominique Potier (born 17 March 1954) is a French Socialist politician who has represented Meurthe-et-Moselle's 5th constituency in the National Assembly of France since 2012.

Potier was re-elected in the 2022 French legislative election.
