= George Pau-Langevin =

French politician

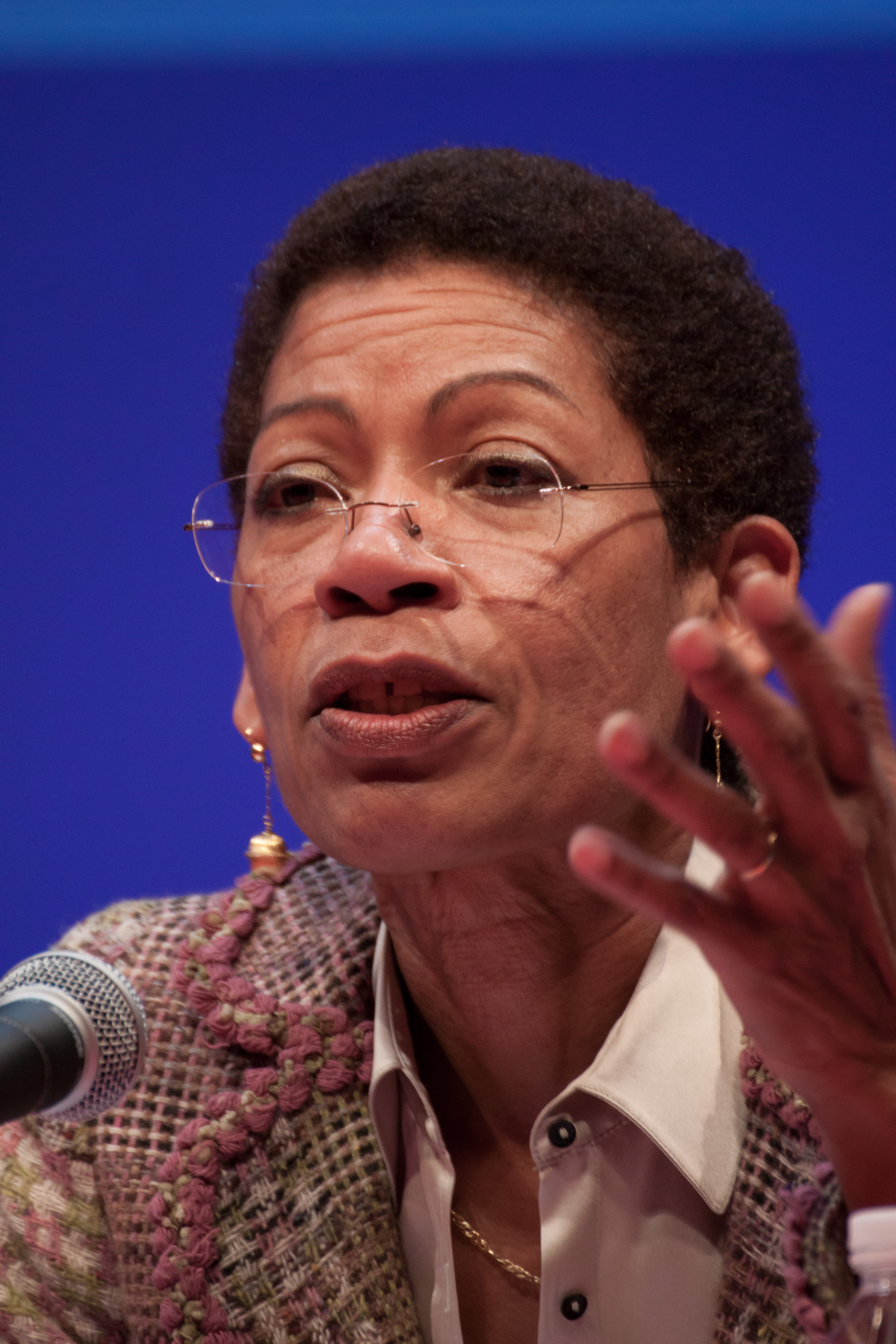
- George Pau-Langevin in 2013

Deputy Defender of Rights
- Incumbent
- Assumed office 16 November 2020
- President: Emmanuel Macron

Member of the National Assembly for Paris's 15th constituency
- In office 1 October 2016 – 20 November 2020
- Preceded by: Fanélie Carrey-Conte
- Succeeded by: Lamia El Aaraje
- In office 20 June 2012 – 21 July 2012
- Preceded by: Constituencies re-arranged - the 15th constituency is similar to the previous 21st constituency, held by Pau-Langevin prior to its abolition
- Succeeded by: Fanélie Carrey-Conte

Minister of Overseas Territories
- In office 1 April 2014 – 30 August 2016
- President: François Hollande
- Prime Minister: Manuel Valls
- Preceded by: Victorin Lurel
- Succeeded by: Ericka Bareigts

Junior Minister for Educational Success
- In office 1 April 2014 – 30 August 2016
- President: François Hollande
- Prime Minister: Jean-Marc Ayrault

Member of the National Assembly for Paris's 21st constituency
- In office 19 June 2007 – 19 June 2012
- Preceded by: Michel Charzat
- Succeeded by: Constituency removed, but mostly moved to the new 15th constituency, held by Pau-Langevin

Member of the Regional Council of Île-de-France
- In office 23 March 1992 – 15 March 1998
- President: Michel Giraud

Personal details
- Born: 19 October 1948 (age 77) Pointe-à-Pitre, Guadeloupe
- Party: Socialist Party
- Education: Paris 1 Panthéon-Sorbonne University; Paris 2 Panthéon-Assas University
- Profession: Lawyer

George Pau-Langevin (French pronunciation: [ʒɔʁʒ po lɑ̃ʒvɛ̃]; born 19 October 1948 in Pointe-à-Pitre, Guadeloupe) is a French lawyer and politician. A member of the Socialist Party (PS). Close to Bertrand Delanoë, she was deputy for the 21st constituency of Paris from 2007 to 2012, then re-elected in the 15th constituency, which took over roughly the same territory in Paris, in 2012. She was the Minister Delegate for Educational Success in the governments of Jean-Marc Ayrault from 2012 to 2014, then was appointed Minister of Overseas Territories in 2014 in the governments of Manuel Valls. Resigning in 2016, she regained her seat as a deputy and was re-elected the following year. She left the National Assembly in November 2020, following her appointment as Deputy Defender of Rights.

== Early life and education ==
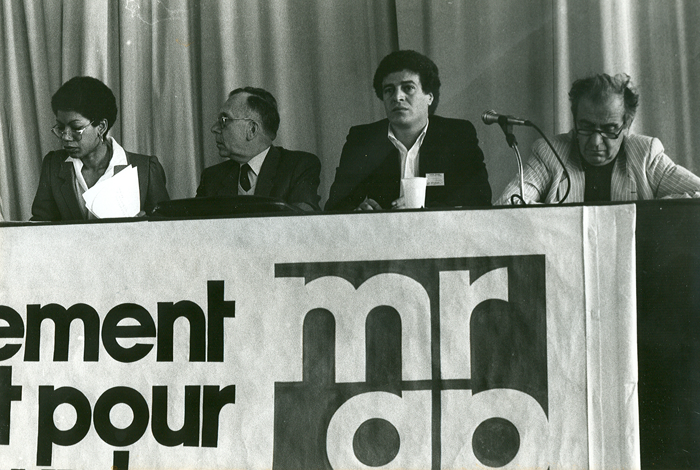
George Pau-Langevin in 1989

Pau-Langevin was president of the Movement against racism and for friendship between peoples from 1984 to 1987. In 1989, she joined the National Agency for the Promotion and Integration of Workers from Overseas as deputy director, which she later directed from 1997 to 2001.

== Political career ==
=== Career in local politics ===
Municipal councilor of the 20th arrondissement of Paris from 1989 to 1995, Pau-Langevin found this function during the municipal elections of 2008, elected on the list led by Frédérique Calandra.

Pau-Langevin was one of the initiators of the name change of the street Richepanse (general who contributed to reestablish slavery in Guadeloupe in 1802, on the order of Bonaparte) in street Chevalier-de-Saint-George, in the 1st arrondissement of Paris (named after a Métis from Guadeloupe, swordsman, violinist, conductor and famous composer, from the second half of the 18th century).

Pau-Langevin was a member of the Regional council of Île-de-France from 1992 to 1998.

=== Member of the National Assembly ===
Pau-Langevin was elected member of the National Assembly for Paris's 21st constituency during the 2007 French legislative election. During her first term, she was the only black deputy from mainland France. In parliament, she served on the Committee on Legal Affairs (2007-2012).

As vice-president of the Socialist, Radical and Citizen Group (SRC) in the National Assembly, Pau-Langevin was in charge of immigration and co-development issues between 2007 and 2009. In this capacity, she is responsible for the opposition to the September 2007 bill relating to immigration control, integration and asylum. She fights the measure relating to DNA tests within the framework of family reunification and seizes, with her colleagues of the socialist group, the Constitutional Council on the subject of ethnic statistics.

During the 2012 legislative elections, Pau-Langevin was elected member of the National Assembly in the Paris's 15th constituency, which mostly covered the same area of Paris as the abolished 21st constituency after the 2010 redistricting of French legislative constituencies. Her appointment as minister leads her to leave her mandate to her substitute, Fanélie Carrey-Conte, who exercises it from 22 July 2012.

=== Career in government ===
Following François Hollande's victory in the 2012 presidential election, Pau-Langevin was appointed Junior Minister for Educational Success in the government of Prime Minister Jean-Marc Ayrault.

Pau-Langevin's tenure at the Ministry of Educational Success includes measures in favor of the School's relationship with parents, equality and against discrimination, the holding of meetings with the Minister of the city and all stakeholders of educational success, the creation of a National Observatory of educational success and the attribution of the Great National Cause 2013 to the fight against illiteracy.

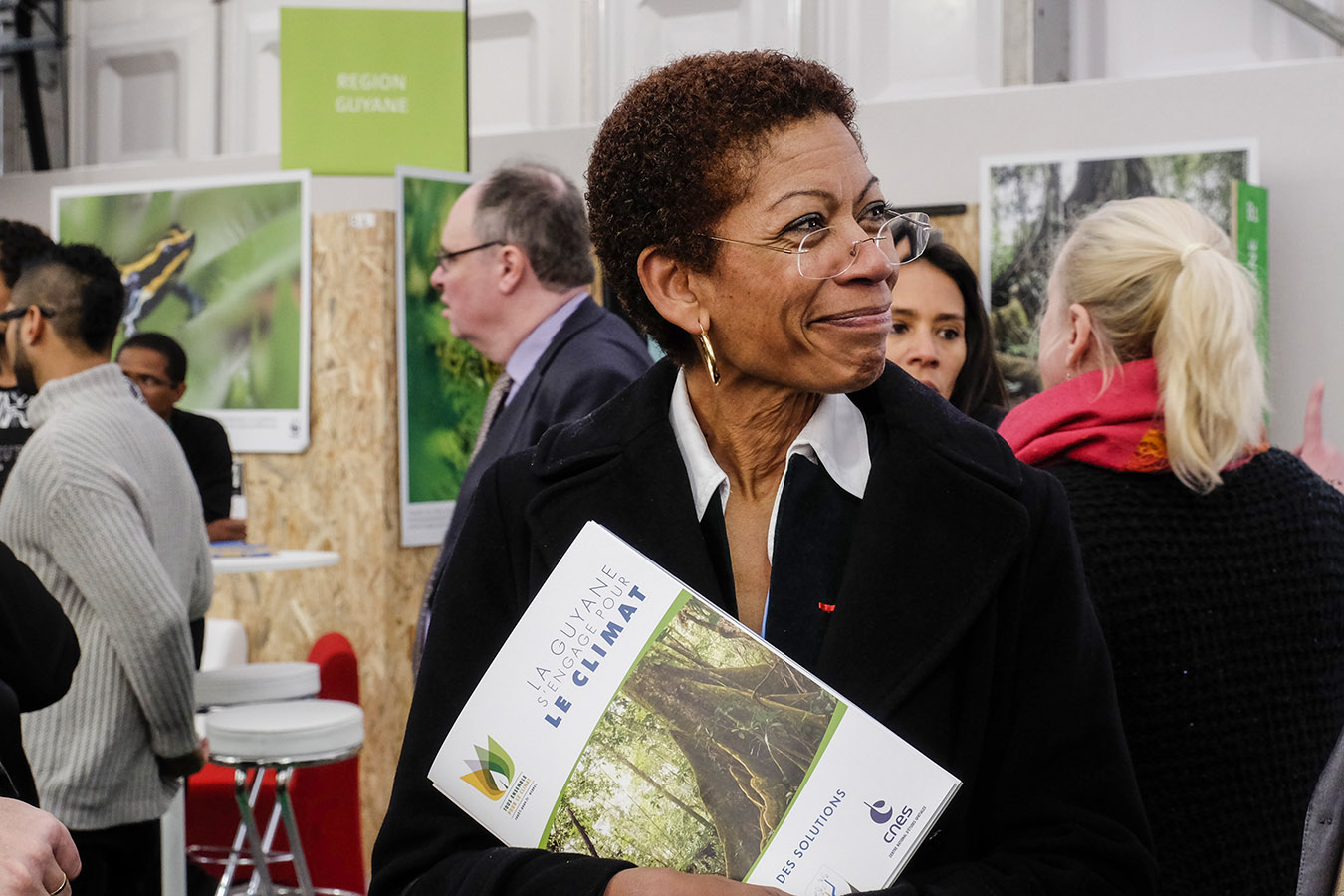
George Pau-Langevin during the 2015 United Nations Climate Change Conference

During the reshuffle of 2 April 2014, following the defeat of the majority in the municipal elections, Pau-Langevin was appointed Minister of Overseas in the First Valls government in place of Victorin Lurel. She was reappointed to this post on 27 August 2014 in the Second Valls government, even if her departure is envisaged during the reshuffle of February 2016.

In this capacity, Pau-Langevin presented several plans for the overseas territories (youth, housing, health, security) and in April 2016 managed several nights of urban violence in Mayotte. She also prepared, jointly with the Secretary of State for Real Equality Ericka Bareigts, a bill for real equality overseas, providing for a development plan to gradually reduce the differences in living standards and quality of life and the creation of the future Cité des Outre-mer.

Pau-Langevin announced her resignation on 30 August 2016 (the same day as Emmanuel Macron) for personal reasons [and] regaining contact with the field, after having however made a press conference back to school the same morning. She was replaced by Ericka Bareigts.

In the Socialist Party's 2017 presidential primaries, Pau-Langevin endorsed Vincent Peillon as her party's candidate for that year's presidential election and worked on his campaign team.

=== Return to the National Assembly ===
Running for re-election in the 2017 legislative elections, Pau-Langevin won the second round with 60.3% of the votes cast, in a constituency where La République en marche had not invested a candidate.

In parliament, Pau-Langevin has served on the Committee on Cultural Affairs and Education (2017-2019) and the Committee on Legal Affairs (since 2019). In December 2018, she was appointed rapporteur for the "flash mission" on the future of France Ô, but later withdrew from the mission on 22 March 2019, believing that, despite several reminders, the work of this mission did not start. During an interview, here are these propros : "we're already running France Ô. This is something serious and that is why I will not continue this mission because I feel that it is useless".

Ahead of the Socialist Party's 2018 convention in Aubervilliers, Pau-Langevin publicly endorsed Stéphane Le Foll as candidate for the party's leadership.

In addition to her committee assignments, Pau-Langevin was appointed by Prime Minister Jean Castex as deputy of Ombudsman (Défenseur des droits) Claire Hédon in 2020. She left the Assembly in November 2020.

== Recognition ==
Pau-Langevin was decorated with the Legion of Honour in March 2002.

== Links ==
- Page on the French National Assembly website
