= Nadine Morano =

French politician (born 1963)

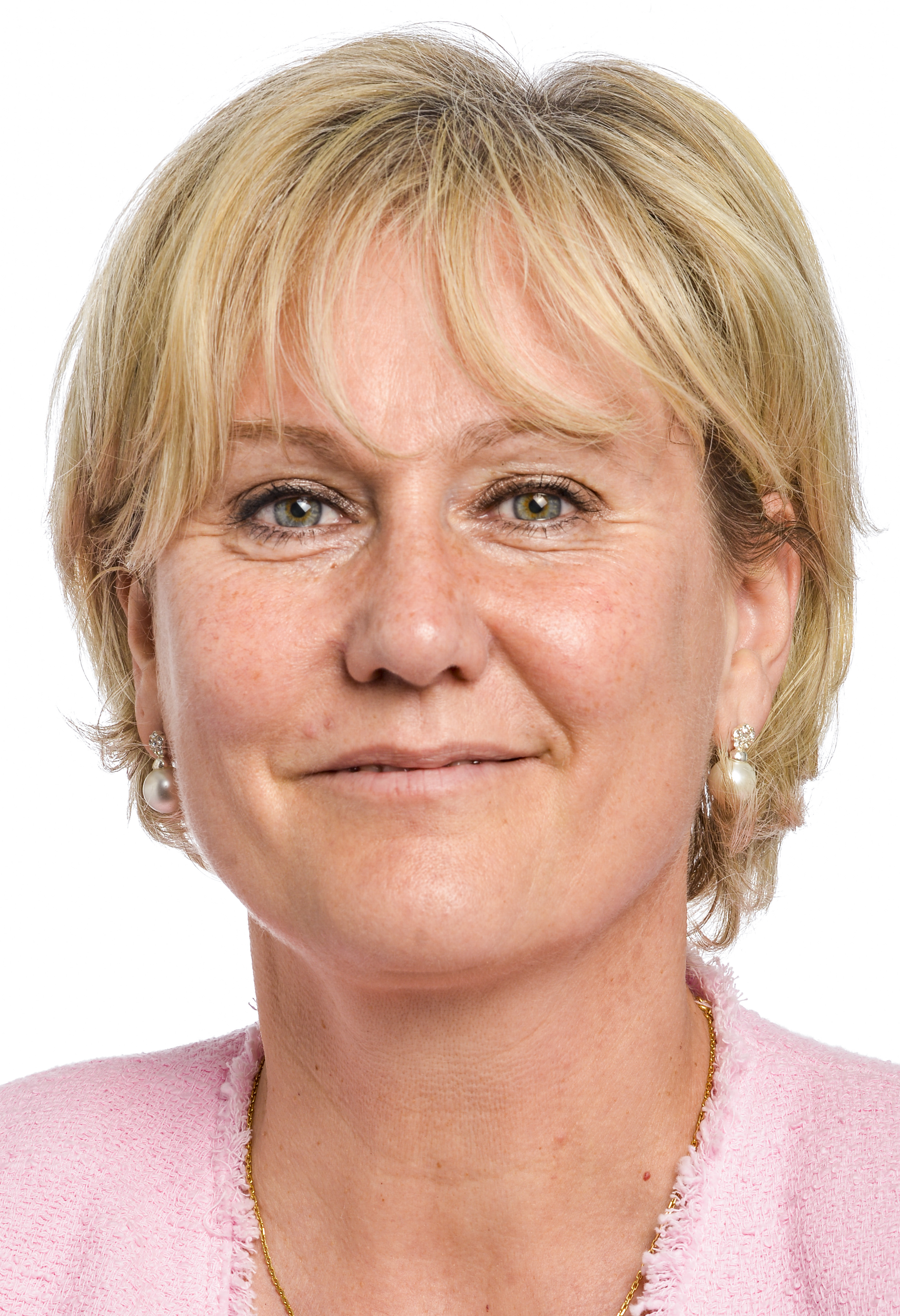
- Nadine Morano in 2014

Member of the European Parliament
- Incumbent
- Assumed office 1 July 2014
- Constituency: France

Minister for Apprenticeship and Professional Formation
- In office 14 November 2010 – 10 May 2012
- Prime Minister: François Fillon
- Preceded by: Nicole Péry
- Succeeded by: Thierry Repentin

Secretary of State in charge of the Family and the Solidarity
- In office 23 June 2009 – 13 November 2010
- Prime Minister: François Fillon
- Preceded by: Valérie Létard
- Succeeded by: Claude Greff

Secretary of State in charge of the Family
- In office 18 March 2008 – 23 June 2009
- Prime Minister: François Fillon
- Preceded by: Xavier Bertrand
- Succeeded by: herself

Member of the National Assembly for Meurthe-et-Moselle's 5th constituency
- In office 19 June 2002 – 19 April 2008
- Preceded by: Nicole Feidt
- Succeeded by: Philippe Morenvillier

Personal details
- Born: Nadine Yvonne Pucelle (changed to Nadine Yvonne Pugelle in 1976); 6 November 1963 (age 62) Nancy, Lorraine
- Party: LR (2015–present)
- Other political affiliations: RPR (1981–2002); UMP (2002–2015)
- Children: 3
- Education: University of Lorraine

Nadine Morano (Note: French pronunciation: [nadin mɔʁaˈno]) (née Pucelle; born 6 November 1963) is a French politician of the Republicans who has been serving as Member of the European Parliament since 2014. She was previously a member of the National Assembly, and a minister under François Fillon.

== Early life ==
Morano was born Nadine Yvonne Pucelle on 6 November 1963 in Nancy. Her father was a truck driver. Her mother, Monique Generelli, was a switchboard operator, daughter of a Piedmontese mason from Verbano-Cusio-Ossola. Her original last name was changed to Pugelle by a ministerial decree in 1976.

== Political career ==
Morano served as a member of the National Assembly from 2002 to 2008, representing Meurthe-et-Moselle. In parliament, she was a member of the Committee on Cultural Affairs (2002-2007) and the Defense Committee (2007-2008).

Morano served as the Deputy Minister for Apprenticeship and Vocational Training under the Minister of Labour, Employment and Health, Xavier Bertrand. She was previously Secretary of State for Family in the government of François Fillon on 18 March 2008.

=== Member of the European Parliament, 2014–present ===
Morano was elected Member of the European Parliament in the 2014 European elections, representing East France. She has since been serving on the Committee on Industry, Research and Energy. In addition to her committee assignments, she is a member of the Parliament's delegation for relations with the Pan-African Parliament (PAP).

Ahead of the 2015 French regional elections, the Republicans' chair Nicolas Sarkozy removed Morano – then considered one of his staunchest allies – from the party's list after she state that France was a "white race" country that must stay that way.

Later that year, Morano announced her intention to compete for a presidential nomination in the Republicans' primaries for the 2017 presidential elections. She later supported François Fillon as her party's candidate before urging him to withdraw his bid amid the so-called Fillon affair. In the Republicans' 2017 leadership election, she endorsed Laurent Wauquiez.

Ahead of the 2022 presidential elections, Morano publicly declared her support for Michel Barnier as the Republicans' candidate.

In 2023, the Republicans' chairman Éric Ciotti appointed Morano as member of his shadow cabinet and put her in charge of the party's immigration policies.

She was re-elected as an MEP following the 2024 European Parliament election in France.

== Controversy ==
Morano is a frequent user of social media whose outspoken style and running commentary are a frequent source of mockery. French daily Le Monde has created a web page, dubbed the "Moranator," that generates real phrases the politician has used and allows visitors to post them to their Twitter pages.

In September 2015, Morano quoted General Charles de Gaulle on On n'est pas couché, saying that "France is a Judeo-Christian country, of white race". This resulted in her removal as head of the Les Républicains (the former UMP) list for the regional elections in Meurthe-et-Moselle.

In 2019, Morano faced allegations of racism when she criticized the way government spokesperson Sibeth Ndiaye dressed as "circus clothes", adding that Ndiaye became a French citizen "only" three years before, "clearly with big gaps over French culture, unworthy of her government post". Gilles Le Gendre, who chaired the La République En Marche group in the National Assembly at the time, called on Morano to withdraw her comments and apologize or be prosecuted.

In 2020, Morano stated that French actress Aïssa Maïga, who was born in Senegal, should "go back to Africa" if she "was not happy with seeing so many white people in France".

== Recognition ==
On 6 November 2007, Morano was among the guests invited to the state dinner hosted by U.S. President George W. Bush in honor of President Nicolas Sarkozy at the White House.

== Personal life ==
Morano has been divorced; she has two sons and a daughter. One of her sons, Grégoire, died in July 2024 at the age of 33.
