= Meurthe-et-Moselle's 5th constituency =

Constituency of the National Assembly of France

5th constituency of Meurthe-et-Moselle
- inline Constituency of the National Assembly of France

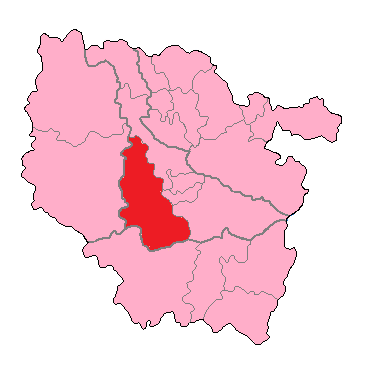
- Meurthe-et-Moselle's 5th Constituency shown within Lorraine
- Deputy: Dominique Potier; PS
- Department: Meurthe-et-Moselle
- Cantons: Colombey-les-Belles, Domèvre-en-Haye, Haroué, Neuves-Maisons, Thiaucourt-Regniéville (part), Toul-Nord, Toul-Sud, Vézelise.
- Registered voters: 76,718

The 5th constituency of Meurthe-et-Moselle is a French legislative constituency in the Meurthe-et-Moselle département.

== Description ==
Meurthe-et-Moselle's 5th Constituency consists of the south west portion of the department based around the small town of Toul, which lies on the river Moselle.

Historically the seat has swung between right and left leaning parties. Since 1988 it has had no fewer than six different representatives, changing hands at every election with the exception of 2007 and 2017. After the 2017 election it became the only seat held by the Socialist Party in the department.

In the 2022 election, incumbent PS deputy Dominique Potier distanced himself from the NUPES alliance, choosing to run as an independent left candidate. However, Potier rejoined the PS upon the start of the new term of the National Assembly.

== Historic Representation ==
Election	Member	Party
1986	Proportional representation – no election by constituency	
1988	Michel Dinet	PS
1993	Aloys Geoffroy	UDF
1997	Nicole Feidt	PS
2002	Nadine Morano	UMP
2007	Nadine Morano	UMP
2008	Nadine Morano	UMP
2012	Dominique Potier	PS
2017	Dominique Potier	PS
2022	Dominique Potier	DVG

== Election results ==
=== 2024 ===
Legislative Election 2024: Meurthe-et-Moselle's 5th constituency
Party	Candidate	Votes	%	±%
DVG	Dominique Potier	22,415	43.47	−0.5
LR (UXD)	Louis-Joseph Pecher	15,704	30.45	N/A
LR	Quentin Vinot*	7,220	14.00	+9.35
Party of France (EXD)	Pierre-Nicolas Nups	5,190	10.06	N/A
LO	Miriam Aubert	792	1.54	−0.64
DIV	Edouard Mathieu	792	0.47	N/A
Turnout		53,180	67.60	+19.22
2nd round result
DVG	Dominique Potier	28,073	54.73	+11.26
LR	Louis-Joseph Pecher	23217	45.27	+14.82
Turnout		51290	95.52	−1.44
Registered electors		78,674		
DVG hold		Swing		

* Vinot's result is counted against the previous result of the LR candidate in 2022

=== 2022 ===
Legislative Election 2022: Meurthe-et-Moselle's 5th constituency
Party	Candidate	Votes	%	±%
DVG	Dominique Potier*	16,393	43.97	+15.41
RN	Philippe Morenvillier	10,216	27.40	+8.90
LREM (Ensemble)	Marika Bret	5,268	14.13	−12.91
LR (UDC)	Yannick François	1,735	4.65	−5.85
REC	Julie Ricard	1,345	3.61	N/A
PA	Elisabeth Schilder	902	2.42	N/A
LO	Miriam Aubert	812	2.18	+1.58
Others	N/A	613	-	−
Turnout		37,284	48.38	−2.12
2nd round result
DVG	Dominique Potier*	21,782	63.12	−0.01
RN	Philippe Morenvillier	12,728	36.88	N/A
Turnout		34,510	46.07	+1.04
DVG gain from PS				

* In the absence of a PS candidate, Potier's result is counted against his previous result in swing calculations, despite his designation as DVG.

=== 2017 ===
Candidate	Label	First round		Second round	
Candidate	Label	Votes	%	Votes	%
Dominique Potier	PS	11,150	28.56	20,461	63.13
Marion Buchet	REM	10,558	27.04	11,951	36.87
Billy Winkens	FN	7,225	18.50		
Philippe Morenvillier	LR	4,098	10.50		
Rodolphe Bauer	FI	3,131	8.02		
Patrick Baranger	ECO	797	2.04		
Gilbert Canteri	DLF	739	1.89		
Jean-Philippe Roy-Moreau	EXD	423	1.08		
Lauranne Witt	PCF	409	1.05		
Gérard Neis	EXG	235	0.60		
Christiane Gelly	DIV	208	0.53		
Kévin Husson	DIV	74	0.19		
Votes		39,047	100.00	32,412	100.00
Valid votes		39,047	98.19	32,412	91.40
Blank votes		546	1.37	2,116	5.97
Null votes		175	0.44	933	2.63
Turnout		39,768	50.50	35,461	45.03
Abstentions		38,981	49.50	43,290	54.97
Registered voters		78,749		78,751	
Source: Ministry of the Interior

=== 2012 ===
Legislative Election 2012: Meurthe-et-Moselle's 5th constituency
Party	Candidate	Votes	%	±%
PS	Dominique Potier	18,056	39.29	
UMP	Nadine Morano	15,777	34.33	
FN	Olivier Prugneau	7,559	16.45	
FG	Annie Levi-Cyferman	1,518	3.30	
EELV	Jacqueline Fontaine	980	2.13	
MoDem	Hervé Brosseau	933	2.03	
Others	N/A	1,132		
Turnout		45,955	59.97	
2nd round result
PS	Dominique Potier	25,122	55.67	
UMP	Nadine Morano	20,006	44.33	
Turnout		45,128	58.82	
PS gain from UMP				

== Sources ==
Official results of French elections from 2002: "Résultats électoraux officiels en France" (in French).
