= Philippe Kemel =

French politician

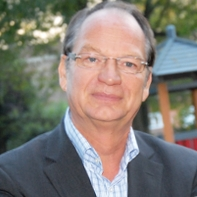

Member of the French National Assembly for Pas-de-Calais' 11th constituency
- In office 17 June 2012 – 18 June 2017
- Preceded by: Odette Duriez
- Succeeded by: Marine Le Pen

Mayor of Carvin
- Incumbent
- Assumed office 2001
- Preceded by: Odette Dauchet

Personal details
- Born: 28 June 1948 (age 78) Emmerin, France
- Party: Socialist Party
- Education: Charles de Gaulle University – Lille III

Philippe Kemel (born 28 June 1948) is a French politician who is the mayor of Carvin and a former member of the National Assembly of France. He is a member of the Socialist Party.

== Early life ==
Kemel was born in Emmerin, Nord.

Kemel completed his secondary education at Gondecourt High School and studied economics, sociology and accounting in Lille. An economist and sociologist by training, he teaches logistic economics at the University of Lille and also does accounting for companies.

== Political career ==
Kemel joined the Socialist Party in 1974 at the time of the first candidacy of François Mitterrand. He had been a member of the Unified Socialist Party.

Since 1977, Kemel has been a candidate on the municipal list in Carvin. He was elected to the union list of the left for the first time in 1983 and since then has been an elected official.

He was elected Mayor of Carvin at the 2001 municipal elections.

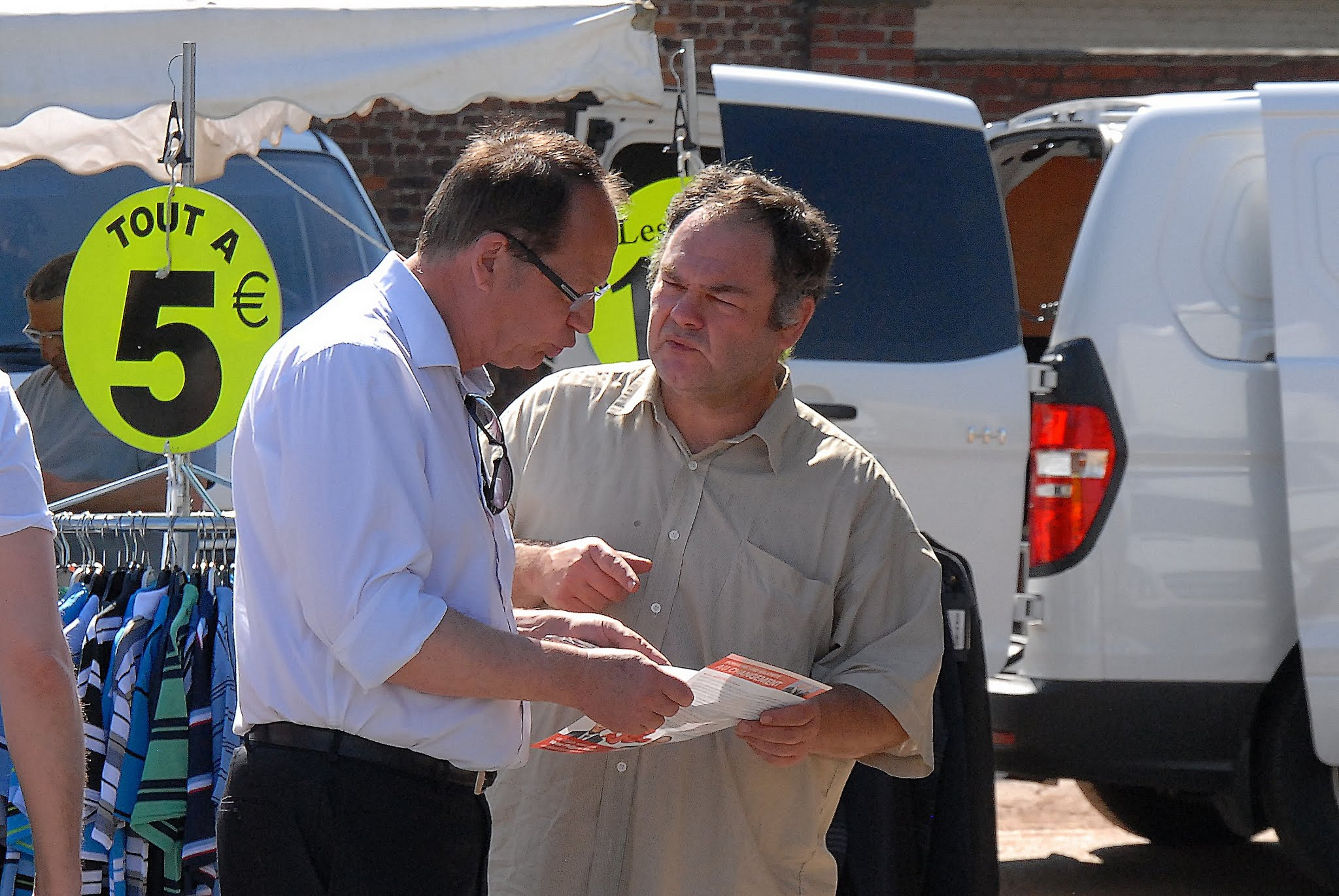
Kemel during the campaign of the legislative elections of 2012

He served on the Regional Council of Nord-Pas-de-Calais from 2000 to 2012, he is vice-president of high schools from 2004 and learning from 2010, chaired by Daniel Percheron.

Kemel stood for the Socialist Party in the 2012 French legislative election. He was elected MP on 17 June 2012 in Pas-de-Calais's 11th constituency, after a high-profile campaign where he beat Left Front Member of the European Parliament Jean-Luc Mélenchon in the first round and won a very slim victory of 118 votes over Marine Le Pen in the second round.

Kemel stood for re-election at the 2017 French legislative election but was defeated decisively in the first round, winning just 10% of votes. In the second round, his seat was won by Marine Le Pen.

Following the election of Jean-Pierre Corbisez in the Senate, he was nominated as a candidate to succeed him at the head of the agglomeration, following an internal vote in the majority group, but was defeated by Christophe Pilch.

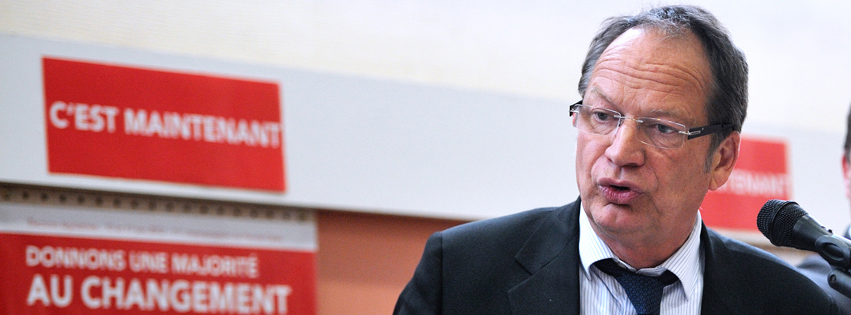
Kemel campaigning in 2012

== Mandates ==
- Mayor of Carvin since 19 March 2001
- Member of Parliament for the eleventh district of Pas-de-Calais from 20 June 2012 to 20 June 2017
- Vice-chairman of the Regional Council of Nord-Pas-de-Calais until December 2012.
