= Avi Assouly =

French-Israeli politician (1950–2025)

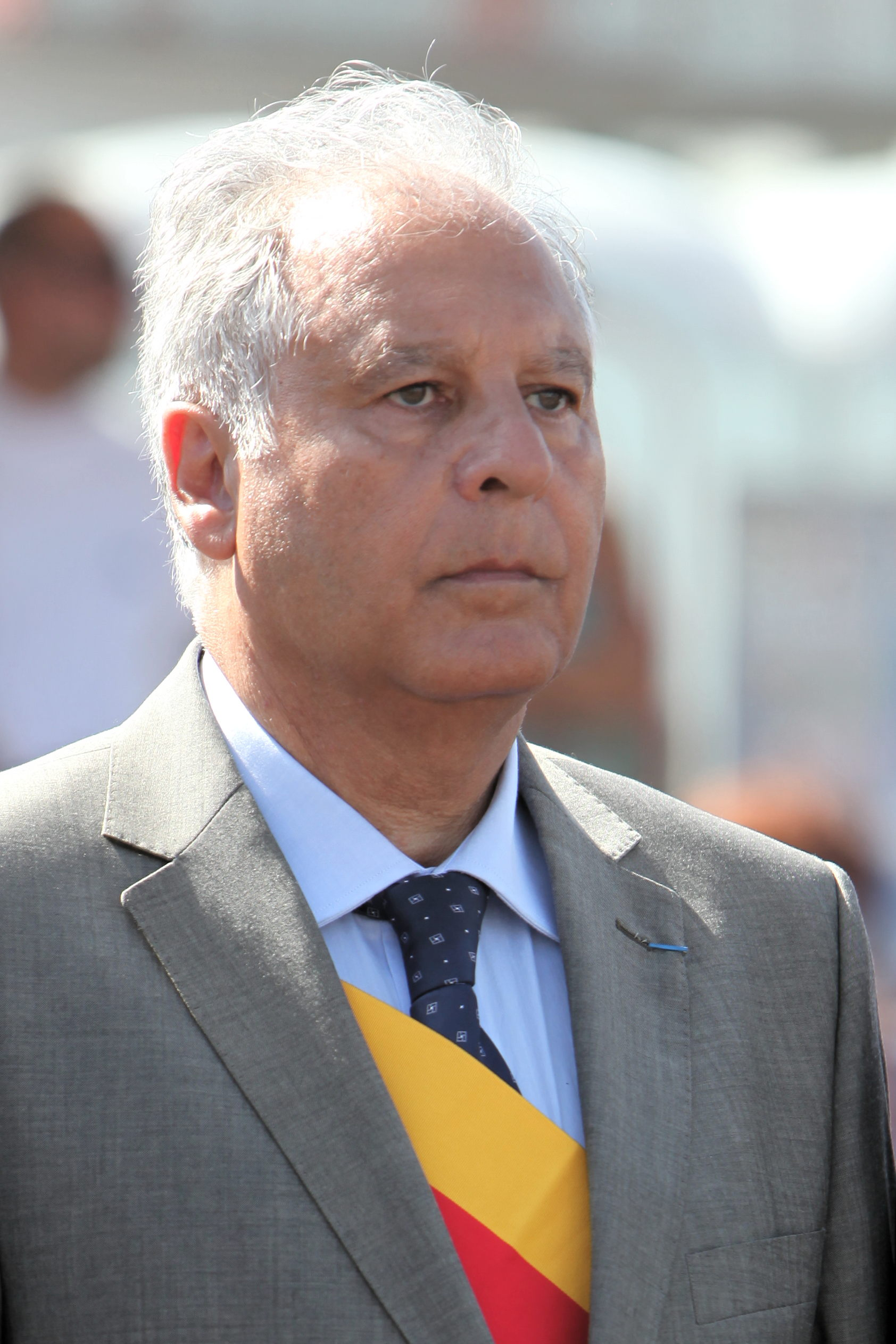
- Assouly in 2012

Deputy of the French National Assembly for Bouches-du-Rhône's 5th constituency
- In office 22 July 2012 – 2 May 2014
- Preceded by: Marie-Arlette Carlotti
- Succeeded by: Marie-Arlette Carlotti

Personal details
- Born: 5 June 1950 Aïn El Arbaa, French Algeria
- Died: 14 February 2025 (aged 74) Marseille, France
- Party: PS
- Occupation: Journalist

Avi Assouly (5 June 1950 – 14 February 2025) was a French-Israeli politician of the Socialist Party (PS).

== Life and career ==
Born in Aïn El Arbaa, in Colonial Algeria on 5 June 1950, Assouly played football for Racing Besançon of Division 2. He then joined the Israel Defense Forces and fought in the Yom Kippur War. He then worked for Israeli airline El Al in Paris, New York City, and Marseille.

Assouly became a sports journalist in 1984 for the magazine Crampons. He then joined Fun Radio, NRJ, and Red Star. In 1992, France Bleu Provence recruited him to commentate on Olympique de Marseille matches. On 5 May 1992, he was seriously injured in the Stade Armand-Cesari disaster. During this time, he also worked as a contributor for M6, La Chaîne Marseille, OM TV, Le Soir, The Sun, and Reuters. During the 2006–07 season, he prematurely announced the victory of Olympique de Marseille in a match against Mladá Boleslav, though the Czech club went on to win 4–2.

In January 2010, Assouly joined Michel Vauzelle as a PS candidate in the 2010 French regional elections despite not being a member of the party himself. He was elected to the Regional Council of Provence-Alpes-Côte d'Azur on the party list. In 2012, he was the substitute for Marie-Arlette Carlotti, who was elected to Bouches-du-Rhône's 5th constituency, defeating Renaud Muselier, before joining the Ayrault Cabinet II. He held the seat until 2 May 2014, when Carlotti returned to her seat. In 2022, he ran in Bouches-du-Rhône's 2nd constituency under the Ecology at the Centre, earning just 713 first round votes.

Assouly died in Marseille on 14 February 2025, at the age of 74.

== Awards ==
- Knight of the Ordre national du Mérite (1997)
- Bronze Medal of Youth, Sports and Community Involvement (1999)
- Honour Medal for Work Service
