= Jacques Nikonoff =

French economist

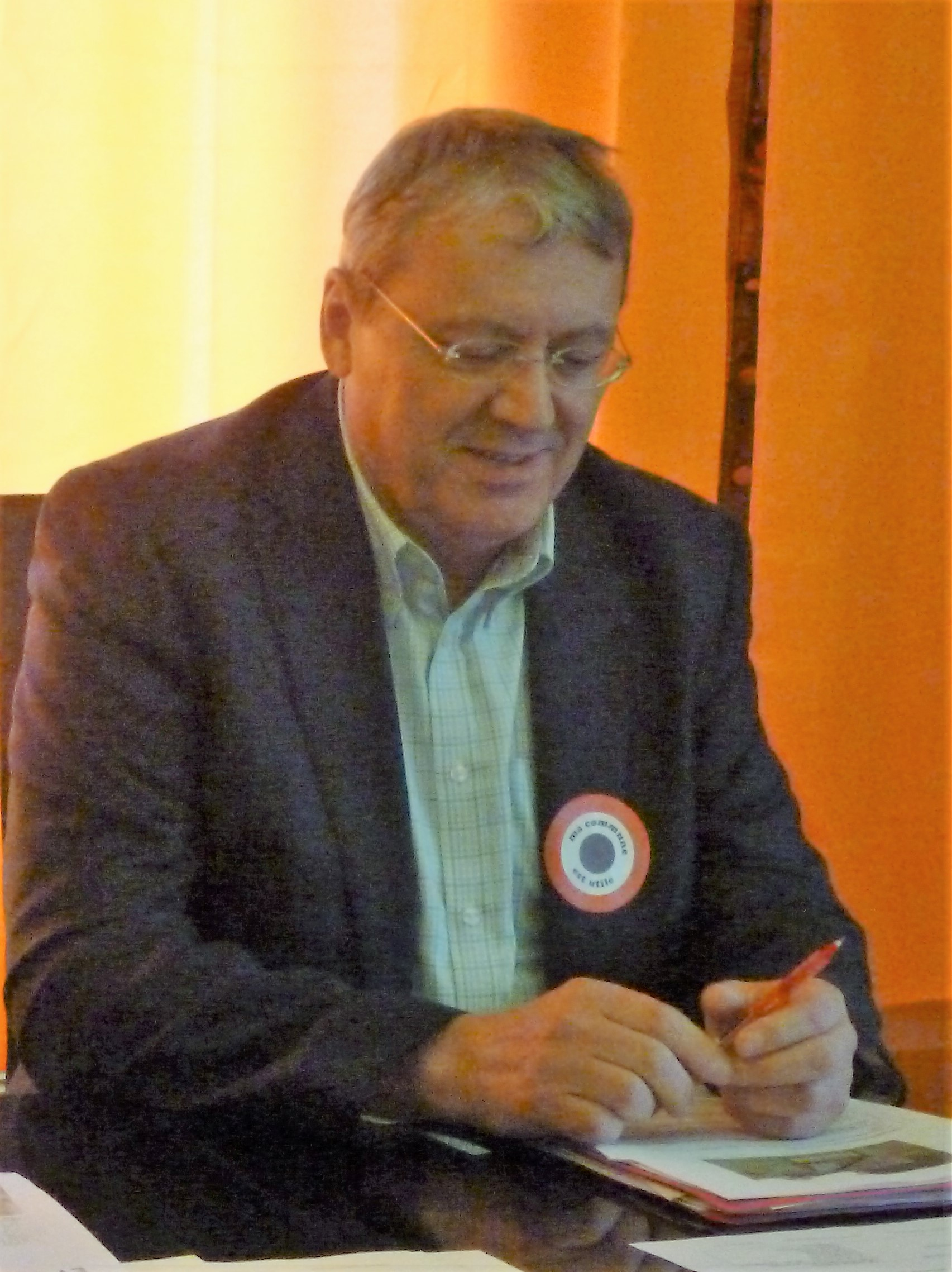
- Born: 27 January 1952 (age 74); Suresnes, France
- Organization(s): Un travail pour chacun (Work for everyone); Attac
- Political party: Parti de la Démondialisation (De-globalization Party)

Academic background
- Education: University of Vincennes in Saint-Denis; Paris Institute of Political Studies; École nationale d'administration Conservatoire national des arts et métiers

Jacques Nikonoff (born 1952) is a French economist and senior civil servant, active in anti-globalization and sovereigntism movements.

== Early life and education ==
Jacques Nikonoff was born on 27 January 1952 in Suresnes, Seine, France. His grandparents were Russian immigrants, while his parents were members of the French Communist Party. After completing his high school education, he worked as a welder at the Norton abrasive paper manufacturing factory, in La Courneuve.

During his time there, he joined the communist party (PCF) as well as the CGT communist union, whose ranks he rose until he was fired in 1981. During his time out of employment, Nikonoff studied educational sciences in the University of Vincennes in Saint-Denis, after passing the special exam for non-bachelor's degree holders. At the same time, he undertook formateur studies at the Conservatoire national des arts et métiers (Note: A formateur, in France, is the competent person who teaches new skills to adults.) and started working in the Aulnay-sous-Bois mayoral program for young people's social integration in the banlieues. He also studied works of literature, history, and politics. After the election of UMP member Jean-Claude Abrioux as mayor, Nikonoff was fired. He continued his studies at the Paris Institute of Political Studies and, in 1984, passed the entrance exam for the École nationale d'administration, upon which time, he resigned from the PCF.

== Academic and civil service career ==
After completing his academic studies, Nikonoff joined the Caisse des dépôts et consignations, the Deposits and Consignments Fund of the French state. He represented the fund in the United States as a financial attaché to the U.S. Treasury.

== Political career ==
In 1993, Nokonoff creates the movement Un Travail pour Chacun or UTC (Work for Everyone), which prioritizes the mobilization against unemployment. The

In 1999, Robert Hue, the general secretary of the communist party, invites back Nikonoff who serves, between 1999 and 2001, in the direction of the PCF. He will leave a few years later, in 2004, to lead Attac or Association pour la Taxation des Transactions financières et pour l'Action Citoyenne (Association for the Taxation of Financial Transactions and Citizen's Action), (Note: Attac started as a pressure group with the aim of having a Tobin tax legislated. The economist himself denounced the group's use of his name, stating he opposes their aims. Eventually, Attac gravitated towards the demand for France to regain its fiscal and monetary sovereignty.) though he will continue to participate in various party events about the economy and France's part in the European Community. Nikonoff leaves Attac in 2006.

In a May 2005 article in Le Monde, he advocates for a new structure of European unification, rejecting EU's current structure and the course undertaken, and suggests that only France & Germany, along with the Benelux countries aim at a "true unification." In the same article, he denounced the "Atlanticist" tendency of most new EU members and the Union itself.

In 2008, at the initiative of Nikonoff and militants and activists of the French left and anti-globalization movements, the Mouvement politique d’éducation populaire or M'PEP ("Political Movement for the People's Education") is created, a "non-political", "grass roots" organization, which, nonetheless, endorses electorally the Left Front.

== Discourse on the Eurozone and the European Union ==
The initiatives of both Attac and M'PEP have been denounced by sections of the Left as utopian reformism with "false solutions."

As Marxist economist Costas Lapavitsas, supporting Grexit during his country's government-debt crisis, argued that without an exit from the Eurozone Greece cannot aspire to an economic recovery or the elimination of its debt burden, Nikonoff proclaimed that France too should exit the Eurozone since the common currency has "demonstrably" failed as a "shield" against speculation and as the proclaimed "almost miraculous means" of overcoming inflation, unemployment, recession, and so on. Marxist economist Michel Husson, professor of Economics at the University of Greenwich, denounced both the notion of Grexit as a cure-all for the Greek crisis, and, more importantly, the view that, in general, "leaving the Euro could in itself improve the relationship of forces in favor of the workers," characterizing it as "a fundamental error of analysis."

In January 2017, a few months before the presidential election, Marine LePen, leader of the far-right National Rally party, declared that France should leave the Eurozone, though without leaving the European Union. Nikonoff commented on LePen's position by highlighting the "significant" differences of his proposals, as already presented in his booklet La confrontation: argumentaire anti-FN (The Confrontation: Anti-NF (Note: At the time, the National Rally party was still named National Front.) Argument).

== Personal life ==
Nikonoff is married and has three children.

== See also ==
- Jean-Luc Mélenchon
- Exit from the Eurozone
- Exit from the European Union
- Brexit
- Grexit
- Job guarantee
