= Fanélie Carrey-Conte =

French politician (born 1980)

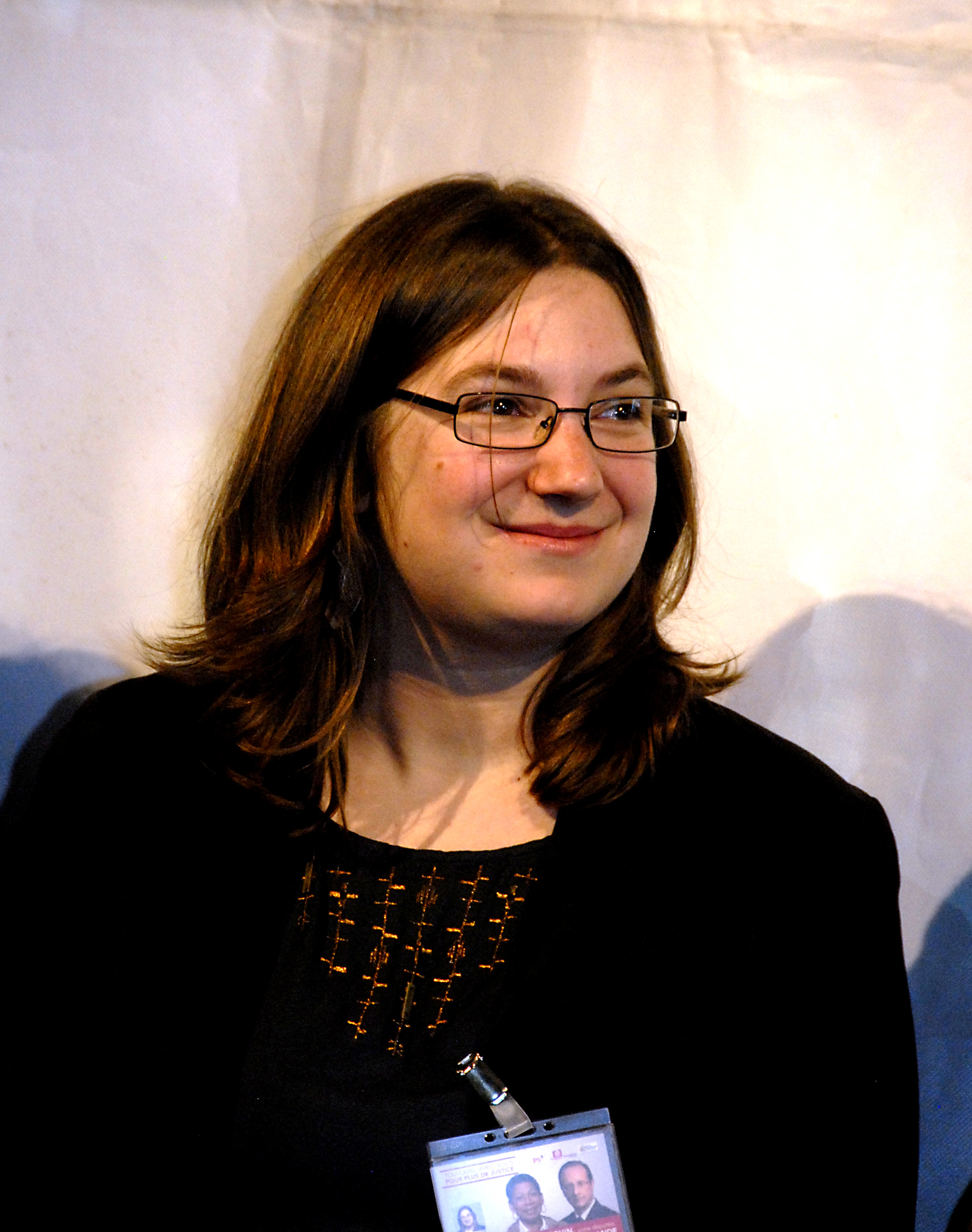
- Carrey-Conte in 2012

Member of the French National Assembly for Paris's 15th constituency
- In office 22 July 2012 – 30 September 2016
- Preceded by: George Pau-Langevin
- Succeeded by: George Pau-Langevin

Personal details
- Born: 16 May 1980 (age 45)
- Party: Socialist Party

Fanélie Carrey-Conte (born 16 May 1980) is a French politician serving as a secretary general of the Cimade since 2021. From 2012 to 2016, she was a member of the National Assembly.
