= Marcel Cabiddu =

French politician

Member of the National Assembly for the 11th district of Pas-de-Calais
- In office 1 June 1997 – 13 January 2004
- Preceded by: Rémy Auchedé
- Succeeded by: Odette Duriez

Personal details
- Born: 10 February 1952 Wingles, France
- Died: 13 January 2004 (aged 51) Wingles, France
- Party: Socialist Party

Marcel Cabiddu (10 February 1952 – 13 January 2004) was a French politician.

== Political career ==
Cabiddu was voted as member of parliament during the 2002 French legislative election in the 11th district of Pas-de-Calais. He was a member of the Socialist Party. Struggling with diabetes which affected him heavily, he took his own life in January 2004. He was replaced on 20 January 2004 by Odette Duriez.

== Positions ==
- 20 March 1977 to 12 March 1983 - deputy mayor of Wingles, Pas-de-Calais
- 21 March 1982 to 1 October 1988 - member of the departmental council of Pas-de-Calais
- 14 March 1983 to 12 March 1989 - mayor of Wingles
- 2 October 1988 to 27 March 1994 - member of the departmental council of Pas-de-Calais
- 20 March 1989 to 18 June 1995 - mayor of Wingles
- 27 March 1994 to 18 March 2001 - member of the departmental council of Pas-de-Calais
- 27 March 1994 to 26 March 1998 - vice-president of the departmental council of Pas-de-Calais
- 25 June 1995 to 18 March 2001 - mayor of Wingles
- 1 June 1997 to 18 June 2002 - deputy of Pas-de-Calais
- 27 March 1998 to 18 March 2001 - vice-president of the departmental council of Pas-de-Calais
- 18 March 2001 to 13 January 2004 - mayor of Wingles (replaced by Gérard Dassonvalle, his deputy)
- 18 June 2002 to 13 January 2004 - deputy of Pas-de-Calais

== Legacy ==
A park in the east of Wingles is named after Cabiddu.
