= Paris's 21st constituency (1988–2012) =

Constituency of the French Fifth Republic

21st constituency of Paris
- inline Constituency of the National Assembly of France

- Paris, showing its legislative constituencies between 1988 and 2012
- Member: constituency abolished, 2012
- Department: Paris

Paris's 21st constituency was one of the 21 French National Assembly constituencies in the Paris department in the period 1988 to 2012.

It was created by the 1986 redistricting of French legislative constituencies, which ended the proportional representation used in the 1986 election. The constituency covered three districts of the 20th arrondissement: Charonne, Saint-Fargeau and part of Père-Lachaise located to the south of a line defined by the axis of avenue Gambetta, rue de la Bidassoa and rue Villiers-de-L'Isle-Adam.

It was abolished in the 2010 redistricting of French legislative constituencies, which reduced the number of constituencies in Paris to 18. Most of the area of the 1988-2012 21st constituency moved to the new fifteenth constituency, ceding part of the Père-Lachaise and Charonne districts respectively to the new sixth and eighth constituencies.

== Description ==
After the 1986 French legislative election, the new prime minister Jacques Chirac re-established the two-round single-member district electoral system. The number of deputies from Paris was maintained at 21 and the previous (pre-1986) electoral constituencies were therefore reduced from 31 to 21. three districts of the 20th arrondissement: Charonne, Saint-Fargeau and part of Père-Lachaise located to the south of a line defined by the axis of avenue Gambetta, rue de la Bidassoa and rue Villiers-de-L'Isle-Adam.

In 1999, the Institut national de la statistique et des études économiques estimated the population of the constituency as 125 393 inhabitants.

== Members ==
- Michel Charzat (1986 to 1993)
- Didier Bariani (1993 to 1997)
- Véronique Carrion-Bastok (1997 to 1999)
- Michel Charzat (1999 to 2007)
- George Pau-Langevin (2007 to 2012)
