= Philippe Morenvillier =

French politician

Philippe Morenvillier (born December 6, 1965, in Nancy) is a French politician, former member of the National Assembly of France. He represented the Meurthe-et-Moselle department, as a member of the Union for a Popular Movement.

== Biography ==
He joined the party Debout la France in April 2019, explaining his departure from les Republicans by the refusal of Nadine Morano to support him during the general elections and believing that the party became "a drunken boat, left by the figureheads". After a short period as National Delegate to Small and Medium Enterprises, he resigned and decided to support Marine le Pen and joined the circle of the National Rally.
