= Odette Duriez =

French politician (born 1948)

Departmental Councilor of Pas-de-Calais
- Incumbent
- Assumed office 29 March 2015
- Constituency: Canton de Douvrin

Mayor of Cambrin
- In office 20 March 1989 – 29 March 2014

Senator of Pas-de-Calais
- In office 1 October 2011 – 28 February 2013
- Succeeded by: Hervé Poher

Member of the National Assembly
- In office 14 January 2004 – 30 September 2011
- Preceded by: Marcel Cabiddu
- Succeeded by: Philippe Kemel
- Constituency: 11th of Pas-de-Calais

Personal details
- Born: 7 May 1948 (age 77) Merville, France
- Party: PS
- Occupation: Accountant

Odette Duriez (born 7 May 1948 in Merville, Nord) is a French politician who is a former member of the National Assembly of France. She represents the Pas-de-Calais department, and is a member of the Socialist Party.
