= Meurthe-et-Moselle's 3rd constituency =

Constituency of the National Assembly of France

3rd constituency of Meurthe-et-Moselle
- inline Constituency of the National Assembly of France

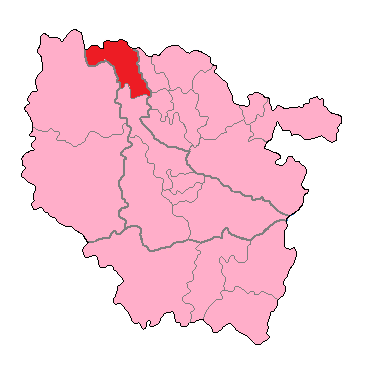
- Meurthe-et-Moselle's 3rd Constituency shown within Lorraine
- Deputy: Martine Etienne; LFI
- Department: Meurthe-et-Moselle
- Cantons: Audun-le-Roman, Briey, Herserange, Longuyon, Longwy, Mont-Saint-Martin, Villerupt
- Registered voters: 83,073

The 3rd constituency of Meurthe-et-Moselle is a French legislative constituency in the Meurthe-et-Moselle département.

== Description ==
Meurthe-et-Moselle's 3rd constituency was radically altered prior to the 2012 elections so that it no longer contains any of the territory of the previous incarnation, which consisted of the cantons of Laxou, Nancy-Ouest et Pompey. The new version covers the northernmost areas of Meurthe-et-Moselle up to the border with Luxembourg and Belgium.

The seat was won comfortably by the Socialist Party candidate Christian Eckert in a second round run off against the UMP in 2012.

== Historic Representation ==
Election	Member	Party
1986	Proportional representation – no election by constituency	
1988	Claude Gaillardt	UDF
1993	Claude Gaillardt	UDF
1997	Claude Gaillardt	UDF
2002	Claude Gaillardt	UMP
2007	Valérie Rosso-Debord	UMP
2012	Christian Eckert	PS
2017	Xavier Paluszkiewicz	LREM
2022	Martine Etienne	LFI

== Election results ==
=== 2024 ===
Legislative Election 2024: Meurthe-et-Moselle's 3rd constituency
Party	Candidate	Votes	%	±%
LFI (NFP)	Martine Etienne	13,068	28.49	+3.61
LR	Mathieu Servagi	3,599	7.85	+1.71
LO	Xavier Boury	1,022	2.23	N/A
RN	Frédéric Weber	19,938	43.46	19.55
RE (Ensemble)	Valérie Maurice	8,248	17.98	−7.18
Turnout		45875	97.32	59.99
Registered electors		80,382		
2nd round result
RN	Frédéric Weber	23,252	53.63	+9.84
LFI	Martine Etienne	20,104	46.37	17.88
Turnout		43356	91.09	−6.23
Registered electors		80,358		
RN gain from LFI				

=== 2022 ===
Legislative Election 2022: Meurthe-et-Moselle's 3rd constituency
Party	Candidate	Votes	%	±%
LREM (Ensemble)	Xavier Paluszkiewicz	7,429	25.16	-7.07
LFI (NUPÉS)	Martine Etienne	7,345	24.88	-11.09
RN	Muriel Di Rezze	7,061	23.92	+10.59
PS	Francis Herbays*	2,690	9.11	N/A
LR (UDC)	Mathieu Servagi	1,814	6.14	−3.16
REC	Nicolas Rosskopf	1,255	4.25	N/A
DVE	Véronique Foltz	807	2.73	N/A
Others	N/A	1,121	-	−
Turnout		29,522	37.33	−1.65
2nd round result
LFI (NUPÉS)	Martine Etienne	13,886	51.94	+4.35
LREM (Ensemble)	Xavier Paluszkiewicz	12,851	48.06	−4.35
Turnout		26,737	35.89	+0.86
LFI gain from LREM				

* Herbays stood as a dissident PS member, without the support of the party or the NUPES alliance. The 2017 PS result is counted with NUPES for swing calculations.

=== 2017 ===
Candidate	Label	First round		Second round	
Candidate	Label	Votes	%	Votes	%
Xavier Paluszkiewicz	REM	10,123	32.23	13,917	52.41
Patrice Zolfo	FI	4,997	15.91	12,636	47.59
Céline Dolcemascolo	FN	4,558	14.51		
Christian Eckert	PS	2,990	9.52		
Mathieu Servagi	LR	2,921	9.30		
Jean-Marc Leon	PCF	2,569	8.18		
Mikaël Agopiantz	ECO	741	2.36		
Arnaud Le Nenan	DVD	690	2.20		
Sonia Sadoune	DVD	474	1.51		
Christiane Vautrin	DLF	411	1.31		
Annick Jolivet	EXG	244	0.78		
Cécile Girardet	DIV	242	0.77		
Walter Di Luigi	DIV	187	0.60		
Pierre Lux	EXG	136	0.43		
Didier Suardi	DVD	123	0.39		
Votes		31,406	100.00	26,553	100.00
Valid votes		31,406	97.87	26,553	91.78
Blank votes		477	1.49	1,606	5.55
Null votes		205	0.64	772	2.67
Turnout		32,088	38.98	28,931	35.03
Abstentions		50,221	61.02	53,649	64.97
Registered voters		82,309		82,580	
Source: Ministry of the Interior

=== 2012 ===
Legislative Election 2012: Meurthe-et-Moselle's 3rd constituency
Party	Candidate	Votes	%	±%
PS	Christian Eckert	16,256	39.53	
UMP	Etienne Mangeot	7,720	18.77	
FG	Serge De Carli	7,555	18.37	
FN	Audrey Iozzo	6,280	15.27	
PRV	Véronique Guillotin	1,286	3.13	
Others	N/A	2,031		
Turnout		41,128	49.50	
2nd round result
PS	Christian Eckert	24,780	66.38	
UMP	Etienne Mangeot	12,552	33.62	
Turnout		37,332	44.91	
PS gain from UMP				

== Sources ==
Official results of French elections from 2002: "Résultats électoraux officiels en France" (in French).
