= Bernard Cazeneuve =

Prime Minister of France from 2016 to 2017

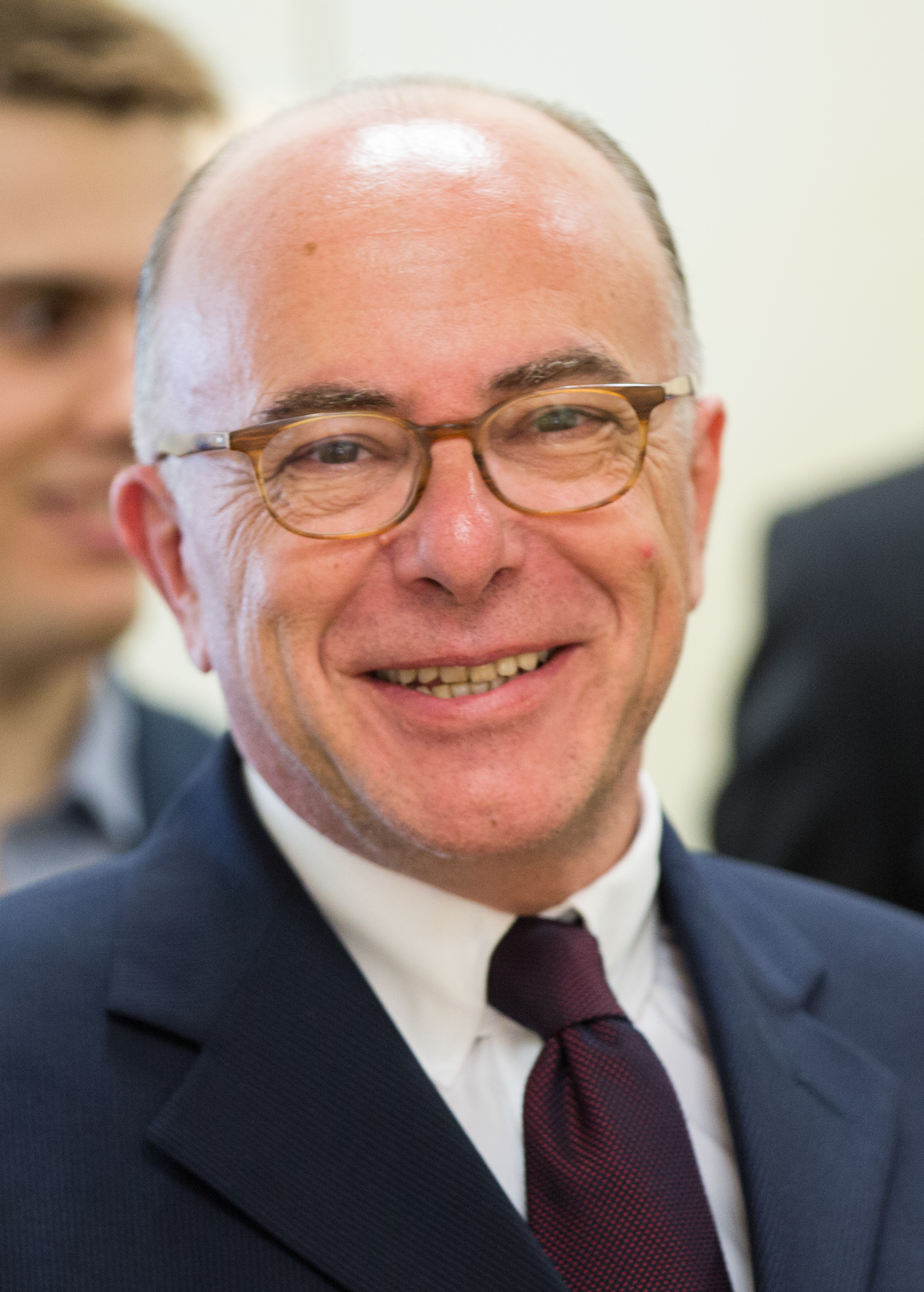
- Cazeneuve in 2018

Prime Minister of France
- In office 6 December 2016 – 15 May 2017
- President: François Hollande
- Preceded by: Manuel Valls
- Succeeded by: Édouard Philippe

Minister of the Interior
- In office 2 April 2014 – 6 December 2016
- Prime Minister: Manuel Valls
- Preceded by: Manuel Valls
- Succeeded by: Bruno Le Roux

Minister Delegate for the Budget
- In office 19 March 2013 – 2 April 2014
- Prime Minister: Jean-Marc Ayrault
- Preceded by: Jérôme Cahuzac
- Succeeded by: Christian Eckert

Minister Delegate for European Affairs
- In office 16 May 2012 – 19 March 2013
- Prime Minister: Jean-Marc Ayrault
- Preceded by: Jean Leonetti
- Succeeded by: Thierry Repentin

Member of the National Assembly
- In office 16 June 2017 – 20 June 2017
- Preceded by: Geneviève Gosselin-Fleury
- Succeeded by: Sonia Krimi
- Constituency: Manche's 4th constituency
- In office 20 June 2012 – 21 July 2012
- Preceded by: Claude Gatignol
- Succeeded by: Geneviève Gosselin-Fleury
- Constituency: Manche's 4th constituency
- In office 20 June 2007 – 16 June 2012
- Preceded by: Jean Lemière
- Succeeded by: Constituency abolished
- Constituency: Manche's 5th constituency
- In office 12 June 1997 – 18 June 2002
- Preceded by: Yves Bonnet
- Succeeded by: Jean Lemière
- Constituency: Manche's 5th constituency

Mayor of Cherbourg-Octeville
- In office 19 March 2001 – 23 June 2012
- Preceded by: Jean-Pierre Godefroy
- Succeeded by: Jean-Michel Houllegate

Mayor of Octeville
- In office 25 June 1995 – 14 March 2000
- Preceded by: André Poirier
- Succeeded by: Jean-Pierre Godefroy (Mayor of Cherbourg-Octeville)

Departmental Councillor of Manche
- In office 27 March 1994 – 28 January 1998
- President: Pierre Aguiton
- Constituency: Canton of Cherbourg-Octeville-Sud-Ouest

Personal details
- Born: Bernard Guy Georges Cazeneuve; 2 June 1963 (age 63) Senlis, France
- Party: La Convention (2023–present)
- Other political affiliations: MRG (1985–1987); PS (1987–2022)
- Spouse: Véronique Beau (m. 1995; div. 2012) (m. 2015; died 2024)
- Children: 2
- Education: Institut d'études politiques de Bordeaux
- Occupation: Jurist • Lawyer • Politician

Bernard Guy Georges Cazeneuve (French: [bɛʁnaʁ kaznœv]; born 2 June 1963) is a French politician and lawyer who served as Prime Minister of France from 6 December 2016 to 15 May 2017. He represented Manche's 5th constituency in the National Assembly from 1997 to 2002 and again from 2007 to 2012, in addition to the department's 4th constituency briefly in 2012 and 2017. For most of his political career, he was a member of the centre-left Socialist Party, but quit in 2022 after disagreeing with the party's decision to join an electoral coalition agreement that included the leftist La France Insoumise.

He was Mayor of Cherbourg-Octeville from 2001 to 2012. In 2012, he was appointed Minister Delegate for European Affairs in the Ayrault government. A year later, Cazeneuve was named Minister Delegate for the Budget after the resignation of Jérôme Cahuzac. In 2014, he was appointed Minister of the Interior in the First Valls government, a role he retained with the formation of the Second Valls government. In 2016, Cazeneuve was appointed prime minister by President François Hollande, after Manuel Valls resigned to concentrate on his candidacy for the 2017 presidential election. Following the election of Emmanuel Macron as President of the French Republic, Cazeneuve resigned from office and returned to private practice. During the 2024 French political crisis, Cazeneueve was reported to be the front-runner candidate for Prime Minister but was ultimately passed over in favor of Michel Barnier.

== Education and private career ==
Bernard Cazeneuve was born on 2 June 1963 in Senlis, Oise. His father was the head of the Socialist Party in Oise, which gave him the opportunity to attend a meeting with François Mitterrand. During his studies at the Institut d'études politiques de Bordeaux, he led the Young Radicals of the Left movement in the Gironde department. After graduating from the IEP de Bordeaux, he joined the Socialist Party.

Cazeneuve began his career as a legal adviser in Groupe Banque Populaire, before starting in politics. In 1991, he became a councillor in the cabinet of Thierry de Beaucé, Secretary of State for International Cultural Relations, then in 1992, Principal Private Secretary for Secretary of State for Foreign Affairs Alain Vivien. In 1993, he was appointed Principal Private Secretary in the cabinet of Charles Josselin, Secretary of State for the Sea. That same year, he was named Secretary General of the Council on Boating and Nautical Sports.

== Early political career ==
=== Member of the National Assembly for Manche ===
==== First term (1997–2002) ====
Rising in the Socialist Party, Cazeneuve moved in 1994 to Octeville in Manche department to put an end to local divisions in party politics, which had led to a loss of the mayor's office in 1989. That same year, he was elected General Councillor. He held the position in the Manche department from 1994 to 1998. He was later elected mayor of Octeville where he served from 1995 to 2000. In 1997, he was elected to the National Assembly representing the 5th constituency of Manche, campaigning on the issue of a "Greater Cherbourg", which would combine the six communes of the Cherbourg urban agglomeration. This issue went to referendum; it led to the combination of two communes, Cherbourg and Octeville.

==== Second term (2007–2012) ====
In 2007, Cazeneuve represented the Socialist Party in the legislative election for the 5th Constituency of Manche, defeating UMP candidate Jean Lemière with 58.96% of the vote. After this victory he resigned from his position with the Regional Council of Lower Normandy. Then, facing divided opposition from the right in the 2008 municipal elections, he retained his position as mayor of Cherbourg-Octeville. In his second term as mayor, he campaigned to promote the maritime character of the city, organising a nautical festival that featured an international sailing competition. He also focused on urban renewal of the Bassins and Provinces quarters of Cherbourg-Octeville, bringing together commercial and cultural projects.

On the national level, he represented the victims of the 2002 Karachi bus bombing, who were mostly from Cotentin, against their employer DCNS. As Secretary of the Commission on National Defense in the National Assembly, he was recorder between November 2009 and May 2010 of the Parliamentary inquiry into the Karachi attack. Due to the lack of government transparency regarding the Karachi case, Cazeneuve wrote a book titled Karachi, the impossible investigation.

After supporting no candidate in the 2011 Socialist Party presidential primary, he was named as one of candidate François Hollande's four spokespersons. He spoke to the media on issues related to industry and nuclear power, particularly the latter due to his role in not postponing the construction of a new reactor at the Flamanville Nuclear Power Plant and the reprocessing of nuclear waste at the La Hague site.

=== Mayor of Cherbourg-Octeville ===
Cazeneuve was elected to head the new commune of Cherbourg-Octeville in 2001, succeeding Jean-Pierre Godefroy and defeating the Rally for the Republic (RPR) candidate Jean Lemière. His political ascent was interrupted by a defeat for reelection to his seat in the National Assembly in the 2002 elections.

At the same time, he pursued a judicial career, being named a judge to the High Court and Cour de Justice de la République during his term as a member of the National Assembly. He was called to the bar of Cherbourg-Octeville in 2003.

In 2004, François Hollande convinced Cazeneuve to join the Socialist Party electoral list for the 2004 regional elections, representing the Manche department in the Regional Council of Lower Normandy, after Jean-Pierre Godefroy withdrew from consideration. His strong favour for nuclear energy, particularly the construction of a new nuclear reactor on the Cotentin, caused a rift between the Socialist Party and The Greens, who allied with the Radical Party of the Left in the first round of the regional election. After the victory of the Socialist Party, led by Philippe Duron, Cazeneuve was appointed first Vice-President of the Regional Council and President of the Regional Norman Tourism Committee, comprising the regions of Upper and Lower Normandy.

In 2005 he supported the "no" vote on the Treaty establishing a Constitution for Europe. Between 2006 and 2008 Cazeneuve worked for a Paris law firm, August & Debouzy, in their "Public, Regulation, and Competition" practice.

== Presidency of François Hollande ==
=== Minister Delegate for European Affairs ===
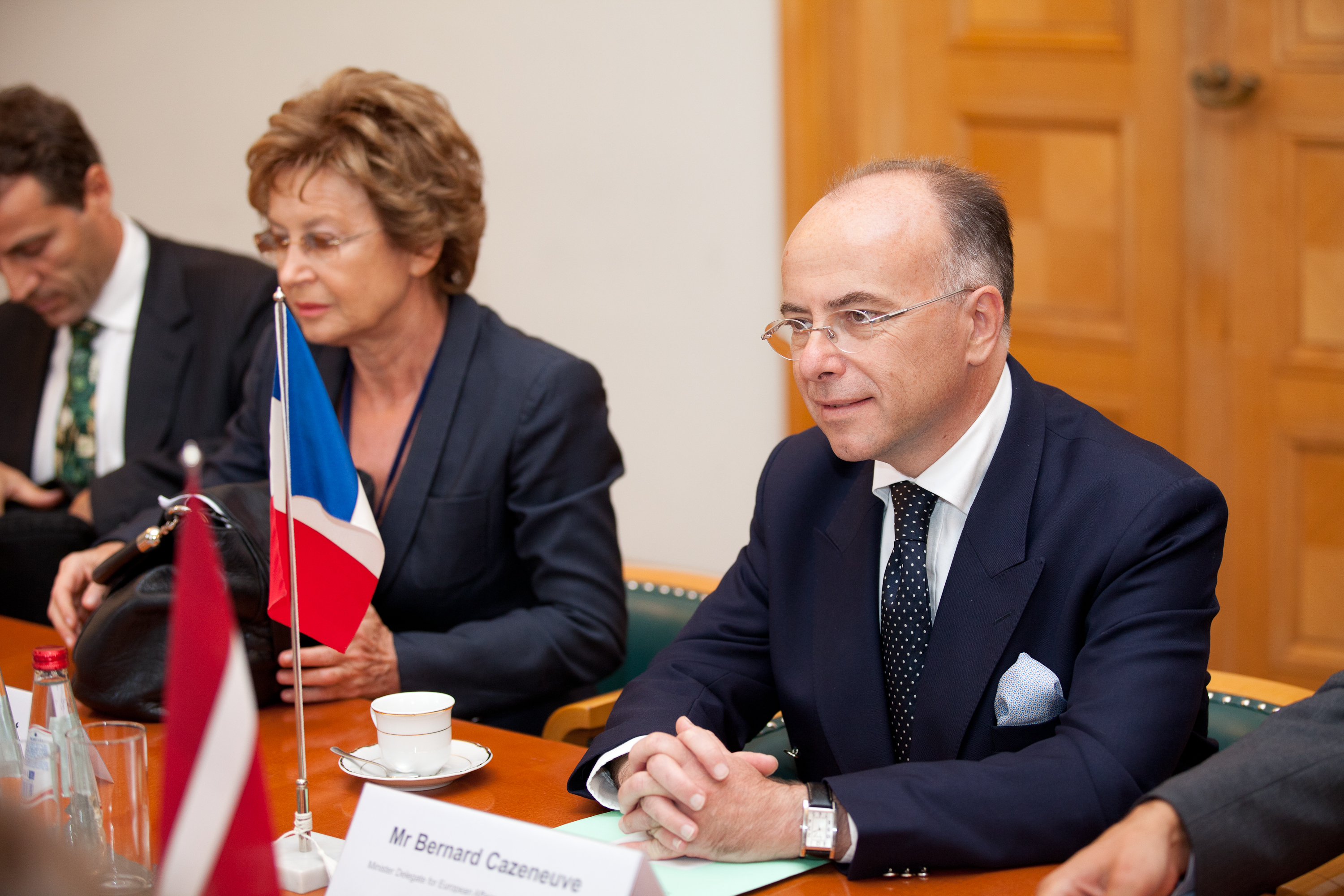
Cazeneuve in Latvia, 2012

Mentioned as a potential minister, notably for the Defense portfolio, he was named on 16 May 2012 as Minister Delegate for European Affairs, serving under Laurent Fabius in the Ministry of Foreign Affairs.

In the 2012 legislative elections he was re-elected to the National Assembly in the newly redrawn 4th Constituency of Manche, with Geneviève Gosselin, the deputy mayor of Cherbourg-Octeville, as his alternate. He won the election in June with 55.39% of the vote, but had to resign to assume his post in the new government, leading to Gosselin becoming the new deputy to the National Assembly. He also resigned as mayor of Cherbourg-Octeville, with the position being taken by Jean-Michel Houllegatte. As minister, he was tasked with defending the 2012 European Fiscal Compact to Socialist deputies in the National Assembly.

=== Minister Delegate for the Budget ===
On 19 March 2013, he was named Minister Delegate for the Budget after the resignation of Jérôme Cahuzac, who was accused of fraud. He was replaced as Junior Minister for European Affairs by Thierry Repentin, formerly Minister of State for Professional Training and Apprenticeship. He affirmed a policy of reducing the deficit to save 5 billion euros from the national budget for 2014. He intervened personally in the National Assembly to bury an amendment enlarging the tax base for a proposed tax on transactions for high frequency trading, one of François Hollande's campaign promises. He also proposed an amendment to increase the value added tax on equestrian activities from 7% to 20%, called the "equitax", which encountered strong opposition from professionals and amateurs in the equestrian world.

=== Minister of the Interior ===
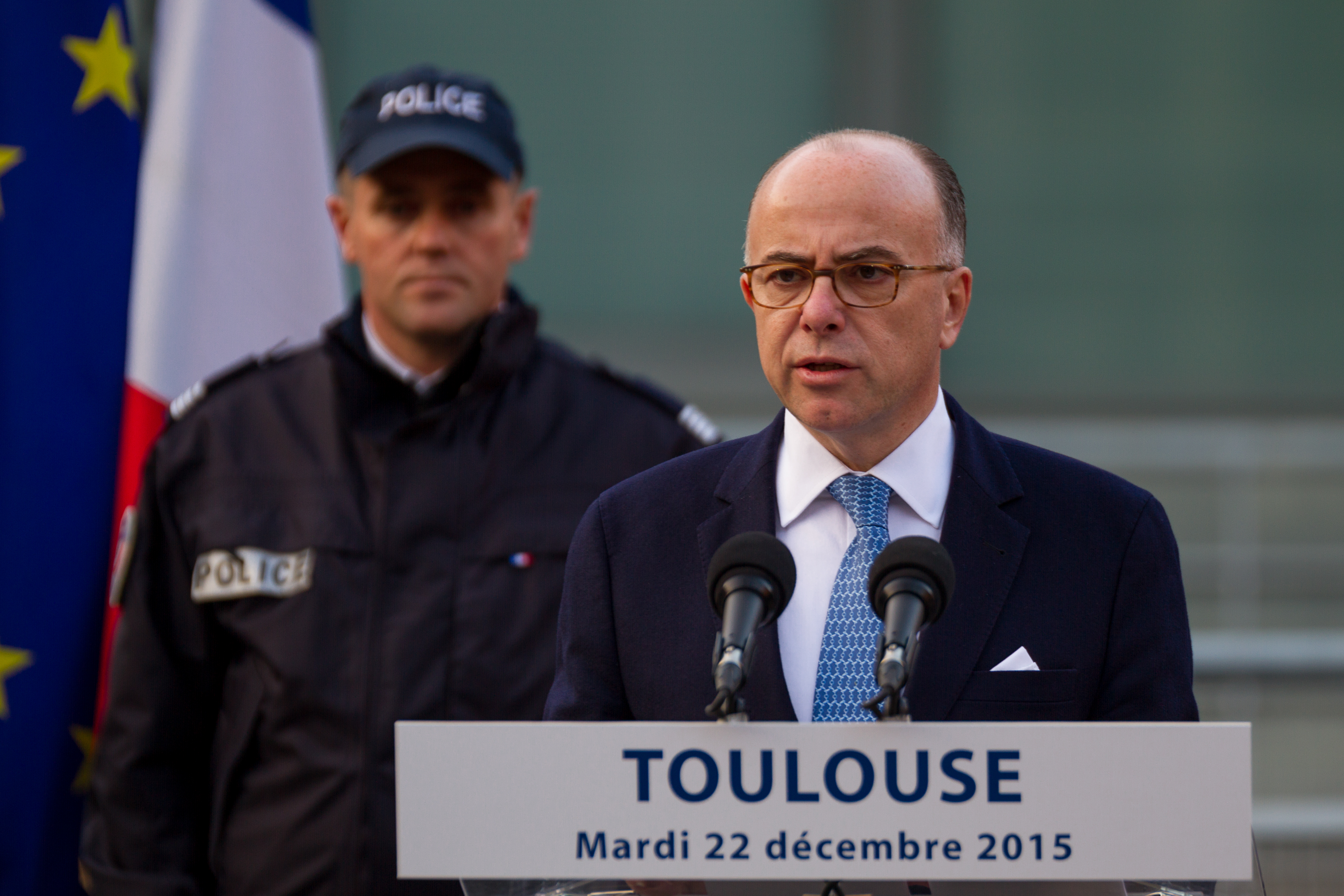
Bernard Cazeneuve visiting Toulouse's main police station

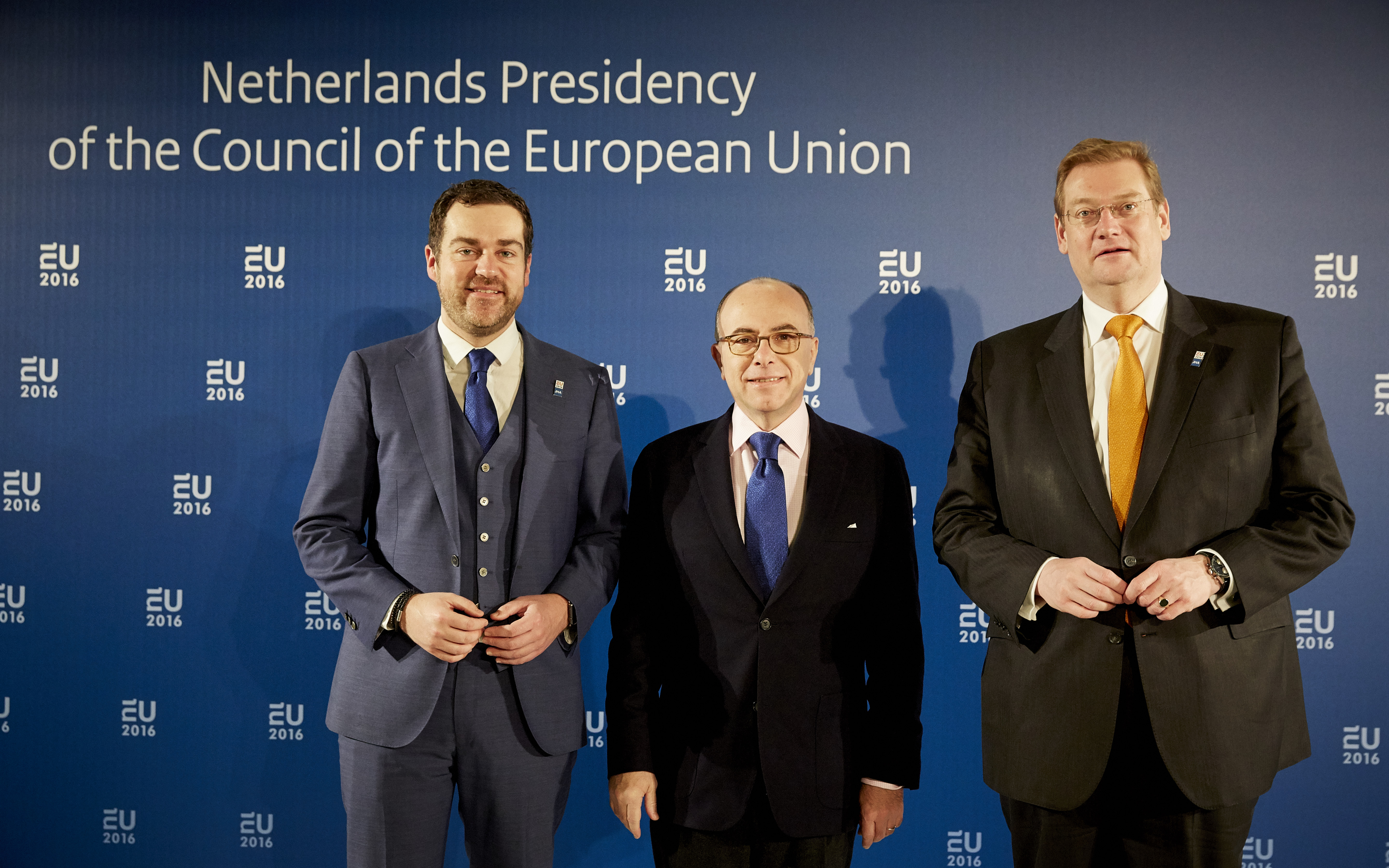
Cazeneuve in Amsterdam with Dutch Justice Minister Ard van der Steur (right) and State Secretary Klaas Dijkhoff (left), 2016

On 2 April 2014, Cazeneuve was named Minister of the Interior in the First Valls Government. In January 2015, he directed the response to the Île-de-France attacks.

During a vote on a counter-terrorism law, he proposed an amendment that would give authority to demand that search engines de-list certain website without the approval of a judge. In July 2015, he proposed a reform to the rights of foreigners in France, which would fundamentally change policies concerning entry and length of stay.

As a spokesman for France after 18 November 2015 killing of the suspected mastermind of the terrorists responsible for the November 2015 Paris attacks, Cazeneuve told the press that Abdelhamid Abaaoud, a Moroccan who was a Belgian national who had visited Syria, "played a decisive role" in the Paris attacks and played a part in four of six terror attacks foiled since spring, with one alleged jihadist claiming Abaaoud had trained him personally.

Cazeneuve said that he would be meeting with EU ministers on 20 November in Brussels to discuss how to deal with terrorism across the territory because "cooperation in the fight against terrorism is crucial" in the European Union. "We have to move quickly and strongly. Europe must do it while thinking about the victims of terrorism and their loved ones."

Reports after that meeting indicated that all EU citizens entering or leaving the free-travel area, known as Schengen, should undergo "systematic" screening against pan-European databases. "Terrorists are crossing the borders of the European Union", said Cazeneuve. Indeed, all of the known Paris attackers were EU nationals, who crossed borders without difficulty although they were registered as terrorism suspects, according to The Guardian. Cazeneuve, said the clampdown on borders would take effect immediately. This would be on a temporary basis until the European commission modified the Schengen rules to make the new borders regime mandatory and obligatory; that could take months to enact.

=== Prime Minister of France ===
Valls announced on 6 December 2016 that, as the likely candidate for the Socialist Party in the presidential election, he would resign to concentrate on campaigning. Cazeneuve was appointed by outgoing President Hollande to replace Valls. The appointment was considered difficult, since it resulted in a change of leadership in the Interior Ministry at a time when the French terror alert was at its highest level. Cazeneuve officially resigned on 10 May 2017, after the official announcement of the results of the presidential election. His tenure as prime minister, at five months and four days, was the shortest in the history of the Fifth Republic until that of Michel Barnier, lasting 90 days. He was replaced by Édouard Philippe, nominated by new President Emmanuel Macron.

== Later career ==
After leaving Matignon, he returned to his private law practice. In 2022, Cazeneuve resigned from the Honorary Board of Fight Impunity, a Brussels-based human rights NGO, following corruption allegations against its founder, Antonio Panzeri.

That same year, Cazeneuve resigned from the Socialist Party over leader Olivier Faure's agreement to run a joint electoral list with Jean-Luc Mélenchon's La France Insoumise, known as the Nouvelle Union populaire écologique et sociale (New People's Ecologic and Social Union, or NUPES), feeling that Mélenchon's party and traditional French social democracy were incompatible. In September 2022, he wrote a manifesto calling for a "social-democratic, republican, humanist and ecological left", away from Mélenchon and NUPES. It was signed by 400 current and former members of the Socialist Party. In early 2023, he announced "La Convention" (The Convention), a political movement espousing those values. It held its first meeting on 10 June 2023, where Cazeneuve was joined by François Hollande, as well as former Social Democratic Party of Germany leader Martin Schulz and former Italian Democratic Party leader and prime minister Enrico Letta.

On 12 November 2023, he took part in the March for the Republic and Against Antisemitism in Paris in response to the rise of anti-Semitism in France since the start of the Gaza war.

Following the 2024 French legislative election, France experienced months of political deadlock, during which President Emmanuel Macron considered various candidates for the position of Prime Minister. The left-wing alliance New Popular Front (NFP), which secured a plurality of votes, nominated Lucie Castets for the role. However, in August 2024, Le Monde reported that Cazeneuve was among the front-runners. His candidacy sparked controversy with the NFP, with members of La France Insoumise (LFI) condemning it as a "total betrayal of millions of voters". Meaning, others, including Socialist Paris Mayor Anne Hidalgo, supported Cazeneuve and criticised the Socialist Party leadership for obstructing his nomination. Eventually, Macron appointed conservative Michel Barnier as the head of a coalition government.

== Personal life ==
Cazeneuve had a wife, Véronique, with whom he had two children. The couple divorced but remarried on 12 August 2015 in Aiguines. She was an editor at Éditions À dos d'âne, a publisher of young adult fiction. They resided in Domaine du Lys-Chantilly, a tree-lined community in Oise not far from Paris. She died in June 2024.

He was a business lawyer from 2006 to 2008.

== Works ==
- Cazeneuve, Bernard (1993). Première manche : chronique politique et littéraire. Cherbourg: Isoète. ISBN 978-2-905385-49-9. OCLC 30948346.
- Cazeneuve, Bernard (1994). La Politique retrouvée. Cherbourg: Isoète. ISBN 978-2-905385-57-4. OCLC 32919541.
- Cazeneuve, Bernard (2005). La responsabilité du fait des produits : en France et en Europe. Paris: Dunod. ISBN 978-2-10-048354-9. OCLC 420584348.
- Cazeneuve, Bernard (2011). Karachi, l'enquête impossible. Paris: Calmann-Lévy. ISBN 978-2-7021-4219-6. OCLC 721821135.

Political offices
Preceded by Jean Leonetti	Minister Delegate for European Affairs; 2012–2013	Succeeded by Thierry Repentin
Preceded by Jérôme Cahuzac	Minister Delegate for the Budget; 2013–2014	Succeeded by Christian Eckert
Preceded by Manuel Valls	Minister of the Interior; 2014–2016	Succeeded by Bruno Le Roux
Preceded by Manuel Valls	Prime Minister of France; 2016–2017	Succeeded by Édouard Philippe
Order of precedence
Preceded by Manuel Valls as former Prime Minister	Order of precedence of France; Former Prime Minister	Succeeded by Édouard Philippe as former Prime Minister
