= Frédéric Weber =

French politician (born 1973)

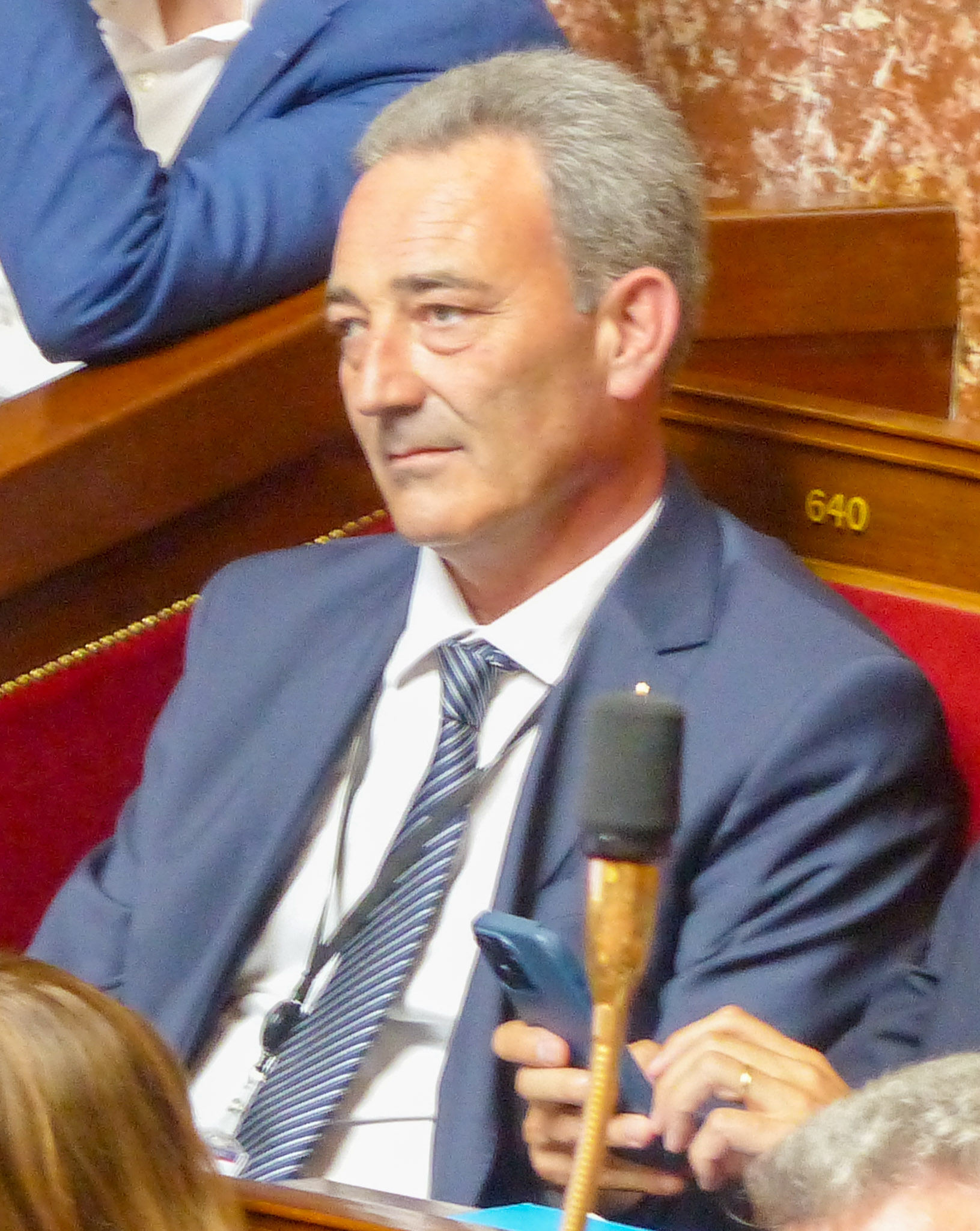
- Weber in 2024

Member of the French National Assembly for Meurthe-et-Moselle's 3rd constituency
- Incumbent
- Assumed office 18 July 2024
- Preceded by: Martine Etienne

Personal details
- Born: 21 May 1973 (age 53) Metz
- Party: National Rally (since 2023)
- Other political affiliations: French Democratic Confederation of Labour; Workers' Force

Frédéric Weber (born 21 May, 1973) is a French trade union activist and politician of the National Rally. He was elected as a deputy for Meurthe-et-Moselle's 3rd constituency during the 2024 French legislative election.

== Biography ==
Weber was born in Metz in 1973. He worked as a nurse for the ArcelorMittal steel company in Florange. During this time, Weber became a member and activist for the French Democratic Confederation of Labour before joining the Workers' Force which was classified as more to the left. He was involved in campaigns against the closure of blast furnaces in Hayange and Florange.

In 2023, Weber announced that while he agreed with La France insoumise (LFI) on certain positions, he had chosen to join the National Rally (RN), saying he was sceptical about the fact that NUPES would not vote on motions of censure tabled during 2023 French pension reform strikes.

Weber stood as a candidate for the National Rally during the 2024 European Parliament election but was not elected. For the 2024 legislative elections, he stood as the RN candidate for Meurthe-et-Moselle's 3rd constituency and defeated outgoing deputy Martine Étienne of the LFI.
