= Jacques Hébert (disambiguation) =

Jacques Hébert (1757–1794) was a French journalist and revolutionary.

Jacques Hébert may also refer to:

- Jacques Hébert (Canadian politician) (1923–2007), member of the Senate of Canada
- Jacques Hébert (French politician) (1920–2018), member of the French National Assembly
