= Results of the 2024 French legislative election in Manche =

Following the first round of the 2024 French legislative election on 30 June 2024, runoff elections in each constituency where no candidate received a vote share greater than 50 percent were scheduled for 7 July. Candidates permitted to stand in the runoff elections needed to either come in first or second place in the first round or achieve more than 12.5 percent of the votes of the entire electorate (as opposed to 12.5 percent of the vote share due to low turnout).

== Manche ==
=== 1st constituency ===
Candidate	Party or alliance		First round		Second round	
Candidate	Party or alliance		Votes	%	Votes	%
Philippe Gosselin	Miscellaneous right	The Republicans	22,513	38.30	36,531	63.45
Franck Simon	National Rally		19,333	32.89	21,046	36.55
Guillaume Hédouin	New Popular Front	The Ecologists	10,792	18.36		
Michaël Masson	Ensemble	Miscellaneous centre	4,723	8.04		
Olivia Lewi	Far-left	Lutte Ouvrière	578	0.98		
Laurent Besagny	Reconquête		418	0.71		
Baptiste Rajaut	Ecologists	Independent	250	0.43		
Jacques Poisson	Independent		171	0.29		
Total			58,778	100.00	57,577	100.00
Valid votes			58,778	97.91	57,577	96.26
Invalid votes			328	0.55	545	0.91
Blank votes			929	1.55	1,694	2.83
Total votes			60,035	100.00	59,816	100.00
Registered voters/turnout			86,727	69.22	86,729	68.97

=== 2nd constituency ===
Candidate	Party or alliance		First round		Second round	
Candidate	Party or alliance		Votes	%	Votes	%
Bertrand Sorre	Ensemble	Renaissance	26,555	39.91	40,472	62.90
Marie-Françoise Kurdziel	National Rally		21,186	31.84	23,870	37.10
Patrick Grimbert	New Popular Front	La France Insoumise	11,529	17.33		
Julie Barenton-Guillas	Miscellaneous right	Independent	5,739	8.62		
Mai Tran	Far-left	Lutte Ouvrière	811	1.22		
Hervé Retailleau	Reconquête		721	1.08		
Total			66,541	100.00	64,342	100.00
Valid votes			66,541	97.48	64,342	95.14
Invalid votes			525	0.77	849	1.26
Blank votes			1,193	1.75	2,436	3.60
Total votes			68,259	100.00	67,627	100.00
Registered voters/turnout			96,780	70.53	96,785	69.87

=== 3rd constituency ===
Candidate	Party or alliance		First round		Second round	
Candidate	Party or alliance		Votes	%	Votes	%
Pierre Giry	Union of the far right	The Republicans	25,725	33.89	30,844	41.33
Stéphane Travert	Ensemble	Renaissance	25,232	33.24	43,785	58.67
Gaëlle Verove	New Popular Front	Communist Party	15,191	20.01		
Stéphanie Maubé	Independent		6,951	9.16		
Yohann Quesnel	Sovereigntist right	Independent	945	1.24		
Christian Guyot	Reconquête		842	1.11		
Mansour Ayouti	Far-left	Lutte Ouvrière	629	0.83		
Aurélien Verleyen	Ecologists	Independent	389	0.51		
Total			75,904	100.00	74,629	100.00
Valid votes			75,904	97.48	74,629	95.06
Invalid votes			505	0.65	928	1.18
Blank votes			1,454	1.87	2,947	3.75
Total votes			77,863	100.00	78,504	100.00
Registered voters/turnout			111,098	70.08	111,091	70.67

=== 4th constituency ===
Candidate	Party or alliance		First round		Second round	
Candidate	Party or alliance		Votes	%	Votes	%
Anna Pic	New Popular Front	Socialist Party	19,940	34.23	32,748	59.64
Nicolas Conquer	Union of the far right	The Republicans	17,481	30.01	22,166	40.36
Yann Lepetit	Ensemble	Horizons	10,417	17.88		
Camille Margueritte	Miscellaneous right	Miscellaneous centre	8,637	14.83		
Abdelkader Benramdane	Far-left	Lutte Ouvrière	900	1.54		
Yann Da Cruz-Legeleux	Reconquête		884	1.52		
Total			58,259	100.00	54,914	100.00
Valid votes			58,259	97.52	54,914	91.86
Invalid votes			399	0.67	1,020	1.71
Blank votes			1,082	1.81	3,848	6.44
Total votes			59,740	100.00	59,782	100.00
Registered voters/turnout			88,663	67.38	88,677	67.42
