= Jean-Pierre Godefroy =

French politician

Member of the French Senate for Manche
- In office 23 September 2001 – 1 October 2017
- Succeeded by: Jean-Michel Houllegatte

Mayor of Cherbourg
- In office 23 September 1980 – 19 March 2001
- Preceded by: Louis Darinot
- Succeeded by: Bernard Cazeneuve

Member of the Regional Council of Lower Normandy
- In office 28 March 2004 – 13 December 2015
- President: Philippe Duron; Laurent Beauvais

Personal details
- Born: 23 September 1944 (age 81) Indret, Loire-Inférieure, France
- Party: Socialist Party
- Profession: Boilermaker

Jean-Pierre Godefroy (born 23 September 1944) is a member of the Senate of France, representing the Manche department. He is a member of the Socialist Party.
