= Sonia Krimi =

French politician

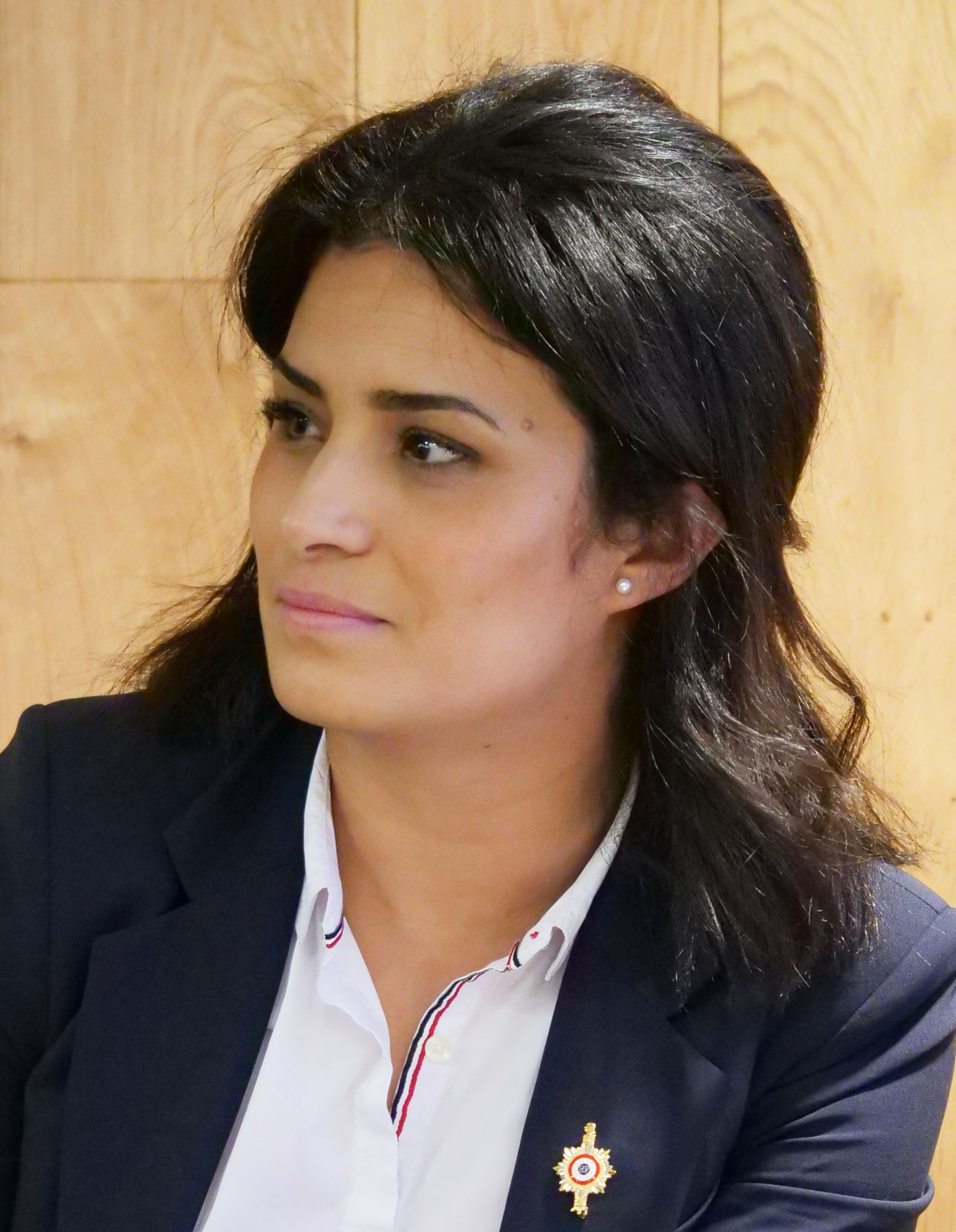
- Sonia Krimi in 2017

Member of the National Assembly for Manche's 4th constituency
- In office 21 June 2017 – 19 June 2022
- Preceded by: Bernard Cazeneuve
- Succeeded by: Anna Pic

Personal details
- Born: 20 December 1982 (age 43) Tunis, Tunisia
- Party: Renaissance
- Education: University of Toulon

Sonia Krimi (Arabic: سنية كريمي ; born 20 December 1982 in Tunis) is a French–Tunisian politician of La République en Marche ! (LREM) who served as a member of the French National Assembly from 2017 to 2022, representing the 4th constituency of Manche. She defeated the endorsed LREM candidate, Blaise Mistler at the 2017 election. She is considered to be part of the party's left wing.

== Early life and education ==
Krimi was born in Tunis in 1982, and was the eldest of her five sisters. Her father was a worker at Peugeot in Tunis and her mother was a housewife. Her passion was reading.

Krimi studied business in Tunisia and later pursued a double master's degree and a doctorate in Toulon in France. She obtained from the Provence-Alpes-Côte d'Azur region a scholarship to carry out a thesis in economics on competitiveness clusters.

== Early career ==
Krimi became a professor in management, accounting and corporate strategy at Paris 2 Panthéon-Assas University. She applied for French nationality, and obtained it in 2012. She left teaching to become a business consultant for large companies.

== Political career ==
When she worked in Normandy, Krimi joined the political movement En Marche! and its local committee after the presidential election in 2017.

In parliament, Krimi serves as member of the Committee on Foreign Affairs. In addition to her committee assignments, she is part of the French delegation to the NATO Parliamentary Assembly. She is a member of the parliamentary friendship groups with Saudi Arabia, Tunisia and Egypt.

In December 2017, Krimi asked a probing question to Gérard Collomb, French Minister of the Interior, in the Questions au gouvernement (a French public service television program broadcast on Tuesdays and Wednesdays, from 3 pm to 4 pm on France 3 on LCP, during the parliamentary session) concerning the political balance of his bill on the "right of asylum" and "the controlled immigration", and referring to Emmanuel Macron's speech in Orléans asking for "more humanity and dignity" on the reception of foreigners. In his answer Gérard Collomb underlines her "wonderful career", stating "I hope that many young people, tomorrow, will have the same as her".

At the end of 2017, Krimi was one around thirty LREM members under the leadership of Brigitte Bourguignon who claimed to be the parliamentary group's "social fibre" and organized themselves as its left wing; by the end of 2018, Krimi took over the group's leadership from Bourguignon.

In September 2018, after François de Rugy's appointment to the government, Krimi supported Barbara Pompili's candidacy for the presidency of the National Assembly. In 2020, she joined En commun (EC), a group within LREM led by Pompili.

Together with Sébastien Nadot, Krimi led a parliamentary inquiry into France's immigration policies.

She lost her seat in the second round of the 2022 French legislative election to Anna Pic of NUPES.

== Political positions ==
In April 2018, Krimi joined other co-signatories around Sébastien Nadot in officially filing a request for a commission of inquiry into the legality of French weapons sales to the Saudi-led coalition fighting in Yemen, days before an official visit of Saudi Crown Prince Mohammed bin Salman to Paris.

In July 2019, Krimi voted in favor of the French ratification of the European Union’s Comprehensive Economic and Trade Agreement (CETA) with Canada.

On immigration, Krimi is considered to be part of her parliamentary group's more liberal wing. In late 2019, she was among the critics of the government's legislative proposals on immigrations and instead joined 17 LREM members who recommended, in particular, greater access to the labour market for migrants, but also "specific measures for collaboration with the authorities of safe countries, such as Albania and Georgia, in order to inform candidates for departure, in their country of origin, of what the asylum application really is."
