= Manche's 4th constituency =

Constituency of the National Assembly of France

4th constituency of Manche
- inline Constituency of the National Assembly of France

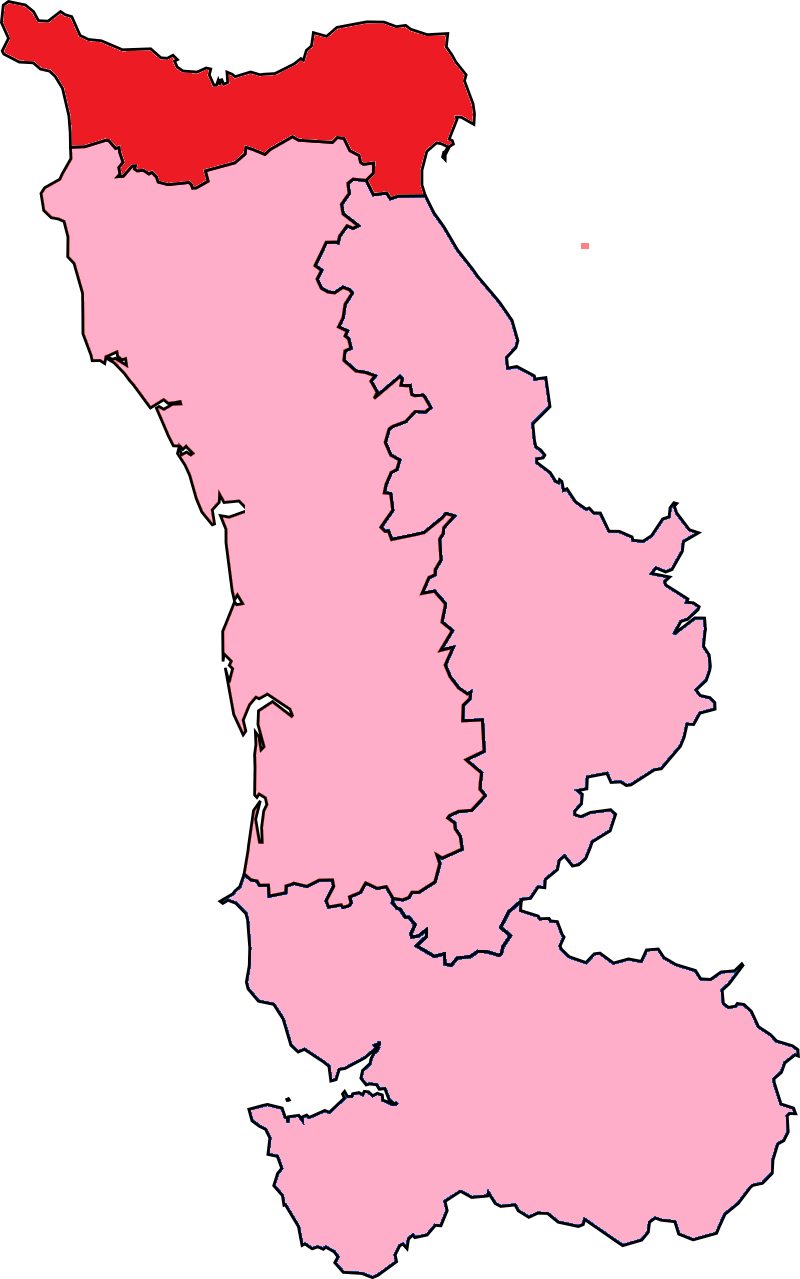
- Manche's 4th Constituency shown within Manche
- Deputy: Anna Pic; PS
- Department: Manche
- Cantons: Beaumont-Hague, Cherbourg Nord-Ouest, Cherbourg Sud-Est, Cherbourg-Octeville Sud-Ouest, Equeurdreville-Hainneville, Quettehou, Saint-Pierre-Eglise, Tourlaville
- Registered voters: 88707

The 4th constituency of the Manche (French: Quatrième circonscription de la Manche) is a French legislative constituency in the Manche département. Like the other 576 French constituencies, it elects one MP using the two-round system, with a run-off if no candidate receives over 50% of the vote in the first round.

== Description ==
The 4th Constituency of the Manche largely consists of the city of Cherbourg and the most northerly parts of the Cotentin Peninsula.

The seat was changed substantially as a result of the 2010 redistricting of French legislative constituencies, which removed one constituency from Manche. Manche's 5th constituency was abolished, and merged with the 4th constituency. This change resulted in Cherbourg being included in the seat and therefore radically changed its demographic make up.

Before these changes the seat leant conservative at each run off, after the changes the PS on the left has won and a centre-left Independent.

From the first year of her single tenure to date, on defeating the official En Marche! candidate, Sonia Krimi joined that group.

Anna Pic of the NUPES group including the PS defeated Krimi in 2022 and won re-election in 2024.

== Assembly Members ==
Election	Member	Party
1958	Pierre Godefroy	UNR
1962	Pierre Godefroy	UNR
1967	Pierre Godefroy	UDR
1968	Pierre Godefroy	UDR
1973	Pierre Godefroy	UDR
1978	Pierre Godefroy	RPR
1981	Pierre Godefroy	RPR
1986	Proportional representation – no election by constituency	
1988	Claude Gatignol	UDF
1993	Claude Gatignol	UDF
1997	Claude Gatignol	UDF
2002	Claude Gatignol	UMP
2007	Claude Gatignol	UMP
2012	Bernard Cazeneuve	PS
2012	Geneviève Gosselin	PS
2017	Sonia Krimi	DIV
2017	Sonia Krimi	LREM
2022	Anna Pic	PS

== Election results ==
=== 2024 ===
Legislative Election 2024: Manche's 4th constituency
HOR (Ensemble)	Yann Lepetit	10,417	17.88	N/A
DVC	Camille Margueritte	8,637	14.83	N/A
LR (UXD)	Nicolas Conquer	17,481	30.01	N/A
REC	Yann Da Cruz-Legeleux	884	1.52	−1.52
LO	Abdelkader Benramdane	900	1.54	N/A
PS (NFP)	Anna Pic	19,940	34.23	+2.62
Turnout		58,259	97.52	+49.52
Registered electors		88,663		
2nd round result
PS	Anna Pic	32,748	59.64	+25.41
LR	Nicolas Conquer	22,166	40.36	+10.35
Turnout		54,914	91.86	−5.66
Registered electors		88 677		
Party	Candidate	Votes	%	±%
PS hold		Swing		

=== 2022 ===
Legislative Election 2022: Manche's 4th constituency
Party	Candidate	Votes	%	±%
PS (NUPÉS)	Anna Pic	13,280	31.61	+0.46
LREM (Ensemble)	Sonia Krimi	12,664	30.14	+6.38
RN	Eric Fouace	7,120	16.95	+3.74
LC (UDC)	Camille Margueritte	4,720	11.23	−0.43
REC	Yann Da Cruz-Legeleux	1,279	3.04	N/A
UDI (UDC)	Nicolas Calluaud	923	2.20	N/A
PA	Laure Jean	883	2.10	N/A
Others	N/A	1,145	2.73	
Turnout		42,014	48.00	−0.47
2nd round result
PS (NUPÉS)	Anna Pic	20,482	51.61	N/A
LREM (Ensemble)	Sonia Krimi	19,204	48.39	+9.32
Turnout		39,686	47.53	+18.60
PS gain from DIV				

=== 2017 ===
Legislative Election 2017: Manche's 4th constituency
Party	Candidate	Votes	%	±%
LREM	Blaise Mistler	10,219	23.76	
DIV	Sonia Krimi	7,261	16.89	
FN	Jean-Jacques Noel	5,680	13.21	
PS	Arnaud Catherine	5,588	13.00	
LR	Sophie Guyon	5,016	11.66	
LFI	Yvonne Pecoraro	4,574	10.64	
PCF	Valérie Varenne	1,648	3.83	
EELV	Jean-Sébastien Hederer	1,583	3.68	
Others	N/A	1,432		
Turnout		43,001	48.47	
2nd round result
DIV	Sonia Krimi	15,636	60.93	
LREM	Blaise Mistler	10,028	39.07	
Turnout		25,664	28.93	
DIV gain from PS				

=== 2012 ===
Won by Bernard Cazeneuve in the first round.

Legislative Election 2012: Manche's 4th constituency
Party	Candidate	Votes	%	±%
PS	Bernard Cazeneuve	27,738	55.39	
UMP	David Margueritte	11,602	23.17	
FN	Jean-Jacques Noel	5,238	10.46	
FG	Ralph Lejamtel	2,319	4.63	
EELV	Catherine Marrey	1,274	2.54	
Others	N/A	1,905		
Turnout		50,076	56.45	
PS hold				
