= Manche's 5th constituency =

Constituency of the French Fifth Republic

The constituencies of Manche in 1986.

Manche's 5th constituency (French: Cinquième circonscription de la Manche) was a French legislative constituency in the Manche département which existed from 1958 until 2012.

It was abolished in the 2010 redistricting of French legislative constituencies, which reduced the number of constituencies in Manche to 4. The territory of the constituency, in the north of the department, moved to the new 4th constituency. The constituency was based around the city of Cherbourg.

== Members ==
- René Schmitt (1958 to 1962)
- Jacques Hébert (1962 to 1968)
- Louis Darinot (1968 to 1973)
- Jacques Hébert 1968 to 1973)
- Louis Darinot (1973 to 1986)
- Olivier Stirn (1986 to 1993)
- Yves Bonnet (1993 to 1997)
- Bernard Cazeneuve (1997 to 2002)
- Jean Lemière (2002 to 2007)
- Bernard Cazeneuve (2007 to 2012)
