= Xavier Paluszkiewicz =

French politician (born 1972)

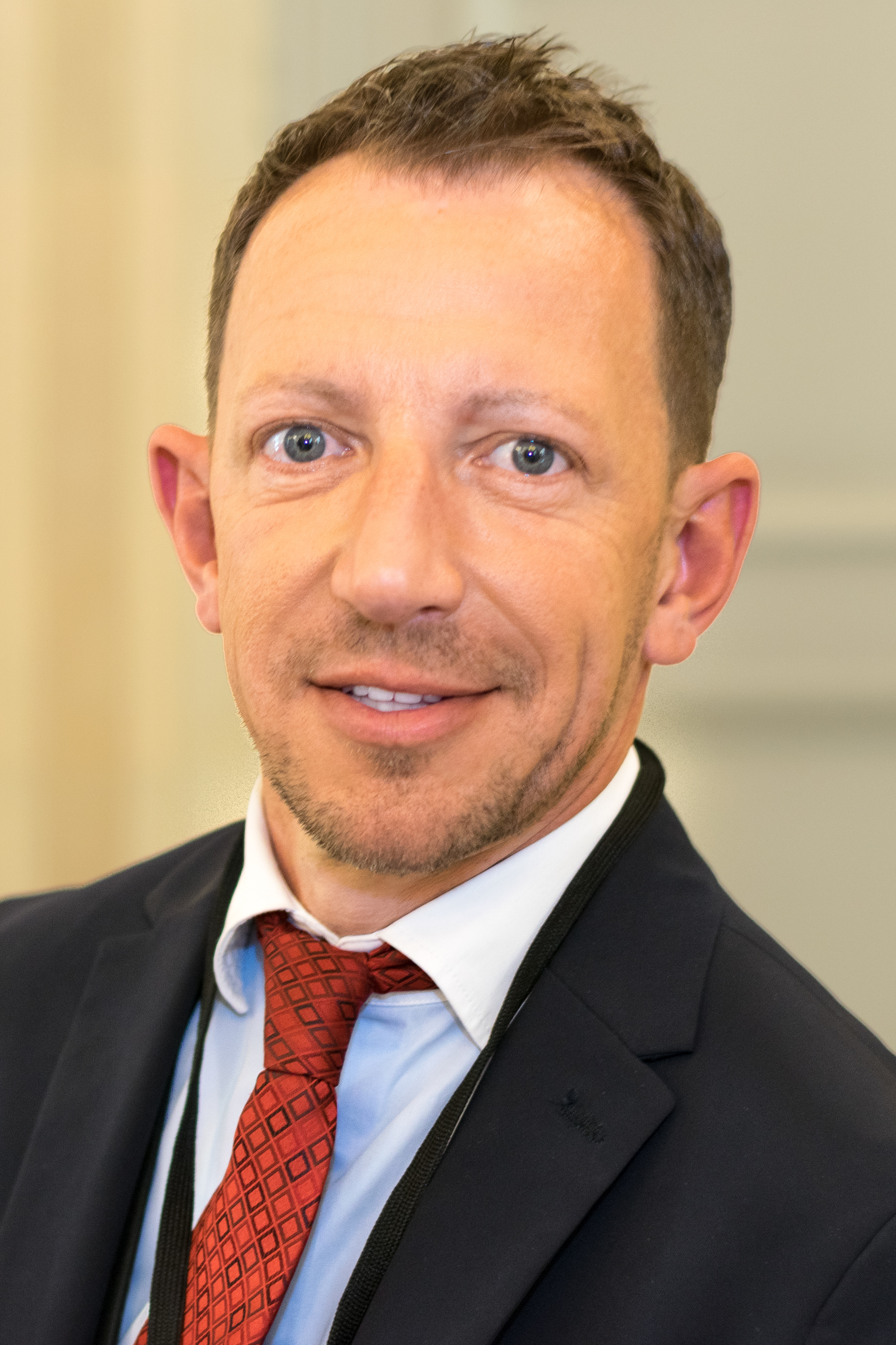
- Xavier Paluszkiewicz in 2017

Member of the National Assembly for Meurthe-et-Moselle's 3rd constituency
- In office 21 June 2017 – 21 June 2022
- Preceded by: Jean-Marc Fournel
- Succeeded by: Martine Etienne

Personal details
- Born: 13 December 1972 (age 53) Villerupt, France
- Party: La République En Marche!

Xavier Paluszkiewicz (Polish pronunciation: [paluʂˈkʲɛvʲit͡ʂ], born 13 December 1972) is a French politician of La République En Marche! (LREM) who served as member of the French National Assembly from 2017 to 2022, representing the department of Meurthe-et-Moselle. His father is Polish and mother Italian.

== Political career ==
Previously employed in a Luxembourg bank, Paluszkiewicz relied on his family to finance his 33,000 euro campaign expenses for the 2017 elections.

In parliament, Paluszkiewicz served as member of the Finance Committee and the Committee on European Affairs. In addition to his committee assignments, he is part of the parliamentary friendship groups with Cuba, Luxembourg and Singapore.

He lost his seat in the 2022 French legislative election to Martine Etienne from NUPES. He was defeated with 48.06% of the vote to his opponent's 51.94%.

== Political positions ==
In July 2019, Paluszkiewicz decided not to align with his parliamentary group's majority, and became one of 52 LREM members who abstained from a vote on the French ratification of the European Union’s Comprehensive Economic and Trade Agreement (CETA) with Canada.

== See also ==
- 2017 French legislative election
