= Yves Bonnet =

French official and politician

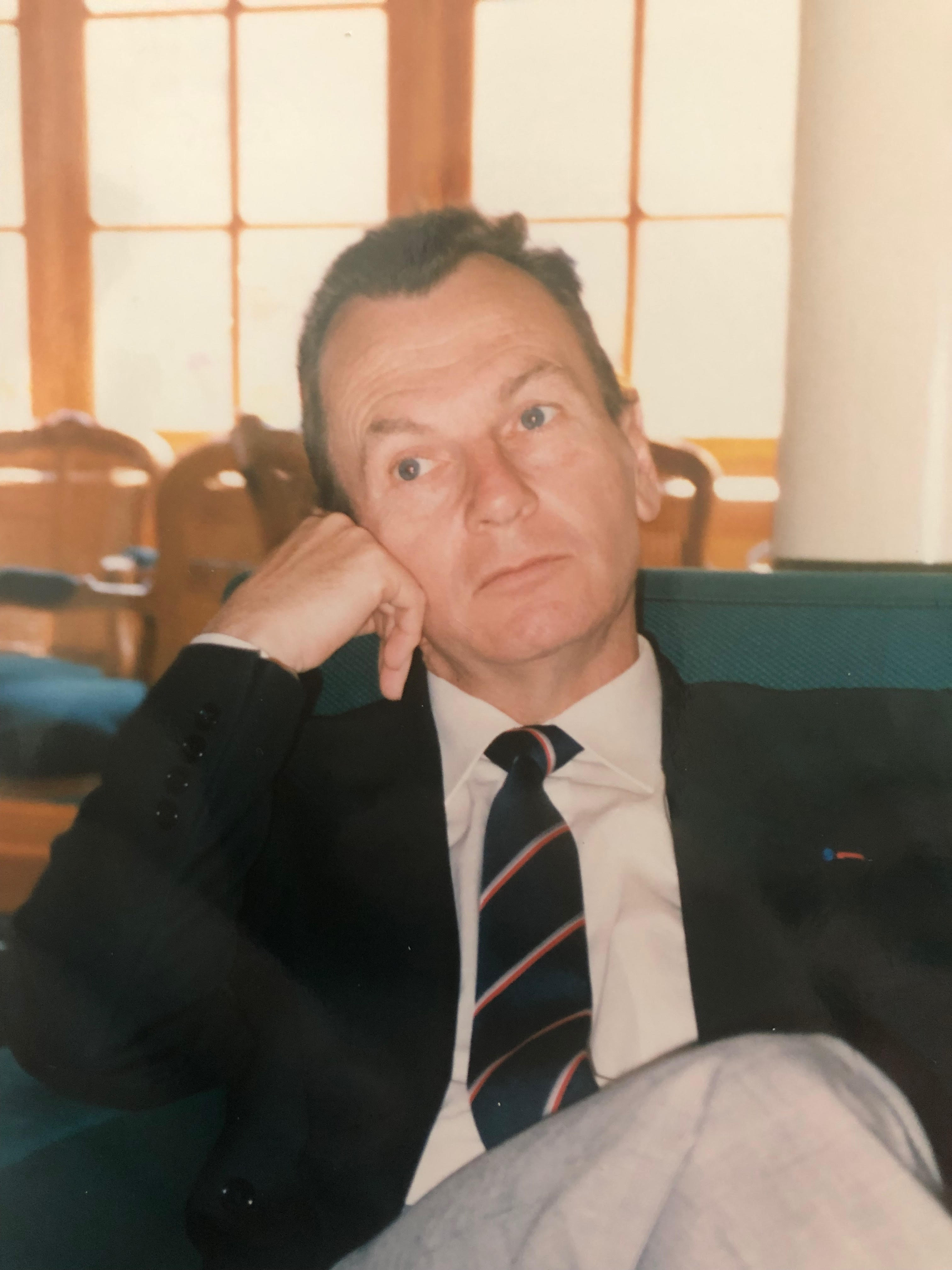

Member of Parliament
- In office April 2, 1993 – April 21, 1997
- Constituency: Manche's 5th constituency

Personal details
- Born: November 20, 1935 (age 90) Chartres, France
- Party: National Rally
- Education: Paris Institute of Political Studies

Yves Bonnet (French pronunciation: [iv bɔnɛ]; born 20 November 1935) is a senior French civil servant and politician. He was prefect and director of the DST from 1982 to 1985. A member of the UDF, he served as deputy for the unified party from 1993 to 1997, before joining the National Rally during the regional elections of 2021.

== Early life ==
Yves Bonnet was born on November 20, 1935, in Chartres, France. He is the son of Henri Bonnet, Diplomat and former mayor of Châteaudun. Yves Bonnet lived his childhood in this city, doing all his schooling there. He studied political science and graduated from the Paris Institute of Political Studies in the late 1950s. During the Algerian war, he was an officer of the contingent.

== Career ==
He joined the prefectural body in 1958. Sub-prefect of La Trinité from 1968 to 1970, Arles from 1974 to 1976, Cherbourg (1976–1978) and of Dunkirk (1978–1981), he was then appointed prefect of Mayotte between January and of November 1982 and was appointed by President François Mitterrand Director of the Direction de la surveillance du territoire.

As such, he took over the Farewell affair initiated by his predecessor Marcel Chalet. He advised the president to expel the intelligence officers from the Russian embassy in France, which is validated by Mitterrand. He is responsible for dismantling several terrorist networks. He also initiated relations with several Arab security and intelligence services, including Algerian Military Security, and doubled the number of foreign liaisons. It computerizes the central file of the DST.

He was appointed prefect of Finistère on August 1, 1985, then prefect of the Guadeloupe region after the legislative elections of March 1986. He put an end to the activities of the independence organizations and had the members of the Caribbean Revolutionary Army (ARC) arrested. Guadeloupe then found the highest growth rate of the overseas departments.

He became prefect of the Marne department and the Champagne-Ardenne region in 1987. He was one of the initiators of the re-opening of Vatry airport and the promoter of partnerships with several regions of eastern countries (the CEEC) notably those of Oryol (in USSR), Toruń (in Poland), Piatra Neamț (in Romania), Košice (in Slovakia) and Schwerin (Mecklenburg-Vorpommern).

Yves Bonnet left his post as regional prefect to establish himself politically in Cherbourg, where he was an opposition municipal councilor representing the UDF.

He was the MP for Manche's 5th constituency between 1993 and 1997. In the National Assembly, he was a member of the National Defence and Armed Forces Committee as well as rapporteur for the navy budget.

In 2021, he joined the National Rally during the French regional elections on the list led by Nicolas Bay.

== Works ==
He is the author of numerous books, ranging from investigative documents to spy novels, and regularly speaks in the press about Iranian and Middle Eastern issues and terrorism.

- La Liberté surveillée, Thésaurus, 1993
- La Trahison des ayatollahs, Jean Picollec, 1995
- Mission ou Démission, Jean Picollec, 1996
- Contre-espionnage, mémoires d'un patron de la DST, Calmann-Lévy, 1998
- Lettre à une Algérienne, La Boite à documents, 1998
- De qui se moquent-ils ?, Flammarion, 2001
- La Cour des miracles, Flammarion, 2002
- Impondérables, Calmann-Lévy, 2003, thriller
- Top Secret, Timée Éditions, 2006
- Les Veuves blanches, La société des écrivains, 2006, roman
- Tube, Éditions Des Idées & Des Hommes, avril 2007, thriller
- Nucléaire iranien, une hypocrisie internationale, Michel Lafon, 2008
- Liban : les otages du mensonge, Michel Lafon, 2008
- Vevak, au service des ayatollahs, Timée Éditions, April 2009
- Gaza, au cœur de la tragédieavec Albert Farhat, Timée Éditions, June 2009
- Le Grand Complot, Jean-Claude Gawsewitch Éditeur, 544 pages, 2012
- Le berger de Touggourt, Vérités sur les moines de Tibhirine, 2016
- La deuxième guerre d'Algérie, VA éditions, March 2017
