= Martine Étienne =

French politician (born 1956)

Member of the National Assembly for Meurthe-et-Moselle's 3rd constituency
- Incumbent
- Assumed office 22 June 2022
- Preceded by: Xavier Paluszkiewicz

Personal details
- Born: 22 June 1956 (age 68); Mont-Saint-Martin, Meurthe-et-Moselle, France
- Political party: La France Insoumise

Martine Étienne (French pronunciation: [maʁtin etjɛn]; born 22 June 1956) is a French politician from La France Insoumise. She was elected as the Member of Parliament for Meurthe-et-Moselle's 3rd constituency in the 2022 French legislative election.

== Biography ==
Born in Mont-Saint-Martin (Meurthe-et-Moselle), Martine Étienne began her career as a letter carrier with the PTT in 1977, before becoming a counter clerk.

At the same time, she became a union member and shop steward with the FAPT-CGT.

=== Political career ===
Martine Étienne grew up in a highly politicized family, close to the French Communist Party (PCF).

She made the transition from trade unionism to political life in 1995, when she became Longwy town councillor.

During her second term as town councillor, Jean-Paul Durieux resigned as mayor of Longwy on June 23, 2006, and Jean-Marc Fournel was elected to succeed him. Following this election, Martine Étienne was appointed deputy mayor, with responsibility for housing and habitat.

At the same time, she became involved with the Attac association. In the 2008 cantonal elections, Martine Étienne ran as a left-wing candidate in the Longwy canton. She received 460 votes, or 11.34% of the total.

Following the 2014 and 2020 municipal elections, Martine Étienne was elected 2nd Deputy Mayor of Longwy, responsible for urban planning and housing. This election took place on July 7, when outgoing Socialist mayor Jean-Marc Fournel was re-elected.

For the 2021 regional elections in the Grand Est region, she is ranked 14th in the Meurthe-et-Moselle departmental section on the Appel inédit list, launched by Aurélie Filippetti. The list won 8.64% of the votes cast, but did not win any regional seats.

== See also ==
- List of deputies of the 16th National Assembly of France
