= Jacques Hébert (French politician) =

French politician

Mayor of Cherbourg
- In office 1959–1977
- Preceded by: René Schmitt
- Succeeded by: Louis Darinot

Member of the National Assembly for Manche's 5th constituency
- In office 1962–1973
- Preceded by: René Schmitt
- Succeeded by: Louis Darinot

Personal details
- Born: 8 August 1920 Falaise, France
- Died: 15 February 2018 (aged 97) Falaise, France
- Party: UDR

Jacques Hébert (8 August 1920 – 15 February 2018) was a French politician.

Born on 8 August 1920 in Falaise, Calvados, Hébert ended his medical studies at the age of 20 to join the Free French Forces. For his military service, Hébert was named a Grand Officier of the Legion of Honour and received an Order of Liberation. He was elected mayor of Cherbourg in 1959 and stepped down in 1977. Between 1963 and 1973, Hébert represented the fifth constituency of Manche in the National Assembly. He died in Falaise, Calvados, at the age of 97 on 15 February 2018.

== Biography ==
Jacques Hébert is the son of industrialist Pierre Hébert.

He began studying medicine in 1940, but interrupted his studies when he decided to join Charles de Gaulle in London as soon as he heard the appeal of June 18. He embarked with his brother Bernard—who would later become mayor of Verson—on the Polish ship Batory, then enlisted in the Free French Forces (FFL).

With the Free French Tank Company, he took part in several operations in Africa (Dakar, Cameroon, Gabon, Libya, El Alamein, Tunisia) and Syria, before joining the 2nd Armored Division. As a lieutenant, he landed on the beaches of Normandy on August 2, 1944, and took part in the Battle of Normandy as a communications officer, in the liberation of Paris and Strasbourg, and then fought in Germany until Adolf Hitler's bunker in Berchtesgaden, where he was wounded.

After leaving the army in June 1946, he resumed his medical studies. After defending a thesis entitled De l'origine congénitale du rétrécissement aortique (On the congenital origin of aortic stenosis), he became chief physician at the Interprofessional Center for Occupational Medicine in Cherbourg-Octeville. It was in this city that he began his political career as a Gaullist, succeeding René Schmitt as mayor and deputy.

He left the 1973 French legislative election campaign to his deputy Charles Dumoncel, who lost to the socialist Louis Darinot. The latter also succeeded him as mayor in 1977.

Jacques Hébert died on February 15, 2018, at the age of 97.
