= Anna Pic =

French politician

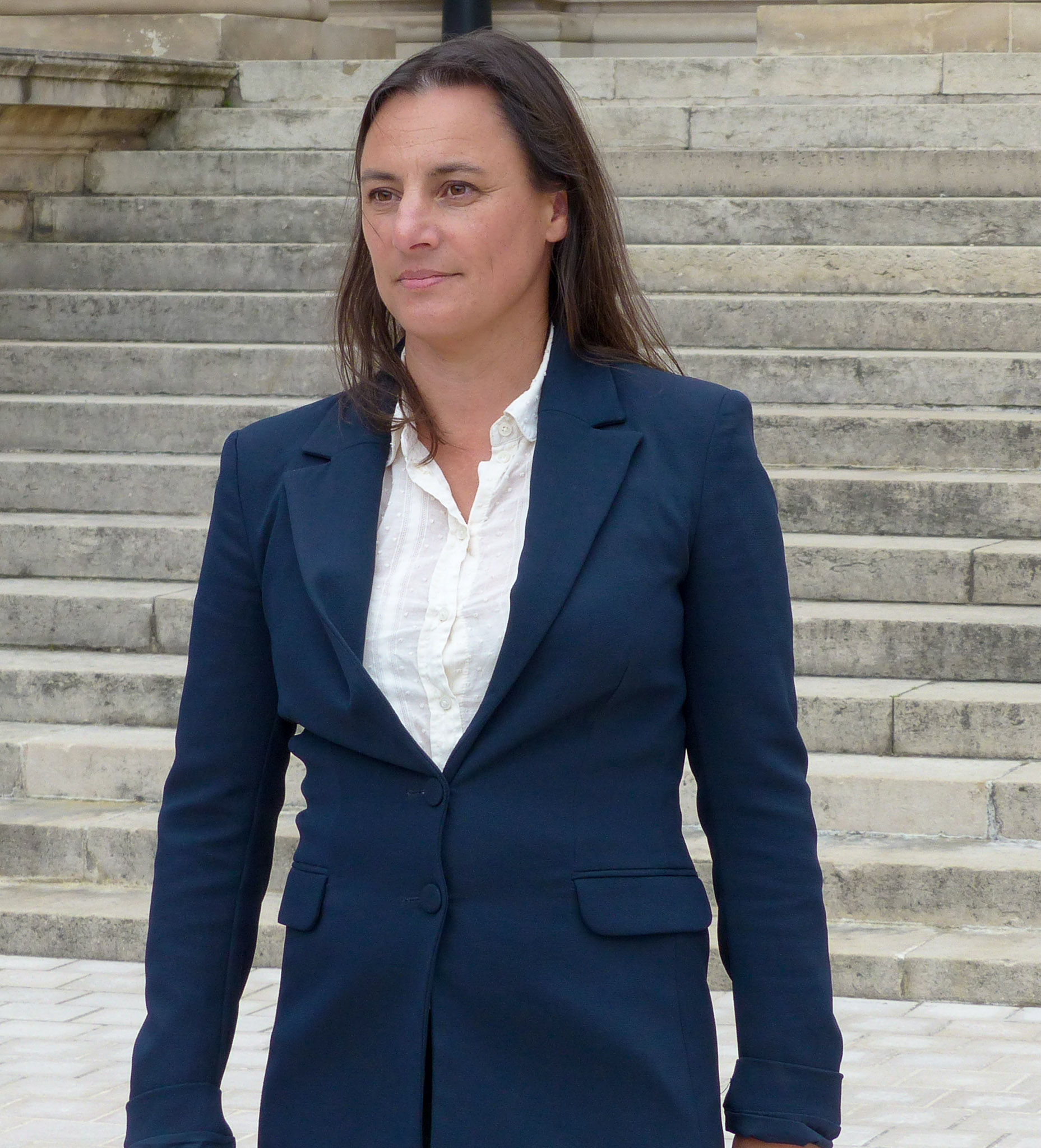

Member of the National Assembly for Manche's 4th constituency
- Incumbent
- Assumed office 22 June 2022
- Preceded by: Sonia Krimi

Personal details
- Born: 1 June 1978 (age 47) Montpellier, France
- Party: Socialist

Anna Pic (born 4 June 1978) is a French politician from the Socialist Party (NUPES) who has been the member of the National Assembly for Manche's 4th constituency since 2022.

In 2023, Pic publicly endorsed the re-election of the Socialist Party's chairman Olivier Faure.

== See also ==
- List of deputies of the 16th National Assembly of France
