= Christian Eckert =

French politician

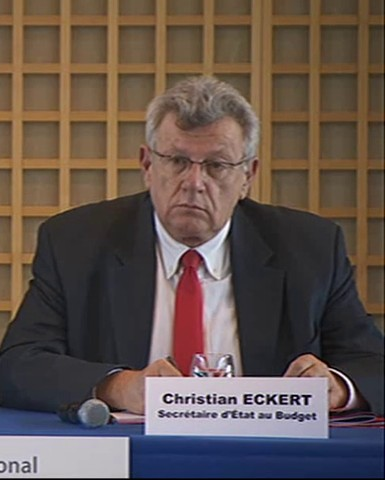
- Christian Eckert in 2014

Minister of the Budget
- In office 9 April 2014 – 10 May 2017
- President: François Hollande
- Prime Minister: Manuel Valls; Bernard Cazeneuve
- Preceded by: Bernard Cazeneuve
- Succeeded by: Gérald Darmanin

Personal details
- Born: 8 February 1956 (age 70) Algrange, France
- Party: Socialist Party

Christian Eckert (born 8 February 1956 in Algrange, Moselle) is a former member of the National Assembly of France. He represents the Meurthe-et-Moselle department, and is a member of the Socialiste, radical, citoyen et divers gauche.

Ahead of the Socialist Party's 2017 primaries, Eckert publicly endorsed Manuel Valls as the party's candidate for the presidential election later that year.

== Biography ==
Christian Eckert attended the École normale supérieure de Saint-Cloud as an auditor and passed the agrégation in mathematics. Alongside his studies, he worked during the summer at the Florange blast furnaces, at the Martin steelworks, to earn some money.

He teaches mathematics at high school level in BTS (advanced vocational training certificate) and preparatory Classe préparatoire aux grandes écoles. He taught at the Lycée Saint-Exupéry in Fameck (Moselle) from 1981 to 1991 and at the Lycée Louis-Bertrand in Briey (Meurthe-et-Moselle) from 1991 to 2007.
