= 2017 French legislative election =

- 11 June 2017 (first round); 18 June 2017 (second round)

All 577 seats in the National Assembly 289 seats needed for a majority
- Turnout: 48.7% (▼8.5 pp) (1st round); 42.6% (▼6.1 pp) (2nd round)
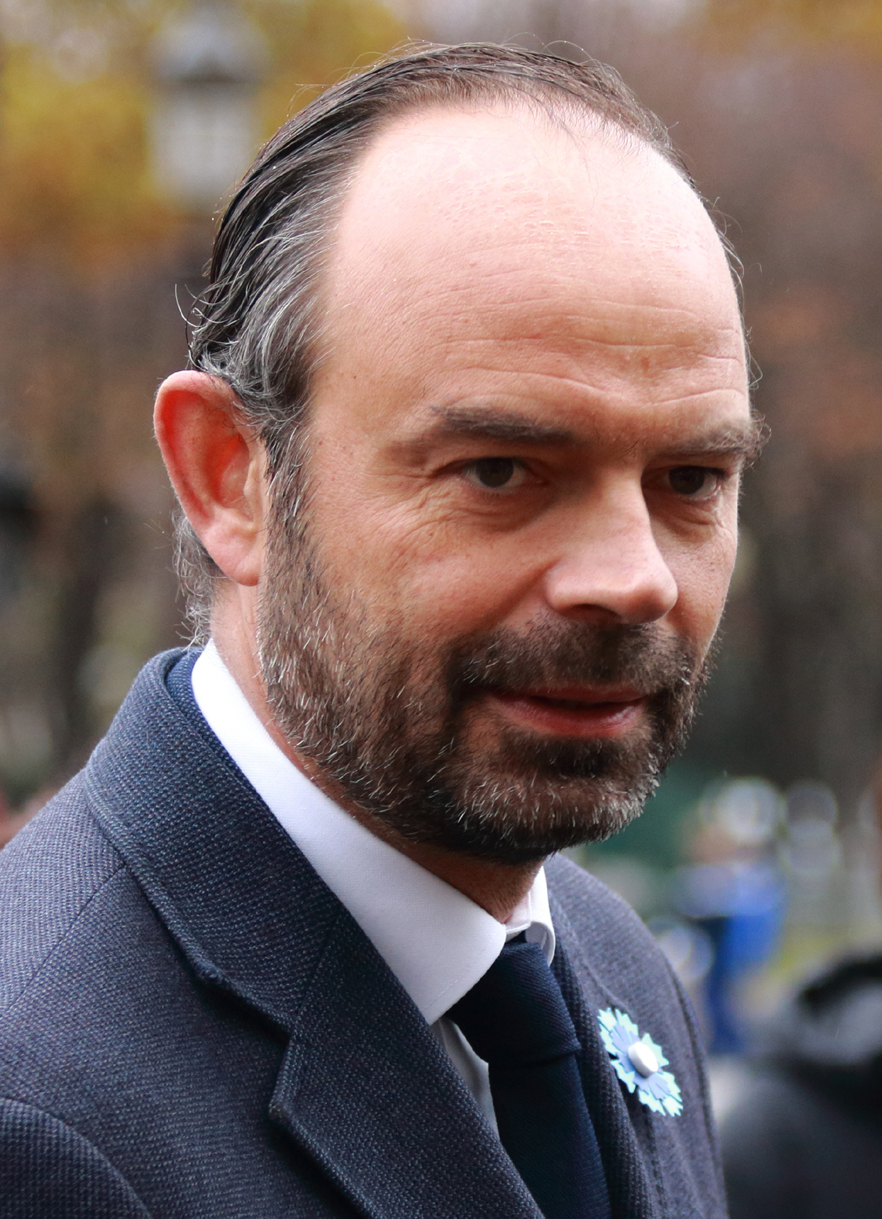

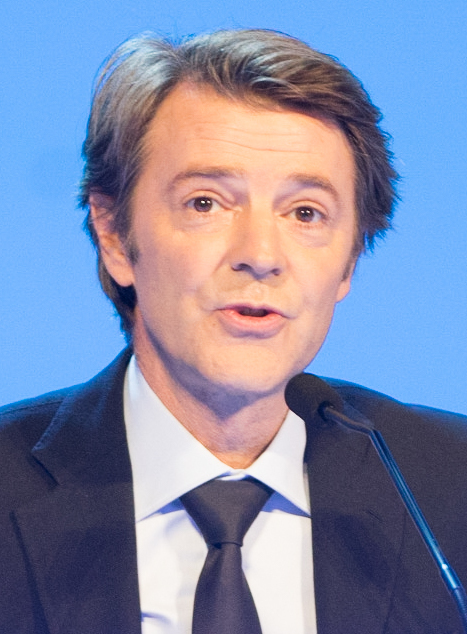

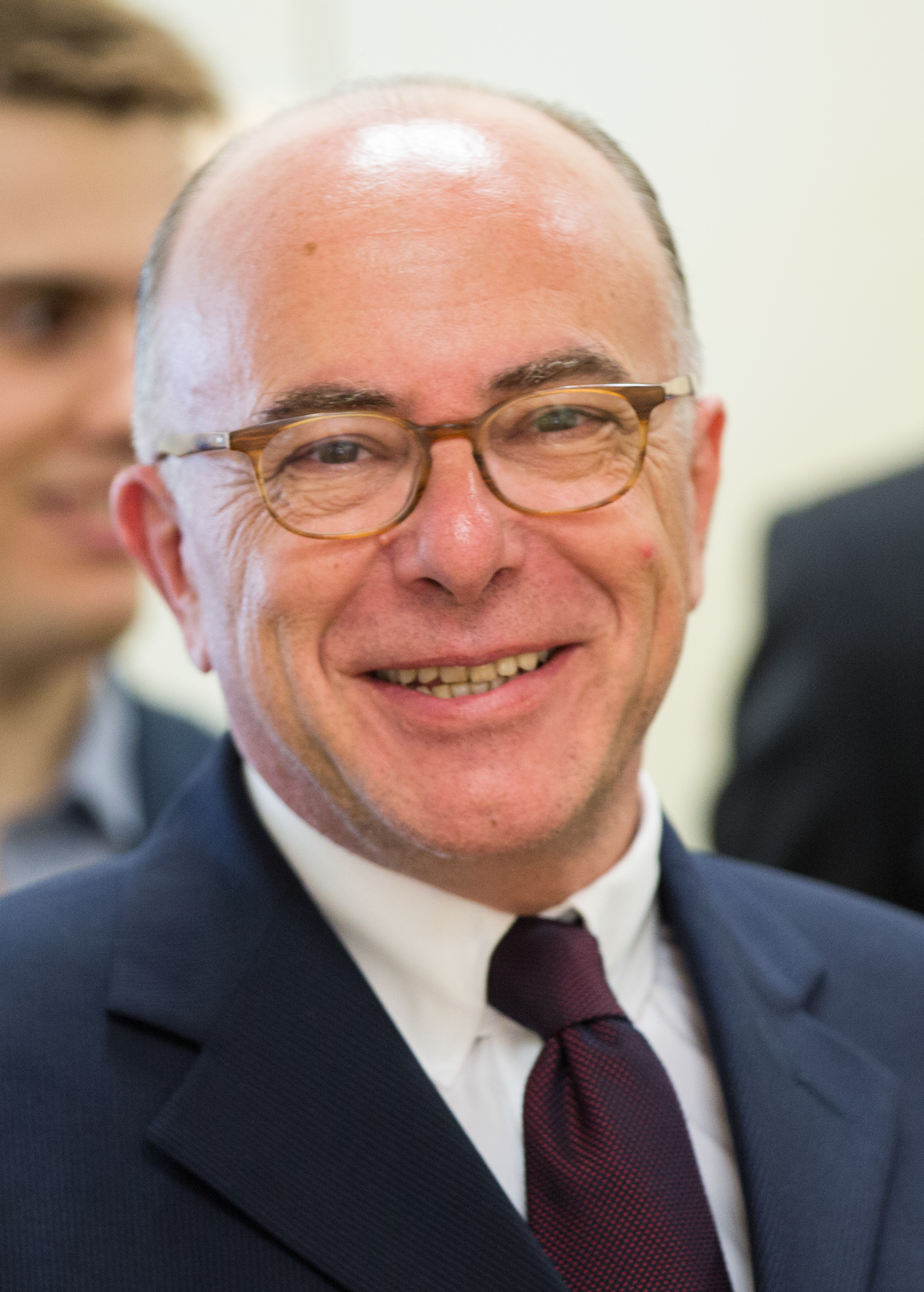

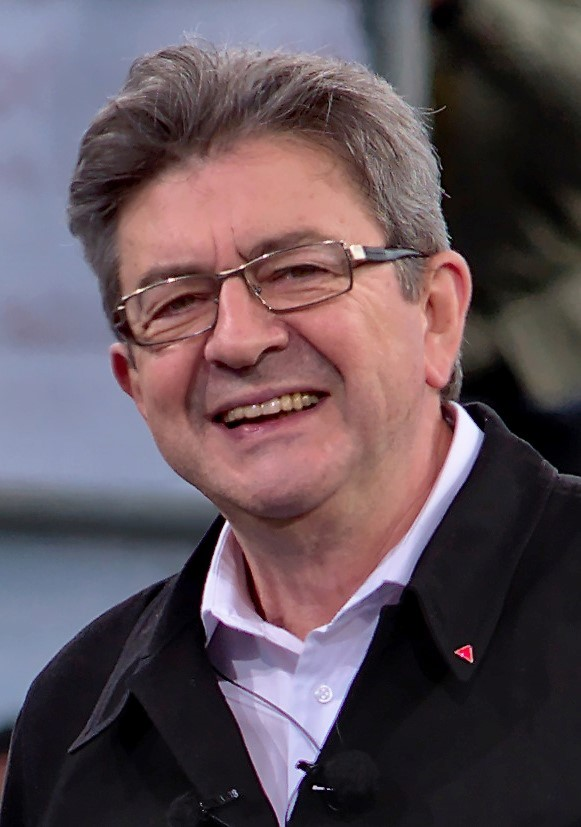

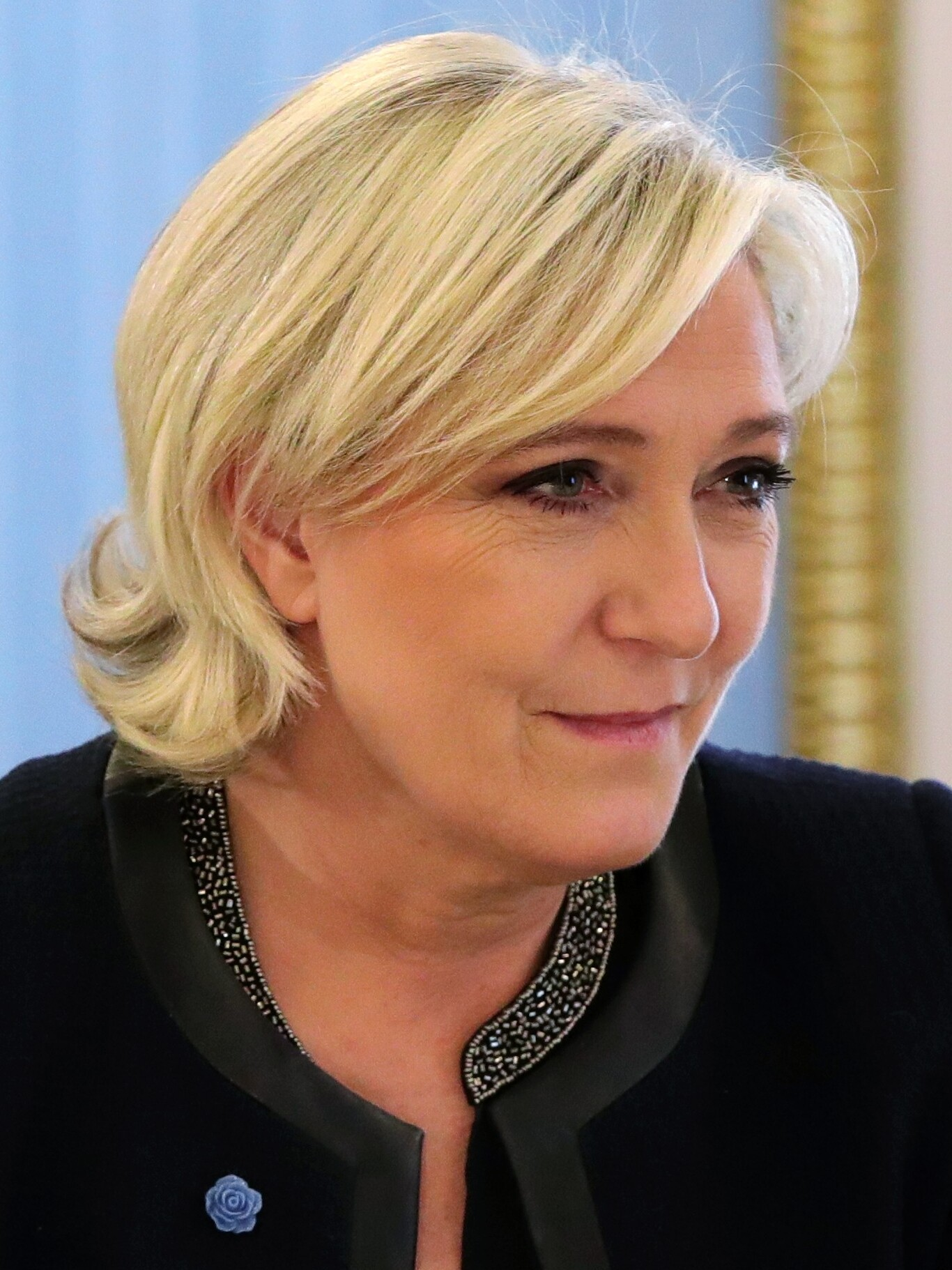
	First party	Second party	Third party
Leader	Édouard Philippe	François Baroin	Bernard Cazeneuve
Party	LREM	LR	PS
Alliance	Presidential majority Parties: LREM; MoDem; MDP	UDC	Parliamentary left Parties: PS; PRG; MRC; PPM
Leader's seat	Did not stand (Note: Was the outgoing MP for Seine-Maritime's 7th, but did not seek re-election)	Did not stand	Did not stand
Last election	Did not contest	237 seats, 27.1%	314 seats, 29.4%
Seats won	350	136	45
Seat change	▲350	▼101	▼269
1st round %	7,323,496; 32.3% ▲32.3%	4,885,997; 21.6% ▼13.1%	2,154,269; 9.5% ▼30.4%
2nd round %	8,926,901; 49.1% ▲49.1%	4,898,061; 27.0% ▼11.0%	1,361,190; 7.5% ▼32.4%
	Fourth party	Fifth party
Leader	Jean-Luc Mélenchon	Marine Le Pen
Party	LFI	FN
Leader's seat	Bouches-du-Rhône's 4th	Pas-de-Calais's 11th
Last election	Did not contest	2 seats, 9.3%
Seats won	17	8
Seat change	▲17	▲6
1st round %	2,497,622; 11.0% ▲11.0%	2,990,454; 13.2% ▼0.4%
2nd round %	883,573; 4.9% ▲4.9%	1,590,869; 8.8% ▲5.1%
Prime Minister before election
Édouard Philippe
LR
Elected Prime Minister
Édouard Philippe
DVD

Legislative elections were held in France on 11 and 18 June 2017 (with different dates for voters overseas) to elect the 577 members of the 15th National Assembly of the Fifth Republic. They followed the two-round presidential election won by Emmanuel Macron. The centrist party he founded in 2016, La République En Marche! (LREM), led an alliance with the centrist Democratic Movement (MoDem); together, the two parties won 350 of the 577 seats—a substantial majority—in the National Assembly, including an outright majority of 308 seats for LREM. The Socialist Party (PS) was reduced to 30 seats and the Republicans (LR) reduced to 112 seats, and both parties' allies also suffered from a marked drop in support; these were the lowest-ever scores for the centre-left and centre-right in the legislative elections. The movement founded by Jean-Luc Mélenchon, la France Insoumise (FI), secured 17 seats, enough for a group in the National Assembly. Among other major parties, the French Communist Party (PCF) secured ten and the National Front (FN) obtained eight seats. Both rounds of the legislative election were marked by record low turnout.

In total, 206 MPs lost reelection, and 424 (75%) elected MPs were new members. There was a record number of women elected. The average age of parliamentarians decreased from 54 to 48. Ludovic Pajot from the National Rally became the new Baby of the House, being elected at the age of 23. Édouard Philippe, appointed as Prime Minister by Macron following his victory in the presidential election, was reappointed following the second round of the legislative elections and presented his second government by 21 June. The 15th legislature of the French Fifth Republic commenced on 27 June.

== Background ==
First-place candidate in the first round of the presidential election by constituency Emmanuel Macron Marine Le Pen François Fillon Jean-Luc Mélenchon

In France, legislative elections take place about a month after the second round of the presidential election, held on 7 May. Prior to 2002, the presidential and legislative elections were not always held in the same year; following the victory of the UMP in the 2002 legislative elections, the two were synchronized to minimize the risk of cohabitation.

In the first round of the presidential election, on 23 April, Emmanuel Macron of En Marche! and Marine Le Pen of the National Front (FN) advanced to the runoff after placing first and second, respectively, and were followed closely by François Fillon of the Republicans (LR) and Jean-Luc Mélenchon of la France Insoumise (FI). In the first round, Macron led in 240 constituencies, against 216 for Le Pen, 67 for Mélenchon, and 54 for Fillon.

Macron won the second round on 7 May against Le Pen, securing 66.1% of valid votes.

Upon the close of nominations for the legislative election, the Ministry of the Interior published a final list on 23 May containing a total of 7,882 candidates, with an average of 14 candidates within each constituency.

The 2017 legislative election was the first held after the legal abolition of the dual mandate in France in 2014; deputies will no longer be allowed to concurrently serve in local government, frequently as mayors, upon election to the National Assembly.

== Electoral system ==
The 577 members of the National Assembly are elected using a two-round system with single-member constituencies. Candidates for the legislative elections had five days, from Monday 15 May to 18:00 on Friday 19 May, to declare and register their candidacy. The official campaign ran from 22 May to 10 June at midnight, while the campaign for the second round runs from 12 June at midnight to 17 June at midnight, with eligible candidates required to declare their presence by 18:00 CEST on 13 June. To be elected in the first round, a candidate was required to secure an absolute majority of votes cast, and also to secure votes equal to at least 25% of eligible voters in their constituency. Should none of the candidates satisfy these conditions, a second round of voting ensues. Only first-round candidates with the support of at least 12.5% of eligible voters are allowed to participate, but if only 1 candidate meets that standard the two candidates with the highest number of votes in the first round may continue to the second round. In the 2017 election, four deputies were elected in the first round. In the second round, the candidate with a plurality is elected. Of the 577 constituencies, 539 are in metropolitan France, 27 are in overseas departments and territories and 11 are for French citizens living abroad.

Voting in the first round took place from 08:00 to 18:00 (local time) on Saturday 3 June in French Polynesia and at French diplomatic missions in the Americas, and on Sunday 4 June at French diplomatic missions outside the Americas. Voting in the French overseas departments and territories in the Americas (i.e. French Guiana, Guadeloupe, Martinique, Saint Barthélemy, Saint Martin, and Saint Pierre and Miquelon) took place from 08:00 to 18:00 (local time) on Saturday 10 June. Voting in metropolitan France (as well as the French overseas departments and territories of Mayotte, New Caledonia, Réunion and Wallis and Futuna) took place from 08:00 to 18:00 or 20:00 (local time) on Sunday 11 June.

Voting in the second round took place on Saturday 17 June from 08:00 to 18:00 (local time) in the French overseas departments and territories situated east of the International Date Line and west of metropolitan France (i.e. French Guiana, French Polynesia, Guadeloupe, Martinique, Saint Barthélemy, Saint Martin and Saint Pierre and Miquelon), as well as at French diplomatic missions in the Americas. Voting in metropolitan France (as well as the French overseas departments and territories of Mayotte, New Caledonia, Réunion and Wallis and Futuna, and French diplomatic missions outside the Americas) takes place from 08:00 to 18:00 or 20:00 (local time) on Sunday 18 June.

The 15th National Assembly convened on 27 June at 15:00 CEST.

== Major parties ==
Party		Party leader	Ideology	Political position
French Communist Party	PCF	Pierre Laurent	Communism	Left-wing to far-left
La France Insoumise	FI	Jean-Luc Mélenchon	Democratic socialism	Left-wing to far-left
Socialist Party	PS	Jean-Christophe Cambadélis	Social democracy	Centre-left
Radical Party of the Left	PRG	Sylvia Pinel	Social liberalism	Centre-left
Europe Ecology – The Greens	EELV	David Cormand	Green politics	Centre-left
La République En Marche!	LREM	Richard Ferrand	Social liberalism	Centre
Democratic Movement	MoDem	François Bayrou	Social liberalism	Centre to centre-right
Union of Democrats and Independents	UDI	Jean-Christophe Lagarde	Liberalism	Centre to centre-right
The Republicans	LR	Bernard Accoyer	Liberal conservatism	Centre-right
Debout la France	DLF	Nicolas Dupont-Aignan	Souverainism	Right-wing to far-right
National Front	FN	Marine Le Pen	National conservatism	Far-right

== Campaign ==
=== La République En Marche! and MoDem ===
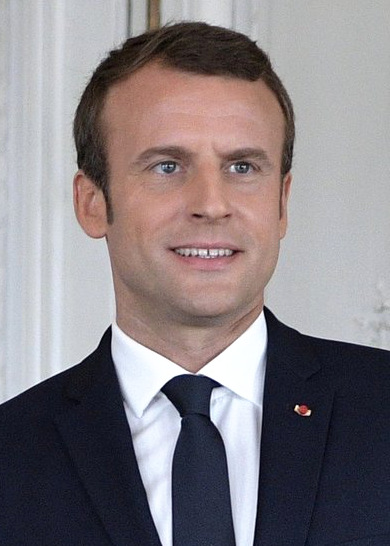
Emmanuel Macron in 2017

En Marche!, the movement founded by Emmanuel Macron, who won the presidential election under its banner, planned to run candidates in all 577 constituencies under the banner of "La République En Marche!", of which at least half were planned to be from civil society – the other half having previously held political office – and half women. No "double investiture" was permitted, though the original requirement of prospective candidates to leave their previous political party was waived by Macron on 5 May. In addition to those parameters, he specified in his initial press conference on 19 January that he would require that candidates demonstrate "probity" (disqualifying any prospective candidates with a criminal record), "political plurality" (representing the threads of the movement), and "efficacy". Those wishing to seek the investiture of En Marche! were required to sign up online, and the movement received nearly 15,000 applications by late April. For nominations sought by those in the political world, the popularity, establishment, and ability to appear in the media of applicants are also considered, with the most difficult cases adjudicated by Macron himself. To represent themselves under the label of La République En Marche!, however, outgoing deputies must decide to leave the Socialist Party (PS) or the Republicans (LR).

After his victory in the presidential election, Macron resigned his post as president of En Marche!, with Catherine Barbaroux appointed as interim president. The movement, renamed, presented candidates under the label of "La République En Marche!"; though the full list of 577 investitures was to be published on 11 May, Jean-Paul Delevoye, president of the investiture commission, later indicated that the total published that day would be "about 450". The delay was attributed to an influx of applications following Macron's victory in the presidential election – more than a thousand, bringing the total to over 16,000 – with additional complexity arising from the interest of former Prime Minister Manuel Valls in standing as a La République En Marche! candidate without either submitting an application or leaving the Socialist Party. Since the announcement that "La République En Marche!" would be transformed into a formal political party, however, the conditions of securing an investiture tightened considerably, with candidates expected to be "administratively" attached to the party to prevent public funding (distributed on the basis of electoral results) from being received by the PS or the Republicans.

The initial list of 428 investitures was revealed on 11 May, with exact gender parity (214 men and 214 women), with 94% of candidates not outgoing deputies; 93% employed, 2% looking for work, 4% retired, 1% students; 52% from civil society; an average age of 46 (the youngest being 24 and oldest being 62), compared to 60 for outgoing deputies; and 24 current deputies, mostly Socialists, invested under the label of La République En Marche! The total number of remaining investitures to be concluded is 148. No candidate was invested against Valls. Numerous candidates were invested in error, including Mourad Boudjellal, François Pupponi, and Augustin Augier, who did not apply; Stéphane Saint-André, an outgoing PRG deputy who renounced his investiture and raised concerns about the potential appointment of Édouard Philippe as prime minister; and Thierry Robert, an outgoing deputy who contravened the requirement of not having a criminal history.

The list was further updated on 15 May with an additional 83 candidates, of which half were proposed by the MoDem, bringing the overall total to 511, and leaving 66 constituencies to be decided, of which about 30 are reserved for figures on the right and left who expressed support for Macron's project and most of the rest constituencies for overseas departments; ultimately, 51 constituencies with outgoing deputies on both the left and right considered "Macron-compatible" were not contested; Delevoye stated that some twenty constituencies for overseas France were frozen due to local party financing peculiarities, with other vacated constituencies for other political personalities apparently interested in joining in the presidential majority.

On 15 May, Édouard Philippe, a deputy of the Republicans, was appointed as prime minister. After the selection of ministers to the newly formed government on 17 May, the movement announced that it would not invest candidates in 56 constituencies, hoping to protect a number of those on the left and right who had expressed support but not rallied, with the possibility of adjustments before the deadline on 19 May. Appointed ministers contesting the legislative elections were obligated to resign if not elected: namely, Christophe Castaner, Marielle de Sarnez, Richard Ferrand, Annick Girardin, Bruno Le Maire, and Mounir Mahjoubi; all six were eventually elected.

==== MoDem ====
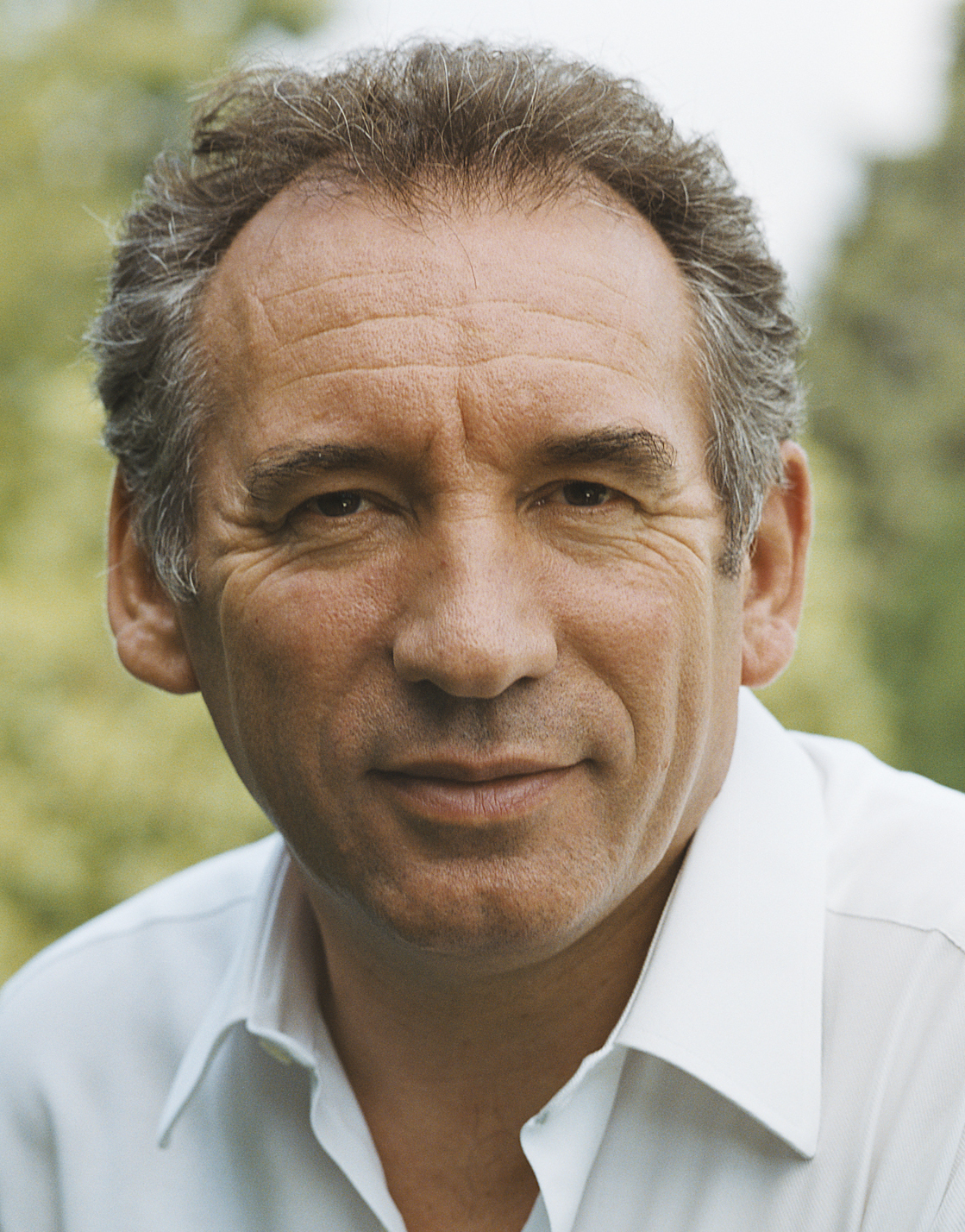
François Bayrou in 2006

After François Bayrou endorsed Macron in February, the Democratic Movement (MoDem), which he leads, was reportedly to receive 90 constituencies, of which 50 were considered winnable, for its candidates. However, hours of the publication of the initial list, Bayrou indicated that it did not have the "approval" of the MoDem, unsatisfied with the number of constituencies for MoDem candidates, and appealed to Macron to permit joint investitures and planned to convene the political bureau of his party on 12 May. He was also unhappy with what he called a "recycling operation of the PS"; according to a tally by MoDem officials, among the 428 investitures announced, 153 were granted to PS/ex-PS/PRG, 38 to the MoDem, 25 to LR or miscellaneous right, 15 to UDI/ex-UDI, and 197 to civil society figures. On 12 May, Bayrou announced that he had secured a "solid and balanced" draft agreement, claiming that his party would ultimately obtain a bit more than a hundred investitures. A MoDem candidate replaced Gaspard Gantzer, former communications advisor to Hollande, in Ille-et-Vilaine's 2nd constituency after fierce objections by local activists and his renunciation of the investiture, which he claimed he did not apply for, and mayor of Mont-de-Marsan Geneviève Darrieussecq and Senator Leila Aïchi, both members of the MoDem executive bureau, received investitures.

Bayrou's party hopes to elect at least 15 deputies, necessary for the formation of a parliamentary group in the National Assembly; additionally, to be reimbursed for expenses, the party must receive at least 1% of the vote in at least 50 constituencies where it is present. Public financing is also allocated as a function of the number of elected officials, hence the ambitions of the MoDem.

=== The Republicans (LR) and UDI ===
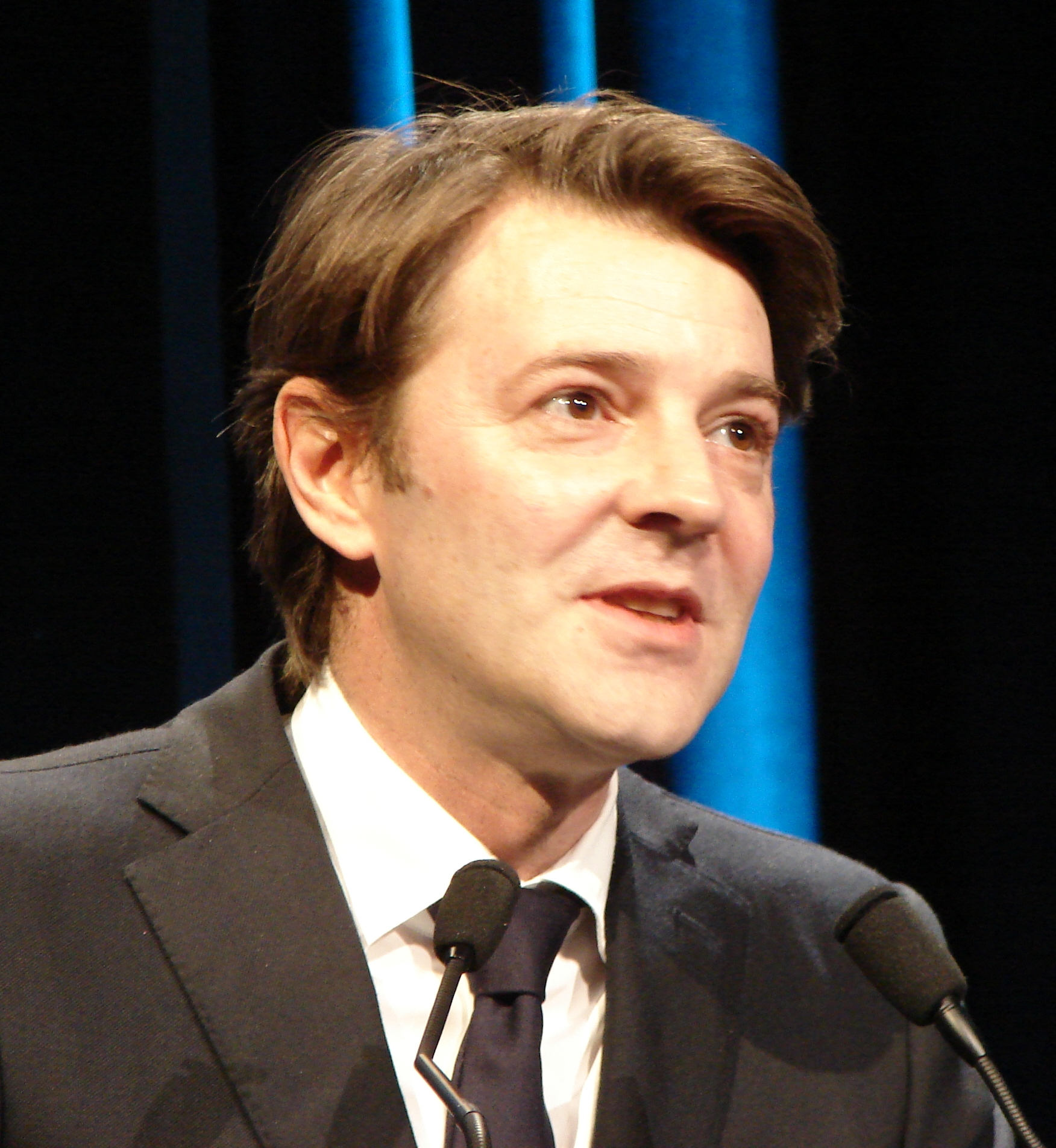
François Baroin in 2012

On 2 May, François Baroin was appointed by the political bureau of the Republicans (LR) to head the campaign for the legislative elections. A week before, he said that he would be available to serve as Prime Minister in a cohabitation government under Emmanuel Macron and considered it impossible not to run on the same program as its defeated presidential candidate François Fillon, who was eliminated in the first round of the presidential election, in the legislative elections. Baroin has indicated pessimism with regard to the prospects of the Republicans in the legislative elections, saying "At 150 [seats] is good. From 100 to 150 is not bad. Below 100 is a failure." The platform of the Republicans for the legislative election, published on 10 May, breaks with that of its defeated Fillon, who was eliminated in the first round, on several points. Though it preserved the plans to eliminate the 35-hour workweek and reform to the solidarity tax on wealth (ISF) on which he campaigned, it differed on terrorism, immigration, family, and European policy. The party ran in alliance with the Union of Democrats and Independents (UDI), whose executive bureau on 7 March approved an accord with the Republicans reserving them 96 constituencies, including the 28 seats currently held by outgoing deputies, and preparing primaries in 42 constituencies between UDI and LR candidates.

On 15 May, some 173 LR and UDI elected officials and personalities, including Jean-Louis Borloo, Nathalie Kosciusko-Morizet, Christian Estrosi, and Thierry Solère, appealed to their fellows to "respond to the hand extended by the president", after which the Republicans published a counter-appeal, insisting that "France needs more than ever a majority of the right and centre in the National Assembly".

On 20 May, Baroin launched the campaign of the Republicans at the Bois de Vincennes, determined to impose cohabitation upon Macron and provide him with the "majority needed by France", a goal complicated by the inclusion of LR personalities in the formation the cabinet, and principally by the selection of Édouard Philippe as Prime Minister. In his speech, Baroin made his case for a "majority without ambiguity, without pretense. A real majority and not a majority of circumstances, meetings, and personal ambitions", describing the legislative elections before an audience of nearly 2,000 as "the mother of battles". Meanwhile, the appointment of three LR personalities as ministers in the government – Édouard Philippe, Bruno Le Maire, and Gérald Darmanin – in its attempt at a recomposition of politics infringed upon the space occupied by the party. Emphasizing that many mobilized merely against Le Pen and not for Macron, he wielded the party's program, borrowing elements from that of Fillon's.

=== National Front (FN) ===
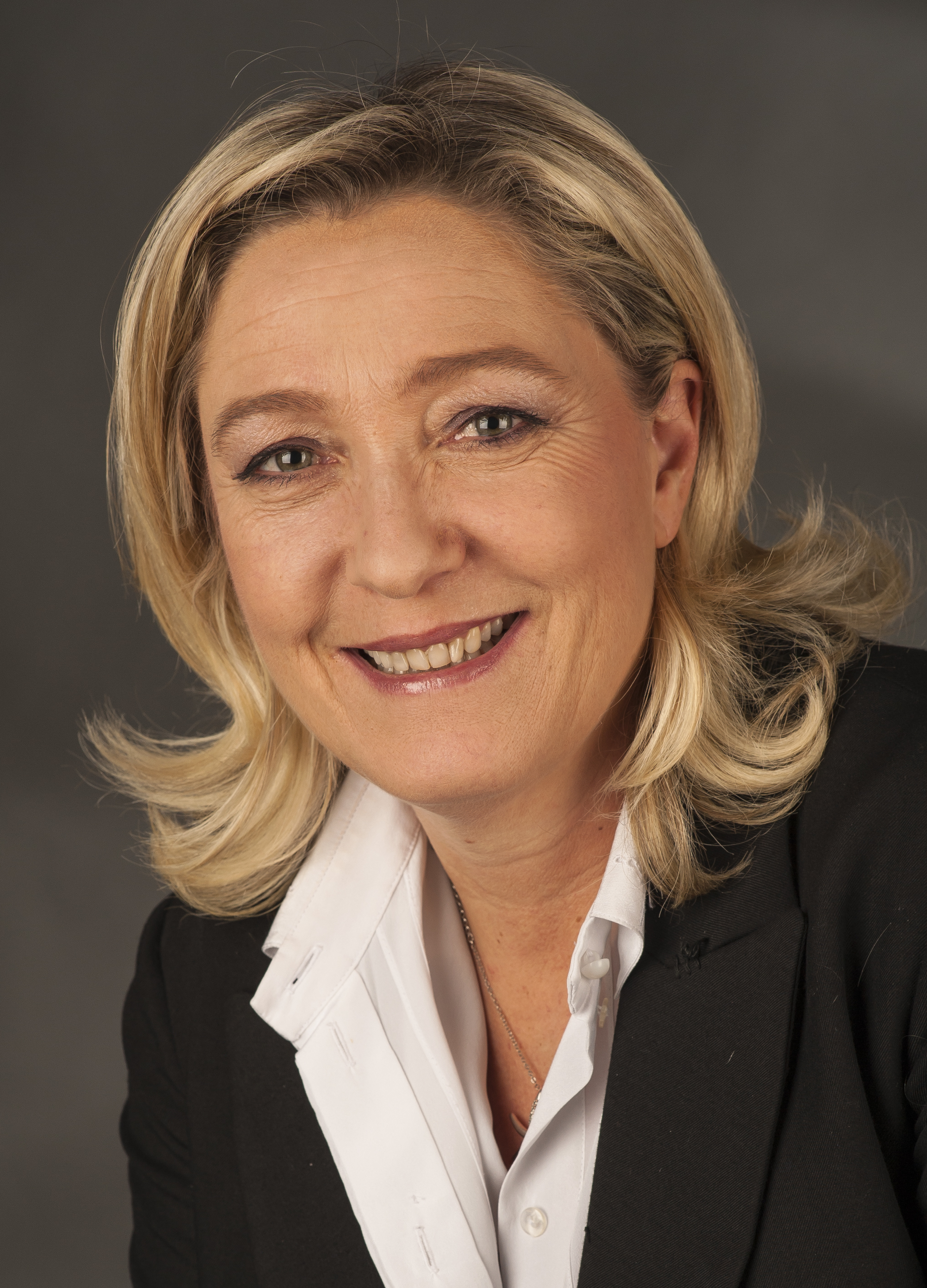
Marine Le Pen in 2014

The National Front (FN), led by Marine Le Pen, ended its pre-investitures for the legislative elections in December 2016. The average age of the candidates is 47 years, with near-gender parity and almost 80% of candidates already having a local mandate (i.e., within a municipal, departmental, or regional council), compared to a rate of barely 10% in 2012. Some 50 constituencies were planned to be possibly contested by joint candidacies with Debout la France (DLF) following the rallying of Nicolas Dupont-Aignan to Le Pen after the second round of the presidential election, but on 14 May the FN announced the suspension of the agreement, intending to invest candidates in all 577 constituencies as a result, reversing the "principle of accord" on joint investitures that had been agreed upon earlier. The FN ran a candidate against Dupont-Aignan, the sitting deputy for Essonne's 8th constituency. Outgoing deputy Marion Maréchal-Le Pen announced her intention to leave politics on 9 May, and as such did not run in the legislative elections.

Among the list of 553 candidates already invested by the FN include Florian Philippot in Moselle's 6th, Gilbert Collard in Gard's 2nd, Stéphane Ravier in Bouches-du-Rhône's 3rd, Wallerand de Saint-Just in Paris's 13th, and Sophie Montel in Doubs's 4th. Of the 553 candidates in the initial list, 86% are candidates not previously invested in 2012, with nearly 70% holding at least one elected office. The expulsion of Jean-Marie Le Pen from the party in August 2015 was followed by the departure of a number of his companions, who as a result were not invested as candidates. A number of mayors elected in the 2014 municipal elections chose not to stand in order to retain their local mandates, including Julien Sanchez in Beaucaire, Franck Briffaut in Villers-Cotterêts, and David Rachline in Fréjus. The alliance with the small party of Paul-Marie Coûteaux, Sovereignty, Identity and Freedoms (SIEL), was broken in 2016; the party in 2012 provided 34 of the candidates invested by the FN.

Le Pen herself was reluctant to introduce herself as a candidate after her defeat in the presidential election, with initial hopes of 80 to 100 deputies within the FN revised sharply downwards to 15 target constituencies. On 18 May, she confirmed that she would once again run in Pas-de-Calais's 11th constituency (where she lost by a hundred votes to Philippe Kemel in 2012), which includes Hénin-Beaumont (whose mayor is Steeve Briois of the FN) and where she received 58.2% of votes in the second round of the presidential election. Following the announcement, her father Jean-Marie Le Pen decided not to present a candidate under the banner of the "Union of Patriots", an alliance of far-right movements presenting 200 candidates across France, in the constituency.

Following the victory of Macron in the presidential election, Le Pen stated that she did not deem the proposed reform of the labour code as a priority, criticizing the planned usage of ordonnances as a coup de force and believing that amending it to allow greater flexibility was nothing more than a demand of large employers. She also further critiqued the plans as the El Khomri law "times a thousand", but calling not for demonstrations on the streets but a vote for the FN.

=== La France Insoumise (FI) ===
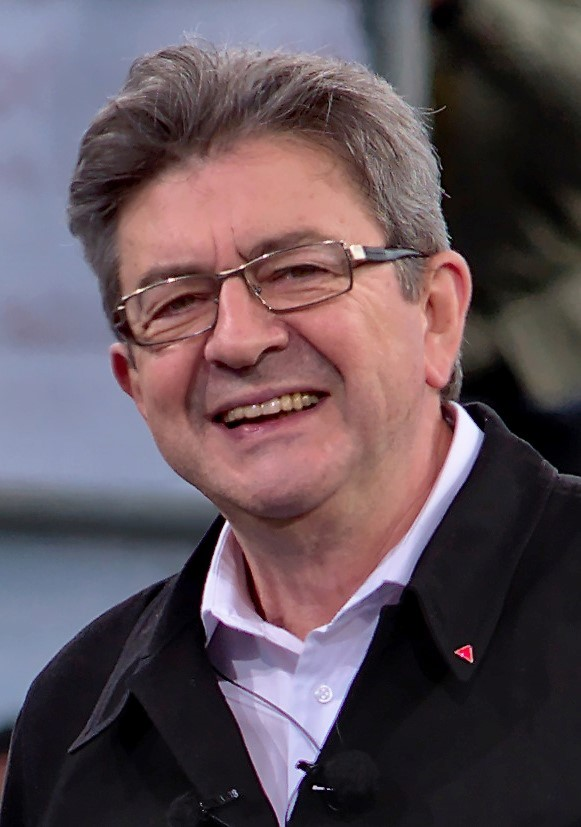
Jean-Luc Mélenchon in 2017

La France Insoumise, the political movement launched by Jean-Luc Mélenchon, former co-president of the Left Party (PG) who ran as a presidential candidate in both 2012 and 2017, intended to run candidates in all 577 constituencies. In a list of 410 investitures published in mid-February, gender parity was maintained, 60% of candidates came from civil society, and the average age was only 43 years, with the youngest at 19 years old. Candidates were selected after the national committee reviewed online applications of prospects.

The constituencies contested by the movement included some held or contested by members of the French Communist Party (PCF). Relations deteriorated between the two, and in early May la France Insoumise proposed that the groupings withdraw competing candidacies in 26 constituencies. However, on 9 May, campaign spokesman Manuel Bompard said that there would be no accord between the two parties in the legislative elections and blamed the PCF for the failure to reach an agreement.

On 11 May, Mélenchon announced that he would stand as a candidate in Bouches-du-Rhône's 4th constituency in a letter addressed to the adherents of his movement in Marseille, where the riding is located; he came first in the city during the first round of the presidential election, with almost 25% of the vote, and in the constituency he received 39.09%, far ahead of both Macron and Le Pen and one of his best scores nationally. The constituency was then held by Socialist deputy Patrick Mennucci, considered a "friend" by Mélenchon himself.

=== Socialist Party (PS) and allies ===
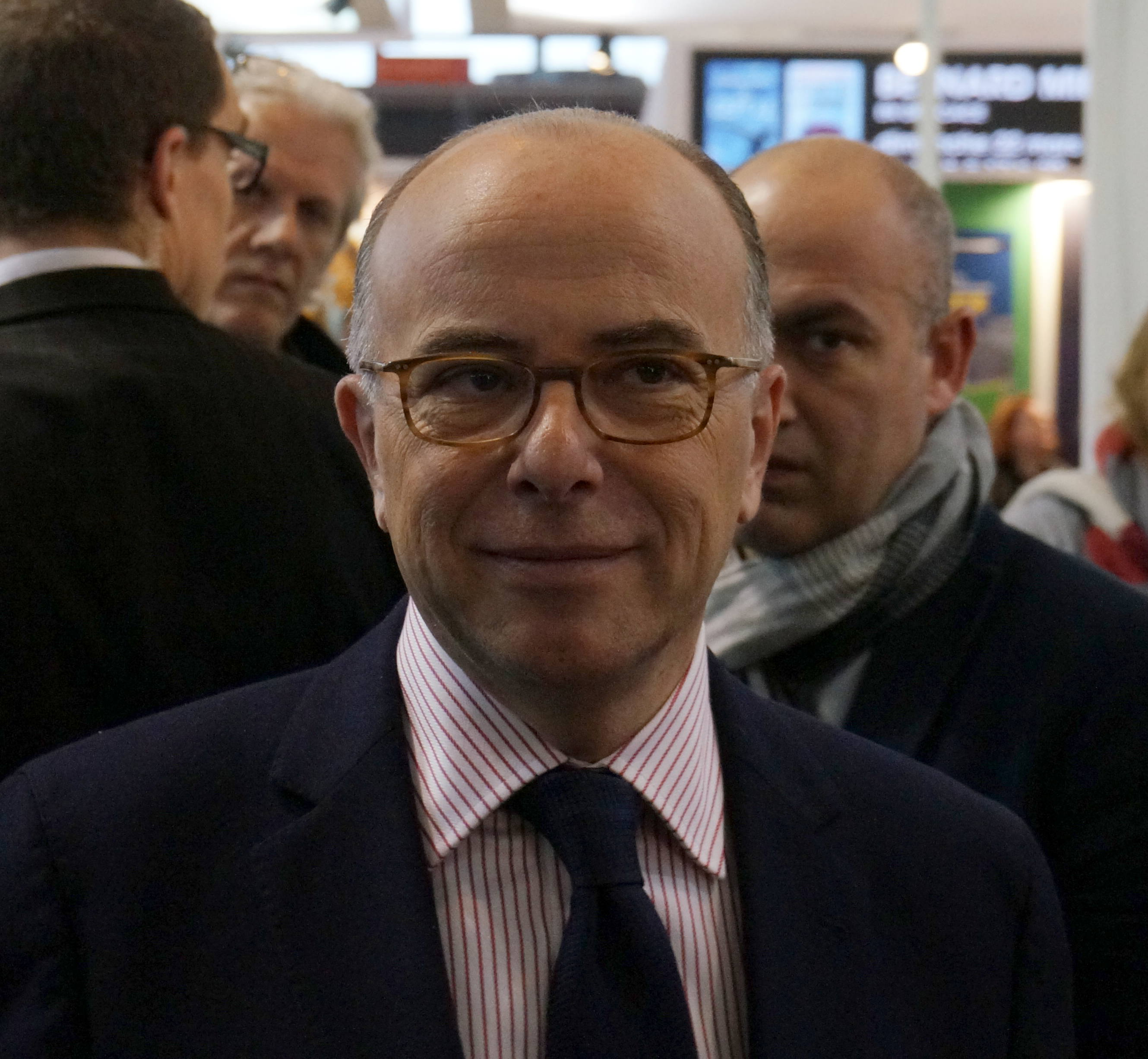
Bernard Cazeneuve

The first wave of 395 Socialist candidates for the legislative elections was invested on 17 December 2016, including a number who supported the candidacy of Emmanuel Macron in the presidential election, such as Alain Calmette in Cantal's 1st, Olivier Véran in Isère's 1st, Jean-Louis Touraine in Rhône's 3rd, Corinne Erhel in Côtes-d'Armor's 5th, Richard Ferrand in Finistère's 6th, Jean-Jacques Bridey in Val-de-Marne's 7th, Stéphane Travert in Manche's 3rd, and Christophe Castaner in Alpes-de-Haute-Provence's 2nd constituency. Of the outgoing deputies invested by La République En Marche!, Frédéric Barbier, deputy for Doubs's 4th constituency, was the only one to also remain invested by the PS; Christophe Borgel, national secretary of elections for the Socialist Party, stated that Barbier would retain his investiture as he was the "best to fight the National Front".

The party presented its own candidates in more than 400 constituencies, with the rest reserved for its allies Europe Ecology – The Greens (EELV), the Union of Democrats and Ecologists (UDE), and the Radical Party of the Left (PRG). First Secretary Jean-Christophe Cambadélis also indicated that the PS hoped to open discussions with la France Insoumise and En Marche! for agreements in constituencies where Le Pen obtained more than 60 percent of the vote in the second round of the presidential election, as well as in ridings in which the second round of the legislative elections could foreseeably be fought between the right and the FN.

On 9 May, the national bureau of the Socialist Party approved its three-page platform for the legislative elections entitled "a clear contract for France, a constructive and solidary left". It abandoned many of the proposals of its defeated presidential candidate Benoît Hamon and drew a number of red lines with regard to the program of Emmanuel Macron, refusing to allow the reform of the labour code by ordonnance and abolition of the solidarity tax on wealth (ISF) on non-property assets. Former Prime Minister Bernard Cazeneuve led the campaign for the legislative elections.

Hamon himself chose to support candidates running against prominent reformists invested by the Socialist Party, backing Michel Nouaille of the French Communist Party (PCF) against former Prime Minister Manuel Valls, whom he defeated in the presidential primary; the feminist Caroline de Haas of EELV/PCF against Myriam El Khomri, namesake of her labour law; Philippe Rio of the PCF against Malek Boutih, a Socialist running under the banner of the presidential majority (having been denied an investiture) who violently denounced Hamon as a candidate who would "resonate with a fringe Islamic-leftist"; and Salah Amokrane of the EELV against Gérard Bapt, who made a controversial trip to Syria with three other parliamentarians in 2015.

In an interview on 22 May, Cambadélis envisaged a potential renaming of the PS, stating that the party should "refound, reformulate, and restructure" to respond to the demand for the "renewal, social justice and ecology", after previously resisting the idea in 2014 when the possibility was mentioned by Valls while prime minister.

=== Europe Ecology – The Greens (EELV) ===
In exchange for the withdrawal of ecologist candidate Yannick Jadot in the presidential election in favor of Socialist candidate Benoît Hamon in February, the PS agreed to reserve 42 constituencies for the EELV (including all those of its outgoing deputies), and the accord was formally approved by EELV on 19 April. The agreement also provided that the EELV did not present candidates in 53 constituencies. The investiture of former housing minister Cécile Duflot was maintained despite the opposition of mayor of Paris Anne Hidalgo, as was that of Sergio Coronado, who supported Jean-Luc Mélenchon in the presidential election; however, he nevertheless faced a Socialist candidate in the legislative elections. Many of the remaining constituencies are those of Socialist deputies who backed Emmanuel Macron in the presidential election.

On 15 May, the EELV revealed its list of candidates for the legislative elections, investing 459 candidates (228 men and 231 women) and supporting 52 Socialists, 16 Communists, and François Ruffin under the banner of la France Insoumise. From the ranks of the party's leaders, national secretary David Cormand presented himself in Seine-Maritime's 4th, deputy national secretary Sandrine Rousseau in Pas-de-Calais's 9th, and spokesperson Julien Bayou in Paris's 5th.

=== French Communist Party (PCF) ===
Though the French Communist Party (PCF) formally supported the candidacy of Jean-Luc Mélenchon in the presidential election, it still ran its own candidates in the legislative elections. After Mélenchon's defeat in the first round of the presidential election, Pierre Laurent once again called for an alliance with la France Insoumise. Negotiations between the two failed to produce an agreement, and on 9 May la France Insoumise announced that it would continue on in the legislative elections without allying with the PCF. PCF candidates who sponsored the candidacy of Mélenchon in the presidential election did not face any opposing candidate from la France Insoumise. The PCF and FI were face-to-face in almost all constituencies, with the PCF planning to invest 535 candidates and FI almost as many, though the possibility of a withdrawal from 20 or so constituencies remained. On 16 May, the PCF published a list of 484 candidates invested in the legislative elections, refraining from appearing in a number of constituencies in favor of candidates from la France Insoumise, EELV, PS, or Ensemble! (Clémentine Autain). According to the PCF, 40% of its candidates were younger than 50, and 20% younger than 40, with an average age of 51; a quarter were retired, 26% employees, 20% civil servants, and 7% manual workers. PCF candidates campaigned under the label of "PCF–Front de Gauche".

=== Debout la France (DLF) ===
Debout la France (Arise France; abbreviated as DLF), led by former presidential candidate Nicolas Dupont-Aignan, intended to present candidates in all 577 constituencies; despite Dupont-Aignan's support of Le Pen in the second round, he reiterated that DLF candidates would face those of the FN, and the national council of Debout la France stated on 13 May that it would invest candidates in almost all constituencies, negotiations with the FN having failed upon the issue of joint investitures.

=== Others ===
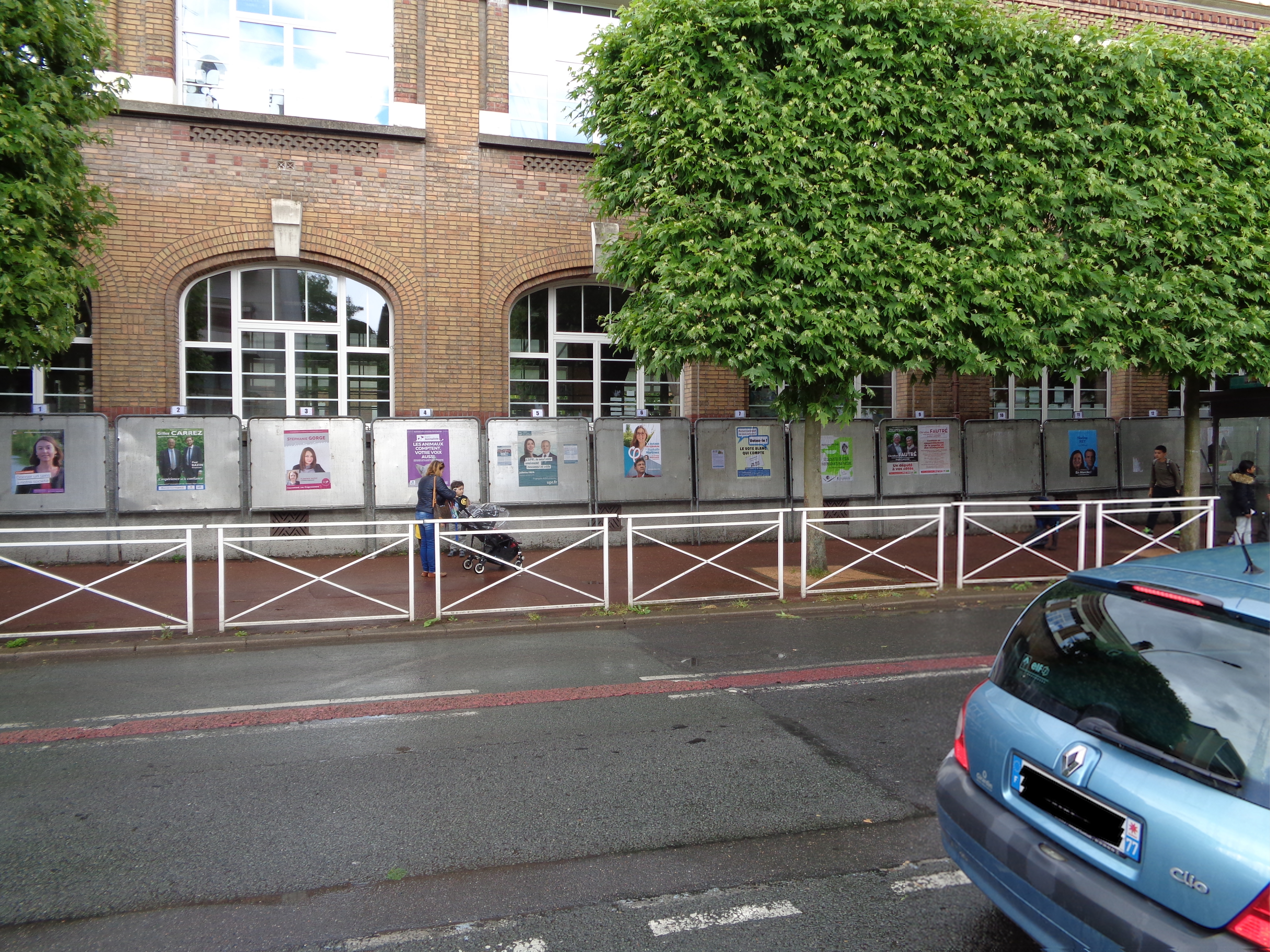
Official campaign posters in the Val-de-Marne's 5th constituency

Lutte Ouvrière (Workers' Struggle; abbreviated as LO) presented candidates in 553 constituencies, with 539 in metropolitan France, six in Réunion, four in Martinique, and four in Guadeloupe; presidential candidate Nathalie Arthaud contested Seine-Saint-Denis's 6th constituency, where she received 3% in the 2012 legislative elections. In terms of financing, the party accumulated some €2 million to cover costs. The New Anticapitalist Party (NPA) was unlikely to present candidates in the legislative elections due to the potentially high cost for the party, as campaign expenses are reimbursed only if a party's candidates attain 1% in at least 50 constituencies. Mouvement 100%, a coalition of 28 parties, including the Independent Ecological Alliance (AEI), planned to present candidates in all 577 constituencies. The Popular Republican Union (UPR) of François Asselineau planned to present candidates in all 577 constituencies, with 574 ultimately invested.

Alliance Royale (AR) presented candidates in 20 constituencies.

== Opinion polls ==
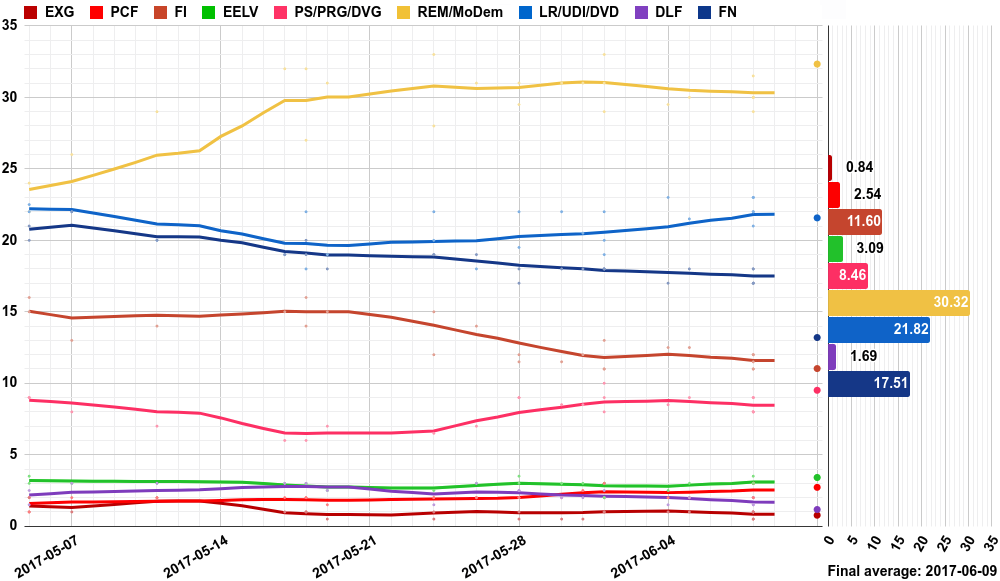

== Results ==
=== National results ===
Party or alliance		First round			Second round			Total seats	+/–
Party or alliance		Votes	%	Seats	Votes	%	Seats	Total seats	+/–
Presidential majority	La République En Marche!	6,391,269	28.21	2	7,826,245	43.06	306	308	New
Presidential majority	Democratic Movement	932,227	4.12	0	1,100,656	6.06	42	42	New
Presidential majority	Total	7,323,496	32.33	2	8,926,901	49.11	348	350	New
Parliamentary right	The Republicans	3,573,427	15.77	0	4,040,203	22.23	112	112	–82
Parliamentary right	Union of Democrats and Independents	687,225	3.03	1	551,784	3.04	17	18	–10
Parliamentary right	Miscellaneous right	625,345	2.76	0	306,074	1.68	6	6	–9
Parliamentary right	Total	4,885,997	21.57	1	4,898,061	26.95	135	136	–101
National Front		2,990,454	13.20	0	1,590,869	8.75	8	8	+6
La France Insoumise		2,497,622	11.03	0	883,573	4.86	17	17	New
Parliamentary left	Socialist Party	1,685,677	7.44	0	1,032,842	5.68	30	30	–250
Parliamentary left	Miscellaneous left	362,281	1.60	1	263,488	1.45	11	12	–10
Parliamentary left	Radical Party of the Left	106,311	0.47	0	64,860	0.36	3	3	–9
Parliamentary left	Total	2,154,269	9.51	1	1,361,190	7.49	44	45	–269
Ecologists (Note: Seat won by Europe Ecology – The Greens.)		973,527	4.30	0	23,197	0.13	1	1	0
French Communist Party		615,487	2.72	0	217,833	1.20	10	10	+3
Miscellaneous		500,309	2.21	0	100,574	0.55	3	3	–10
Debout la France		265,420	1.17	0	17,344	0.10	1	1	New
Regionalists		204,049	0.90	0	137,490	0.76	5	5	+3
Far-left		175,214	0.77	0				0	0
Far-right (Note: Seat won by League of the South)		68,320	0.30	0	19,034	0.10	1	1	0
Total		22,654,164	100.00	4	18,176,066	100.00	573	577	0
Valid votes		22,654,164	97.78		18,176,066	90.14			
Invalid votes		156,326	0.67		578,765	2.87			
Blank votes		357,018	1.54		1,409,784	6.99			
Total votes		23,167,508	100.00		20,164,615	100.00			
Registered voters/turnout		47,570,988	48.70		47,293,103	42.64			
Source: Ministry of the Interior

Popular vote (first round)
LREM	28.21%
LR	15.77%
FN	13.20%
FI	11.03%
PS	7.44%
Ecologists	4.30%
MoDem	4.12%
UDI	3.03%
DVD	2.76%
PCF	2.72%
Miscellaneous	2.21%
DVG	1.60%
DLF	1.17%
Regionalists	0.90%
Far-left	0.77%
PRG	0.47%
Far-right	0.30%

Popular vote of combined forces (first round)
LREM/MoDem	32.33%
LR/UDI/DVD	21.56%
FN	13.20%
FI	11.03%
PS/PRG/DVG	9.51%
Ecologists	4.30%
PCF	2.72%
Miscellaneous	2.21%
DLF	1.17%
Regionalists	0.90%
Far-left	0.77%
Far-right	0.30%

Popular vote of combined forces (second round)
LREM/MoDem	49.12%
LR/UDI/DVD	26.95%
FN	8.75%
PS/PRG/DVG	7.49%
FI	4.86%
PCF	1.20%
Regionalists	0.76%
Miscellaneous	0.55%
Ecologists	0.13%
DLF	0.10%
Far-right	0.10%

Seats won
LREM/MoDem	60.66%
LR/UDI/DVD	23.57%
PS/PRG/DVG	7.80%
FI	2.95%
PCF	1.73%
FN	1.39%
Regionalists	0.87%
Miscellaneous	0.52%
Ecologists	0.17%
DLF	0.17%
Far-right	0.17%

=== First round ===
Four deputies were elected in the first round: Sylvain Maillard (LREM) in Paris's 1st, Paul Molac (LREM) in Morbihan's 4th, Napole Polutele (DVG) in Wallis and Futuna's 1st, and Stéphane Demilly of the UDI in Somme's 5th constituencies.

In the remaining 573 constituencies, it was determined that there would be 572 two-way contests in the second round, and only one three-way contest (triangulaire), in Aube's 1st constituency, involving LREM, LR, and the FN.

In Aveyron's 2nd constituency, the candidate of the Republicans later withdrew and backed that of LREM.

==== Electorate ====
Because the Ministry of the Interior did not report results separately for EELV, the "total vote" percentage listed below is for all ecologist candidates.

Sociology of the electorate
Demographic	EXG	PCF	FI	EELV	PS/PRG/DVG	LREM/MoDem	LR/UDI/DVD	DLF	FN	Others	Turnout
Total vote	0.8%	2.7%	11.0%	4.3%	9.5%	32.3%	21.6%	1.2%	13.2%	3.4%	48.7%
First-round vote in the 2017 presidential election
Jean-Luc Mélenchon	0%	11%	55%	4%	9%	14%	2%	0%	1%	4%	47%
Benoît Hamon	2%	5%	7%	13%	49%	17%	3%	0%	0%	4%	57%
Emmanuel Macron	1%	1%	2%	2%	12%	74%	6%	0%	0%	2%	62%
François Fillon	0%	0%	1%	1%	1%	21%	70%	0%	4%	2%	62%
Marine Le Pen	1%	1%	1%	0%	5%	5%	7%	2%	77%	1%	43%
Political party
EXG	32%	13%	34%	3%	0%	4%	2%	0%	3%	9%	55%
FG	0%	22%	55%	1%	7%	9%	2%	1%	1%	2%	54%
EELV	0%	0%	19%	32%	5%	25%	1%	0%	0%	18%	49%
PS	0%	1%	8%	5%	46%	35%	2%	0%	0%	3%	61%
LREM	0%	0%	2%	2%	5%	83%	6%	0%	0%	2%	61%
MoDem	0%	0%	4%	1%	8%	66%	18%	1%	1%	1%	59%
UDI	0%	0%	1%	0%	2%	36%	58%	0%	0%	3%	62%
LR	0%	0%	0%	1%	0%	18%	75%	0%	3%	3%	60%
FN	0%	1%	3%	0%	3%	2%	4%	1%	84%	2%	44%
None	2%	0%	12%	3%	11%	28%	20%	0%	20%	4%	29%
Self-described political position
Very left-wing	13%	23%	49%	4%	1%	6%	0%	0%	1%	3%	54%
Left-wing	1%	10%	33%	5%	26%	20%	1%	0%	1%	3%	60%
Rather left-wing	1%	5%	13%	5%	24%	44%	2%	1%	2%	3%	57%
Centre	0%	0%	3%	2%	4%	64%	18%	1%	4%	4%	56%
Rather right-wing	0%	0%	2%	0%	1%	44%	44%	2%	4%	3%	55%
Right-wing	0%	0%	0%	0%	0%	18%	61%	2%	18%	1%	61%
Very right-wing	0%	2%	0%	0%	2%	0%	11%	4%	81%	0%	55%
Neither left nor right	1%	0%	10%	3%	12%	28%	12%	0%	30%	4%	33%
Left subtotal	2%	9%	25%	5%	22%	30%	2%	0%	2%	3%	58%
Right subtotal	0%	0%	1%	0%	1%	26%	46%	2%	22%	2%	57%
Sex
Men	1%	4%	11%	2%	11%	33%	20%	1%	15%	2%	47%
Women	0%	3%	11%	4%	10%	31%	23%	1%	13%	4%	51%
Age
18–24 years old	0%	2%	18%	5%	10%	32%	11%	3%	14%	5%	37%
25–34 years old	1%	1%	21%	6%	10%	33%	9%	2%	13%	4%	35%
35–49 years old	1%	3%	10%	3%	10%	29%	17%	0%	23%	4%	43%
50–59 years old	1%	3%	14%	5%	11%	34%	15%	1%	14%	2%	50%
60–69 years old	1%	5%	7%	2%	8%	33%	28%	1%	10%	5%	63%
70 or older	0%	3%	6%	1%	11%	33%	34%	1%	10%	1%	66%
Socio-occupational classification
Manager/professional	2%	0%	11%	5%	15%	36%	22%	1%	5%	3%	55%
Intermediate occupation	0%	4%	17%	5%	10%	34%	14%	1%	11%	4%	45%
White-collar worker	1%	1%	14%	3%	6%	29%	15%	3%	22%	6%	39%
Blue-collar worker	4%	3%	11%	4%	8%	26%	14%	0%	29%	1%	34%
Retired	0%	4%	7%	1%	10%	34%	30%	1%	10%	3%	64%
Employment status
Employee	1%	3%	13%	4%	10%	32%	16%	1%	16%	4%	43%
Private employee	2%	4%	10%	3%	8%	35%	17%	1%	16%	4%	39%
Public employee	0%	2%	18%	5%	13%	27%	15%	1%	16%	3%	49%
Self-employed	2%	0%	9%	3%	10%	28%	23%	2%	22%	1%	46%
Unemployed	0%	0%	18%	2%	9%	32%	14%	3%	20%	2%	43%
Education
Less than baccalauréat	1%	4%	8%	2%	10%	28%	23%	1%	21%	2%	46%
Baccalauréat	1%	4%	13%	2%	10%	31%	20%	1%	14%	4%	46%
Bac +2	0%	2%	13%	4%	9%	36%	21%	1%	9%	5%	51%
At least bac +3	1%	2%	12%	4%	11%	38%	21%	1%	7%	3%	56%
Monthly household income
Less than €1,250	3%	6%	13%	4%	11%	17%	16%	1%	25%	4%	41%
€1,250 to €2,000	1%	5%	12%	2%	9%	29%	20%	1%	19%	2%	46%
€2,000 to €3,000	0%	3%	11%	2%	13%	31%	20%	1%	15%	4%	50%
More than €3,000	0%	2%	10%	2%	9%	43%	24%	1%	7%	2%	58%
Moment of choice of vote
In the last few weeks	0%	3%	11%	1%	10%	34%	23%	1%	15%	2%	100%
In the last few days	2%	4%	10%	6%	12%	29%	19%	2%	10%	6%	100%
At the last moment	1%	0%	12%	7%	10%	28%	20%	2%	13%	7%	100%
Agglomeration
Rural	0%	4%	14%	3%	10%	26%	21%	1%	18%	3%	50%
Fewer than 20,000 inhabitants	0%	1%	8%	3%	8%	41%	21%	1%	15%	2%	49%
20,000 to 100,000 inhabitants	1%	3%	10%	3%	12%	36%	19%	0%	14%	2%	48%
More than 100,000 inhabitants	1%	4%	10%	3%	12%	32%	21%	1%	12%	4%	49%
Paris agglomeration	2%	2%	11%	4%	9%	30%	27%	1%	9%	5%	48%
Religion
Catholic	1%	2%	6%	2%	9%	32%	29%	1%	15%	3%	53%
Regular practitioner	0%	1%	2%	1%	0%	40%	37%	2%	14%	3%	67%
Occasional practitioner	0%	1%	3%	3%	10%	29%	38%	1%	13%	2%	57%
Non-practitioner	1%	3%	7%	2%	10%	32%	25%	1%	16%	3%	50%
Others	6%	3%	15%	2%	12%	28%	17%	0%	8%	9%	47%
None	0%	4%	19%	4%	13%	32%	9%	1%	15%	3%	45%
Demographic											Turnout
Demographic	EXG	PCF	FI	EELV	PS/PRG/DVG	LREM/MoDem	LR/UDI/DVD	DLF	FN	Others	Turnout
Sociology of the electorate
Source: Ipsos France

==== Maps ====
Political party of incumbent deputies

Voter turnout in the first round

First round results by commune

Constituencies electing deputies in the first round

Identification of two-way and three-way contests in the second round, together with seats taken in the first round and second-round seats subsequently declared by acclamation

Top candidate in each constituency in the first round

Results in French Polynesia

Results in New Caledonia

Results in Wallis and Futuna

=== Second round ===
Results divided by alliances

==== Electorate ====
LREM/MoDem – LR/UDI/DVD duels (264 constituencies)
1st round vote	LREM/MoDem	LR/UDI/DVD	No vote
FI/PCF	24%	10%	66%
PS/PRG/DVG	45%	15%	40%
EELV	45%	25%	30%
LREM/MoDem	92%	5%	3%
LR/UDI/DVD	4%	93%	3%
FN	11%	41%	48%
Source: Ipsos France

Turnout by demographic group
Demographic	Turnout		
Demographic	Turnout	Total vote	48.7%
First-round vote in the 2017 presidential election
Jean-Luc Mélenchon	39%		
Benoît Hamon	53%		
Emmanuel Macron	58%		
François Fillon	59%		
Marine Le Pen	34%		
First-round legislative election vote
FI	45%		
PS/PRG/DVG	58%		
LREM/MoDem	70%		
LR/UDI/DVD	64%		
FN	44%		
Political party
EXG	20%		
PCF/FI	40%		
EELV	43%		
PS	54%		
LREM	59%		
MoDem	57%		
UDI	59%		
LR	55%		
FN	32%		
None	28%		
Self-described political position
Very left-wing	36%		
Left-wing	50%		
Rather left-wing	53%		
Centre	57%		
Rather right-wing	54%		
Right-wing	55%		
Very right-wing	43%		
Neither left nor right	29%		
Left subtotal	50%		
Right subtotal	52%		
Sex
Men	42%		
Women	45%		
Age
18–24 years old	26%		
25–34 years old	30%		
35–49 years old	38%		
50–59 years old	45%		
60–69 years old	57%		
70 or older	61%		
Socio-occupational classification
Manager/professional	50%		
Intermediate occupation	37%		
White-collar worker	35%		
Blue-collar worker	31%		
Retired	60%		
Employment status
Employee	38%		
Private employee	37%		
Public employee	38%		
Self-employed	38%		
Unemployed	34%		
Education
Less than baccalauréat	44%		
Baccalauréat	37%		
Bac +2	43%		
At least bac +3	50%		
Monthly household income
Less than €1,250	32%		
€1,250 to €2,000	40%		
€2,000 to €3,000	48%		
More than €3,000	50%		
Agglomeration
Rural	44%		
Fewer than 20,000 inhabitants	43%		
20,000 to 100,000 inhabitants	46%		
More than 100,000 inhabitants	41%		
Paris agglomeration	46%		
Religion
Catholic	48%		
Regular practitioner	55%		
Occasional practitioner	55%		
Non-practitioner	45%		
Others	35%		
None	38%		
Demographic	Turnout		
Sociology of the electorate
Source: Ipsos France

==== Maps ====
Party wins by constituency, 1st and 2nd rounds combined

Results in French Polynesia

Results in New Caledonia

=== Results by constituency ===
Constituency		Outgoing deputy	Party	Elected deputy	Party
Ain	1st	Xavier Breton	LR	Xavier Breton	LR
Ain	2nd	Charles de la Verpillière	LR	Charles de la Verpillière	LR
Ain	3rd	Stéphanie Pernod-Beaudon	LR	Olga Givernet	LREM
Ain	4th	Michel Voisin*	LR	Stéphane Trompille	LREM
Ain	5th	Damien Abad	LR	Damien Abad	LR
Aisne	1st	René Dosière*	DVG	Aude Bono-Vandorme	LREM
Aisne	2nd	Julien Dive	LR	Julien Dive	LR
Aisne	3rd	Jean-Louis Bricout	PS	Jean-Louis Bricout	PS
Aisne	4th	Marie-Françoise Bechtel	RM	Marc Delatte	LREM
Aisne	5th	Jacques Krabal	PRG	Jacques Krabal	LREM
Allier	1st	Guy Chambefort*	PS	Jean-Paul Dufrègne	PCF
Allier	2nd	Bernard Lesterlin*	DVG	Laurence Vanceunebrock-Mialon	LREM
Allier	3rd	Gérard Charasse*	PRG	Bénédicte Peyrol	LREM
Alpes-de-Haute-Provence	1st	Gilbert Sauvan*	PS	Delphine Bagarry	LREM
Alpes-de-Haute-Provence	2nd	Christophe Castaner	PS	Christophe Castaner	LREM
Hautes-Alpes	1st	Karine Berger	PS	Pascale Boyer	LREM
Hautes-Alpes	2nd	Joël Giraud	PRG	Joël Giraud	LREM
Alpes-Maritimes	1st	Éric Ciotti	LR	Éric Ciotti	LR
Alpes-Maritimes	2nd	Charles-Ange Ginésy*	LR	Loïc Dombreval	LREM
Alpes-Maritimes	3rd	Rudy Salles	UDI	Cédric Roussel	LREM
Alpes-Maritimes	4th	Jean-Claude Guibal*	LR	Alexandra Valetta-Ardisson	LREM
Alpes-Maritimes	5th	Marine Brenier	LR	Marine Brenier	LR
Alpes-Maritimes	6th	Lionnel Luca*	LR	Laurence Trastour-Isnart	LR
Alpes-Maritimes	7th	Jean Leonetti*	LR	Éric Pauget	LR
Alpes-Maritimes	8th	Bernard Brochand	LR	Bernard Brochand	LR
Alpes-Maritimes	9th	Michèle Tabarot	LR	Michèle Tabarot	LR
Ardèche	1st	vacant		Hervé Saulignac	PS
Ardèche	2nd	Olivier Dussopt	PS	Olivier Dussopt	PS
Ardèche	3rd	Sabine Buis	PS	Fabrice Brun	LR
Ardennes	1st	Bérengère Poletti	LR	Bérengère Poletti	LR
Ardennes	2nd	Christophe Léonard	PS	Pierre Cordier	LR
Ardennes	3rd	Jean-Luc Warsmann	LR	Jean-Luc Warsmann	LR
Ariège	1st	Frédérique Massat*	PS	Bénédicte Taurine	FI
Ariège	2nd	Alain Fauré	PS	Michel Larive	FI
Aube	1st	Nicolas Dhuicq	LR	Grégory Besson-Moreau	LREM
Aube	2nd	Jean-Claude Mathis*	LR	Valérie Bazin-Malgras	LR
Aube	3rd	Gérard Menuel	LR	Gérard Menuel	LR
Aude	1st	Jean-Claude Perez	DVG	Danièle Hérin	LREM
Aude	2nd	Marie-Hélène Fabre	PS	Alain Péréa	LREM
Aude	3rd	Jean-Paul Dupré*	PS	Mireille Robert	LREM
Aveyron	1st	Yves Censi	LR	Stéphane Mazars	LREM
Aveyron	2nd	Marie-Lou Marcel*	PS	Anne Blanc	LREM
Aveyron	3rd	Arnaud Viala	LR	Arnaud Viala	LR
Bouches-du-Rhône	1st	Valérie Boyer	LR	Valérie Boyer	LR
Bouches-du-Rhône	2nd	Dominique Tian	LR	Claire Pitollat	LREM
Bouches-du-Rhône	3rd	vacant		Alexandra Louis	LREM
Bouches-du-Rhône	4th	Patrick Mennucci	PS	Jean-Luc Mélenchon	FI
Bouches-du-Rhône	5th	Marie-Arlette Carlotti*	PS	Cathy Racon-Bouzon	LREM
Bouches-du-Rhône	6th	Guy Teissier	LR	Guy Teissier	LR
Bouches-du-Rhône	7th	Henri Jibrayel	PS	Saïd Ahamada	LREM
Bouches-du-Rhône	8th	Jean-Pierre Maggi*	PRG	Jean-Marc Zulesi	LREM
Bouches-du-Rhône	9th	Bernard Deflesselles	LR	Bernard Deflesselles	LR
Bouches-du-Rhône	10th	François-Michel Lambert	UDE	François-Michel Lambert	LREM
Bouches-du-Rhône	11th	Christian Kert	LR	Mohamed Laqhila	MoDem
Bouches-du-Rhône	12th	Vincent Burroni*	PS	Éric Diard	LR
Bouches-du-Rhône	13th	Gaby Charroux*	PCF	Pierre Dharréville	PCF
Bouches-du-Rhône	14th	Jean-David Ciot	PS	Anne-Laurence Petel	LREM
Bouches-du-Rhône	15th	Bernard Reynès	LR	Bernard Reynès	LR
Bouches-du-Rhône	16th	Michel Vauzelle*	PS	Monica Michel	LREM
Calvados	1st	Philippe Duron*	PS	Fabrice Le Vigoureux	LREM
Calvados	2nd	Laurence Dumont	PS	Laurence Dumont	PS
Calvados	3rd	Guy Bailliart**	PS	Sébastien Leclerc	LR
Calvados	4th	Nicole Ameline	LR	Christophe Blanchet	LREM
Calvados	5th	Isabelle Attard	DVG	Bertrand Bouyx	LREM
Calvados	6th	Alain Tourret	PRG	Alain Tourret	LREM
Cantal	1st	Alain Calmette*	PS	Vincent Descœur	LR
Cantal	2nd	Alain Marleix*	LR	Jean-Yves Bony	LR
Charente	1st	David Comet**	PS	Thomas Mesnier	LREM
Charente	2nd	Marie-Line Reynaud*	PS	Sandra Marsaud	LREM
Charente	3rd	Jérôme Lambert	PS	Jérôme Lambert	PS
Charente-Maritime	1st	Olivier Falorni	DVG	Olivier Falorni	DVG
Charente-Maritime	2nd	Suzanne Tallard*	PS	Frédérique Tuffnell	LREM
Charente-Maritime	3rd	Catherine Quéré*	PS	Jean-Philippe Ardouin	LREM
Charente-Maritime	4th	Dominique Bussereau*	LR	Raphaël Gérard	LREM
Charente-Maritime	5th	Didier Quentin	LR	Didier Quentin	LR
Cher	1st	Yves Fromion*	LR	François Cormier-Bouligeon	LREM
Cher	2nd	Nicolas Sansu	PCF	Nadia Essayan	MoDem
Cher	3rd	Yann Galut	PS	Loïc Kervran	LREM
Corrèze	1st	Alain Ballay*	PS	Christophe Jerretie	LREM
Corrèze	2nd	Philippe Nauche	PS	Frédérique Meunier	LR
Corse-du-Sud	1st	Laurent Marcangeli*	LR	Jean-Jacques Ferrara	LR
Corse-du-Sud	2nd	Camille de Rocca Serra	LR	Paul-André Colombani	PC
Haute-Corse	1st	Sauveur Gandolfi-Scheit	LR	Michel Castellani	PC
Haute-Corse	2nd	Paul Giacobbi*	DVG	Jean-Félix Acquaviva	PC
Côte-d'Or	1st	Laurent Grandguillaume*	PS	Didier Martin	LREM
Côte-d'Or	2nd	Rémi Delatte	LR	Rémi Delatte	LR
Côte-d'Or	3rd	Kheira Bouziane-Laroussi***	PS	Fadila Khattabi	LREM
Côte-d'Or	4th	vacant		Yolaine de Courson	LREM
Côte-d'Or	5th	Alain Suguenot*	LR	Didier Paris	LREM
Côtes-d'Armor	1st	Michel Lesage	PS	Bruno Joncour	MoDem
Côtes-d'Armor	2nd	Viviane Le Dissez	PS	Hervé Berville	LREM
Côtes-d'Armor	3rd	Marc Le Fur	LR	Marc Le Fur	LR
Côtes-d'Armor	4th	Annie Le Houérou	PS	Yannick Kerlogot	LREM
Côtes-d'Armor	5th	Éric Bothorel*	PS	Éric Bothorel	LREM
Creuse	1st	Michel Vergnier	PS	Jean-Baptiste Moreau	LREM
Dordogne	1st	Pascal Deguilhem*	PS	Philippe Chassaing	LREM
Dordogne	2nd	Brigitte Allain	EELV	Michel Delpon	LREM
Dordogne	3rd	Colette Langlade	PS	Jean-Pierre Cubertafon	MoDem
Dordogne	4th	Germinal Peiro*	PS	Jacqueline Dubois	LREM
Doubs	1st	Barbara Romagnan	PS	Fannette Charvier	LREM
Doubs	2nd	Éric Alauzet	EELV	Éric Alauzet	EELV
Doubs	3rd	Marcel Bonnot*	LR	Denis Sommer	LREM
Doubs	4th	Frédéric Barbier	PS	Frédéric Barbier	LREM
Doubs	5th	Annie Genevard	LR	Annie Genevard	LR
Drôme	1st	Patrick Labaune*	LR	Mireille Clapot	LREM
Drôme	2nd	Franck Reynier	UDI	Alice Thourot	LREM
Drôme	3rd	Hervé Mariton*	LR	Célia de Lavergne	LREM
Drôme	4th	Nathalie Nieson*	PS	Emmanuelle Anthoine	LR
Eure	1st	Bruno Le Maire	LR	Bruno Le Maire	LREM
Eure	2nd	Jean-Louis Destans*	PS	Fabien Gouttefarde	LREM
Eure	3rd	vacant		Marie Tamarelle-Verhaeghe	MoDem
Eure	4th	François Loncle*	PS	Bruno Questel	LREM
Eure	5th	Franck Gilard*	LR	Claire O'Petit	LREM
Eure-et-Loir	1st	Jean-Pierre Gorges*	LR	Guillaume Kasbarian	LREM
Eure-et-Loir	2nd	Olivier Marleix	LR	Olivier Marleix	LR
Eure-et-Loir	3rd	Laure de La Raudière	LR	Laure de La Raudière	LR
Eure-et-Loir	4th	Philippe Vigier	UDI	Philippe Vigier	UDI
Finistère	1st	Marie-Thérèse Le Roy**	PS	Annaïg Le Meur	LREM
Finistère	2nd	Patricia Adam	PS	Jean-Charles Larsonneur	LREM
Finistère	3rd	Jean-Luc Bleunven	DVG	Didier Le Gac	LREM
Finistère	4th	Marylise Lebranchu*	PS	Sandrine Le Feur	LREM
Finistère	5th	Chantal Guittet	PS	Graziella Melchior	LREM
Finistère	6th	Richard Ferrand	PS	Richard Ferrand	LREM
Finistère	7th	Annick Le Loch*	PS	Liliane Tanguy	LREM
Finistère	8th	Gilbert Le Bris*	PS	Erwan Balanant	LREM
Gard	1st	Françoise Dumas	PS	Françoise Dumas	LREM
Gard	2nd	Gilbert Collard	RBM	Gilbert Collard	FN
Gard	3rd	Patrice Prat*	DVG	Anthony Cellier	LREM
Gard	4th	Fabrice Verdier	PS	Annie Chapelier	LREM
Gard	5th	William Dumas*	PS	Olivier Gaillard	LREM
Gard	6th	Christophe Cavard	PE	Philippe Berta	LREM
Haute-Garonne	1st	Catherine Lemorton	PS	Pierre Cabaré	LREM
Haute-Garonne	2nd	Gérard Bapt	PS	Jean-Luc Lagleize	MoDem
Haute-Garonne	3rd	Laurence Arribagé	LR	Corinne Vignon	LREM
Haute-Garonne	4th	Martine Martinel	PS	Mickaël Nogal	LREM
Haute-Garonne	5th	Françoise Imbert*	PS	Jean-François Portarrieu	LREM
Haute-Garonne	6th	Monique Iborra	PS	Monique Iborra	LREM
Haute-Garonne	7th	Patrick Lemasle*	PS	Élisabeth Toutut-Picard	LREM
Haute-Garonne	8th	Carole Delga*	PS	Joël Aviragnet	PS
Haute-Garonne	9th	Christophe Borgel	PS	Sandrine Mörch	LREM
Haute-Garonne	10th	Kader Arif	PS	Sébastien Nadot	LREM
Gers	1st	Philippe Martin*	PS	Jean-René Cazeneuve	LREM
Gers	2nd	Gisèle Biémouret	PS	Gisèle Biémouret	PS
Gironde	1st	Sandrine Doucet*	PS	Dominique David	LREM
Gironde	2nd	Michèle Delaunay	PS	Catherine Fabre	LREM
Gironde	3rd	Noël Mamère*	DVE	Loïc Prud'homme	FI
Gironde	4th	Conchita Lacuey*	PS	Alain David	PS
Gironde	5th	Pascale Got	PS	Benoît Simian	LREM
Gironde	6th	Marie Récalde	PS	Eric Poulliant	LREM
Gironde	7th	Alain Rousset*	PS	Bérangère Couillard	LREM
Gironde	8th	Yves Foulon	LR	Sophie Panonacle	LREM
Gironde	9th	Gilles Savary	PS	Sophie Mette	MoDem
Gironde	10th	Florent Boudié	PS	Florent Boudié	LREM
Gironde	11th	Philippe Plisson*	PS	Véronique Hammerer	LREM
Gironde	12th	Martine Faure*	PS	Christelle Dubos	LREM
Hérault	1st	Jean-Louis Roumégas	EELV	Patricia Mirallès	LREM
Hérault	2nd	Anne-Yvonne Le Dain***	PS	Muriel Ressiguier	FI
Hérault	3rd	Fanny Dombre-Coste	PS	Coralie Dubost	LREM
Hérault	4th	Frédéric Roig	PS	Jean-François Eliaou	LREM
Hérault	5th	Kléber Mesquida*	PS	Philippe Huppé	LREM
Hérault	6th	Élie Aboud	LR	Emmanuelle Ménard	FN
Hérault	7th	Sébastien Denaja	PS	Christophe Euzet	LREM
Hérault	8th	Christian Assaf	PS	Nicolas Démoulin	LREM
Hérault	9th	Patrick Vignal	PS	Patrick Vignal	LREM
Ille-et-Vilaine	1st	Marie-Anne Chapdelaine	PS	Mostapha Laabid	LREM
Ille-et-Vilaine	2nd	Nathalie Appéré*	PS	Laurence Maillart-Méhaignerie	MoDem
Ille-et-Vilaine	3rd	François André	PS	François André	PS
Ille-et-Vilaine	4th	Jean-René Marsac*	PS	Gaël Le Bohec	LREM
Ille-et-Vilaine	5th	Isabelle Le Callennec	LR	Christine Cloarec	LREM
Ille-et-Vilaine	6th	Thierry Benoit	UDI	Thierry Benoit	UDI
Ille-et-Vilaine	7th	Gilles Lurton	LR	Gilles Lurton	LR
Ille-et-Vilaine	8th	Marcel Rogemont*	PS	Florian Bachelier	LREM
Indre	1st	Jean-Paul Chanteguet	PS	François Jolivet	LREM
Indre	2nd	Isabelle Bruneau	PS	Nicolas Forissier	LR
Indre-et-Loire	1st	Jean-Patrick Gille	PS	Philippe Chalumeau	LREM
Indre-et-Loire	2nd	Claude Greff	LR	Daniel Labaronne	LREM
Indre-et-Loire	3rd	Jean-Marie Beffara**	PS	Sophie Auconie	UDI
Indre-et-Loire	4th	Laurent Baumel	PS	Fabienne Colboc	LREM
Indre-et-Loire	5th	Philippe Briand*	LR	Sabine Thillaye	LREM
Isère	1st	Geneviève Fioraso*	PS	Olivier Véran	LREM
Isère	2nd	Michel Issindou*	PS	Jean-Charles Colas-Roy	LREM
Isère	3rd	Michel Destot	PS	Émilie Chalas	LREM
Isère	4th	Marie-Noëlle Battistel	PS	Marie-Noëlle Battistel	PS
Isère	5th	Pierre Ribeaud*	PS	Catherine Kamowski	LREM
Isère	6th	Alain Moyne-Bressand	LR	Cendra Motin	LREM
Isère	7th	Jean-Pierre Barbier*	LR	Monique Limon	LREM
Isère	8th	Erwann Binet	PS	Caroline Abadie	LREM
Isère	9th	Michèle Bonneton*	EELV	Élodie Jacquier-Laforge	MoDem
Isère	10th	Joëlle Huillier	PS	Marjolaine Meynier-Millefert	LREM
Jura	1st	Jacques Pélissard*	LR	Danielle Brulebois	LREM
Jura	2nd	Marie-Christine Dalloz	LR	Marie-Christine Dalloz	LR
Jura	3rd	Jean-Marie Sermier	LR	Jean-Marie Sermier	LR
Landes	1st	Florence Delaunay*	PS	Geneviève Darrieussecq	MoDem
Landes	2nd	Jean-Pierre Dufau*	PS	Lionel Causse	LREM
Landes	3rd	vacant		Boris Vallaud	PS
Loir-et-Cher	1st	Denys Robiliard	PS	Marc Fesneau	MoDem
Loir-et-Cher	2nd	Patrice Martin-Lalande*	LR	Guillaume Peltier	LR
Loir-et-Cher	3rd	Maurice Leroy	UDI	Maurice Leroy	UDI
Loire	1st	Régis Juanico	PS	Régis Juanico	PS
Loire	2nd	Jean-Louis Gagnaire*	PS	Jean-Michel Mis	LREM
Loire	3rd	François Rochebloine	UDI	Valéria Faure-Muntian	LREM
Loire	4th	Dino Cinieri	LR	Dino Cinieri	LR
Loire	5th	Yves Nicolin*	LR	Nathalie Sarles	MoDem
Loire	6th	Paul Salen	LR	Julien Borowczyk	LREM
Haute-Loire	1st	Laurent Wauquiez*	LR	Isabelle Valentin	LR
Haute-Loire	2nd	Jean-Pierre Vigier	LR	Jean-Pierre Vigier	LR
Loire-Atlantique	1st	François de Rugy	PE	François de Rugy	LREM
Loire-Atlantique	2nd	Marie-Françoise Clergeau*	PS	Valérie Oppelt	LREM
Loire-Atlantique	3rd	Karine Daniel	PS	Anne-France Brunet	LREM
Loire-Atlantique	4th	Dominique Raimbourg	PS	Aude Amadou	LREM
Loire-Atlantique	5th	Michel Ménard	PS	Sarah El Haïry	MoDem
Loire-Atlantique	6th	Yves Daniel	PS	Yves Daniel	LREM
Loire-Atlantique	7th	Christophe Priou*	LR	Sandrine Josso	LREM
Loire-Atlantique	8th	Marie-Odile Bouillé*	PS	Audrey Dufeu-Schubert	LREM
Loire-Atlantique	9th	Monique Rabin	PS	Yannick Haury	MoDem
Loire-Atlantique	10th	Sophie Errante	PS	Sophie Errante	LREM
Loiret	1st	Olivier Carré*	LR	Stéphanie Rist	LREM
Loiret	2nd	Serge Grouard	LR	Caroline Janvier	LREM
Loiret	3rd	Claude de Ganay	LR	Claude de Ganay	LR
Loiret	4th	Jean-Pierre Door	LR	Jean-Pierre Door	LR
Loiret	5th	Marianne Dubois	LR	Marianne Dubois	LR
Loiret	6th	Valérie Corre	PS	Richard Ramos	MoDem
Lot	1st	Dominique Orliac	PRG	Aurélien Pradié	LR
Lot	2nd	Jean Launay*	PS	Huguette Tiegna	LREM
Lot-et-Garonne	1st	Lucette Lousteau	PS	Michel Lauzzana	LREM
Lot-et-Garonne	2nd	Régine Povéda**	PS	Alexandre Freschi	LREM
Lot-et-Garonne	3rd	Jean-Louis Costes	LR	Olivier Damaisin	LREM
Lozère	1st	Pierre Morel-À-L'Huissier	LR	Pierre Morel-À-L'Huissier	LR
Maine-et-Loire	1st	Luc Belot	PS	Matthieu Orphelin	LREM
Maine-et-Loire	2nd	Marc Goua*	PS	Stella Dupont	LREM
Maine-et-Loire	3rd	Jean-Charles Taugourdeau	LR	Jean-Charles Taugourdeau	LR
Maine-et-Loire	4th	Michel Piron*	UDI	Laetitia Saint-Paul	LREM
Maine-et-Loire	5th	Gilles Bourdouleix*	CNIP	Denis Masséglia	LREM
Maine-et-Loire	6th	Serge Bardy	PS	Nicole Dubré-Chirat	LREM
Maine-et-Loire	7th	Marc Laffineur*	LR	Philippe Bolo	MoDem
Manche	1st	Philippe Gosselin	LR	Philippe Gosselin	LR
Manche	2nd	Guénhaël Huet	LR	Bertrand Sorre	LREM
Manche	3rd	Stéphane Travert	PS	Stéphane Travert	LREM
Manche	4th	Geneviève Gosselin-Fleury*	PS	Sonia Krimi	DIV
Marne	1st	Arnaud Robinet*	LR	Valérie Beauvais	LR
Marne	2nd	Catherine Vautrin	LR	Aina Kuric	LREM
Marne	3rd	Philippe Martin*	LR	Éric Girardin	LREM
Marne	4th	Benoist Apparu*	LR	Lise Magnier	LR
Marne	5th	Charles de Courson	UDI	Charles de Courson	UDI
Haute-Marne	1st	Luc Chatel*	LR	Bérangère Abba	LREM
Haute-Marne	2nd	François Cornut-Gentille	LR	François Cornut-Gentille	LR
Mayenne	1st	Guillaume Garot	PS	Guillaume Garot	PS
Mayenne	2nd	Guillaume Chevrollier	LR	Géraldine Bannier	MoDem
Mayenne	3rd	Yannick Favennec	UDI	Yannick Favennec	UDI
Meurthe-et-Moselle	1st	Chaynesse Khirouni	PS	Carole Grandjean	LREM
Meurthe-et-Moselle	2nd	Hervé Féron	PS	Laurent Garcia	MoDem
Meurthe-et-Moselle	3rd	Jean-Marc Fournel**	PS	Xavier Paluszkiewicz	LREM
Meurthe-et-Moselle	4th	Jacques Lamblin*	LR	Thibault Bazin	LR
Meurthe-et-Moselle	5th	Dominique Potier	PS	Dominique Potier	PS
Meurthe-et-Moselle	6th	Jean-Yves Le Déaut*	PS	Caroline Fiat	FI
Meuse	1st	Bertrand Pancher	UDI	Bertrand Pancher	UDI
Meuse	2nd	Jean-Louis Dumont	PS	Émilie Cariou	LREM
Morbihan	1st	Hervé Pellois	DVG	Hervé Pellois	LREM
Morbihan	2nd	Philippe Le Ray	LR	Jimmy Pahun	DIV
Morbihan	3rd	Jean-Pierre Le Roch*	PS	Nicole Le Peih	LREM
Morbihan	4th	Paul Molac	DVG	Paul Molac	LREM
Morbihan	5th	Gwendal Rouillard	PS	Gwendal Rouillard	LREM
Morbihan	6th	Philippe Noguès	DVG	Jean-Michel Jacques	LREM
Moselle	1st	Aurélie Filippetti	PS	Belkhir Belhaddad	LREM
Moselle	2nd	Denis Jacquat*	LR	Ludovic Mendes	LREM
Moselle	3rd	Marie-Jo Zimmermann	LR	Richard Lioger	LREM
Moselle	4th	Alain Marty*	LR	Fabien Di Filippo	LR
Moselle	5th	Céleste Lett	LR	Nicole Gries-Trisse	LREM
Moselle	6th	Laurent Kalinowski*	PS	Christophe Arend	LREM
Moselle	7th	Paola Zanetti	PS	Hélène Zannier	LREM
Moselle	8th	Michel Liebgott*	PS	Brahim Hammouche	MoDem
Moselle	9th	Patrick Weiten*	UDI	Isabelle Rauch	LREM
Nièvre	1st	Martine Carrillon-Couvreur*	PS	Perrine Goulet	LREM
Nièvre	2nd	Christian Paul	PS	Patrice Perrot	LREM
Nord	1st	vacant		Adrien Quatennens	FI
Nord	2nd	Audrey Linkenheld	PS	Ugo Bernalicis	FI
Nord	3rd	Rémi Pauvros	PS	Christophe Di Pompeo	LREM
Nord	4th	Marc-Philippe Daubresse*	LR	Brigitte Liso	LREM
Nord	5th	Sébastien Huyghe	LR	Sébastien Huyghe	LR
Nord	6th	Thierry Lazaro	LR	Charlotte Lecocq	LREM
Nord	7th	Francis Vercamer	UDI	Francis Vercamer	UDI
Nord	8th	Dominique Baert*	PS	Catherine Osson	LREM
Nord	9th	Bernard Gérard	LR	Valérie Petit	LREM
Nord	10th	Vincent Ledoux	LR	Vincent Ledoux	LR
Nord	11th	Yves Durand*	PS	Laurent Pietraszewski	LREM
Nord	12th	Christian Bataille	PS	Anne-Laure Cattelot	LREM
Nord	13th	Christian Hutin*	MRC	Christian Hutin	MRC
Nord	14th	Jean-Pierre Decool*	LR	Paul Christophe	LR
Nord	15th	Jean-Pierre Allossery*	PS	Jennifer de Temmerman	LREM
Nord	16th	Jean-Jacques Candelier*	PCF	Alain Bruneel	PCF
Nord	17th	Marc Dolez*	FG	Dimitri Houbron	LREM
Nord	18th	François-Xavier Villain*	UDI	Guy Bricout	UDI
Nord	19th	Anne-Lise Dufour-Tonini	PS	Sébastien Chenu	FN
Nord	20th	Alain Bocquet*	PCF	Fabien Roussel	PCF
Nord	21st	Laurent Degallaix*	UDI	Béatrice Descamps	UDI
Oise	1st	Olivier Dassault	LR	Olivier Dassault	LR
Oise	2nd	Jean-François Mancel*	LR	Agnès Thill	LREM
Oise	3rd	Michel Françaix	PS	Pascal Bois	LREM
Oise	4th	Éric Woerth	LR	Éric Woerth	LR
Oise	5th	Lucien Degauchy*	LR	Pierre Vatin	LR
Oise	6th	Patrice Carvalho	PCF	Carole Bureau-Bonnard	LREM
Oise	7th	Édouard Courtial*	LR	Maxime Minot	LR
Orne	1st	Joaquim Pueyo	PS	Joaquim Pueyo	PS
Orne	2nd	Véronique Louwagie	LR	Véronique Louwagie	LR
Orne	3rd	Yves Goasdoué*	DVG	Jérôme Nury	LR
Pas-de-Calais	1st	Jean-Jacques Cottel	PS	Bruno Duvergé	MoDem
Pas-de-Calais	2nd	Jacqueline Maquet	PS	Jacqueline Maquet	LREM
Pas-de-Calais	3rd	Guy Delcourt*	PS	José Évrard	FN
Pas-de-Calais	4th	Daniel Fasquelle	LR	Daniel Fasquelle	LR
Pas-de-Calais	5th	Frédéric Cuvillier*	PS	Jean-Pierre Pont	LREM
Pas-de-Calais	6th	Brigitte Bourguignon	PS	Brigitte Bourguignon	LREM
Pas-de-Calais	7th	Yann Capet	PS	Pierre-Henri Dumont	LR
Pas-de-Calais	8th	Michel Lefait*	PS	Benoît Potterie	LREM
Pas-de-Calais	9th	Stéphane Saint-André	PRG	Marguerite Deprez-Audebert	MoDem
Pas-de-Calais	10th	Serge Janquin*	PS	Ludovic Pajot	FN
Pas-de-Calais	11th	Philippe Kemel	PS	Marine Le Pen	FN
Pas-de-Calais	12th	Nicolas Bays*	PS	Bruno Bilde	FN
Puy-de-Dôme	1st	Odile Saugues*	PS	Valérie Thomas	LREM
Puy-de-Dôme	2nd	Christine Pirès-Beaune	PS	Christine Pirès-Beaune	PS
Puy-de-Dôme	3rd	Danielle Auroi*	EELV	Laurence Vichnievsky	MoDem
Puy-de-Dôme	4th	Jean-Paul Bacquet*	PS	Michel Fanget	MoDem
Puy-de-Dôme	5th	André Chassaigne	PCF	André Chassaigne	PCF
Pyrénées-Atlantiques	1st	Martine Lignières-Cassou*	PS	Josy Poueyto	MoDem
Pyrénées-Atlantiques	2nd	Nathalie Chabanne	PS	Jean-Paul Mattei	MoDem
Pyrénées-Atlantiques	3rd	David Habib	PS	David Habib	PS
Pyrénées-Atlantiques	4th	Jean Lassalle	R	Jean Lassalle	R
Pyrénées-Atlantiques	5th	Colette Capdevielle	PS	Florence Lasserre-David	MoDem
Pyrénées-Atlantiques	6th	Sylviane Alaux	PS	Vincent Bru	MoDem
Hautes-Pyrénées	1st	Jean Glavany	PS	Jean-Bernard Sempastous	LREM
Hautes-Pyrénées	2nd	Jeanine Dubié	PRG	Jeanine Dubié	PRG
Pyrénées-Orientales	1st	Jacques Cresta*	PS	Romain Grau	LREM
Pyrénées-Orientales	2nd	Fernand Siré	LR	Louis Aliot	FN
Pyrénées-Orientales	3rd	Robert Olive**	PS	Laurence Gayte	LREM
Pyrénées-Orientales	4th	Pierre Aylagas*	PS	Sébastien Cazenove	LREM
Bas-Rhin	1st	Éric Elkouby	PS	Thierry Michels	LREM
Bas-Rhin	2nd	Philippe Bies	PS	Sylvain Waserman	LREM
Bas-Rhin	3rd	André Schneider*	LR	Bruno Studer	LREM
Bas-Rhin	4th	Sophie Rohfritsch	LR	Martine Wonner	LREM
Bas-Rhin	5th	Antoine Herth	LR	Antoine Herth	LR
Bas-Rhin	6th	Laurent Furst	LR	Laurent Furst	LR
Bas-Rhin	7th	Patrick Hetzel	LR	Patrick Hetzel	LR
Bas-Rhin	8th	Frédéric Reiss	LR	Frédéric Reiss	LR
Bas-Rhin	9th	Claude Sturni*	DVD	Vincent Thiébaut	LREM
Haut-Rhin	1st	Éric Straumann	LR	Éric Straumann	LR
Haut-Rhin	2nd	Jean-Louis Christ*	LR	Jacques Cattin	LR
Haut-Rhin	3rd	Jean-Luc Reitzer	LR	Jean-Luc Reitzer	LR
Haut-Rhin	4th	Michel Sordi*	LR	Raphaël Schellenberger	LR
Haut-Rhin	5th	Arlette Grosskost*	LR	Olivier Becht	DVD
Haut-Rhin	6th	Francis Hillmeyer	UDI	Bruno Fuchs	LREM
Rhône	1st	Gilda Hobert*	PRG	Thomas Rudigoz	LREM
Rhône	2nd	Pierre-Alain Muet*	PS	Hubert Julien-Laferrière	LREM
Rhône	3rd	Jean-Louis Touraine	PS	Jean-Louis Touraine	LREM
Rhône	4th	Dominique Nachury	LR	Anne Brugnera	LREM
Rhône	5th	Philippe Cochet	LR	Blandine Brocard	LREM
Rhône	6th	Pascale Crozon*	PS	Bruno Bonnell	LREM
Rhône	7th	Renaud Gauquelin	PS	Anissa Khedher	LREM
Rhône	8th	Patrice Verchère	LR	Patrice Verchère	LR
Rhône	9th	Bernard Perrut	LR	Bernard Perrut	LR
Rhône	10th	Christophe Guilloteau*	LR	Thomas Gassilloud	LREM
Rhône	11th	Georges Fenech	LR	Jean-Luc Fugit	LREM
Rhône	12th	Michel Terrot*	LR	Cyrille Isaac-Sibille	MoDem
Rhône	13th	Philippe Meunier	LR	Danièle Cazarian	LREM
Rhône	14th	Yves Blein	PS	Yves Blein	LREM
Haute-Saône	1st	Alain Chrétien*	LR	Barbara Bessot Ballot	LREM
Haute-Saône	2nd	Jean-Michel Villaumé*	PS	Christophe Lejeune	LREM
Saône-et-Loire	1st	Thomas Thévenoud*	DVG	Benjamin Dirx	LREM
Saône-et-Loire	2nd	Édith Gueugneau*	DVG	Josiane Corneloup	LR
Saône-et-Loire	3rd	Philippe Baumel	PS	Rémy Rebeyrotte	LREM
Saône-et-Loire	4th	Cécile Untermaier	PS	Cécile Untermaier	PS
Saône-et-Loire	5th	vacant		Raphaël Gauvain	LREM
Sarthe	1st	Françoise Dubois	PS	Damien Pichereau	LREM
Sarthe	2nd	Marietta Karamanli	PS	Marietta Karamanli	PS
Sarthe	3rd	Guy-Michel Chauveau*	DVG	Pascale Fontenel-Personne	LREM
Sarthe	4th	Sylvie Tolmont**	PS	Stéphane Le Foll	PS
Sarthe	5th	Dominique Le Mèner*	LR	Jean-Carles Grelier	LR
Savoie	1st	Dominique Dord	LR	Typhanie Degois	LREM
Savoie	2nd	Hervé Gaymard*	LR	Vincent Rolland	LR
Savoie	3rd	Béatrice Santais*	PS	Émilie Bonnivard	LR
Savoie	4th	Bernadette Laclais	PS	Patrick Mignola	MoDem
Haute-Savoie	1st	Bernard Accoyer*	LR	Véronique Riotton	LREM
Haute-Savoie	2nd	Lionel Tardy	LR	Frédérique Lardet	LREM
Haute-Savoie	3rd	Martial Saddier	LR	Martial Saddier	LR
Haute-Savoie	4th	Virginie Duby-Muller	LR	Virginie Duby-Muller	LR
Haute-Savoie	5th	Marc Francina*	LR	Marion Lenne	LREM
Haute-Savoie	6th	Sophie Dion	LR	Xavier Roseren	LREM
Paris	1st	Pierre Lellouche*	LR	Sylvain Maillard	LREM
Paris	2nd	François Fillon*	LR	Gilles Le Gendre	LREM
Paris	3rd	Annick Lepetit	PS	Stanislas Guerini	LREM
Paris	4th	Bernard Debré*	LR	Brigitte Kuster	LR
Paris	5th	Seybah Dagoma	PS	Benjamin Griveaux	LREM
Paris	6th	Cécile Duflot	EELV	Pierre Person	LREM
Paris	7th	Patrick Bloche	PS	Pacôme Rupin	LREM
Paris	8th	Sandrine Mazetier	PS	Laetitia Avia	LREM
Paris	9th	Anne-Christine Lang*	PS	Buon Tan	LREM
Paris	10th	Denis Baupin*	DVG	Anne-Christine Lang	LREM
Paris	11th	Pascal Cherki	PS	Marielle de Sarnez	MoDem
Paris	12th	Philippe Goujon	LR	Olivia Grégoire	LREM
Paris	13th	Jean-François Lamour	LR	Hugues Renson	LREM
Paris	14th	Claude Goasguen	LR	Claude Goasguen	LR
Paris	15th	George Pau-Langevin	PS	George Pau-Langevin	PS
Paris	16th	Jean-Christophe Cambadélis	PS	Mounir Mahjoubi	LREM
Paris	17th	Daniel Vaillant*	PS	Danièle Obono	FI
Paris	18th	vacant		Pierre-Yves Bournazel	LR
Seine-Maritime	1st	Valérie Fourneyron	PS	Damien Adam	LREM
Seine-Maritime	2nd	Françoise Guégot	LR	Annie Vidal	LREM
Seine-Maritime	3rd	Luce Pane	PS	Hubert Wulfranc	PCF
Seine-Maritime	4th	Guillaume Bachelay	PS	Sira Sylla	LREM
Seine-Maritime	5th	Christophe Bouillon	PS	Christophe Bouillon	PS
Seine-Maritime	6th	Marie Le Vern	PS	Sébastien Jumel	PCF
Seine-Maritime	7th	Édouard Philippe*	LR	Agnès Firmin Le Bodo	LR
Seine-Maritime	8th	Catherine Troallic	PS	Jean-Paul Lecoq	PCF
Seine-Maritime	9th	Jacques Dellerie**	PS	Stéphanie Kerbarh	LREM
Seine-Maritime	10th	Dominique Chauvel	DVG	Xavier Batut	LREM
Seine-et-Marne	1st	Jean-Claude Mignon*	LR	Aude Luquet	MoDem
Seine-et-Marne	2nd	Valérie Lacroute	LR	Valérie Lacroute	LR
Seine-et-Marne	3rd	Yves Jégo	UDI	Yves Jégo	UDI
Seine-et-Marne	4th	Christian Jacob	LR	Christian Jacob	LR
Seine-et-Marne	5th	Franck Riester	LR	Franck Riester	LR
Seine-et-Marne	6th	Jean-François Copé*	LR	Jean-François Parigi	LR
Seine-et-Marne	7th	Yves Albarello	LR	Rodrigue Kokouendo	LREM
Seine-et-Marne	8th	Eduardo Rihan Cypel	PS	Jean-Michel Fauvergue	LREM
Seine-et-Marne	9th	Guy Geoffroy	LR	Michèle Peyron	LREM
Seine-et-Marne	10th	Émeric Bréhier*	PS	Stéphanie Do	LREM
Seine-et-Marne	11th	Olivier Faure	PS	Olivier Faure	PS
Yvelines	1st	François de Mazières*	DVD	Didier Baichère	LREM
Yvelines	2nd	Pascal Thévenot	LR	Jean-Noël Barrot	LREM
Yvelines	3rd	Henri Guaino*	LR	Béatrice Piron	LREM
Yvelines	4th	Pierre Lequiller*	LR	Marie Lebec	LREM
Yvelines	5th	Jacques Myard	LR	Yaël Braun-Pivet	LREM
Yvelines	6th	Pierre Morange	LR	Natalia Pouzyreff	LREM
Yvelines	7th	Arnaud Richard	UDI	Michèle de Vaucouleurs	MoDem
Yvelines	8th	Françoise Descamps-Crosnier	PS	Michel Vialay	LR
Yvelines	9th	Jean-Marie Tétart	LR	Bruno Millienne	MoDem
Yvelines	10th	Jean-Frédéric Poisson	PCD	Aurore Bergé	LREM
Yvelines	11th	Benoît Hamon	PS	Nadia Hai	LREM
Yvelines	12th	David Douillet	LR	Florence Granjus	LREM
Deux-Sèvres	1st	Geneviève Gaillard*	PS	Guillaume Chiche	LREM
Deux-Sèvres	2nd	Delphine Batho	PS	Delphine Batho	PS
Deux-Sèvres	3rd	Jean Grellier*	PS	Jean-Marie Fiévet	LREM
Somme	1st	Pascal Demarthe**	PS	François Ruffin	FI
Somme	2nd	Romain Joron**	PS	Barbara Pompili	LREM
Somme	3rd	Jean-Claude Buisine	PS	Emmanuel Maquet	LR
Somme	4th	Alain Gest*	LR	Jean-Claude Leclabart	LREM
Somme	5th	Stéphane Demilly	UDI	Stéphane Demilly	UDI
Tarn	1st	Philippe Folliot	AC	Philippe Folliot	AC
Tarn	2nd	Jacques Valax*	PS	Marie-Christine Verdier-Jouclas	LREM
Tarn	3rd	Linda Gourjade	PS	Jean Terlier	LREM
Tarn-et-Garonne	1st	Valérie Rabault	PS	Valérie Rabault	PS
Tarn-et-Garonne	2nd	Sylvia Pinel	PRG	Sylvia Pinel	PRG
Var	1st	Geneviève Levy	LR	Geneviève Levy	LR
Var	2nd	Philippe Vitel	LR	Cécile Muschotti	LREM
Var	3rd	Jean-Pierre Giran*	LR	Jean-Louis Masson	LR
Var	4th	Jean-Michel Couve*	LR	Sereine Mauborgne	LREM
Var	5th	Georges Ginesta*	LR	Philippe Michel-Kleisbauer	MoDem
Var	6th	Josette Pons*	LR	Valérie Gomez-Bassac	LREM
Var	7th	Jean-Sébastien Vialatte	LR	Émilie Guerel	LREM
Var	8th	Olivier Audibert-Troin	LR	Fabien Matras	LREM
Vaucluse	1st	Michèle Fournier-Armand*	PS	Jean-François Cesarini	LREM
Vaucluse	2nd	Jean-Claude Bouchet	LR	Jean-Claude Bouchet	LR
Vaucluse	3rd	Marion Maréchal-Le Pen*	FN	Brune Poirson	LREM
Vaucluse	4th	Jacques Bompard	LS	Jacques Bompard	LS
Vaucluse	5th	Julien Aubert	LR	Julien Aubert	LR
Vendée	1st	Alain Lebœuf	LR	Philippe Latombe	MoDem
Vendée	2nd	Sylviane Bulteau	PS	Patricia Gallerneau	MoDem
Vendée	3rd	Yannick Moreau*	LR	Stéphane Buchou	LREM
Vendée	4th	Véronique Besse*	MPF	Martine Leguille-Balloy	LREM
Vendée	5th	Hugues Fourage	PS	Pierre Henriet	LREM
Vienne	1st	Alain Claeys*	PS	Jacques Savatier	LREM
Vienne	2nd	Catherine Coutelle*	PS	Sacha Houlié	LREM
Vienne	3rd	Jean-Michel Clément	PS	Jean-Michel Clément	LREM
Vienne	4th	Véronique Massonneau	PE	Nicolas Turquois	MoDem
Haute-Vienne	1st	Alain Rodet*	PS	Sophie Beaudouin-Hubière	LREM
Haute-Vienne	2nd	Daniel Boisserie*	PS	Jean-Baptiste Djebbari-Bonnet	LREM
Haute-Vienne	3rd	Catherine Beaubatie	PS	Marie-Ange Magne	LREM
Vosges	1st	Michel Heinrich*	LR	Stéphane Viry	LR
Vosges	2nd	Gérard Cherpion	LR	Gérard Cherpion	LR
Vosges	3rd	François Vannson*	LR	Christophe Naegelen	DVD
Vosges	4th	Christian Franqueville	PS	Jean-Jacques Gaultier	LR
Yonne	1st	Guillaume Larrivé	LR	Guillaume Larrivé	LR
Yonne	2nd	Jean-Yves Caullet	PS	André Villiers	UDI
Yonne	3rd	Marie-Louise Fort*	LR	Michèle Crouzet	LREM
Territoire de Belfort	1st	Damien Meslot*	LR	Ian Boucard	LR
Territoire de Belfort	2nd	Michel Zumkeller	UDI	Michel Zumkeller	UDI
Essonne	1st	Manuel Valls	PS	Manuel Valls	DVG
Essonne	2nd	Franck Marlin	LR	Franck Marlin	LR
Essonne	3rd	Michel Pouzol	PS	Laëtitia Romeiro Dias	LREM
Essonne	4th	Nathalie Kosciusko-Morizet*	LR	Marie-Pierre Rixain	LREM
Essonne	5th	Maud Olivier	PS	Cédric Villani	LREM
Essonne	6th	François Lamy*	PS	Amélie de Montchalin	LREM
Essonne	7th	Éva Sas	EELV	Robin Reda	LR
Essonne	8th	Nicolas Dupont-Aignan	DLF	Nicolas Dupont-Aignan	DLF
Essonne	9th	Romain Colas	PS	Marie Guévenoux	LREM
Essonne	10th	Malek Boutih	PS	Pierre-Alain Raphan	LREM
Hauts-de-Seine	1st	Alexis Bachelay	PS	Elsa Faucillon	PCF
Hauts-de-Seine	2nd	Sébastien Pietrasanta*	PS	Adrien Taquet	LREM
Hauts-de-Seine	3rd	Jacques Kossowski*	LR	Christine Hennion	LREM
Hauts-de-Seine	4th	Jacqueline Fraysse*	FG (E)	Isabelle Florennes	LREM
Hauts-de-Seine	5th	Patrick Balkany*	LR	Céline Calvez	LREM
Hauts-de-Seine	6th	Jean-Christophe Fromantin*	DVD	Constance Le Grip	LR
Hauts-de-Seine	7th	Patrick Ollier*	LR	Jacques Marilossian	LREM
Hauts-de-Seine	8th	Jean-Jacques Guillet*	LR	Jacques Maire	LREM
Hauts-de-Seine	9th	Thierry Solère	LR	Thierry Solère	LR
Hauts-de-Seine	10th	André Santini*	UDI	Gabriel Attal	LREM
Hauts-de-Seine	11th	Julie Sommaruga	PS	Laurianne Rossi	LREM
Hauts-de-Seine	12th	Jean-Marc Germain	PS	Jean-Louis Bourlanges	MoDem
Hauts-de-Seine	13th	Patrick Devedjian*	LR	Frédérique Dumas	LREM
Seine-Saint-Denis	1st	Bruno Le Roux*	PS	Éric Coquerel	FI
Seine-Saint-Denis	2nd	Mathieu Hanotin	PS	Stéphane Peu	FI
Seine-Saint-Denis	3rd	Michel Pajon*	PS	Patrice Anato	LREM
Seine-Saint-Denis	4th	Marie-George Buffet	PCF	Marie-George Buffet	PCF
Seine-Saint-Denis	5th	Jean-Christophe Lagarde	UDI	Jean-Christophe Lagarde	UDI
Seine-Saint-Denis	6th	Élisabeth Guigou	PS	Bastien Lachaud	FI
Seine-Saint-Denis	7th	Razzy Hammadi	PS	Alexis Corbière	FI
Seine-Saint-Denis	8th	Élisabeth Pochon	PS	Sylvie Charrière	LREM
Seine-Saint-Denis	9th	Claude Bartolone*	PS	Sabine Rubin	FI
Seine-Saint-Denis	10th	Daniel Goldberg	PS	Alain Ramadier	LR
Seine-Saint-Denis	11th	François Asensi*	FG (E)	Clémentine Autain	FI (E)
Seine-Saint-Denis	12th	Pascal Popelin*	PS	Stéphane Testé	LREM
Val-de-Marne	1st	Sylvain Berrios*	LR	Frédéric Descrozaille	LREM
Val-de-Marne	2nd	Laurent Cathala*	PS	Jean François Mbaye	LREM
Val-de-Marne	3rd	Roger-Gérard Schwartzenberg*	PRG	Laurent Saint-Martin	LREM
Val-de-Marne	4th	Jacques-Alain Bénisti*	LR	Maud Petit	MoDem
Val-de-Marne	5th	Gilles Carrez	LR	Gilles Carrez	LR
Val-de-Marne	6th	Laurence Abeille	EELV	Guillaume Gouffier-Cha	LREM
Val-de-Marne	7th	Jean-Jacques Bridey	PS	Jean-Jacques Bridey	LREM
Val-de-Marne	8th	Michel Herbillon	LR	Michel Herbillon	LR
Val-de-Marne	9th	René Rouquet*	PS	Luc Carvounas	PS
Val-de-Marne	10th	Jean-Luc Laurent	MRC	Mathilde Panot	FI
Val-de-Marne	11th	Jean-Yves Le Bouillonnec*	PS	Albane Gaillot	LREM
Val-d'Oise	1st	Philippe Houillon*	LR	Isabelle Muller-Quoy	LREM
Val-d'Oise	2nd	Axel Poniatowski	LR	Guillaume Vuilletet	LREM
Val-d'Oise	3rd	Jean-Noël Carpentier*	MDP	Cécile Rilhac	LREM
Val-d'Oise	4th	Gérard Sebaoun*	PS	Naïma Moutchou	LREM
Val-d'Oise	5th	Philippe Doucet	PS	Fiona Lazaar	LREM
Val-d'Oise	6th	François Scellier*	LR	Nathalie Élimas	MoDem
Val-d'Oise	7th	Jérôme Chartier	LR	Dominique Da Silva	LREM
Val-d'Oise	8th	François Pupponi	PS	François Pupponi	PS
Val-d'Oise	9th	Jean-Pierre Blazy*	PS	Zivka Park	LREM
Val-d'Oise	10th	Dominique Lefebvre	PS	Aurélien Taché	LREM
Guadeloupe	1st	Éric Jalton*	DVG	Olivier Serva	LREM
Guadeloupe	2nd	Gabrielle Louis-Carabin*	DVG	Justine Bénin	DVG
Guadeloupe	3rd	Ary Chalus*	GUSR	Max Mathiasin	DVG
Guadeloupe	4th	Victorin Lurel*	PS	Hélène Vainqueur-Christophe	PS
Martinique	1st	Alfred Marie-Jeanne*	MIM	Josette Manin	DVG
Martinique	2nd	Bruno Nestor Azerot	DVG	Bruno Nestor Azerot	DVG
Martinique	3rd	Serge Letchimy	PPM	Serge Letchimy	PPM
Martinique	4th	Jean-Philippe Nilor	MIM	Jean-Philippe Nilor	MIM
French Guiana	1st	Gabriel Serville	PSG	Gabriel Serville	PSG
French Guiana	2nd	Chantal Berthelot	PRG	Lénaïck Adam	LREM
Réunion	1st	Philippe Naillet**	PS	Ericka Bareigts	PS
Réunion	2nd	Huguette Bello	PLR	Huguette Bello	PLR
Réunion	3rd	Jean-Jacques Vlody	PS	Nathalie Bassire	LR
Réunion	4th	Patrick Lebreton*	PS	David Lorion	LR
Réunion	5th	Jean-Claude Fruteau*	PS	Jean-Hugues Ratenon	DVG
Réunion	6th	Monique Orphé	PS	Nadia Ramassamy	LR
Réunion	7th	Thierry Robert	MoDem	Thierry Robert	MoDem
Mayotte	1st	Boinali Saïd	DVG	Ramlati Ali	PS
Mayotte	2nd	Ibrahim Aboubacar	PS	Mansour Kamardine	LR
New Caledonia	1st	Sonia Lagarde*	CE	Philippe Dunoyer	CE
New Caledonia	2nd	Philippe Gomès	CE	Philippe Gomès	CE
French Polynesia	1st	Maina Sage	Tapura	Maina Sage	Tapura
French Polynesia	2nd	Jonas Tahuaitu*	Tahoeraa	Nicole Sanquer	Tapura
French Polynesia	3rd	Jean-Paul Tuaiva	Tapura	Moetai Brotherson	Tavini
Saint-Pierre-et-Miquelon	1st	Stéphane Claireaux**	PRG	Annick Girardin	PRG
Wallis and Futuna	1st	Napole Polutele	DVG	Napole Polutele	DVG
Saint-Martin/Saint-Barthélemy	1st	Daniel Gibbs*	LR	Claire Javois	LR
French residents overseas	1st	Frédéric Lefebvre	LR	Roland Lescure	LREM
French residents overseas	2nd	Sergio Coronado	EELV	Paula Forteza	LREM
French residents overseas	3rd	Axelle Lemaire	PS	Alexandre Holroyd	LREM
French residents overseas	4th	Philip Cordery	PS	Pieyre-Alexandre Anglade	LREM
French residents overseas	5th	Arnaud Leroy*	PS	Samantha Cazebonne	LREM
French residents overseas	6th	Claudine Schmid	LR	Joachim Son-Forget	LREM
French residents overseas	7th	Pierre-Yves Le Borgn'	PS	Frédéric Petit	MoDem
French residents overseas	8th	Meyer Habib	UDI	Meyer Habib	UDI
French residents overseas	9th	Pouria Amirshahi*	DVG	M'jid El Guerrab	DIV
French residents overseas	10th	Alain Marsaud	LR	Amal Amélia Lakrafi	LREM
French residents overseas	11th	Thierry Mariani	LR	Anne Genetet	LREM
Source: Ministry of the Interior * Outgoing deputy not seeking re-election ** Outgoing substitute, attached deputy seeking re-election *** Outgoing PS deputies who failed to secure their party's investiture and running for re-election without label

== Aftermath ==
Composition of groups in the National Assembly

In the aftermath of the legislative elections, the split between Macron-compatible "constructives" within the Republicans (LR) and the rest of the party re-emerged. On 21 June, Thierry Solère announced the creation of a new common group in the National Assembly with the Union of Democrats and Independents (UDI) likely to contain the 18 UDI deputies and about 15 LR. The formation of two parliamentary groups on the right represented a symbolic divorce to the two threads on the right (the moderates and the hardliners) and the end of the old Union for a Popular Movement (UMP) which had been created in 2002 to unite the right and centre. The French Communist Party (PCF), la France Insoumise (FI), Socialist Party (PS), La République En Marche! (LREM), and Democratic Movement (MoDem) also sought to form separate parliamentary groups.

The legislative elections were followed on 19 June by the conclusion of the Philippe I government by courtesy and reappointment of Édouard Philippe as Prime Minister; though usually a formality, the formation of the Philippe II government was complicated by the ongoing affair regarding alleged improprieties in the employment practices of MoDem officials in the European Parliament and elsewhere. The request of Minister of the Armed Forces Sylvie Goulard to leave the government on 20 June was soon followed by the announcement on 21 June that both Minister of Justice François Bayrou and Minister in charge of European Affairs Marielle de Sarnez would depart the government, the two being the remaining MoDem officials within the government. In the reshuffle, Richard Ferrand, implicated in allegations of nepotism regarding a property sale, was transferred from his post in government as Minister of Territorial Cohesion as planned president of the LREM group in the National Assembly, and likewise for de Sarnez with the newly created MoDem group. Despite these changes, the MoDem remained within the government, with the announcement of the Philippe II government on 21 June. The Socialist group was ultimately refounded as the "New Left" (NG), and Marc Fesneau was elected president of the MoDem group.

Composition of the National Assembly as of 25 July 2017
Parliamentary group		Members	Related	Total	President
LREM	La République En Marche	310	4	314	Richard Ferrand
LR	The Republicans	95	5	100	Christian Jacob
MoDem	Democratic Movement	43	4	47	Marc Fesneau
LC	The Constructives: Republicans, UDI, and Independents	34	1	35	Franck Riester, Stéphane Demilly
NG	New Left	28	3	31	Olivier Faure
FI	La France Insoumise	17	0	17	Jean-Luc Mélenchon
GDR	Democratic and Republican Left	16	0	16	André Chassaigne
NI	Non-inscrits	–	–	17	–

=== Vote of confidence ===
In the vote of confidence in the new government on 4 July 2017, 370 voted in favor, 67 opposed, and 129 abstained, representing a record level of abstention and the lowest level of opposition since 1959.

Vote of confidence on 4 July 2017
For		Against		Abstentions		Non-voting	
370	LREM (305); MoDem (46); LC (12); NG (3); NI (3); LR (1)	67	LR (23); FI (17); GDR (12); NI (10); NG (5)	129	LR (75); LC (23); NG (23); GDR (4); NI (4)	11	LREM (9); LR (1); MoDem (1)

== See also ==
- List of deputies of the 15th National Assembly of France
- 15th legislature of the French Fifth Republic
- 2017 French presidential election
- 2017 French Senate election
