= Leila Aïchi =

French politician (born 1970)

Member of the French Senate for Paris
- In office 2011–2017

Personal details
- Born: 14 May 1970 (age 55) Beaumont-sur-Oise, France
- Party: Europe Ecology - The Greens
- Profession: Lawyer

Leila Aïchi (born 14 May 1970) is a French politician. She represents the department of Paris in the French Senate.

She was born in Beaumont-sur-Oise. A lawyer by profession, she was elected to the Senate on September 25, 2011.

She supported Emmanuel Macron in the 2017 French presidential election. She stood in the 2017 French legislative election as a miscellaneous right in the 9th constituency for French residents overseas but came in second place.

She holds a Master of Advanced Studies in business law, an MBA and a Diplôme d'études supérieures spécialisées in business management. A member of the Paris bar, she specializes in environmental issues.

Originally a member of Europe Ecology – The Greens (Europe Écologie Les Verts or EELV), in the 2015 regional election for Île-de-France, she supported Valérie Pécresse instead of Claude Bartolone. She also announced that she was leaving EELV.
