= Ninth French legislative constituency for citizens abroad =

Constituency of the French Fifth Republic

9th constituency for French residents overseas
- inline Constituency of the National Assembly of France

- Deputy: Karim Ben Cheïkh; G.s
- Department: None (overseas residents)
- Cantons: None
- Registered voters: 130,380

The ninth French legislative constituency for citizens abroad (French: neuvième circonscription des Français établis hors de France) is one of eleven constituencies each electing one representative of French people living outside France to the French National Assembly.

== Area ==
It covers all French citizens living in the following sixteen countries of North-West Africa: Algeria, Burkina Faso, Cape Verde, Côte d'Ivoire, the Gambia, Guinea, Guinea-Bissau, Liberia, Libya, Mali, Morocco, Mauritania, Niger, Senegal, Sierra Leone, and Tunisia. (It specifically excludes Western Sahara, which is recognised neither as a part of Morocco nor as a separate country, and is not a part of any constituency.) As of New Year's Day 2011, it contained 133,936 registered French voters – of which 41,129 in Morocco, 28,287 in Algeria, 19,995 in Tunisia, 16,817 in Senegal, and 13,094 in Côte d'Ivoire.

This constituency elected its first ever representative at the 2012 French legislative election.

== Deputies ==
Election	Member	Party
2012	Pouria Amirshahi	PS
2017	M'jid El Guerrab	LREM
2018	M'jid El Guerrab	PRV
2022	Karim Ben Cheïkh	G.s
2024	Karim Ben Cheïkh	G.s

== Election results ==
=== 2024 ===
Candidate	Party	Alliance	First round		Second round	
Candidate	Party	Alliance	Votes	%	Votes	%
Karim Ben Cheïkh	G.s	NFP	18,505	51.57	26,271	74.71
Samira Djouadi	RE	Ensemble	5,634	15.70	8,893	25.29
Elodie Charon	RN		3,817	10.64		
Ismaël Boudjekada	DVG		1,421	3.96		
Jihad Badreddine	LR	UDC	1,242	3.46		
Erwan Borhan Davoux	DVD		1,222	3.41		
Seddik Khalfi	DVG		1,171	3.26		
Rachid Tahiri	DIV		1,102	3.07		
Régina Ducellier	DVC		693	1.93		
Pierre Drevon	REC		311	0.87		
Hassan Oudrhiri	DIV		236	0.66		
Sébastien Perimony	DIV		172	0.48		
Kourtoum Sackho	DVD		117	0.33		
Gabriel Marie Sidibé	DIV		84	0.23		
Rania Tessa Maachou	DIV		61	0.17		
Hachim Fadili	DLF		53	0.15		
Edouard Tinaugus	DVG		20	0.06		
Khadija David	DVG		11	0.03		
Abdoulai Dianifaba	DIV		8	0.02		
Valid votes			35,880	100.00	35,164	100.00
Blank votes			592	1.62	1,890	5.08
Null votes			131	0.36	168	0.45
Turnout			36,603	28.07	37,222	28.55
Abstentions			93,784	71.93	93,158	71.45
Registered voters			130,387		130,380	
Result			G.s HOLD			

=== 2023 by-election ===
On January 20, 2023, the Constitutional Council invalidated the election due to a fault in the electronic voting system.

2023 by-election: 9th constituency for French citizens overseas
Party	Candidate	Votes	%	±%
G.s (NUPÉS)	Karim Ben Cheïkh	5,291	43.24	+3.25
RE (Ensemble)	Caroline Traverse	1,996	16.31	-11.75
PRV	M'jid El Guerrab	1,884	15.40	+14.67
REC	André Chouk	745	6.09	+0.59
LR (UDC)	Édouard de Castellan	679	5.55	+0.93
MoDem	Oumar Ba*	468	3.82	+3.32
DVE	Samira Herbal	332	2.71	+1.46
Others	N/A	841	6.89	−
Turnout		12,833	10.22	−4.49
2nd round result
G.s (NUPÉS)	Karim Ben Cheïkh	8,059	67.65	+13.58
RE (Ensemble)	Caroline Traverse	3,853	32.35	−13.58
Turnout				
G.s hold				

* MoDem dissident, not endorsed by Ensemble Citoyens

=== 2022 ===
Legislative Election 2022: 9th constituency for French citizens overseas
Party	Candidate	Votes	%	±%
G.s (NUPÉS)	Karim Ben Cheïkh	6,906	39.99	+15.03
LREM (Ensemble)	Élisabeth Moreno	4,845	28.06	+9.13
HOR	Mehdi Reddad*	1,072	6.21	N/A
REC	Nathalie Amiot	949	5.50	N/A
DVD	Mohamed Oulkhouir	902	5.22	N/A
LR (UDC)	Naïma M'Faddel	798	4.62	−12.63
Others	N/A	1,796	-	−
Turnout		17,268	14.71	+0.14
2nd round result
G.s (NUPÉS)	Karim Ben Cheïkh	11,348	54.07	N/A
LREM (Ensemble)	Élisabeth Moreno	9,639	45.93	−13.73
Turnout		20,987	18.12	+6.40
G.s gain from LREM				

* Horizons dissident, not endorsed by Ensemble Citoyens

=== 2017 ===
Candidate	Label	First round		Second round	
Candidate	Label	Votes	%	Votes	%
Leila Aïchi	DVD	3,135	20.29	4,491	40.34
M'jid El Guerrab	DIV	2,925	18.93	6,642	59.66
Erwan Borhan Davoux	LR	2,039	13.20		
Didier Le Bret	PS	1,822	11.79		
Patrice Finel	FI	1,423	9.21		
Frédéric Elbar	DVD	814	5.27		
Pascal Capdevielle	UDI	626	4.05		
Karim Dendène	DVD	538	3.48		
Yann Roustan	ECO	462	2.99		
Jacqueline Nizet	DVD	421	2.73		
Jehanne Fortin	FN	352	2.28		
Charlotte de Labarre	DVD	165	1.07		
Lamine Camara	PCF	150	0.97		
Mathilde Darras	DIV	109	0.71		
Loïc Durand	EXD	78	0.50		
Nadia Bourgeois-Chebah	ECO	75	0.49		
Khadija David	DIV	63	0.41		
Naji Debache	DLF	61	0.39		
Nathalie Gomez	DIV	61	0.39		
Loubna Zaïr	DVG	38	0.25		
Saâdia Messaoudia	DIV	35	0.23		
Marie-Laure Fabresse	PRG	24	0.16		
Sabrina Houd	DVD	15	0.10		
Jean-Christophe Thomas	DIV	14	0.09		
Héléna Besnard	DIV	3	0.02		
Rami Zouaoui	DVG	1	0.01		
Yves-Éric Massiani	DIV	0	0.00		
Votes		15,449	100.00	11,133	100.00
Valid votes		15,449	98.33	11,133	88.12
Blank votes		140	0.89	1,141	9.03
Null votes		122	0.78	360	2.85
Turnout		15,711	14.57	12,634	11.72
Abstentions		92,085	85.43	95,144	88.28
Registered voters		107,796		107,778	
Source: Ministry of the Interior

=== 2012 ===
==== Candidates ====
The list of candidates was officially finalised on 14 May. There were fourteen candidates:

The Union for a Popular Movement chose Khadija Doukkali, a resident of Morocco. André Duclos was her deputy (suppléant).

The Socialist Party chose Pouria Amirshahi, with Martine Vautrin-Djedidi as his deputy (suppléante).

The Left Front chose Laetitia Suchecki, a member of the French Communist Party. Her deputy was Jean Lemaire, a high school philosophy teacher in Casablanca.

The Democratic Movement initially chose Frédérique Ruggieri as its candidate, with Jean-François Caracci as her deputy (suppléant). The two, however, put an end to their joint ticket due to "differing points of view on certain international issues such as Syria or Palestine"; Caracci accused Ruggieri of arrogance and narrow-mindedness. Caracci withdrew from the election, while Ruggieri became an independent candidate (with Patrick Collier as deputy). The Democratic Movement endorsed Sihame Arbib in her place, with Lïla Bali as his deputy.

Europe Écologie–The Greens initially chose Guilhem Calvo, with Laurence Bonneterre as his deputy (suppléante). A resident of Morocco, Calvo was a consultant on issues of biodiversity and climate change. It was subsequently announced, however, that Zine-Eddine M'jati, born and raised in Casablanca before he moved to France and entered French politics, would be the party's candidate, still with Laurence Bonneterre as deputy.

The National Front chose Alexandra Piel, with Franck Levesque as her deputy.

The Republican, Ecologist and Social Alliance, a centrist alliance which included in particular the centre-right Radical Party, chose Bertrand Vitu. Rachida El Amrani was his deputy.

The centre-left Radical Party of the Left chose Aicha Guendouze, with Fodé Sylla as her deputy.

Solidarity and Progress, the French branch of the LaRouche movement, was represented by Yves Paumier, with Guy Pirod as his deputy.

Karim Dendène, a member of the Union for a Popular Movement, had sought the endorsement of that party. When he did not obtain it, he decided to stand nonetheless. Having been suspended from the party as a consequence, he stood for the "Gathering of French residents Overseas" (Rassemblement des Français de l'étranger). He was a general practitioner in Algiers. His deputy was Véronique Brigaud.

Yannick Urrien was an independent right-wing candidate. Born and raised in Casablanca, he was a media entrepreneur. His deputy was Matthias Hébert.

Alexandre Foulon was an independent left-wing candidate. An independent consultant on public policy for "several countries" in Africa, he had a home in both Casablanca and Abidjan, and alternates between the two. His deputy was Tristan Calas.

Alain Le Moullec was an independent candidate defining himself as a centrist and a social Gaullist. His deputy was Mohamed Khatiri.

==== Campaign ====
Campaigning was rendered difficult by the sheer size of the constituency. Senegalese media, however, reportedly took an active interest in the election, and relayed information and elements of the campaign to their readers and viewers – including of course French residents in Senegal, and persons with dual Senegalese and French citizenship.

A single debate was organised between the candidates, in a restaurant in Casablanca on June 30. Seven of the fourteen candidates took part, including Pouria Amirshahi (Socialist), Sihame Arbib (MoDem), Jean-Malick Lemaire (Left Front), and Zine-Eddine M'jati (EELV). In addition, the UMP sent a representative, but not its candidate, who indicated she was busy campaigning in Côte d'Ivoire. The debate enabled members of the audience to question candidates directly. In addition to the issue of fees for access to French schools abroad, which the main candidates all promised to act upon, several members of the audience asked for François Hollande to rapidly keep his promise to give the right to vote to foreign residents in France in local elections, as this would enable French residents to vote in local elections in Morocco, which grants this right on the basis of reciprocity.

==== Results ====
As in the other expatriate constituencies, turnout in the first round was low. It was at its lowest in Libya (6.7%), and within the fairly large French community in Algeria (9.7%). The highest turnout in this constituency was in Burkina Faso (32.6%). Socialist candidate Pouria Amirshahi finished first by a very large margin, almost taking the seat in the first round (47.23%). All but three of the candidates finished below 5% of the vote; dissident UMP candidate Karim Dendène, standing against his own party, obtained 7.22%, but was far behind Amirshahi and the UMP's official candidate Khadija Doukkali.

Amirshahi finished first in every country except in Côte d'Ivoire, and among the very small number of voters in Libya (where he received five votes to Doukali's eleven) and Guinea-Bissau (two votes to Doukali's seven). Côte d'Ivoire is the only country in the region in which the UMP's Khadija Doukkali finished first within a fairly sizable electorate, with 47.99% of the vote. (France's UMP government had led a military intervention in Côte d'Ivoire to help bring an end to the 2011 civil war.) In Tunisia, Amirshahi obtained 56.15% of the vote. He obtained 57.93% in Mali.

Legislative Election 2012: Overseas residents 9 – 2nd round
Party	Candidate	Votes	%	±%
PS	Pouria Amirshahi	10,851	62.39	–
UMP	Khadija Doukkali	6,541	37.61	–
Turnout		17,392	12.99	
PS win (new seat)				

Legislative Election 2012: Overseas residents 9 – 1st round
Party	Candidate	Votes	%	±%
PS	Pouria Amirshahi	8,000	47.23	–
UMP	Khadija Doukkali	4,204	24.82	–
DVD	Karim Dendène	1,223	7.22	–
FG	Laetitia Suchecki	743	4.39	–
EELV	Zine-Eddine M'jati	637	3.76	–
FN	Alexandra Piel	606	3.58	–
MoDem	Sihame Arbib	332	1.96	–
DVD	Yannick Urrien	312	1.84	–
PRG	Aicha Guendouze	194	1.15	–
Independent	Frédérique Ruggieri	189	1.12	–
ARES	Betrand Vitu	173	1.02	–
Independent	Alain Le Moullec	172	1.02	–
SP	Yves Paumier	85	0.50	–
DVG	Alexandre Foulon	70	0.41	–
Turnout		16,940	12.65	n/a
