= Karim Ben Cheïkh =

French politician (born 1977)

Member of the National Assembly for the Ninth Overseas Constituency
- Incumbent
- Assumed office 17 April 2023
- Preceded by: Vacant
- In office 22 June 2022 – 20 January 2023
- Preceded by: M'jid El Guerrab
- Succeeded by: Vacant

Personal details
- Born: 19 March 1977 (age 49) Tunis, Tunisia
- Party: Génération.s
- Education: Sciences Po, Paris 1 Panthéon-Sorbonne University

Karim Ben Cheïkh (born 19 March 1977) is a Tunisia-born French politician who has represented the ninth constituency for French residents overseas in the National Assembly since 2022.

== See also ==
- List of deputies of the 16th National Assembly of France
