= M'jid El Guerrab =

French politician (born 1983)

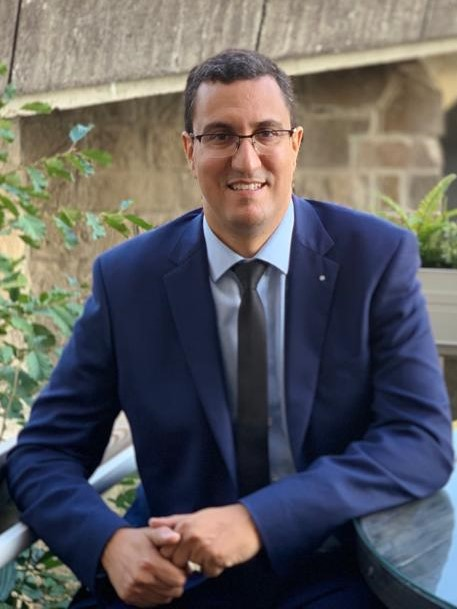

Member of the National Assembly for the Ninth Overseas constituency
- In office 21 June 2017 – 21 June 2022
- Preceded by: Pouria Amirshahi
- Succeeded by: Karim Ben Cheïkh

Personal details
- Born: 25 April 1983 (age 43) Aurillac, France
- Party: PS (1997-2017); LREM (2017-2018); MR (since 2018)
- Education: Sciences Po Aix

M'jid El Guerrab (born 25 April 1983) is a French politician of the Radical Movement (MR) who was elected as a member of the National Assembly on 19 June 2017, representing the 9th district of French people living abroad, which includes the Maghreb and part of West Africa.

== Early life ==
El Guerrab, the son of Moroccan immigrants, was born on 25 April 1983 in Aurillac.

== Political career ==
El Guerrab joined the Socialist Party at the age of 14. From 2006, he worked on the staff of Ségolène Royal.

In parliament, El Guerrab served on the Defence Committee (2017–2018) and the Finance Committee (2017–2019) before moving to the Committee on Foreign Affairs.

In addition to his committee assignments, El Guerrab is part of the French parliamentary friendship groups with Burkina Faso, Liberia and Mali.

After he was indicted in September 2017, El Guerrab was threatened with expulsion from LREM and subsequently announced his departure from the party.

== Controversy ==
In September 2017, El Guerrab was detained by police after a fight with Socialist Party lawmaker Boris Faure; Faure was hospitalized after El Guerrab hit him with a motorcycle helmet. In 2022 he was sentenced to 3 years in prison for the assault.
