= Franck Briffaut =

French politician

Mayor of Villers-Cotterêts
- Incumbent
- Assumed office 5 April 2014

Personal details
- Born: 10 March 1958 (age 68) Paris
- Party: National Rally

Franck Briffaut (born March 10, 1958, in Paris) is a French politician.

He was born on 10 March 1958. He has been the mayor of Villers-Cotterêts since 2014.

Briffaut has been married twice and is the father of two children.
