= Pouria Amirshahi =

French politician (born 1972)

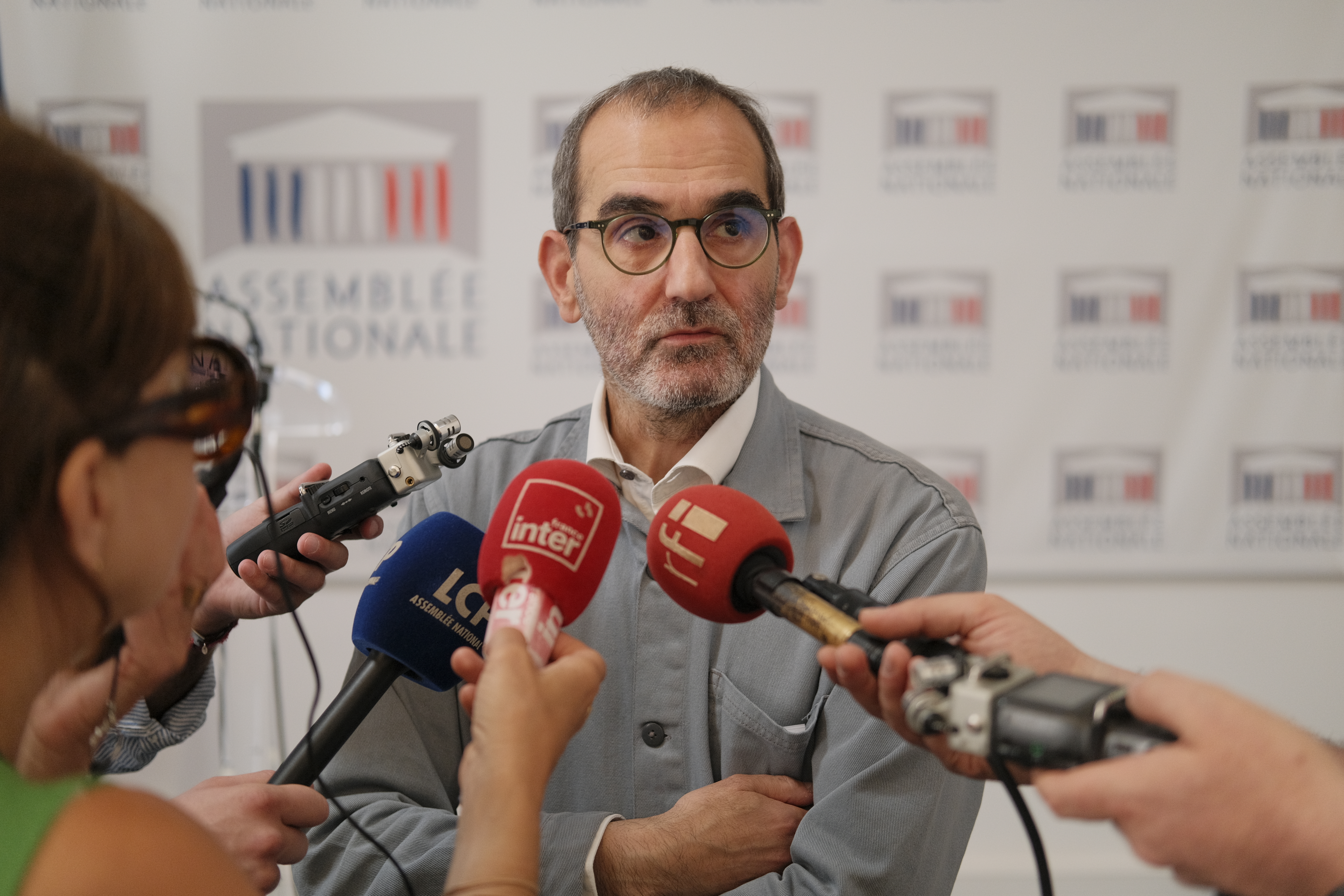
- Amirshahi in 2025

Member of the National Assembly
- Incumbent
- Assumed office 18 July 2024
- Preceded by: Julien Bayou
- Constituency: Paris's 5th constituency
- In office 20 June 2012 – 27 June 2017
- Preceded by: Constituency established
- Succeeded by: M'jid El Guerrab
- Constituency: Ninth Overseas Constituency

Personal details
- Born: 27 March 1972 (age 54) Shemiran, Iran
- Citizenship: France • Iran
- Party: The Ecologists (2024–present)
- Other political affiliations: Socialist Party (1988–1994; 2002–2016); Independent (1994–2002; 2016–2024)
- Children: 1
- Education: Pantheon-Sorbonne University

Pouria Amirshahi (born 27 March 1972) is a French politician. He was a member of the National Assembly for the Ninth constituency for French residents overseas.

In June 2025, Amirshahi's visa application to the United States was rejected. He had planned to travel to Washington, D.C. and Boston to meet with progressive lawmakers. Amirshahi had initially applied for an Electronic System for Travel Authorization (ESTA) which was rejected, before applying for a standard visa and being banned from entering the United States.
