= 2022 French legislative election for French citizens living abroad =

2022 French legislative election (overseas)
4–19 June 2022

All 11 overseas constituencies of the National Assembly 6 seats needed for a majority
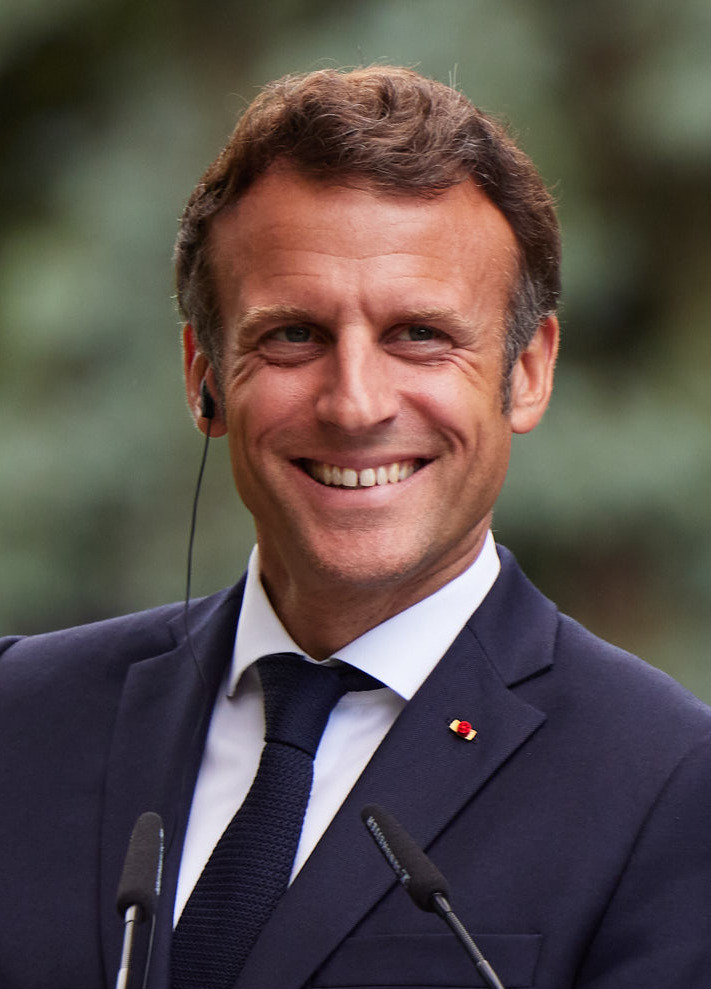

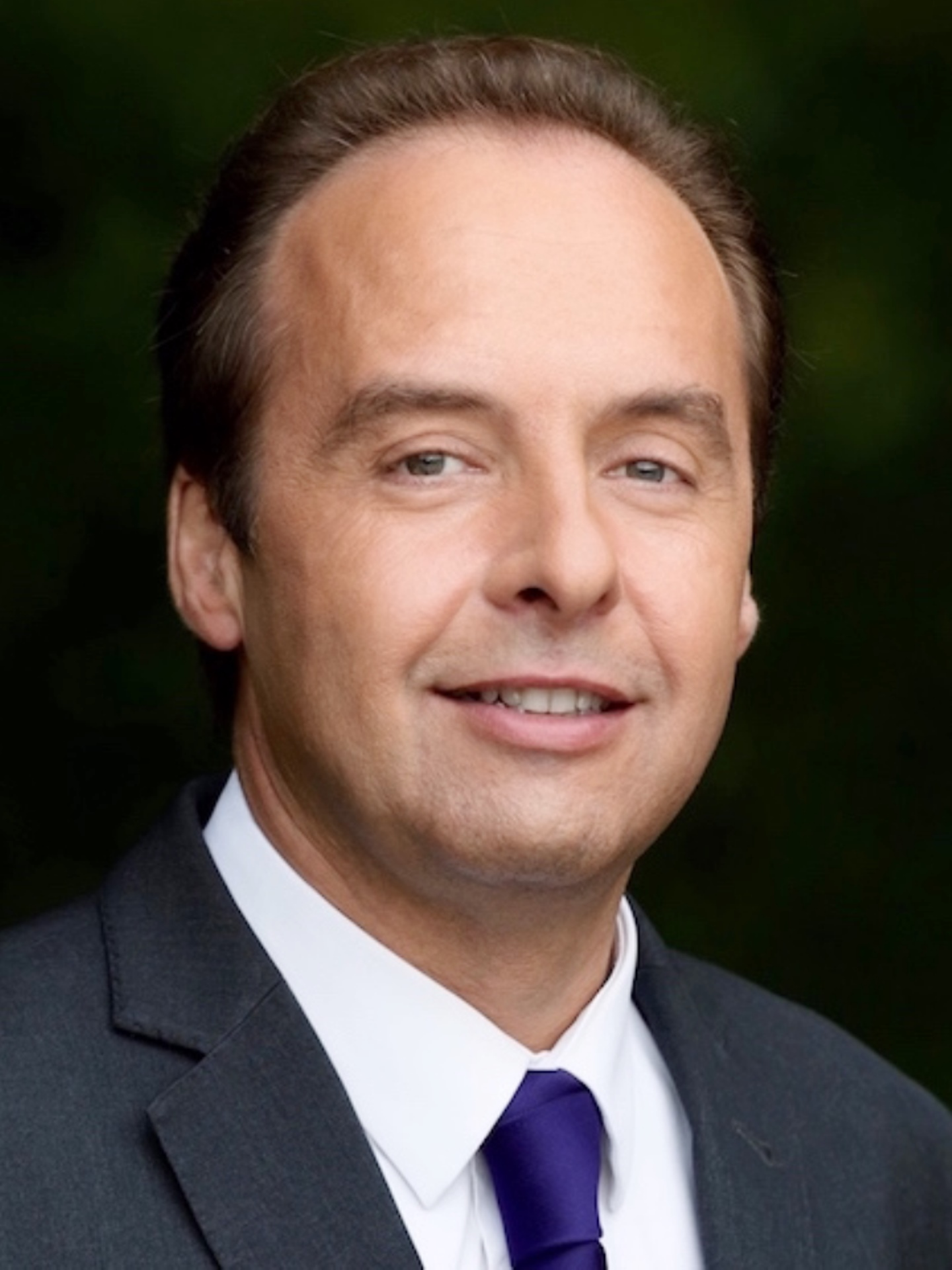

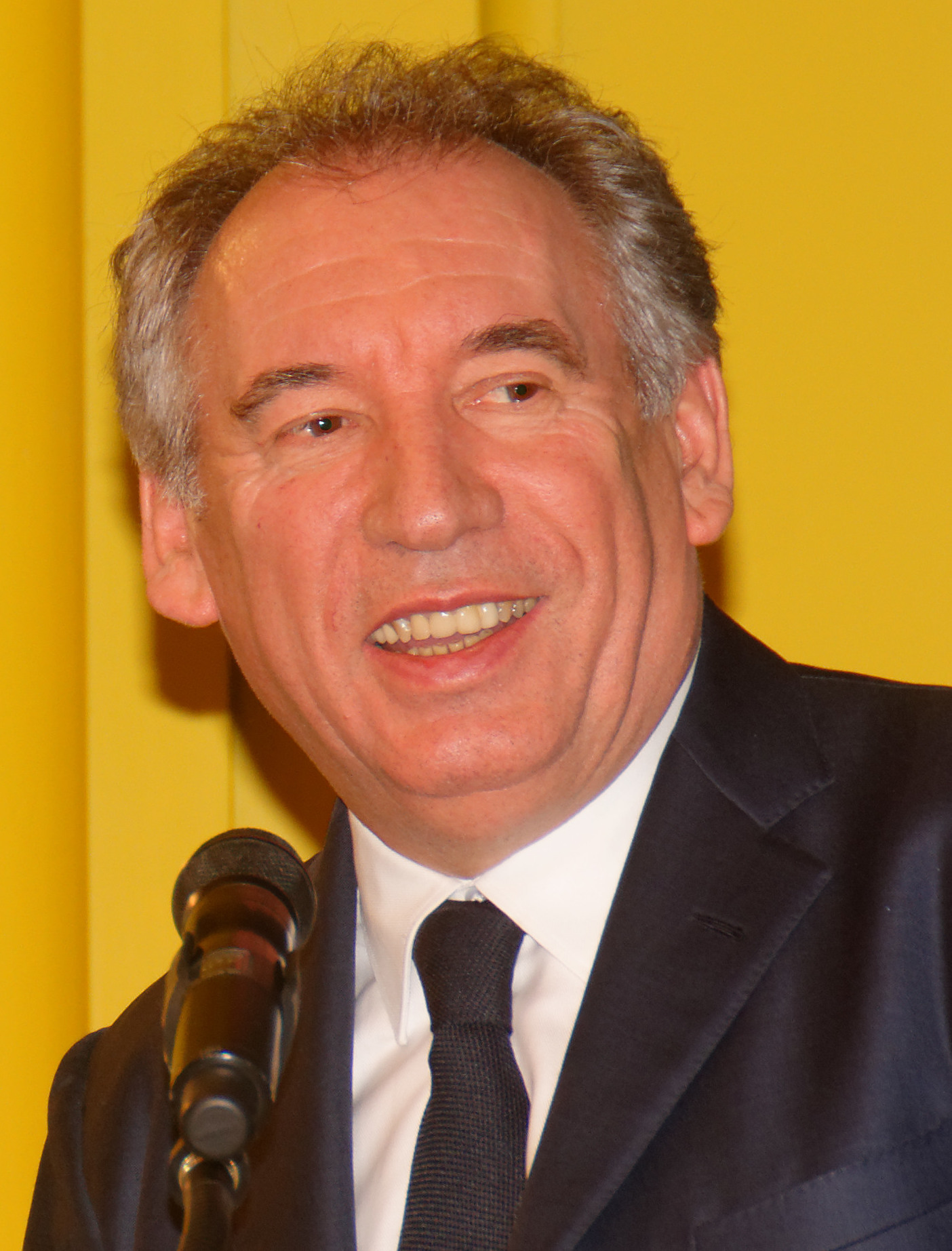

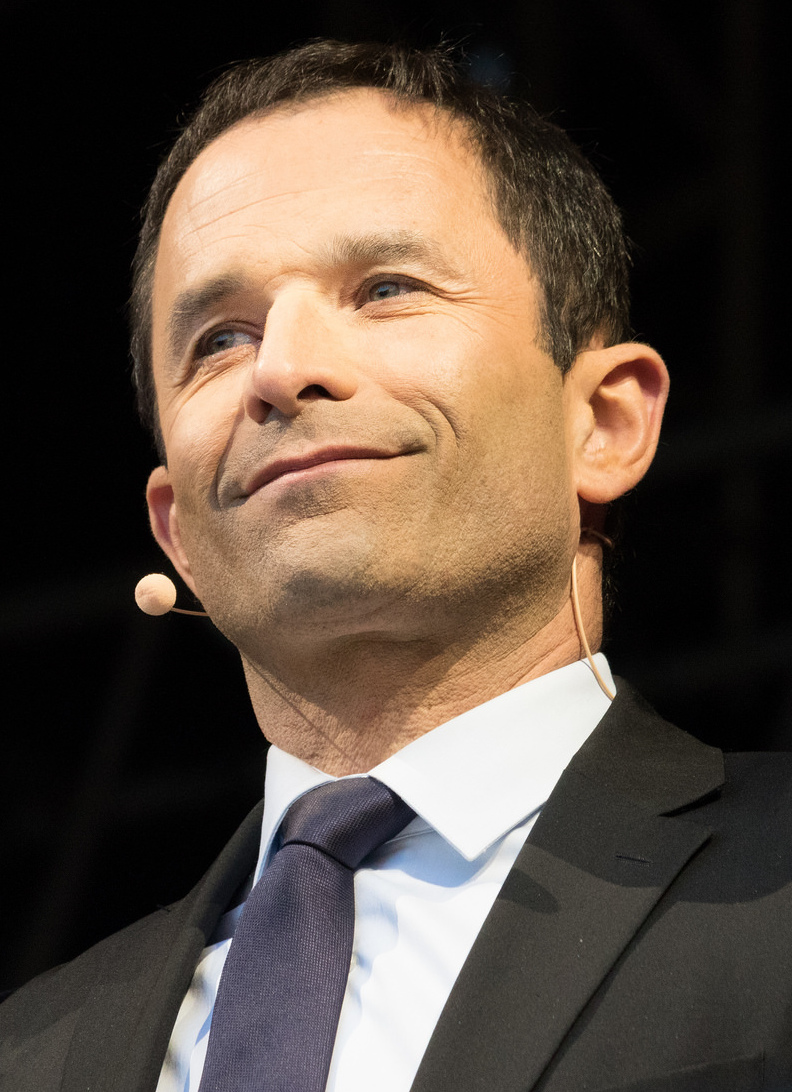
	Majority party	Minority party
Leader	Emmanuel Macron	Jean-Christophe Lagarde
Party	RE	UDI
Seats before	6	1
Seats won	8	1
Seat change	▲2	Steady
	Third party	Fourth party
Leader	François Bayrou	Benoît Hamon
Party	MoDem	G.s
Seats before	1	0
Seats won	1	1
Seat change	Steady	▲1
- Results by constituency.
President before election
Emmanuel Macron
LREM
Elected President
Emmanuel Macron
RE

The 2022 French legislative election occurred on 4 and 18 June 2022 (America and Caribbean Zone) and 5 and 19 June 2022 (Rest of the world). In the single member constituencies for French residents overseas, 11 deputies were elected, representing French people living outside France. It is the third time French citizens living abroad will be represented in the National Assembly after the previous elections in 2012 and 2017.

== Results ==
Constituency	Outgoing MP	Party	Group	Elected MP	Party or nuance	Group
French residents overseas' 1st constituency	Roland Lescure	LREM	LREM	Roland Lescure	LREM	RE
French residents overseas' 2nd constituency	Paula Forteza*	EDS	NI	Éléonore Caroit	LREM	RE
French residents overseas' 3rd constituency	Alexandre Holroyd	LREM	LREM	Alexandre Holroyd	LREM	RE
French residents overseas' 4th constituency	Pieyre-Alexandre Anglade	LREM	LREM	Pieyre-Alexandre Anglade	LREM	RE
French residents overseas' 5th constituency	Stéphane Vojetta	LREM	LREM	Stéphane Vojetta	LREM diss.	RE
French residents overseas' 6th constituency	Joachim Son-Forget	R!	NI	Marc Ferracci	LREM	RE
French residents overseas' 7th constituency	Frédéric Petit	MoDem	MoDem	Frédéric Petit	MoDem	DEM
French residents overseas' 8th constituency	Meyer Habib	UDI	UDI	Meyer Habib	UDI	app. LR
French residents overseas' 9th constituency	M'jid El Guerrab*	PRV	AE	Karim Ben Cheïkh	G.s	ÉCO
French residents overseas' 10th constituency	Amal Amélia Lakrafi	LREM	LREM	Amal Amélia Lakrafi	LREM	RE
French residents overseas' 11th constituency	Anne Genetet	LREM	LREM	Anne Genetet	LREM	RE
