= French legislative constituencies for citizens abroad =

Legislative constituencies for French people domiciled outside France (French: Circonscriptions législatives des Français établis hors de France) are eleven constituencies, returning one member each to the French National Assembly, elected by French people living outside France. As of 2024, the constituencies represent almost 1.7 million French voters in total.

They were created by the 2010 redistricting of French legislative constituencies, the aim of which was to enable expatriates to be represented as such, rather than vote remotely for a constituency on French territory, as was the case previously. Their creation does not increase the overall number of seats in the Assembly, which remains stable at 577, since it is compensated for by a redrawing of boundaries which reduces the number of seats in France itself to 566. These measures were implemented for the 2012 legislative election. There have also been senators representing overseas citizens since 1982; they are elected indirectly, by the Assembly of French Citizens Abroad.

== History ==
=== Creation ===
The 2010 creation of these constituencies created some controversy, when Le Monde estimated that they would be far more favourable to the main centre-right party, the Union for a Popular Movement (UMP), then in power, than to the main centre-left party, the Socialist Party (PS). The newspaper pointed out that, in nine of these constituencies, a majority of voters appeared to favour the right, based on the figures from the 2007 presidential election. The constituency of Central and Eastern Europe and that of Northwest Africa were the only ones to appear left-leaning. While Le Monde provided the figures without comment, left-wing politicians such as Jean-Jacques Urvoas, a Socialist member of the National Assembly, suggested that the government was attempting to provide itself with extra seats; Jean-Paul Lecoq, a Communist member of the National Assembly, suggested overseas citizens should continue to vote solely in French constituencies.

=== 2012 legislative election ===
Contrary to expectations, candidates supported by the Socialist Party won seven of the eleven constituencies in the 2012 election, with their parliamentary allies in Europe Ecology – The Greens (EELV) winning one and the UMP winning three. Two of the winning Socialist candidates were later disqualified by the Constitutional Council due to campaign finance irregularities. They were replaced in by-elections by a candidate from the UMP and a candidate from the centre-right Union of Democrats and Independents (UDI), leaving the overseas constituencies with five MPs from the Socialist Party, four from the UMP (which in 2015 changed its name to The Republicans), one from EELV and one from the UDI.

=== 2017 legislative election ===
In the 2017 election, Emmanuel Macron's party La République En Marche! (REM) won a majority of seats in the National Assembly nationwide and also was the most successful party in the overseas constituencies, winning 8 of the 11 seats. Another constituency went to a candidate from the Democratic Movement (MoDem), which is allied with REM in the legislature. One UDI candidate retained his seat; one seat was won by an independent candidate.

=== 2022 legislative election ===
In the 2022 election, En Marche retained a majority of overseas constituencies, but did lose the 9th constituency to Génération.s.

== Geography ==
The eleven constituencies (note Bhutan, North Korea and Western Sahara in grey)

The Americas are divided into two constituencies, North and South (1 and 2); Europe into six (3 to 8), with the eighth constituency also incorporating Israel; Africa is divided into two (9 and 10), with the tenth constituency also incorporating the Arabian peninsula as well as Iraq, Syria and Lebanon. The eleventh constituency, the largest, includes every other country in Asia, as well as the entirety of Oceania, along with Belarus, Moldova and Ukraine.

Overseas departments and territories of France are not included, as they are de jure part of France, and already have their own electoral constituencies. In addition, North Korea, which is not diplomatically recognised by France, is not part of any constituency. The same is true of Bhutan. Kosovo, which is recognised by France, is part of the seventh constituency. Taiwan is incorporated into the eleventh constituency as part of China, as France recognises the One China policy. Western Sahara is not part of any constituency – being neither recognised as part of Morocco, nor included in the ninth constituency in its own right. The status of the Palestinian territories is not explicitly defined, but French residents there were able to vote, as part of the same constituency as Israel. Other self-proclaimed and de facto but non-recognised independent countries, such as Somaliland or Abkhazia, are incorporated as part of the country which claims sovereignty over them.

== List of constituencies ==
Constituency	Region	Number of countries	Registered voters (2024)	Member	Portrait	Party	Election
First	Canada and the United States	2	265,898	Roland Lescure		RE	2017
Second	Mexico, Central America, the Caribbean and South America	33	81,786	Éléonore Caroit		RE	2022
Third	British Isles, Northern Europe, Greenland and Baltic States	10	160,627	Vincent Caure		RE	2024
Fourth	The Benelux	3	158,035	Pieyre-Alexandre Anglade		RE	2017
Fifth	Andorra, Monaco, Portugal and Spain	4	115,497	vacant			
Sixth	Liechtenstein and Switzerland	2	159,733	Marie-Ange Rousselot		RE	2024
Seventh	Germany, Austria and Eastern Europe	16	130,815	Frédéric Petit		MoDem	2017
Eighth	Southern Europe, Israel, the Palestinian territories	8	148,948	Caroline Yadan		RE	2024
Ninth	Maghreb	16	130,380	Karim Ben Cheïkh		Génération.s	2022
Tenth	Central, Eastern and Southern Africa, much of the Middle East	48	113,835	Amal Amélia Lakrafi		RE	2017
Eleventh	Belarus, Ukraine, Russia, Moldova, Oceania, most of Asia	49	137,852	Anne Genetet		RE	2017

== Electoral results ==
=== 2012 ===
The 2012 legislative election resulted in the election of the very first National Assembly members representing French residents overseas.

Voting occurred over a week, from 23 to 29 May or on 2 or 3 June for the first round, well in advance of voting in metropolitan France (10 June) or certain French overseas territories and departments (9 June). Second round voting occurred from 6 to 12 June or on 16 or 17 June (as opposed to 17 June alone in metropolitan France). Unlike their compatriots in France itself, expatriates could vote by postal ballot or over the Internet, though they could of course vote in person in their local consulate. The date depends on voters' location and the method by which they cast their ballot. If an expatriate voted via the Internet, he or she had a week to do so from 23 to 26 May. A postal ballot could be cast, if received by 31 May in the Americas or by 1 June in the rest of the world. Those who preferred to vote in person in their local consulate had to do so on 2 June in the Americas or 3 June in the rest of the world.

In April 2011, the ruling Union for a Popular Movement chose several prominent members to stand as candidates overseas. Frédéric Lefebvre, Secretary of State for Commerce, was chosen as the UMP candidate for the first constituency; Éric Besson, Minister of Industry, for the fifth; Thierry Mariani, Secretary of State for Transport, for the eleventh. By contrast, the Socialist Party preferred to select long-term residents of their respective constituencies, who are active in their local community but generally unknown in national French politics. Numerous other parties presented candidates, in particular the Democratic Movement (MoDem) and the Left Front (FG). Many independent candidates were also present in all consistencies.

In the first round, the Socialist Party finished first in six constituencies, while a Socialist-endorsed Green candidate finished first in the second constituency (Central America, Caribbean and South America). The Union for a Popular Movement finished first in the other three (the fifth, tenth and eleventh). The second round, in every constituency except the second, was a run-off between the Socialist Party and the UMP. The second round confirmed this trend, with the left taking eight seats, and the UMP only three. This was a significant surprise; early indications had been that most of the seats would go to the right. Indeed, the UMP government had been accused of having created these constituencies so as to establish right-wing safe seats. The left's victory in North America was described as "incredible", and explained, by commentators in Libération, as being due to Socialist candidate Corinne Narassiguin's strong and active campaign, and local voters' rejection of UMP candidate Frédéric Lefebvre, perceived as knowing little about North America and as barely speaking English.

Turnout was particularly low in every constituency (from 13 to 28%). A number of expatriates, living far from any polling station, said they had been unable to vote online, because they had not received the necessary login codes, or because of errors when they attempted to log in and cast their vote. Others said they had abstained deliberately, considering that they should not be voting in an election when the results would primarily affect residents of France. Others considered that the candidates were necessarily ill-suited to represent the interests of expatriates scattered over often vast and diverse territories. Based on projections from the 2007 presidential election results, the carving of constituencies should have resulted in a 9-to-2 division of the seats between the UMP and the Socialists, however French expatriates ended up electing seven Socialists, one Green (Europe Écologie - Les Verts) and three UMP deputies. The results were likely impacted by low turnout and support for Francois Hollande following his presidential election.

In February 2013, the elections of Socialist members of the National Assembly Corinne Narassiguin and Daphna Poznanski-Benhamou were annulled by the Constitutional Council, due to irregularities in the funding of their electoral campaigns. They were barred from standing for public office for a period of one year. Four defeated right-wing candidates in their two constituencies were also barred from standing for public office for a year, for the same reason.

Elected members of the National Assembly

Constituency	Name	Party	Majority
First	Corinne Narassiguin	PS	8.02%
Second	Sergio Coronado	EELV	12.80%
Third	Axelle Lemaire	PS	9.52%
Fourth	Philip Cordery	PS	6.32%
Fifth	Arnaud Leroy	PS	5.34%
Sixth	Claudine Schmid	UMP	15.08%
Seventh	Pierre-Yves Le Borgn'	PS	13.80%
Eighth	Daphna Poznanski-Benhamou	PS	11.76%
Ninth	Pouria Amirshahi	PS	24.78%
Tenth	Alain Marsaud	UMP	6.26%
Eleventh	Thierry Mariani	UMP	4.3%

=== 2017 ===
Elected members of the National Assembly

Constituency	Name	Party	2nd round vote share
First	Roland Lescure	REM	79.73%
Second	Paula Forteza	REM	60.92%
Third	Alexandre Holroyd	REM	70.11%
Fourth	Pieyre-Alexandre Anglade	REM	73.73%
Fifth	Samantha Cazebonne	REM	53.96%
Sixth	Joachim Son-Forget	REM	74.94%
Seventh	Frédéric Petit	MoDem	62.94%
Eighth	Meyer Habib	UDI	57.86%
Ninth	M'jid El Guerrab	SE	59.66%
Tenth	Amal Amélia Lakrafi	REM	71.25%
Eleventh	Anne Genetet	REM	71.72%

=== 2022 ===
Constituency	Name	Party	2nd round vote share
First	Roland Lescure	LREM	55.63%
Second	Éléonore Caroit	LREM	57.42%
Third	Alexandre Holroyd	LREM	55.80%
Fourth	Pieyre-Alexandre Anglade	LREM	55.15%
Fifth	Stéphane Vojetta	LREM d.	57.26%
Sixth	Marc Ferracci	LREM	64.97%
Seventh	Frédéric Petit	MoDem	60.21%
Eighth	Meyer Habib	UDI	53.99%
Ninth	Karim Ben Cheïkh	G.s	54.07%
Tenth	Amal Amélia Lakrafi	LREM	63.58%
Eleventh	Anne Genetet	LREM	61.73%

== See also ==
- Overseas constituencies of the Parliament of Italy
