= 2024 French legislative election for French Residents Overseas =

Parliamentary constituencies for French residents overseas. 1st: Canada and United States 2nd: Central America, Caribbean and South America 3rd: Northern Europe 4th: Benelux 5th: Andorra, Monaco, Portugal and Spain 6th: Liechtenstein and Switzerland 7th: Central and Eastern Europe 8th: Southern Europe, Israel (and Palestine), Turkey 9th: North-west Africa 10th: Central, Eastern and Southern Africa, much of the Middle East 11th: Belarus, Ukraine, Russia, Moldova, Oceania, most of Asia No constituency: Bhutan, North Korea, Western Sahara

Following the first round of the 2024 French legislative election on 30 June 2024, runoff elections in each constituency where no candidate received a vote share greater than 50 percent were scheduled for 7 July. Candidates permitted to stand in the runoff elections needed to either come in first or second place in the first round or achieve more than 12.5 percent of the votes of the entire electorate (as opposed to 12.5 percent of the vote share due to low turnout).

== French Residents Overseas ==
=== 1st constituency ===
Candidate	Party or alliance		First round		Second round	
Candidate	Party or alliance		Votes	%	Votes	%
Roland Lescure	Ensemble	Renaissance	36,363	38.84	50,333	54.25
Oussama Laraichi	New Popular Front	The Ecologists	33,822	36.12	42,439	45.75
Jennifer Adam	National Rally		10,018	10.70		
Olivier Piton	The Republicans		4,856	5.19		
Véronique Jackson	Miscellaneous centre	Independent	4,643	4.96		
Elias Forneris	Miscellaneous right	Independent	1,414	1.51		
Alexandra Pourchet	Reconquête		1,357	1.45		
Greg Lacoste	Independent		1,090	1.16		
Paloma Ladam	Miscellaneous left	Independent	67	0.07		
Total			93,630	100.00	92,772	100.00
Valid votes			93,630	98.81	92,772	94.79
Invalid votes			90	0.09	142	0.15
Blank votes			1,039	1.10	4,958	5.07
Total votes			94,759	100.00	97,872	100.00
Registered voters/turnout			265,932	35.63	265,898	36.81

=== 2nd constituency ===
Candidate	Party or alliance		First round		Second round	
Candidate	Party or alliance		Votes	%	Votes	%
Sergio Coronado	New Popular Front	The Ecologists	6,952	33.80	9,947	53.27
Eléonore Caroit	Ensemble	Renaissance	6,440	31.31	8,725	46.73
Marie-Nathalie Goncalves	National Rally		2,553	12.41		
Bertrand Dupont	The Republicans		1,905	9.26		
Jessica Agostini	Miscellaneous centre	Independent	987	4.80		
Nora Courmontagne	Reconquête		373	1.81		
Camille Mercier	Independent		1,357	6.60		
Total			20,567	100.00	18,672	100.00
Valid votes			20,567	98.60	18,672	94.52
Invalid votes			59	0.28	86	0.44
Blank votes			233	1.12	996	5.04
Total votes			20,859	100.00	19,754	100.00
Registered voters/turnout			81,793	25.50	81,786	24.15

=== 3rd constituency ===
Candidate	Party or alliance		First round		Second round	
Candidate	Party or alliance		Votes	%	Votes	%
Charlotte Minvielle	New Popular Front	The Ecologists	26,873	39.22	37,326	49.46
Vincent Caure	Ensemble	Renaissance	26,810	39.13	38,134	50.54
Sophie Charbonnet	National Rally		4,504	6.57		
Balthazar Roger	The Republicans		3,442	5.02		
Assamahou Lamarre	Miscellaneous centre	Independent	3,365	4.91		
Joel Heslaut	Miscellaneous centre	Independent	1,251	1.83		
Anthony Coutret	Reconquête		752	1.10		
Tanguy Pinomaa-Danzé	Volt		701	1.02		
Emmanuel Constantin	Ecologists	Independent	355	0.52		
Tim Craye	Miscellaneous right	Independent	236	0.34		
Yvan Bachaud	Independent		226	0.33		
Total			68,515	100.00	75,460	100.00
Valid votes			68,515	98.65	75,460	96.45
Invalid votes			112	0.16	71	0.09
Blank votes			829	1.19	2,707	3.46
Total votes			69,456	100.00	78,238	100.00
Registered voters/turnout			160,634	43.24	160,627	48.71

=== 4th constituency ===
Candidate	Party or alliance		First round		Second round	
Candidate	Party or alliance		Votes	%	Votes	%
Cécilia Gondard	New Popular Front	Socialist Party	27,898	37.45	36,127	49.76
Pieyre-Alexandre Anglade	Ensemble	Renaissance	26,410	35.46	36,476	50.24
Charlotte Beaufils	National Rally		6,736	9.04		
Geneviève Machicote	The Republicans		4,604	6.18		
Juliette de Causans	Miscellaneous centre	Ecologists	4,318	5.80		
Sacha Courtial	Volt		1,563	2.10		
Patrick Brisset	Miscellaneous centre	Independent	1,492	2.00		
Anne-Catherine Girard	Reconquête		1,001	1.34		
Aude Rossolini	Independent		463	0.62		
Total			74,485	100.00	72,603	100.00
Valid votes			74,485	98.92	72,603	95.07
Invalid votes			99	0.13	153	0.20
Blank votes			713	0.95	3,609	4.73
Total votes			75,297	100.00	76,365	100.00
Registered voters/turnout			158,039	47.64	158,035	48.32

=== 5th constituency ===
Candidate	Party or alliance		First round		Second round	
Candidate	Party or alliance		Votes	%	Votes	%
Stéphane Vojetta	Ensemble	Miscellaneous centre	14,492	33.68	25,894	61.47
Maxime Da Silva	New Popular Front	La France Insoumise	11,267	26.18	16,230	38.53
Johana Maurel	National Rally		8,385	19.49		
José Sanchez Perez	Miscellaneous centre		2,226	5.17		
Jeremie Fosse	Miscellaneous left	Independent	2,161	5.02		
Yohann Castro	Miscellaneous right	Independent	2,069	4.81		
Béatrice Mazel	Reconquête		794	1.85		
Sarah Millot	Miscellaneous left	Independent	587	1.36		
Alexandre Marie	Volt		353	0.82		
Jean-François Calvet	Sovereigntist right	Independent	308	0.72		
Maud Lagarde	Independent		187	0.43		
Christopher Brenier	Independent		132	0.31		
David Nataf	Independent		70	0.16		
Total			43,031	100.00	42,124	100.00
Valid votes			43,031	98.49	42,124	93.19
Invalid votes			70	0.16	123	0.27
Blank votes			591	1.35	2,957	6.54
Total votes			43,692	100.00	45,204	100.00
Registered voters/turnout			115,502	37.83	115,497	39.14

=== 6th constituency ===
Candidate	Party or alliance		First round		Second round	
Candidate	Party or alliance		Votes	%	Votes	%
Marc Ferracci	Ensemble	Renaissance	25,590	40.54	34,771	59.48
Halima Delimi	New Popular Front	Socialist Party	19,446	30.81	23,687	40.52
Déborah Merceron	National Rally		9,158	14.51		
Olivier Corticchiato	The Republicans		4,172	6.61		
Jacques de Causans	Miscellaneous centre	Independent	1,888	2.99		
Philippe Tissot	Reconquête		949	1.50		
Marie-Julie Jacquemot	Volt		651	1.03		
Arnaud Dorthe	Independent		627	0.99		
Céline Von Auw	Ecologists	Independent	419	0.66		
Alexandre Marie	Radical Party of the Left (Note: Dissident who ran without the support of the New Popular Front)		222	0.35		
Total			63,122	100.00	58,458	100.00
Valid votes			63,122	98.94	58,458	92.36
Invalid votes			88	0.14	99	0.16
Blank votes			588	0.92	4,740	7.49
Total votes			63,798	100.00	63,297	100.00
Registered voters/turnout			159,746	39.94	159,733	39.63

=== 7th constituency ===
Candidate	Party or alliance		First round		Second round	
Candidate	Party or alliance		Votes	%	Votes	%
Frédéric Petit	Ensemble	Democratic Movement	21,929	37.78	34,516	58.21
Asma Rharmaoui-Claquin	New Popular Front	La France Insoumise	18,914	32.58	24,784	41.79
Mathilde Naveys-Dumas	National Rally		4,520	7.79		
Isabelle Huquet	Miscellaneous centre	Independent	3,861	6.65		
Cécile Richard	Volt		3,211	5.53		
Dominique Mier-Garrigou	The Republicans		2,702	4.65		
Jérôme Chambon	Independent		1,948	3.36		
Julie Alexandre	Reconquête		720	1.24		
Fanny Geffray	Independent		245	0.42		
Total			58,050	100.00	59,300	100.00
Valid votes			58,050	99.13	59,300	95.82
Invalid votes			81	0.14	119	0.19
Blank votes			428	0.73	2,466	3.98
Total votes			58,559	100.00	61,885	100.00
Registered voters/turnout			130,824	44.76	130,815	47.31

=== 8th constituency ===
Candidate	Party or alliance		First round		Second round	
Candidate	Party or alliance		Votes	%	Votes	%
Meyer Habib	The Republicans		11,557	35.58	16,428	47.30
Caroline Yadan	Ensemble	Renaissance	7,855	24.18	18,302	52.70
Yaël Lerer	New Popular Front	La France Insoumise	7,516	23.14		
Guillaume Bensoussan	Reconquête		2,044	6.29		
Aurelie Assouline	The Republicans		1,329	4.09		
Gilles Neffati	Miscellaneous centre	Independent	1,025	3.16		
Valérie Chartrain	Volt		457	1.41		
Nicolas Spitalas	Independent		299	0.92		
Philippe Hababou Solomon	Miscellaneous right	Independent	197	0.61		
David Bizet	Independent		188	0.58		
Benjamin Sigoura	Independent		15	0.05		
Total			32,482	100.00	34,730	100.00
Valid votes			32,482	98.22	34,730	95.88
Invalid votes			85	0.26	61	0.17
Blank votes			503	1.52	1,431	3.95
Total votes			33,070	100.00	36,222	100.00
Registered voters/turnout			148,957	22.20	148,948	24.32

=== 9th constituency ===
Candidate	Party or alliance		First round		Second round	
Candidate	Party or alliance		Votes	%	Votes	%
Karim Ben Cheïkh	New Popular Front	Génération.s	18,505	51.57	26,271	74.71
Samira Djouadi	Ensemble	Renaissance	5,634	15.70	8,893	25.29
Elodie Charron	National Rally		3,817	10.64		
Ismaël Boudjekada	Miscellaneous left	Independent	1,421	3.96		
Jihad Badreddine	The Republicans		1,242	3.46		
Erwan Borhan Davoux	Miscellaneous right	Independent	1,222	3.41		
Seddik Khalfi	Miscellaneous left	Independent	1,171	3.26		
Rachid Tahiri	Miscellaneous centre	Independent	1,102	3.07		
Régina Ducellier	Miscellaneous centre	Independent	693	1.93		
Pierre Drevon	Reconquête		311	0.87		
Hassan Oudrhiri	Independent		236	0.66		
Sébastien Périmony	Independent		172	0.48		
Kourtoum Sackho	Miscellaneous right	Miscellaneous centre	117	0.33		
Gabriel Marie Sidibé	Independent		84	0.23		
Rania Tessa Maachou	Independent		61	0.17		
Hachim Fadili	Sovereigntist right	Debout la France	53	0.15		
Edouard Tinaugus	Miscellaneous left	Independent	20	0.06		
Khadija David	Miscellaneous left	Independent	11	0.03		
Abdoulai Dianifaba	Independent		8	0.02		
Total			35,880	100.00	35,164	100.00
Valid votes			35,880	98.02	35,164	94.47
Invalid votes			131	0.36	168	0.45
Blank votes			592	1.62	1,890	5.08
Total votes			36,603	100.00	37,222	100.00
Registered voters/turnout			130,387	28.07	130,380	28.55

=== 10th constituency ===
Candidate	Party or alliance		First round		Second round	
Candidate	Party or alliance		Votes	%	Votes	%
Elsa Di Meo	New Popular Front	Socialist Party	11,651	32.52	14,986	46.77
Amélia Lakrafi	Ensemble	Renaissance	11,398	31.82	17,055	53.23
Jean de Veron	Union of the far right	The Republicans	6,147	17.16		
Lucas Lamah	The Republicans		3,488	9.74		
Marie Josée Mabasi	Miscellaneous centre	Independent	948	2.65		
Philippe Castellan	Reconquête		842	2.35		
Ali Camille Hojeij	Miscellaneous centre	Independent	709	1.98		
Odile Mojon-Cheminade	Independent		450	1.26		
Sandra Larose	Independent		94	0.26		
Julie Lagui	Independent		70	0.20		
Hugues Michel Marie-Louise	Independent		20	0.06		
Nathalie Mazot	Miscellaneous left	Independent	7	0.02		
Total			35,824	100.00	32,041	100.00
Valid votes			35,824	98.14	32,041	92.69
Invalid votes			115	0.32	200	0.58
Blank votes			563	1.54	2,328	6.73
Total votes			36,502	100.00	34,569	100.00
Registered voters/turnout			113,855	32.06	113,835	30.37

=== 11th constituency ===
Candidate	Party or alliance		First round		Second round	
Candidate	Party or alliance		Votes	%	Votes	%
Anne Genetet	Ensemble	Renaissance	16,770	39.94	21,468	57.04
Franck Pajot	New Popular Front	Socialist Party	12,502	29.78	16,172	42.96
Pierre Brochet	National Rally		6,424	15.30		
Marc Guyon	Far-right	Independent	1,495	3.56		
François Asselineau	Sovereigntist right	Independent	1,376	3.28		
Tatiana Boteva-Malo	Ecologists	Independent	949	2.26		
Anne-France Larquemin	Reconquête		719	1.71		
Jordan Cruciani	Ecologists	Independent	574	1.37		
Françoise Arthur	Regionalists	Independent	507	1.21		
Elise Phonrath	Sovereigntist right	Independent	244	0.58		
Jacques Cheminade	Independent		224	0.53		
Nelly Violette	Independent		148	0.35		
Victor Maurel	Independent		30	0.07		
Nathalie Martin	Miscellaneous left	Independent	14	0.03		
Olivier Machet	Independent		10	0.02		
Total			41,986	100.00	37,640	100.00
Valid votes			41,986	98.34	37,640	91.34
Invalid votes			91	0.21	233	0.57
Blank votes			618	1.45	3,334	8.09
Total votes			42,695	100.00	41,207	100.00
Registered voters/turnout			104,619	40.81	104,601	39.39
