= Alexandre Holroyd =

French politician (born 1987)

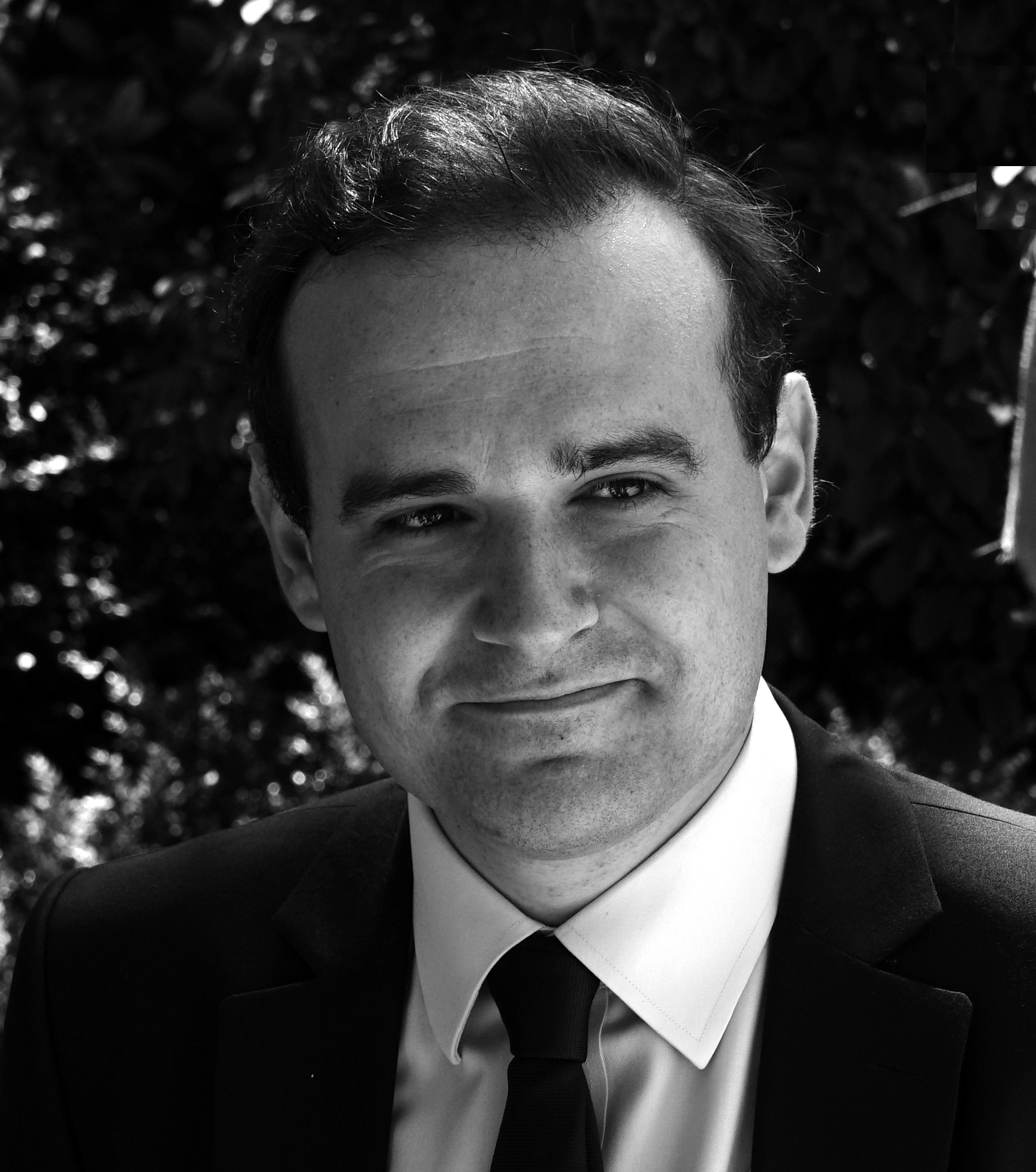
- Holroyd in 2017

Member of the National Assembly for the 3rd constituency for French residents overseas
- In office 21 June 2017 – 9 June 2024
- Preceded by: Axelle Lemaire
- Succeeded by: Vincent Caure

Personal details
- Born: 17 May 1987 (age 39) Basel, Switzerland
- Party: Renaissance (2016–present)
- Education: Lycée Français Charles de Gaulle
- Alma mater: King's College London (BA); Sciences Po (MA); London School of Economics (MA)
- Occupation: Politician
- Website: National Assembly page

Alexandre Holroyd (French pronunciation: [alɛksɑ̃dʁ ɔlʁɔid]; born 17 May 1987) is a French politician who also holds British citizenship. He was elected to the National Assembly for La République En Marche! (later Renaissance) in the 2017 legislative election in the third constituency for French residents overseas, which comprises the British Isles, the Nordic states, and the Baltic states. He won in the second round against Socialist candidate Axelle Lemaire, whom he succeeded in office. He won reelection in 2022 before standing down in 2024.

== Early life and education ==
Born in Switzerland, Holroyd holds French and British citizenship. He was educated at the Lycée Français Charles de Gaulle, a school in South Kensington in London, followed by King's College London, the London School of Economics and Sciences Po (also known in English as the Paris Institute of Political Studies).

Upon graduation, Holroyd worked with FTI Consulting in Brussels and later London.

== Political career ==
Holroyd left his job to found the En Marche (later La République En Marche!) movement branch in London, a few weeks after the British vote on Brexit. Since 21 June 2017, Holroyd has served as a deputy in the National Assembly, representing Northern Europe.

From 2017 until 2020, Holroyd served on the Finance Committee of the National Assembly. Since 2020, he has been a member of the Committee on Foreign Affairs and the Committee on European Affairs. In this capacity, he was the parliament's rapporteur on the consequences of Brexit.

In addition to his committee assignments, he is part of the French Parliamentary Friendship Group with the United Kingdom. Since 2019, he has also been a member of the French delegation to the Franco-German Parliamentary Assembly.

In the 2022 legislative election, he won reelection to a second five-year term.

== Other activities ==
- Caisse des dépôts et consignations, Chair of the Supervisory Board (since 2022)

== Political positions ==
In July 2019, Holroyd voted in favour of the French ratification of the European Union's Comprehensive Economic and Trade Agreement (CETA) with Canada.
