= Eighth French legislative constituency for citizens abroad =

Constituency of the French Fifth Republic

8th constituency for French residents overseas
- inline Constituency of the National Assembly of France

- Deputy: Caroline Yadan; RE
- Department: none (overseas residents)
- Cantons: none
- Registered voters: 148,948

The Eighth French legislative constituency for citizens abroad (huitième circonscription des Français établis hors de France) is one of eleven constituencies each electing one representative of French people living outside France to the French National Assembly.

This constituency elected its first ever representative at the 2012 French legislative election.

== Area ==
It covers all French citizens living in the following seven countries in Southern Europe: Cyprus, Greece, the Holy See (Vatican), Italy, Malta, San Marino and Turkey and two countries in Middle East: Israel and Palestine. As of New Year's Day 2011, it contained 144,505 registered French citizens - of which 78,748 in Israel and Palestine, 46,554 in Italy, and just 17 in the Holy See.

Although France did not recognise the State of Palestine until 2025, French residents in Gaza and the West Bank were nonetheless entitled to vote, but they were counted as residents of Israel at the time. There were 229 registered French citizens in Gaza or the West Bank at the creation of the constituency, and a polling station was opened in Ramallah.

== Deputies ==
Election	Member	Party
2012	Daphna Poznanski-Benhamou	PS
2013 by-election	Meyer Habib	UDI
2017	Meyer Habib	UDI
2022	Meyer Habib	UDI
2023	Meyer Habib	LR-UDI
2024	Caroline Yadan	RE

== Election results ==
=== 2024 ===
Candidate	Party	Alliance	First round		Second round	
Candidate	Party	Alliance	Votes	%	Votes	%
Meyer Habib	LR	UDC	11,557	35.58	16,428	47.30
Caroline Yadan	RE	Ensemble	7,855	24.18	18,302	52.70
Yaël Lerer	LFI	NFP	7,516	23.14		
Guillaume Bensoussan	REC		2,044	6.29		
Aurelie Assouline	LR diss.		1,329	4.09		
Gilles Neffati	DVC		1,025	3.16		
Valérie Chartrain	Volt		457	1.41		
Nicolas Spitalas	DIV		299	0.92		
Philippe Hababou Solomon	DVD		197	0.61		
David Bizet	DIV		188	0.58		
Benjamin Sigoura	DIV		15	0.05		
Valid votes			32,482	100.00	36,222	100.00
Blank votes			503	1.52	1,431	3.95
Null votes			85	0.26	61	0.17
Turnout			33,070	22.20	36,222	24.32
Abstentions			115,887	77.80	112,726	75.68
Registered voters			148,957		148,948	
Result			RE GAIN FROM LR			

=== 2023 by-election ===
The 2022 election was annulled by the Constitutional Council, with the first round of the by-election taking place on 2 April and the second round scheduled for 16 April.

2023 by-election: 8th constituency for French citizens overseas
Party	Candidate	Votes	%	±%
UDI (UDC)	Meyer Habib	5,835	38.35	+9.50
RE (Ensemble)	Deborah Abisror-de Lieme	3,850	24.67	-3.11
DVG (NUPÉS)	Yael Lerer	2,445	15.67	−2.17
DVE	Juliette de Causans	1,095	7.37	+2.37
GRS (FGR)	Hélène Lehmann	973	6.23	+3.26
REC	Serge Siksik	924	5.92	−0.99
Others	N/A	280	1.79	−
Turnout		15,977	11.55	−0.68
2nd round result
UDI (UDC)	Meyer Habib	8,075	53.99	+3.41
RE (Ensemble)	Deborah Abisror-de Lieme	6,882	46.01	−3.41
Turnout				
UDI hold				

=== 2022 ===
Legislative Election 2022: 8th constituency for French citizens overseas
Party	Candidate	Votes	%	±%
UDI (UDC)	Meyer Habib	4,572	28.85	-6.66
LREM (Ensemble)	Deborah Abisror-de Lieme	4,402	27.78	-8.95
LFI (NUPÉS)	Isabelle Rivolet	2,986	18.84	+3.56
REC	Serge Siksik	1,095	6.91	N/A
DIV	Milad Ezabadir	793	5.00	N/A
Volt	Léa Agathe Hetz	559	3.53	N/A
GRS (FGR)	Hélène Lehmann	470	2.97	N/A
Others	N/A	970	6.11	−
Turnout		15,847	12.23	+2.92
2nd round result
UDI (UDC)	Meyer Habib	8,470	50.58	-7.28
LREM (Ensemble)	Deborah Abisror-de Lieme	8,277	49.42	+7.28
Turnout		16,747	13.93	+2.54
UDI hold				

=== 2017 ===
Candidate	Label	First round		Second round	
Candidate	Label	Votes	%	Votes	%
Florence Drory	REM	4,150	36.73	5,825	42.14
Meyer Habib	UDI	4,013	35.51	7,998	57.86
Hélène Panoussis	FI	834	7.38		
Daphna Poznanski-Benhamou	DIV	667	5.90		
Nil Delahaye	ECO	563	4.98		
Nathalie Jorge Laick	FN	316	2.80		
Benjamin Djiane	PS	241	2.13		
Raphaël Destremau	DVD	139	1.23		
Anne Sabourin	PCF	89	0.79		
David Acunzo	DIV	87	0.77		
Jean-Yves Metayer-Robbes	ECO	50	0.44		
Barbara Pascarel	DIV	45	0.40		
Christophe Cesetti	DIV	38	0.34		
Mathilde Cameirao	DIV	27	0.24		
Jacques Neno	DIV	21	0.19		
Frédéric Chaouat	DIV	12	0.11		
Denis Bensimon	DVD	8	0.07		
Votes		11,300	100.00	13,823	100.00
Valid votes		11,300	99.01	13,823	97.34
Blank votes		41	0.36	288	2.03
Null votes		72	0.63	90	0.63
Turnout		11,413	9.40	14,201	11.70
Abstentions		109,986	90.60	107,185	88.30
Registered voters		121,399		121,386	
Source: Ministry of the Interior

=== 2013 by-election ===
The first round of the by-election was held on 26 May, and the second round was held on 9 June. Citizens wishing to cast their ballot over the Internet for the first round were able to do so from 15 to 21 May.

==== Candidates ====
There were twenty candidates:

- Marie-Rose Koro, a resident of Turkey, for the Socialist Party
- Valérie Hoffenberg once more for the UMP
- Michèle Parravicini once more for the Left Front
- Athanase Contargyris, a Franco-Greek businessman living in Athens, for Europe Écologie-The Greens
- Meyer Habib, the deputy leader of the Representative Council of French Jewish Institutions, for the centre-right Union of Democrats and Independents
- Alix Guillard for the Pirate Party
- Jonathan-Simon Sellem for the classical liberal Liberal Democratic Party; a resident of Israel, he expressed the intention of defending Israeli interests in the French Parliament
- Julien Lemaitre once more for Solidarity and Progress
- Twelve independent candidates. Among them, Alexandre Bezardin, a dissident from the UMP. He had been Hoffenberg's suppléant the previous year, but now stood against her.

==== Results ====
Turnout in the first round was very low: 10.37%, with a "high" point of 14.56% in Greece and a low point of 7.03% in Israel. In a notable departure from the result of the previous year, the Socialist candidate was eliminated in the first round, leaving the UMP and UDI candidates to advance to the run-off. UMP dissident Alexandre Bezardin, standing as an independent, finished fourth, mostly attracting votes in Italy (where he came third, well ahead of Habib).

2013 by-election: Overseas residents 8 - 1st round
Party	Candidate	Votes	%	±%
UMP	Valérie Hoffenberg	2,479	21.84	−0.36
UDI	Meyer Habib	1,744	15.36	n/a
PS	Marie-Rose Koro	1,659	14.61	−15.89
DVD	Alexandre Bezardin	884	7.78	n/a
FG	Michèle Parravicini	807	7.10	+0.78
PLD	Jonathan Sellem	755	6.64	n/a
EELV	Athanase Contargyris	666	5.86	−4.64
Independent	Nathalie Mimoun	589	5.18	n/a
Independent	David Shapira	479	4.22	n/a
Independent	Albert Fratty	383	3.37	n/a
EXD	Huguette Levy	203	1.79	−1.97
Independent	Laurent Sissmann	141	1.24	n/a
Independent	Sylvain Semhoun	127	1.12	n/a
PP	Alix Guillard	111	0.98	n/a
Independent	Cyril Castro	94	0.83	n/a
Independent	Valérie Mira	89	0.78	n/a
Independent	Ghislain Allon	48	0.42	n/a
SP	Julien Lemaître	41	0.36	−0.74
Independent	Frédéric Chaouat	34	0.30	n/a
Independent	Guy Fitoussi	15	0.13	−0.37
Turnout		11,586	10.37	−3.00

2013 by-election: Overseas residents 8 - 2nd round
Party	Candidate	Votes	%	±%
UDI	Meyer Habib	4,767	53.36	−
UMP	Valérie Hoffenberg	4,166	46.64	−
Turnout		8,933	9.10	−
UDI gain from PS				

=== 2012 ===
==== Candidates ====
The list of candidates was officially finalised on 14 May. There were ten candidates:

The Union for a Popular Movement chose Valérie Hoffenberg, a former president of the American Jewish Committee in France, as its candidate. Alexandre Bezardin was her deputy (suppléant).

The Socialist Party chose Daphna Poznanski-Benhamou, a legal consultant and resident of Tel Aviv. Her deputy (suppléant) was Philippe Hébrard, a resident of Rome.

The Left Front chose Michèle Parravicini, a teacher of Italian origin. A resident of Greece, she had also lived in Italy and lived and worked in Turkey. Her deputy (suppléant) was Guillaume Mariel.

Europe Écologie–The Greens chose Pierre Jestin, a resident of Milan, with Mélanie Lacide as his deputy (suppléante).

The National Front did not present a candidate of its own, but endorsed Huguette Livernault-Lévy, of the small, new far-right party Sovereignty, Independence and Freedoms, which was allied to the National Front as part of the "Marine blue gathering" (rassemblement bleu Marine). Florian Dufait was her deputy.

The Radical Party of the Left chose Corinne Rouffi. Of dual French and Israeli citizenship, she pledged to support the interests of French residents "on both sides of the wall", in Israel and Palestine. She also promised to support the accession of Turkey to the European Union, "with the recognition of the Kurdish people and their autonomous status". Adnan Kaya was her deputy.

Solidarity and Progress, the French branch of the LaRouche movement, was represented by Julien Lemaître, with Éric Sauze as her deputy.

Philippe Karsenty was a candidate of the miscellaneous right, endorsed by the Liberal Democratic Party and the Christian Democratic Party, although he was a member of neither. Éric Veron was his deputy.

Gil Taïeb, who defined himself as a "militant Zionist", stood as an "independent humanist centrist", focusing solely on the French community in Israel. Avi Zana was his deputy.

Guy Fitoussi was an independent candidate, with Arié Bengenou as his deputy.

==== Results ====
As in other constituencies, turnout in the first round was low. It was at its lowest in Israel (7.6%), and highest in Turkey (just 24%). Socialist candidate Daphna Poznanski-Benhamou finished first, ahead of a divided right with strong dissident candidates. Pierre Jestin also obtained a good result for the Greens (10.5% overall; 15.9% in Italy). Poznanski-Benhamou finished first in every country, except in Israel, where independent candidates Philippe Karsenty and Gil Taïeb came first and second respectively, and in Malta where she came second to Valérie Hoffenberg (UMP) by just five votes.

The results in Israel (with an extremely low turnout) were notably different from the rest of the constituency. Gil Taïeb was standing as an independent right-wing candidate with an exclusive focus on Israel, promising to defend its interests along right-wing lines, while Philippe Karsenty, also an independent right-wing candidate, was already known for his campaign to support Israel's image abroad. Karsenty finished first in Israel with 30.40% of the vote, while Taïeb obtained 26.36%, and Poznanski-Benhamou 19.66%. Hoffenberg was relegated to fourth place with 19.26%. In Italy, however, Karsenty finished fifth, and obtained fairly few votes in other countries. Taïeb, finishing eighth in Italy, obtained only a handful of votes outside Israel. (In Turkey, Taïeb obtained only 10 votes (1.00%), just 3 votes in Cyprus (1.46%), and just 1 vote in Malta (1.14%).)

Legislative Election 2012: Overseas residents 8 - 2nd round
Party	Candidate	Votes	%	±%
PS	Daphna Poznanski-Benhamou	7,584	55.88	−
UMP	Valérie Hoffenberg	5,987	44.12	−
Turnout		13,965	12.77%	−
Void election result		Swing	n/a	

Legislative Election 2012: Overseas residents 8 - 1st round
Party	Candidate	Votes	%	±%
PS	Daphna Poznanski-Benhamou	4400	30.50	−
UMP	Valérie Hoffenberg	3202	22.20	−
DVD	Philippe Karsenty	2084	14.45	−
EELV	Pierre Jestin	1515	10.50	−
Independent	Gil Taïeb	1431	9.92	−
FG	Michèle Parravicini	911	6.32	−
Sovereignty, Independence and Freedoms	Huguette Livernault-Lévy	542	3.76	−
SP	Julien Lemaître	159	1.10	−
PRG	Corinne Rouffi	108	0.75	−
Independent	Guy Fitoussi	72	0.50	−
Turnout		14626	13.37	n/a

==== Subsequent annulment ====
In February 2013, the election of Daphna Poznanski-Benhamou was annulled by the Constitutional Council, due to irregularities in the funding of her electoral campaign. She was barred from standing for public office for a period of one year. Defeated candidates Gil Taïeb and Philippe Karsenty were also barred from standing for public office for a year, for the same reason.
