= Christophe Premat =

French politician (born 1976)

French Deputy for Northern Europe
- In office 10 May 2014 – 27 March 2017
- President: François Hollande
- Prime Minister: Manuel Valls; Bernard Cazeneuve
- Preceded by: Axelle Lemaire
- Succeeded by: Axelle Lemaire

Personal details
- Born: 7 December 1976 (age 49) Annecy, Haute-Savoie
- Party: Parti socialiste (PS)
- Spouse: Ilse née Jacob
- Children: 3
- Education: Sciences Po, ENS Fontenay-Saint-Cloud
- Occupation: Politist, MP (2014-2017)
- Profession: Academic
- Website: https://christophepremat.wordpress.com

Heraldic badge of the French Republic

Christophe Premat (born 7 December 1976) is a French academic and politician who served as deputy for the Third constituency for French residents overseas in the Assemblée Nationale at Paris, from 2014 to 2017.

A member of the French Socialist Party (Parti socialiste), Premat took over the parliamentary constituency of northern Europe from Axelle Lemaire as her substitute when she became a government minister in May 2014.

== Publications (selected) ==
- After the Deluge: New Perspectives on the Intellectual and Cultural History of Postwar France (After the Empire: The Francophone World and Post-colonial France) (contributor), Lexington Books, 2004
- Dictionnaire des relations franco-allemandes, with Isabelle Guinaudeau and Astrid Kufer, 2009
- Le traitement de l'actualité en classe de français langue étrangère : résultats concrets d'une recherche-action menée auprès de deux publics d'apprenants au profil contrasté, VDM Publishing, 2010
- Destins d’exilés. Trois philosophes grecs à Paris : Kostas Axelos, Cornelius Castoriadis, Kostas Papaïoannou, with Servanne Jollivet and Mats Rosengren, 2011.

== Honours ==
- Chevalier, Ordre des Palmes Académiques (2014).
