= Seventh French legislative constituency for citizens abroad =

Constituency for French residents overseas

7th constituency for French residents overseas
- inline Constituency of the National Assembly of France

- Deputy: Frédéric Petit; MoDem
- Department: none (overseas residents)
- Cantons: none
- Registered voters: 130,815

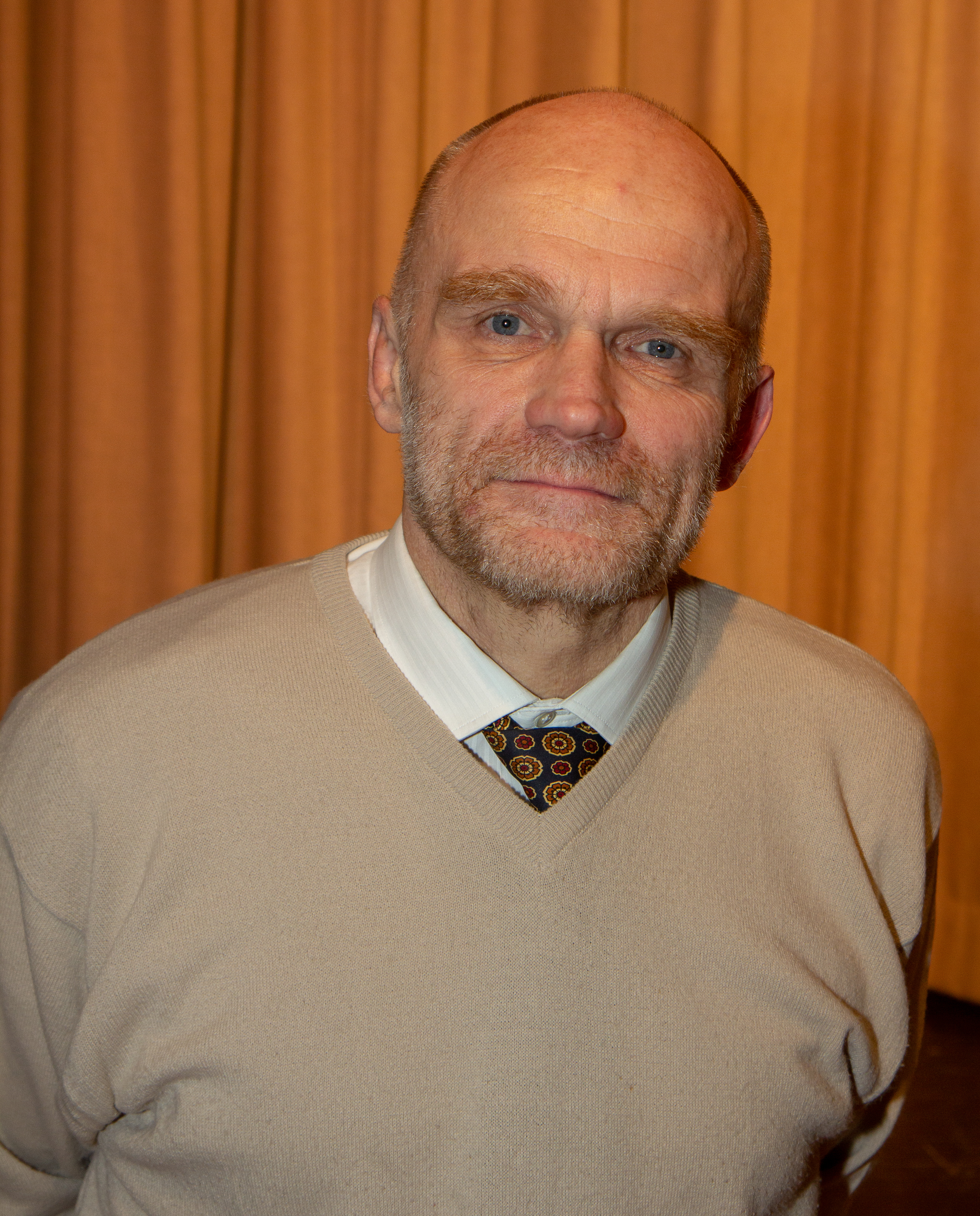
Frédéric Petit, 2019

The Seventh French legislative constituency for citizens abroad (septième circonscription des Français établis hors de France) is one of eleven constituencies each electing one representative of French people living outside France to the French National Assembly.

== Area ==
It covers all French citizens living in two countries in Western Europe (Germany and Austria) and fourteen countries in Eastern Europe – specifically, Albania, Bosnia and Herzegovina, Bulgaria, Croatia, the Czech Republic, Hungary, Kosovo (recognised by France), Macedonia, Montenegro, Poland, Romania, Serbia, Slovenia, and Slovakia. As of New Year's Day 2011, it contained 138,329 registered French voters. By far the greatest number of these (111,742) were living in Germany. (In contrast, there were only 121 in Albania.)

This constituency elected its first ever representative at the 2012 French legislative election.

== Deputies ==
Election	Member	Party
2012	Pierre-Yves Le Borgn'	PS
2017	Frédéric Petit	MoDem
2022	Frédéric Petit	MoDem
2024	Frédéric Petit	MoDem

== Election results ==
=== 2024 ===
Candidate	Party	Alliance	First round		Second round	
Candidate	Party	Alliance	Votes	%	Votes	%
Frédéric Petit	MoDem	Ensemble	21,929	37.78	34,516	58.21
Asma Rharmaoui-Claquin	LFI	NFP	18,914	32.58	24,784	41.79
Mathilde Naveys--Dumas	RN		4,520	7.79		
Isabelle Huquet	DVC		3,861	6.65		
Cécile Richard	Volt		3,211	5.53		
Dominique Mier-Garrigou	LR	UDC	2,702	4.65		
Jérôme Chambon	DIV		1,948	3.36		
Julie Alexandre	REC		720	1.24		
Fanny Geffray	DIV		245	0.42		
Valid votes			58,050	100.00	59,300	100.00
Blank votes			428	0.73	2,466	3.98
Null votes			81	0.14	119	0.19
Turnout			58,559	44.76	61,885	47.31
Abstentions			72,265	55.24	68,930	52.69
Registered voters			130,824		130,815	
Result			MoDem HOLD			

=== 2022 ===
Legislative Election 2022: 7th constituency for French citizens overseas
Party	Candidate	Votes	%	±%
MoDem (Ensemble)	Frédéric Petit	12,409	34.58	-19.45
LFI (NUPÉS)	Asma Rharmaoui-Claquin	9,353	26.06	-5.52
DVE	Tania Botéva-Malo	2,582	7.19	N/A
DVC	Bernard Geiter	2,043	5.69	N/A
Volt	Valérie Chartrain	1,783	4.97	N/A
DVD	Vassili Le Moigne	1,453	4.05	N/A
LR (UDC)	Philippe Deswel	1,391	3.88	−5.28
REC	Sophie Loobuyck	1,333	3.71	N/A
DVE	Thierry Deneuve	1,021	2.84	N/A
Others	N/A	2,520	7.03	−
Turnout		35,888	29.34	+3.90
2nd round result
MoDem (Ensemble)	Frédéric Petit	23,191	60.21	-2.73
LFI (NUPÉS)	Asma Rharmaoui-Claquin	15,328	39.79	+2.73
Turnout		38,519	32.35	+10.22
MoDem hold				

=== 2017 ===
Candidate	Label	First round		Second round	
Candidate	Label	Votes	%	Votes	%
Frédéric Petit	MoDem	14,359	54.03	14,115	62.94
Pierre-Yves Le Borgn'	PS	3,689	13.88	8,310	37.06
Anna Deparnay-Grunenberg	ECO	2,644	9.95		
Philippe Gustin	LR	2,169	8.16		
François-Jérôme Lallemand	FI	1,912	7.20		
Jean-Pierre Hottinger	FN	528	1.99		
Benoît Mayrand	UDI	265	1.00		
Pierre Rommevaux	DIV	190	0.71		
Laurence Thierry	DIV	178	0.67		
Maëva Durand	PCF	145	0.55		
Mélanie Legrand	DIV	137	0.52		
Ludovic Lemoues	EXD	128	0.48		
Bruno Scrive	DVD	121	0.46		
Delphine Lyon	DIV	105	0.40		
Marie-Claire Sébastien	DVD	4	0.02		
Votes		26,574	100.00	22,425	100.00
Valid votes		26,574	98.58	22,425	95.64
Blank votes		50	0.19	774	3.30
Null votes		332	1.23	248	1.06
Turnout		26,956	25.44	23,447	22.13
Abstentions		78,999	74.56	82,499	77.87
Registered voters		105,955		105,946	
Source: Ministry of the Interior

=== 2012 ===
==== Candidates ====
The list of candidates was officially finalised on 14 May. There were fifteen candidates:

The Socialist Party chose Pierre-Yves Le Borgn', whose work in the field of solar energy was based in Brussels, but who also worked in Germany, as its candidate. His deputy (suppléante) was Pascale Seux, a resident of Warsaw. Le Borgn' was also endorsed by Europe Écologie–The Greens. (Europe Écologie–The Greens initially chose Pierrette Stephan-Letondor, with Florian Chiron as her deputy (suppléant). A resident of Baden-Württemberg, Stephan-Letondor was a radio-journalist for Südwestrundfunk, and a member of the German party Alliance '90/The Greens. The party subsequently withdrew its candidate, however, as part of an agreement whereby Europe Écologie–The Greens and the Socialist Party endorsed each other's candidate in several constituencies.)

The Union for a Popular Movement chose Ronan Le Gleut. Living in Berlin where he was born in 1976, he served as patent examiner at the European Patent Organisation. Martine Schöppner was his deputy (suppléante).

Éric Bourguignon, of the French Communist Party, was the chosen candidate of the Left Front. His deputy (suppléant) was Michel Cullin.

The Democratic Movement chose Xavier Fourny, with Mathieu Baudier as his deputy.

The National Front did not present a candidate of its own, but endorsed Agnès Dejouy, of the small, new far-right party Sovereignty, Independence and Freedoms, which is allied to the National Front as part of the "Marine blue gathering" (rassemblement bleu Marine). Matthieu Petit is her deputy.

The centre-right Radical Party and the centrist Republican, Ecologist and Social Alliance jointly chose Nicolas Jeanneté, a "cultural entrepreneur" and resident of Germany, as their candidate. Elisabeth Duda was his deputy.

The centre-left Radical Party of the Left chose Sylvie Olympe-Moreau. Her deputy was Jean-Marie Langlet

The centrist green party Cap 21 chose Bruno Pludermacher, a resident of Munich. He was a freelance engineering consultant. His deputy was Odette Barbosa de Lima.

Solidarity and Progress, the French branch of the LaRouche movement, was represented by Elodie Viennot, with Théo Genot as her deputy.

The Liberal Democratic Party chose Denis Matton. He was also endorsed by the Christian Democratic Party. Joël Bros was his deputy.

The Pirate Party chose Isabelle Robin, a teacher, who lived partly in Brittany and partly near Wiesbaden, in Germany. Pointing out that the party had no funds, she campaignrf entirely online, through social media. Julien Hue was her deputy.

Jean-Claude Wambre, a commercial agent established in Nieder-Olm near Mainz, ran as an independent candidate. His deputy was Hervé Messmer.

Jacques Régnier, who had "lived and worked more than half his life" abroad, primarily in Germany, stood as an independent candidate, arguing that expatriates have specific needs best served by an independent. Frédéric Halfort was his deputy.

Hyacinthe Muller, a student of economics and music who had been living almost all his life in Germany, stood as an independent candidate, with Raphaëlle Deliancourt as his deputy.

Jacques Werckmann was an independent candidate, with Clément Renaudet as his deputy.

==== Results ====
As in other constituencies, turnout in the first round was low, with a low point of 14.8% in Serbia. Only in Albania did more than half of all registered French citizens vote (59.5%). In Slovakia, turnout was 42.3%; elsewhere, it was below 40%. Socialist candidate Pierre-Yves Le Borgn' finished first by a large margin. He was first in every country except Bulgaria, Kosovo (where he received 3 votes to Ronan Le Gleut's 5), Montenegro (7 votes to Le Gleut's 8), Poland, Romania and Slovakia.

Legislative Election 2012: Overseas residents 7 – 2nd round
Party	Candidate	Votes	%	±%
PS	Pierre-Yves Le Borgn'	11,970	56.90	
UMP	Ronan Le Gleut	9,068	43.10	
Turnout		21, 072	23.67	
PS win (new seat)				

Legislative Election 2012: Overseas residents 7 – 1st round
Party	Candidate	Votes	%	±%
PS	Pierre-Yves Le Borgn'	8,359	40.08	
UMP	Ronan Le Gleut	5,957	28.56	
MoDem	Xavier Fourny	1,347	6.46	–
Radical	Nicolas Jeanneté	850	4.08	–
FG	Éric Bourguignon	809	3.88	–
Cap 21	Bruno Pludermacher	805	3.86	
SIEL	Agnès Dejouy	740	3.55	–
PP	Isabelle Robin	595	2.85	–
PLD	Denis Matton	354	1.70	–
Independent	Jacques Werckmann	351	1.68	–
Independent	Jean-Claude Wambre	195	0.93	–
PRG	Sylvie Olympe-Moreau	176	0.84	–
SP	Élodie Viennot	147	0.70	–
Independent	Jacques Régnier	141	0.68	–
Independent	Hyacinthe Muller	30	0.14	–
Turnout		21,072	23.7	–
