= Axelle Lemaire =

French politician

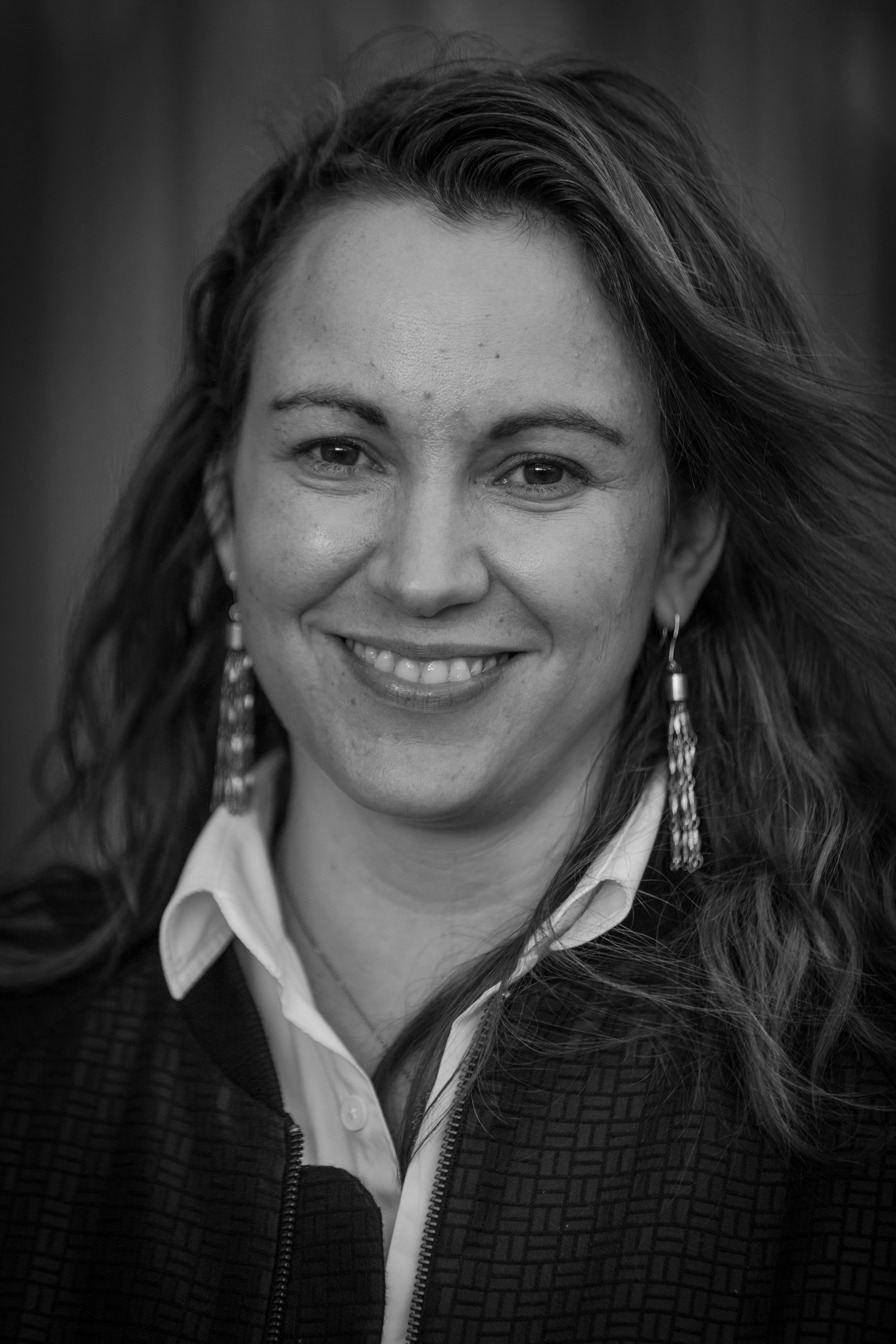
- Axelle Lemaire in 2015

Minister for Digital Affairs
- In office 9 April 2014 – 27 February 2017
- President: François Hollande
- Prime Minister: Manuel Valls; Bernard Cazeneuve
- Preceded by: Fleur Pellerin
- Succeeded by: Christophe Sirugue

Assembly Member for Northern Europe
- In office 20 June 2012 – 9 May 2014
- Preceded by: Position created
- Succeeded by: Christophe Premat
- In office 27 March 2017 – 20 June 2017
- Preceded by: Christophe Premat
- Succeeded by: Alexandre Holroyd

Personal details
- Born: 18 October 1974 (age 51) Ottawa, Ontario, Canada
- Party: Parti socialiste (PS)
- Children: 3
- Education: Institut d'études politiques de Paris; Panthéon-Assas University; King's College London
- Occupation: Politician
- Profession: Lawyer
- Website: Official Website

Axelle Lemaire (born 18 October 1974) is a French former Socialist politician who served as a Deputy for the Third constituency for French overseas residents in the National Assembly of the French Parliament, for which she was elected in 2012.

In May 2014, Prime Minister Manuel Valls appointed her to the French Finance Ministry as minister responsible for Digital Affairs.

In February 2017, she resigned from her ministry to run unsuccessfully for a second deputy mandate.

== Education and personal life ==
Lemaire was born in Ottawa, Ontario, to a French mother and a Quebecois father. After being brought up in Hull, Quebec, where she attended Collège Saint-Joseph de Hull, Lemaire lived as a teenager in Montpellier.

She studied Modern Literature and Political Science at the Sciences Po. She earned law degrees at the Panthéon-Assas University (DEA, 2000) and at King's College Dickson Poon School of Law (LLM, 2003). Lemaire subsequently taught legal studies at university level and worked in a law firm, before working at the British House of Commons as a researcher for the former Labour MP and Minister Denis MacShane.

Lemaire lived in London with her husband and two children from 2002 to 2014 before relocating to Paris.

== Political career ==
Lemaire served as Secretary of the French Socialist Party (PS) in London from 2008 until her election to the National Assembly in 2012. According to Le Point, she turned down a ministerial post in Jean-Marc Ayrault's second government because as a mother of two young children, she had no desire to leave London. She has served as Chair of the UK-France Parliamentary Friendship Group. She did, however, accept an appointment as Minister of State for Digital Affairs in Valls' new government in April 2014.

=== Member of the National Assembly ===
In 2012 Lemaire was returned as Deputy for one of the eleven newly created constituencies, each elected by French overseas citizens to the French National Assembly. The constituency she represented as inaugural Deputy includes all registered French citizens living in the ten countries throughout Northern Europe—Iceland, Norway, Denmark (including the Faroe Islands and Greenland), Sweden, Finland, Great Britain, and Northern Ireland, Ireland, Estonia, Latvia, and Lithuania. As of 2011, it recorded 140,731 French citizens on its electoral roll, with the vast majority (113,655) living in the United Kingdom, which has the third-largest French expat population in the world. Consequently, her election campaign received considerable attention at the time from the British press.

Having won 55% of the vote, during her term as Deputy she regularly appeared in the British media regarding French politics. In May 2014, upon assuming French governmental ministerial office, Lemaire resigned her parliamentary seat and was succeeded by Christophe Premat.

=== Secretary of State for Digital Affairs ===
Upon joining the Ministry for the Economy, Industry and Digital Affairs in Paris, Lemaire had been a leading proponent of net neutrality legislation.

She was involved in the French Tech movement, which unites French digital startups worldwide.

She resigned from the position in February 2017 to focus on the Socialist Party's candidate campaign for French presidential election. She then joined the campaign to retain her seat in the French Parliament but was severely defeated by Alexandre Holroyd of La République En Marche!

== Post-politics ==
In February 2018, Lemaire took a job with the consulting firm Roland Berger.
