= Third French legislative constituency for citizens abroad =

Constituency for French residents overseas

3rd constituency for French residents overseas
- inline Constituency of the National Assembly of France

- Deputy: Vincent Caure; RE
- Department: None (overseas residents)
- Cantons: None
- Registered voters: 160,627 (2024)

The third constituency for French residents overseas (French: Troisième circonscription des Français établis hors de France) is one of eleven constituencies representing French citizens living abroad. It was created by the 2010 redistricting of French legislative constituencies and elects, since 2012, one representative to the National Assembly.

It represents all French citizens living in British Isles (United Kingdom, Ireland and Crown Dependencies in Manx Island and Channel Islands), Northern Europe and Eastern Europe (Baltic States). As of 2024, it contained 175,997 registered French voters.

== Area ==
It covers all French citizens living in ten countries in Northern Europe – specifically, Iceland, Norway, Denmark (including the Faroe Islands and Greenland), Sweden, Finland (including Åland), Ireland, the United Kingdom, Estonia, Latvia and Lithuania. As of New Year's Day 2011, it contained 140,731 registered French voters. By far the greatest number of these (113,655) were living in the United Kingdom, the country with the third greatest number of registered French residents in the world. (In contrast, there were only 146 in Estonia, and just one in Greenland.)

This constituency elected its first ever representative at the 2012 French legislative election.

== Deputies ==
Election	Member	Party
2012	Axelle Lemaire	PS
2014	Christophe Premat	PS
2017	Alexandre Holroyd	LREM
2022	Alexandre Holroyd	LREM
2024	Vincent Caure	RE

== National Assembly elections ==
=== 2024 ===
Candidate	Party	Alliance	First round		Second round	
Candidate	Party	Alliance	Votes	%	Votes	%
Charlotte Minvielle	LÉ	NFP	26,873	39.22	37,326	49.46
Vincent Caure	RE	Ensemble	26,810	39.13	38,134	50.54
Sophie Charbonnet	RN		4,504	6.57		
Balthazar Roger	LR	UDC	3,442	5.02		
Assamahou Lamarre	DVC		3,365	4.91		
Joël Heslaut	DVC		1,251	1.83		
Anthony Coutret	REC		752	1.10		
Tanguy Pinomaa-Danzé	DVG	Volt	701	1.02		
Emmanuel Constantin	ECO		355	0.52		
Tim Craye	DVD		236	0.34		
Yvan Bachaud	DIV		226	0.33		
Valid votes			68,515	100.00	75,460	100.00
Blank votes			829	1.19	2,707	3.46
Null votes			112	0.16	71	0.09
Turnout			69,456	43.24	78,238	48.71
Abstentions			91,178	56.76	82,389	51.29
Registered voters			160,634		160,627	
Result			RE HOLD			

=== 2022 ===
Legislative Election 2022: 3rd constituency for French citizens overseas
Party	Candidate	Votes	%	±%
LREM (Ensemble)	Alexandre Holroyd	16,238	38.51	-19.29
EELV (NUPÉS)	Charlotte Minvielle	13,265	31.46	+1.50
DVC	Laurence Helaili-Chapuis	3,623	8.59	N/A
LR (UDC)	Bertrand Dupont	2,302	5.46	−3.36
DIV	Assamahou Lamarre	1,998	4.74	N/A
REC	Margaux Darrieus	1,474	3.50	N/A
GRS (FGR)	Valérie Romboni	1,095	2.60	N/A
RN	Willy Begon	698	1.66	N/A
Volt	Aude Cazein	689	1.63	N/A
DIV	Thomas Lepeltier	584	1.39	N/A
PRG	Coralie Bailly	195	0.46	N/A
Turnout		42,161	28.60	+7.48
2nd round result
LREM (Ensemble)	Alexandre Holroyd	24,749	55.80	-14.31
EELV (NUPÉS)	Charlotte Minvielle	19,601	44.20	+14.31
Turnout		44,350	30.65	+13.11
LREM hold				

=== 2017 ===
==== Candidates ====
The list of candidates was officially finalised on 15 May. There are 16 candidates, 10 women and 6 men:

The En Marche! Party chose Alexandre HOLROYD, a resident of London, as its candidate. His deputy (suppléant) is Laure PHILIPPON MAILLARD, also a resident of London.

The Socialist Party chose Axelle LEMAIRE, a resident of London, as its candidate. Her deputy (suppléant) is Matthieu PINARD.

The Republicans Party chose Laurence AZZENA- GOUGEON as its candidate. Her deputy (suppléant) is Philippe CHALON.

The France Insoumise Party chose Olivier TONNEAU as its candidate. His deputy (suppléant) is Anne PHILIPPE.

The National Front chose Tony Thommes. Xavier Rollin was his deputy.

==== Campaign ====
The elections will take place on:

- 4 June for the first round
- 18 June for the second round

This year there was no electronic vote available due to cyber threats.

The campaign officially started on 23 May.

6 of the candidates held a debate organised and hosted by Le Petit Journal at King's College in London on 23 May 2017.

The next debate will take place on 13 June between the 2 candidates qualified for the second round.

==== Results ====
Summary of the 4 June and 18 June 2017 French legislative election results
Candidate	Party		1st round		2nd round	
Candidate	Party		Votes	%	Votes	%
Alexandre Holroyd	La Republique En Marche!	REM	14,663	57.80%	14,453	70.11%
Axelle Lemaire	Socialist Party	PS	2,493	9.83%	6,163	29.89%
Laurence Azzena-Gougeon	The Republicans	LR	2,238	8.82%		
Olivier Tonneau	La France insoumise	FI	1,823	7.19%		
Patricia Connell	Union of Democrats and Independents	UDI	1,392	5.49%		
Karine Daudicourt	Europe Ecology – The Greens	EELV	1,384	5.46%		
Tony Thommes	National Front	FN	378	1.49%		
Béatrice Pauly	Christian Democratic Party	PCD	231	0.91%		
Pierre-Alexandre Greil	Popular Republican Union	UPR	201	0.79%		
Olivier Bitterlin	Independent Ecological Movement	MEI	196	0.77%		
Marine Roussillon	Communist Party	PCF	122	0.48%		
Cindy Demichel	#MyVoice		93	0.37%		
Véronique Vermorel	Pirate Party	PP	78	0.31%		
Palmira Pozo	Front of Republican Patriots	RPF	68	0.27%		
Florence Sarlat	Animalist Party	PA	8	0.03%		
Thierry Rignol	Miscellaneous right	DVD	2	0.01%		
Total			25,370	100%	20,616	100%
Registered voters			120,696		120,692	
Blank ballots			43	0.17%	426	2.01%
Null ballots			81	0.32%	127	0.60%
Turnout			25,494	21.12%	21,169	17.54%
Abstentions			95,202	78.88%	99,523	82.46%

=== 2012 ===
==== Candidates ====
The list of candidates was officially finalised on 14 May. There were twenty candidates:

The Socialist Party chose Axelle Lemaire, a resident of London, as its candidate. Her deputy (suppléant) was Christophe Premat, a resident of Stockholm.

The Union for a Popular Movement chose Emmanuelle Savarit, with Geoffrey Party as her deputy (suppléant).

The Left Front chose Lucile Jamet, with Sébastien Mas as her deputy (suppléant).

The Democratic Movement chose Yannick Naud as its candidate. Marianne Magnin was his deputy (suppléante).

Europe Écologie–The Greens chose Olivier Bertin. A resident of London, Bertin ran a bilingual preschool. He was also a member of the Green Party of England and Wales. Natacha Blisson was his deputy (suppléante).

The National Front chose Guy Le Guezennec. Gérard Berardi was his deputy.

The centre-right Radical Party and the centrist Republican, Ecologist and Social Alliance jointly chose Olivier de Chazeaux as their candidate, with Nathalie Chassaigne-Rombaut as his deputy.

The Radical Party of the Left chose Ezella Sahraoui. Alain Malcolm Douet was her deputy.

The Christian Democratic Party chose Denys Dhiver as its candidate. Dhiver, who was a member of the Union for a Popular Movement as well as of the CDP, was also endorsed by France Ecologie. Jorice Samuel is his deputy.

The Centrist Alliance chose Olivier Cadic, with Sophie Routier as his deputy.

Solidarity and Progress, the French branch of the LaRouche movement, was represented by Édith Tixier, with Yannick Caroff as her deputy.

Will Mael Nyamat stood as an independent candidate (miscellaneous left). A former member of the French Socialist Party, he left it and became a member of the British Labour Party. He was a resident of London. Dja-Tsingue Nzigou is his deputy.

Christophe Schermesser, who has lived and worked in Ireland, England and Finland, was the candidate of the European Federalist Party. Danielle Schermesser was his deputy.

Gaspard Koenig, a resident of London, was the candidate for the small French Liberal Democratic Party (which espouses economic liberalism). (It bears no relation to the British party of the same name.) Olivia Penichou is his deputy.

Marie-Claire Sparrow was the candidate of the Gathering of French Residents Overseas (Rassemblement des Français de l'étranger), related to the Union for a Popular Movement. Richard Dimosi was her deputy.

Aberzack Boulariah, an "expatriate entrepreneur", was an independent candidate. Marc Ambroise was his deputy.

Jérôme de Lavenère Lussan was a legal entrepreneur running as an independent candidate. Fahd Rachidi was his deputy.

The other independent candidates were: Bernard Larmoyer (with Virginie Charles as his deputy); Anne-Marie Wolfsohn (with Maïlys Michot-Casbas as her deputy); and Patrick Kaboza (with David Judaique as his deputy).

==== Campaign ====
Although campaigning was difficult due to the sheer size of the constituency, some candidates did travel to several countries to talk to expatriates. In addition, a debate over two evenings was organised at King's College, London in late May by Le Club Démocrate (UK), with many of the candidates taking part. A number of candidates were also interviewed (separately) on French Radio London.

A major issue for voters was reportedly the cost and accessibility of French schools abroad.

With a large majority of voters living in the UK, and twelve of the twenty candidates based there (including nine in London), the UK was a focal point of the campaign.

==== Results ====
As in other constituencies, turnout was low in the first round. Latvia was the only country in this constituency in which over half of registered French residents voted (57.3%). Turnout was also comparatively high in Estonia (41.1%) and Lithuania (41.0%). It was lowest in the United Kingdom (18.8%) and Ireland (21.8%). Nonetheless, French residents in the United Kingdom cast 72.53% of all ballots cast in this constituency.

Socialist candidate Axelle Lemaire won the first round vote by a clear margin. She finished first in every country except Estonia. Lemaire went on to win the second round by a large margin. When Lemaire was appointed Digital Affairs Minister in April 2014, her seat was taken by Christophe Premat.

Legislative Election 2012: Overseas residents 3 – 2nd round
Party	Candidate	Votes	%	±%
PS	Axelle Lemaire	9,679	54.76	–
UMP	Emmanuelle Savarit	7,997	45.24	–
Turnout		18,178	20.56	–
PS win (new seat)				

Legislative Election 2012: Overseas residents 3 – 1st round
Party	Candidate	Votes	%	±%
PS	Axelle Lemaire	5 486	30.16	–
UMP	Emmanuelle Savarit	3 934	21.63	–
AC	Olivier Cadic	2 063	11.34	–
EELV	Olivier Bertin	1 877	10.32	–
MoDem	Yannick Naud	1 126	6.19	–
PLD	Gaspard Koenig	801	4.40	–
FG	Lucile Jamet	671	3.69	–
FN	Guy Le Guezennec	493	2.71	–
Independent	Anne-Marie Wolfsohn	488	2.68	–
DVD	Marie-Claire Sparrow	379	2.08	–
VIA	Denys Dhiver	253	1.39	–
Independent	Jérôme de Lavenère Lussan	150	0.82	–
Radical	Olivier de Chazeaux	125	0.69	–
Independent	Aberzack Boulariah	80	0.44	–
PRG	Ezella Sahraoui	67	0.37	–
Independent	Bernard Larmoyer	61	0.34	–
European Federalists	Christophe Schermesser	49	0.27	–
DVG	Will Mael Nyamat	45	0.25	–
SP	Édith Tixier	38	0.21	–
Independent	Patrick Kaboza	4	0.02	–
Turnout		18 402	20.8	n/a

== Presidential elections ==
=== 2017 ===
Summary of the French presidential election results in the 3rd overseas constituency
Candidate	Party		1st round		2nd round	
Candidate	Party		Votes	%	Votes	%
Emmanuel Macron	En Marche!	EM	29,273	50.27%	57,288	94.73%
François Fillon	The Republicans	LR	12,835	22.04%		
Jean-Luc Mélenchon	La France insoumise	FI	7,807	13.41%		
Benoît Hamon	Socialist Party	PS	4,497	7.72%		
Marine Le Pen	National Front	FN	1,833	3.15%	3,185	5.27%
Nicolas Dupont-Aignan	Debout la France	DLF	790	1.36%		
François Asselineau	Popular Republican Union	UPR	470	0.81%		
Philippe Poutou	New Anticapitalist Party	NPA	315	0.54%		
Jean Lassalle	Résistons!		192	0.33%		
Nathalie Arthaud	Lutte Ouvrière	LO	130	0.22%		
Jacques Cheminade	Solidarity and Progress	S&P	92	0.16%		
Total			58,234	100%	60,473	100%
