= Tenth French legislative constituency for citizens abroad =

Constituency for French residents overseas

10th constituency for French residents overseas
- inline Constituency of the National Assembly of France

- Deputy: Amal Amélia Lakrafi; RE
- Department: none (overseas residents)
- Cantons: none
- Registered voters: 113,835

The Tenth French legislative constituency for citizens abroad (dixième circonscription des Français établis hors de France) is one of eleven constituencies each electing one representative of French people living outside France to the French National Assembly.

== Area ==
It covers all French citizens living in the following forty-eight countries of Central, Eastern and Southern Africa, and of the Middle East: Angola, Bahrain, Benin, Botswana, Burundi, Chad, Cameroon, Central African Republic, Comoros, Democratic Republic of the Congo, Republic of the Congo, Djibouti, Egypt, Eritrea, Ethiopia, Equatorial Guinea, Gabon, Ghana, Iraq, Jordan, Kenya, Kuwait, Lebanon, Lesotho, Madagascar, Malawi, Mauritius, Mozambique, Namibia, Nigeria, Oman, Qatar, Rwanda, Sao Tome and Principe, Saudi Arabia, Seychelles, Somalia, South Africa, Sudan, Swaziland, Syria, Tanzania, Togo, United Arab Emirates, Uganda, Yemen, Zambia, and Zimbabwe. It does not include the overseas departments of Mayotte and Réunion, which are part of France and have their own constituencies.

As of New Year's Day 2011, the Tenth constituency contained 140,310 registered French voters - of which 19,725 in Lebanon and 19,930 in Madagascar, the two countries in the region with the greatest number of registered French residents.

This constituency elected its first ever representative at the 2012 French legislative election.

== Deputies ==
Deputies from the 10th constituency for French residents overseas elected to the National Assembly for the legislatures of the 5th Republic.
Legislature	Start of mandate	End of mandate	Deputy	Party	Notes	Substitute
14th	20 June 2012	20 June 2017	Alain Marsaud	UMP		Fabienne Blineau
15th	21 June 2017	21 June 2022	Amal Amélia Lakrafi	LREM		Joe Moukarzel
16th	22 June 2022	9 June 2024	Amal Amélia Lakrafi	LREM		Joe Moukarzel
17th	18 July 2024	Incumbent	Amal Amélia Lakrafi	RE		Joe Moukarzel

== Election results ==
=== 2024 ===
Candidate	Party	Alliance	First round		Second round	
Candidate	Party	Alliance	Votes	%	Votes	%
Elsa Di Meo	PS	NFP	11,651	32.52	14,986	46.77
Amélia Lakrafi	RE	Ensemble	11,398	31.82	17,055	53.23
Jean De Veron	LR	UXD	6,147	17.16		
Lucas Lamah	LR	UDC	3,488	9.74		
Marie Josée Mabasi	DVC		948	2.65		
Philippe Castellan	REC		842	2.35		
Ali Camille Hojeij	DVC		709	1.98		
Odile Mojon-Cheminade	DIV		450	1.26		
Sandra Larose	DIV		94	0.26		
Julie Lagui	DIV		70	0.20		
Hugues Michel Marie-Louise	DIV		20	0.06		
Nathalie Mazot	DVG		7	0.02		
Valid votes			35,824	100.00	32,041	100.00
Blank votes			563	1.54	2,328	6.73
Null votes			115	0.32	200	0.58
Turnout			36,502	32.06	34,569	30.37
Abstentions			77,353	67.94	79,266	69.63
Registered voters			113,855		113,835	
Result			RE HOLD			

=== 2022 ===
Legislative Election 2022: 10th constituency for French citizens overseas
Party	Candidate	Votes	%	±%
LREM (Ensemble)	Amal Amélia Lakrafi	6,558	32.75	-27.33
LFI (NUPÉS)	Chantal Moussa	4,513	22.54	+14.05
LR (UDC)	Aurélie Pirillo	2,172	10.85	−8.04
REC	Georges Azar	1,702	8.50	N/A
DIV	Caline Maaraoui	1,110	5.54	N/A
DVC	Alain Taieb	1,083	5.41	N/A
DVC	Elisabeth Darvish	777	3.88	N/A
HOR	Ali Camille Hojeij*	639	3.19	N/A
RN	Deborah Raumain	420	2.10	−3.43
Others	N/A	1,051	5.24	−
Turnout		20,025	19.52	−0.02
2nd round result
LREM (Ensemble)	Amal Amélia Lakrafi	13,048	63.58	-7.67
LFI (NUPÉS)	Chantal Moussa	7,474	36.42	N/A
Turnout		20,522	20.83	+2.57
LREM hold				

* Horizons dissident

=== 2017 ===
Candidate	Label	First round		Second round	
Candidate	Label	Votes	%	Votes	%
Amal Amélia Lakrafi	REM	11,515	60.08	12,397	71.25
Alain Marsaud	LR	3,620	18.89	5,002	28.75
William Gueraiche	DVG	1,269	6.62		
Stéphane Sakoschek	FN	1,060	5.53		
Gustave Fayard	DVD	553	2.89		
Viviane Zinzindohoue	ECO	359	1.87		
Guillaume de Bricourt	DVD	258	1.35		
Noémie Potier	DIV	174	0.91		
Franck Mériau	DVG	139	0.73		
Laure Ferry	DIV	128	0.67		
Vincent Fournerie	DIV	90	0.47		
Votes		19,165	100.00	17,399	100.00
Valid votes		19,165	98.69	17,399	95.33
Blank votes		175	0.90	686	3.76
Null votes		79	0.41	167	0.91
Turnout		19,419	19.54	18,252	18.26
Abstentions		79,955	80.46	81,704	81.74
Registered voters		99,374		99,956	
Source: Ministry of the Interior

=== 2012 ===
==== Candidates ====
The list of candidates was officially finalised on 14 May. There were nineteen candidates:

The Socialist Party chose Jean-Daniel Chaoui, a resident of Antananarivo, as its candidate. His deputy (suppléante) was Rita Maalouf, a resident of Beirut.

The Union for a Popular Movement chose Alain Marsaud, a former judge. While he was established in France, his deputy (suppléante), Fabienne Blineau-Abiramia, was a resident of Beirut.

The Left Front chose Axelle Brémont-Bellini, a student of Egyptology and Anthropology in Cairo. She was a member of the French Communist Youth Movement, and fluent speaker of Arabic. Regarding the specifics of the constituency, she advocated the teaching of local languages in French expatriate schools, and "a transparent foreign policy respectful of the values of the Republic, with an end to Françafrique, and for a socially and environmentally sustainable development". Her deputy (suppléant) was Daniel Feurtet.

Europe Écologie–The Greens chose Lucien Bruneau, a resident of Addis-Abeba, with Agnès Joignerez as his deputy (suppléante).

The National Front chose Francis Maginot, a telecommunications engineer, with Jad Ghantous as his deputy.

The centre-right Radical Party and the centrist Republican, Ecologist and Social Alliance jointly chose François Kahn as their candidate. He ran several companies which provide medical equipment for hospitals and clinics in Africa and the Middle East. His deputy was Ali Liaquat.

The centre-left Radical Party of the Left chose Saliha Ayadi, who had dual French and Algerian citizenship. Her deputy was Adrien Houabaloukou.

Solidarity and Progress, the French branch of the LaRouche movement, was represented by Pierre Bonnefoy, with Eric Mercier as his deputy.

Guy Makki, a member of the Union for a Popular Movement who did not obtain the endorsement of the party, stood as an independent. A resident of Dubai, he worked for BNP Paribas. His deputy was Marie Ferlay.

Patricia Elias Smida, a lawyer who lived and worked in both Lebanon and Gabon, stood as an independent candidate. She was a dissident member of the UMP. Her deputy was Xavier du Bourg de la Tour.

Marcel Misslin de Robillard, a resident of Mauritius, stood as an independent candidate. His deputy was Danielle Audineau-Herauld.

François Bridon, who was of French and Cameroonian descent and worked as a farmer in Cameroon, stood as an independent candidate. He had also lived in Gabon and Côte d'Ivoire. His deputy was Nina Tamic.

Jean-Pierre Pont, a journalist, was another independent candidate. His deputy was Mirna Khalifé.

The other independent candidates were: Bertrand Langlade (with Roger Teuron as deputy); Louis Perriere (with Jean-Marie Pierret); José Garson (with Bernard Boumba); Boudjema Naidji (with Malika Naidji); Adeline Kargue (with Andréas Loebell); and Habib Abi Yaghi Deguy (with Nadine Honeika).

==== Results ====
As in the other expatriate constituencies, turnout in the first round was low. Only in Botswana did over half (55.9%) of registered French citizens vote. Turnout was also comparatively high in Burundi (43.9%), Rwanda (42.7%) and Oman (42.1%). By contrast, turnout was a staggeringly low 0.6% in Syria, where only 9 people voted, out of the 1,542 French residents registered there in late 2010. Syria at the time of the election was undergoing a violent internal conflict, and it is likely that many French residents had left the country. In Yemen, which had just experienced a revolution, turnout was also very low (9.1%), suggesting that some French residents had left the country prior to the election. Turnout was also notably low in the Comoros (6.7%), Egypt, where there had been a revolution in 2011 (18.3%), and South Africa (18.8%). In newly established South Sudan, where a polling station was set up in Juba, eight of the twenty-two registered French citizens voted (36.4%).

This is one of only three expatriate constituencies in which the main candidate of the right finished first in the first round. Independent right-wing candidate Patricia Elias Smida also did well, obtaining more than 10% of the vote and finishing third.

Independent candidate Louis Perrière obtained just two votes - one cast in Benin, the other in South Africa.

Legislative Election 2012: Overseas residents 10 - 2nd round
Party	Candidate	Votes	%	±%
UMP	Alain Marsaud	10,919	53.13	−
PS	Jean-Daniel Chaoui	9,631	46.87	−
Turnout		21,038	23,04	
UMP win (new seat)				

Legislative Election 2012: Overseas residents 10
Party	Candidate	Votes	%	±%
UMP	Alain Marsaud	6,749	32.13	−
PS	Jean-Daniel Chaoui	6,060	28.85	−
DVD	Patricia Elias Smida	2,250	10.71	−
EELV	Lucien Bruneau	1,388	6.61	−
FN	Francis Maginot	1,329	6.33	−
Radical	François Kahn	941	4.48	−
DVD	Guy Makki	567	2.70	−
FG	Axelle Brémont-Bellini	504	2.40	−
Independent	Jean-Pierre Pont	467	2.22	−
Independent	Habib Abi Yaghi Deguy	198	0.94	−
PRG	Saliha Ayadi	177	0.84	−
Independent	Marcel Misslin de Robillard	155	0.74	−
SP	Pierre Bonnefoy	75	0.36	−
Independent	José Garson	64	0.30	−
Independent	Adeline Kargue	55	0.26	−
Independent	Bertrand Langlade	10	0.05	−
Independent	Boudjema Naidji	8	0.04	−
Independent	François Bridon	6	0.03	−
Independent	Louis Perriere	2	0.01	−
Turnout		14,059	15.35	n/a
