= Jonathan-Simon Sellem =

Jonathan-Simon Sellem (Hebrew: יונתן-סימון סלם) is a French-Israeli journalist, writer, and politician born on February 25, 1983. He now lives in Israel since 2006, and he obtained dual nationality French-Israeli the same year. He is the founder of the news website JSSNews. He was elected as "conseiller consulaire" - official representative of French citizen in Israel - in 2014 and advisor of Ron Huldaï, Mayor of Tel-Aviv, in October 2018.

Although not a trained historian, Jonathan-Simon Sellem is widely regarded as one of the foremost experts on Max Nordau — the physician, thinker, and founding figure of modern Zionism — due to his extensive research and several books dedicated to Nordau's life and legacy.

After having presented the TV News for 3 years for the TFJ television channel and working for Actualité Juive and several other French medias, in 2006 he moved to Israel. He wrote the Plaidoyer contre la désinformation (Advocacy against misinformation) during the 2006 Israel-Lebanon Conflict and denounced what he believes to be the French media's propaganda against Israel.

He also worked for the Ministry of Foreign Affairs when he arrived in Jerusalem. In 2008 he created JSSNews, an Israeli French speaking webzine specializing in news about Israel, Middle East, Zionism and the Jewish world.

The 13 January 2013 he was invited to the National Convention of the CRIF and he gives a speech on "from anti-Zionism to anti-Semitism."

On 20 February 2013, he officially declared his candidacy to become member of the Assembly of French Citizens Abroad, in the 8th district (including Israel, Italy, Turkey, Greece, Cyprus, Malta, San Marino and the Vatican). In announcing his candidacy, he said he wanted to fight that French citizens abroad are under-considered by the French political class and the media. French actress Véronique Genest supported him to the next election regarding the French citizens abroad. At the time, he received 15% of the French Israeli votes. Then, he concurred with the support of Liberal Democratic Party political party (center right).

In January 2014, he was elected as one of the 11 representatives of the French in Israel and in Palestinian territories, in the advisory "Conseil consulaire". In the election organized by the Embassy of France, more than 60,000 voters were asked to vote (representing 150,000 French living in Israel and in Palestinian territories). For this election, Jonathan-Simon Sellem was the head of the UMP-UDI list (right, center-right), which gained 1528 votes, 50.38%.

In November 2014, he was invited as speaker (by the Israeli Jewish Congress), in Washington DC, at the Jewish Federations of North America, General Assembly. He was invited to lecture about the rise of antisemitism in France and about the departure of French Jewish citizens to Israel.

On February 3, 2015, he was invited at The Algemeiner Gala in New-York City, to receive a prize as one of the 2014 Top-100 people influencing positively jewish life. On October 20, 2021, an Israeli-based Zionist Association, awarded him the prize of the Zionist activist of the year 2022. This rewards his research work and his publications on the beginnings of the Zionist movement (his second and third book) as well than his volunteer commitment with the association he created, HaFrayerim.

On October 20, 2018, he gained 85% of the French-Israeli vote at the Municipal Council election of Tel-Aviv. He became, de facto, the advisor of the Mayor and offer 1,8 of the Municipal Council to the Mayor. The political news website Israel-Valley confirmed his nomination as such as LPH Magazine.

Jonathan-Simon Sellem is also the founder of the Israeli NGO HaFrayerim, whose goal is to fight against the high cost of living in Israel as well as for greater social justice, especially for Holocaust survivors who are poorly housed or who do not have enough to buy food and medicine every day.

According to an article published in France in January 2023, "Jonathan-Simon Sellem spends a lot of time in Africa where he is friendly with many heads of state." He handles their communications campaigns and some of their relationships with foreign politicians." This article also adds that he is a renowned spin doctor who has built a reputation as a discreet but influential figure in Africa as well as in Europe. A famous Brazilian media also wrote that "as a political strategist Jonathan-Simon Sellem is considered a genius in his field. With more than 15 years of experience in political campaigns, he is known for his ability to anticipate trends and make accurate decisions."

According to the Spanish-language newspaper El Tiempo, he is nicknamed "the white sorcerer" or "the expert" by African and South American government officials.

== Books ==
- Charles De Gaulle: antisemite?, self-published, 2018-09-15, ISBN 978-1-7237-3777-0
- Les vrais protocoles des sages de Sion : le premier congrès sioniste, version intégrale, adaptée en français et annotée, self-published, 2020-04-2, ISBN 979-8-6307-2274-4
- Haïm: Du premier Congrès Sioniste à la première Présidence de l'État d'Israël, self-published, 2021-10-13, ISBN 979-8-4562-8734-2
- Max Nordau : Much more than a Tel-Aviv boulevard, self-published, 2022-12-27, ISBN 979-8-3666-2298-1
- Max Nordau : le Prince d'Israël, self-published, 2025-05-14, ISBN 979-8-3138-7041-0
- Vus du dehors : Essai de critique scientifique et philosophique, sur quelques auteurs contemporains, self-published, 2026-01-20, ISBN 979-8275759648
