= Ronan Le Gleut =

French politician (born 1976)

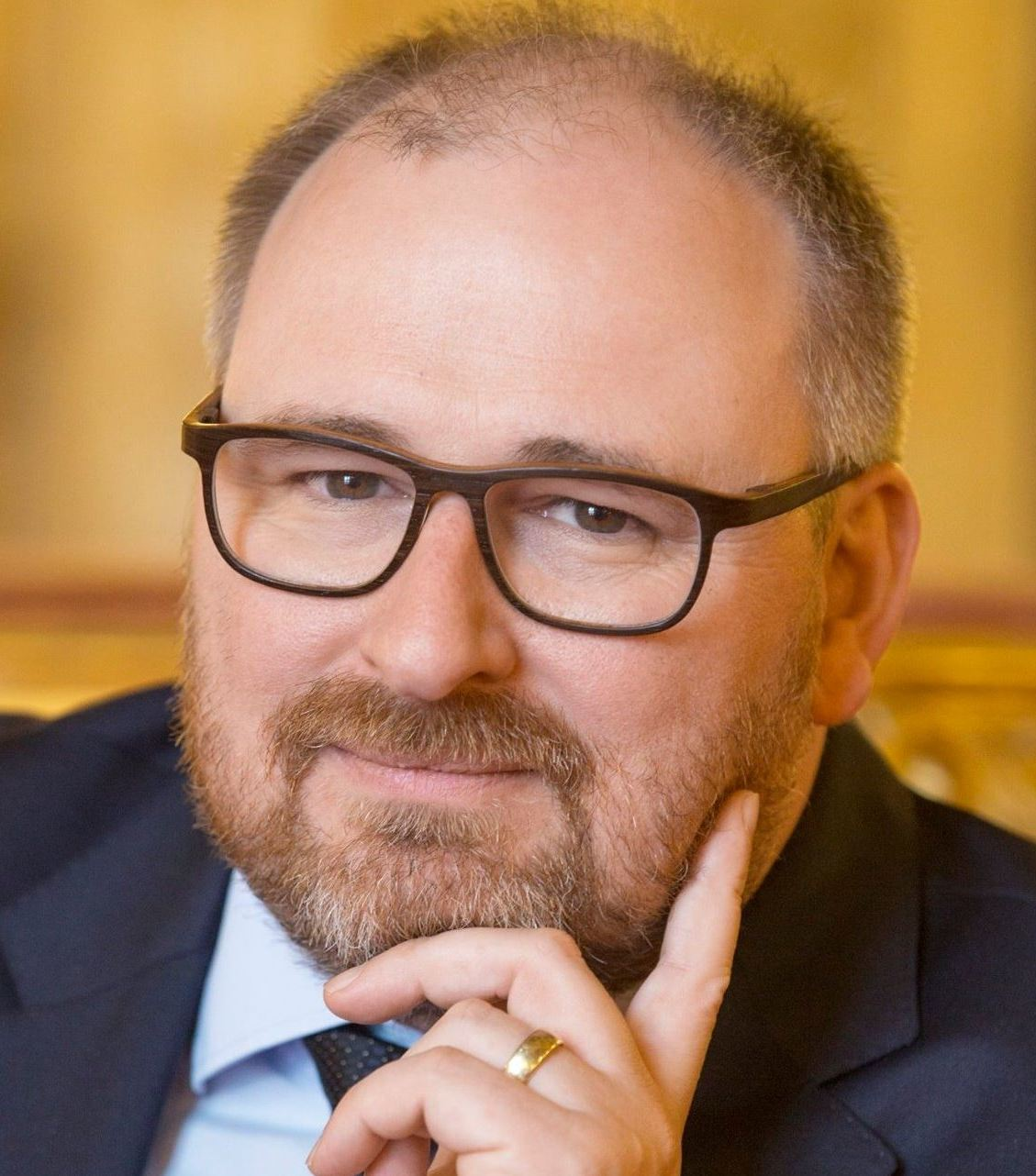
- Le Gleut in 2017

Member of the Senate
- Incumbent
- Assumed office 2 October 2017
- Constituency: French citizens living abroad

Personal details
- Born: 21 August 1976 (age 49)
- Party: The Republicans (since 2015)

Ronan Le Gleut (born 21 August 1976) is a French politician serving as a member of the Senate since 2017. From 2014 to 2018, he was a member of the Assembly of French Citizens Abroad and the conseil consulaire.

== Biography ==
Ronan Le Gleut was born on August 21, 1976 at the Louis-Pasteur military hospital of the French Forces in Berlin.

After the La Nativité high school in Aix-en-Provence, he studied telecommunications engineering at Télécom Lille (now IMT Nord Europe) and graduated in 2000. At the Center for International Intellectual Property Studies (CEIPI2) of the University of Strasbourg, he obtained a university diploma (D.U.) in Patents in 2006. He is registered on the list of "Qualified Persons in Industrial Property" with a mention in patent engineer of the National Institute of Industrial Property (INPI).

He was a candidate for deputy in the seventh constituency of French people living outside France (Central and Eastern Europe), during the 2012 legislative elections.

In December 2022, as part of the examination of the 2023 Finance Bill, Ronan Le Gleut gave a rather severe opinion on the resources devoted to cultural diplomacy by the government. He thus regrets the lack of investment for the French Institutes and the French Alliances.

In 2024, he was an auditor of the 4th national session of the Institute for Advanced Studies in National Defense (IHEDN) (2024-2025 cycle) within the 77th major "defense policy".

In January 2025, François Bonneau wrote a report on the state of relations between Africa and France. In this report entitled "Seeing Africa in all its States". They also made 20 proposals for the future and invited the French government to demonstrate "strategic patience" in the Sahel.
