= Meyer Habib =

French-Israeli politician (born 1961)

- מאיר חביב
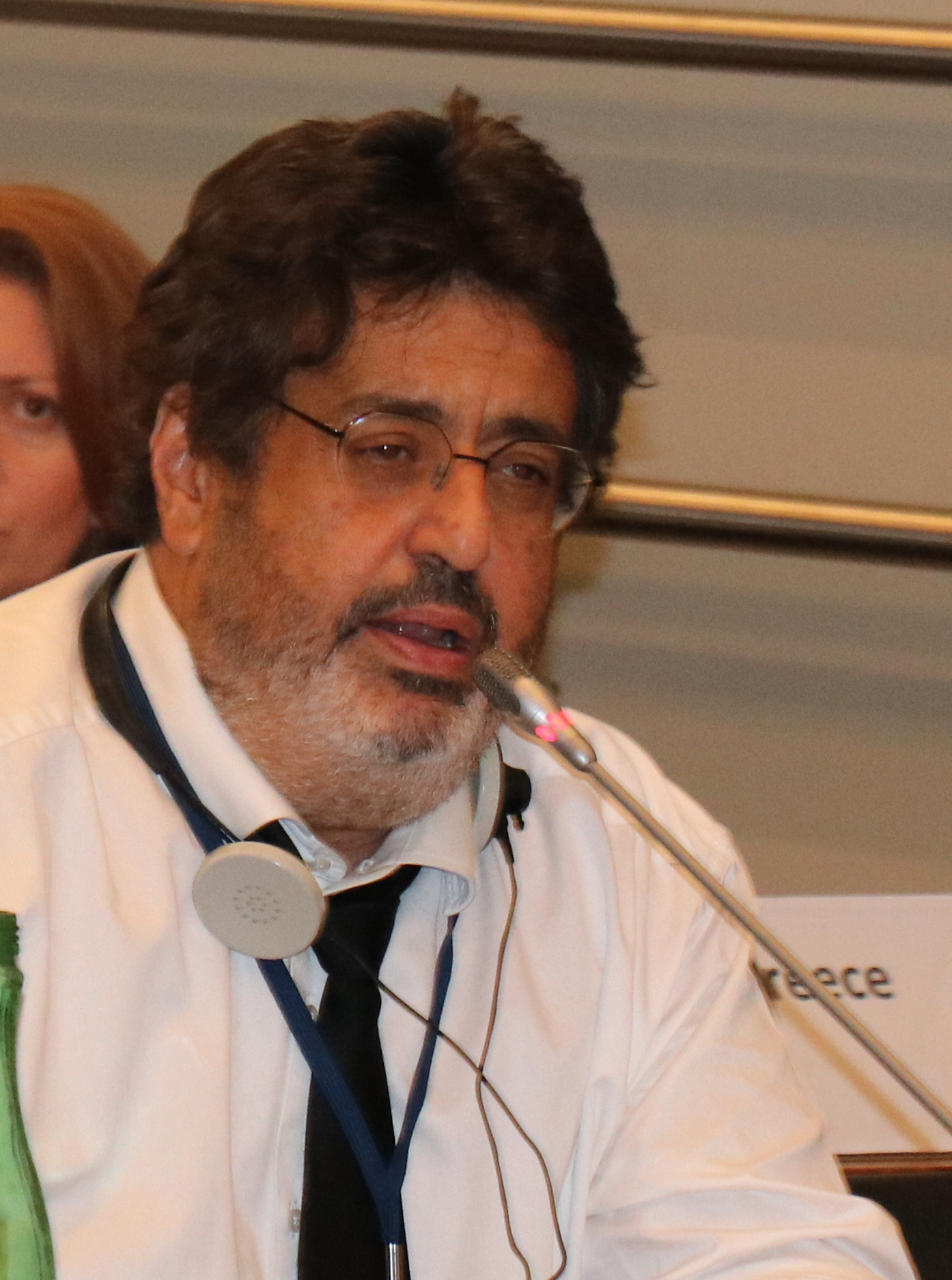
- Meyer Habib in 2024

Member of the National Assembly for Eighth constituency for French residents overseas
- In office 17 April 2023 – 9 June 2024
- Preceded by: vacant
- Succeeded by: Caroline Yadan
- In office 10 June 2013 – 3 February 2023
- Preceded by: Daphna Poznanski-Benhamou
- Succeeded by: vacant

Personal details
- Born: Meyer Dov Habib; 28 April 1961 (age 65) Paris, France
- Citizenship: France • Israel
- Party: Union of Democrats and Independents (2013–present); The Republicans (2023–present)
- Other political affiliations: Likud; Betar
- Children: 4
- Education: École Yabné
- Alma mater: Technion – Israel Institute of Technology

Meyer Dov Habib (Hebrew: מאיר חביב; born 28 April 1961) is a French-Israeli politician who served as a member of the French National Assembly from June 2013 to February 2023 and April 2023 to June 2024, representing the eighth constituency for French residents overseas.

== Early life ==
Born to a family of Jews of Tunisian origin, Habib was raised in Paris. His father was Emmanuel Habib, founder of "Vins Habib Frères", a Kosher wine manufacturing company.

== Political career ==
In parliament, Habib has been serving on the Committee on Foreign Affairs since 2013.

In the Republicans' 2016 presidential primary, Habib endorsed François Fillon as the party's candidate for the 2017 French presidential election.

In July 2016, documents from the office of Israeli Prime Minister Benjamin Netanyahu revealed that Habib financed several trips abroad by Netanyahu in the 2000s. Shortly after his re-election in 2017, he criticized the French media for bashing his long-standing friendship with Netanyahu.
