= Amal Amélia Lakrafi =

French politician

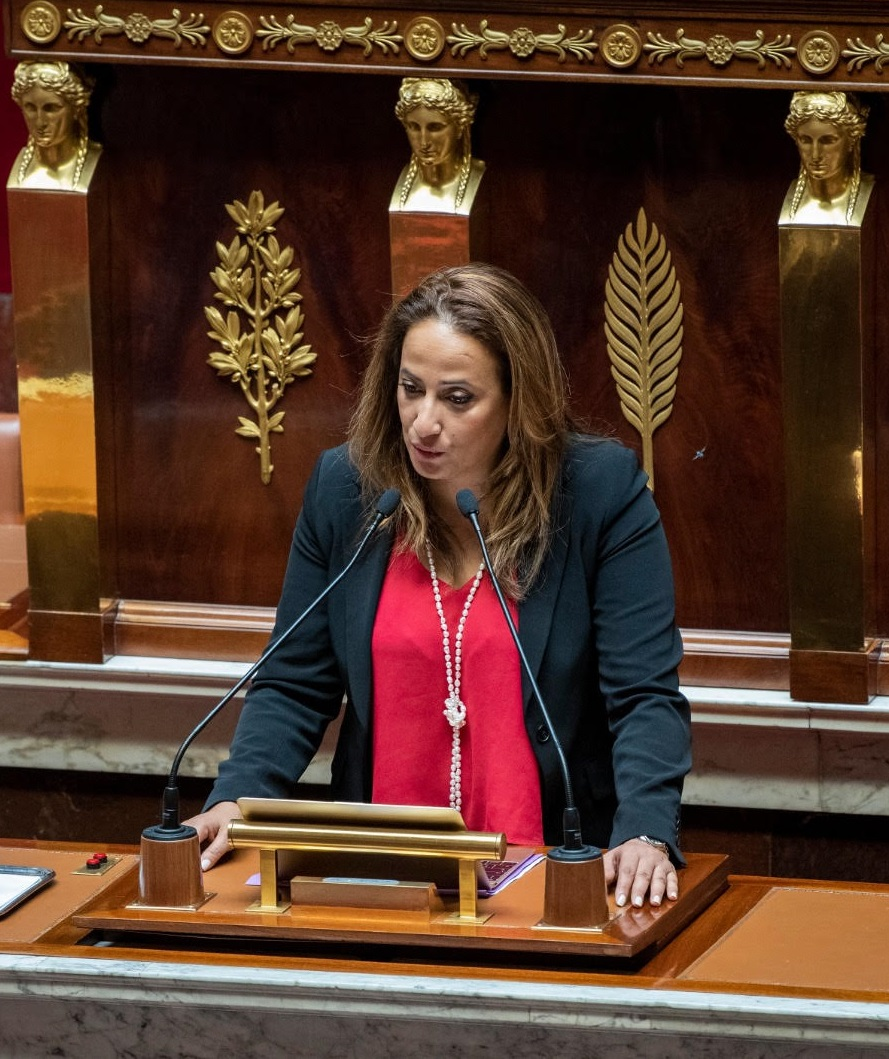

Member of the French National Assembly for the Tenth constituency for French residents overseas
- Incumbent
- Assumed office 21 June 2017
- Preceded by: Alain Marsaud

Personal details
- Born: 20 March 1978 (age 47) Casablanca, Morocco
- Political party: En Marche!
- Occupation: Business executive

Amal Amélia Lakrafi is a French politician of the Renaissance party who has been serving as a member of the National Assembly since the 2017 elections, representing the 10th district of French people living abroad, which includes Africa and the Middle East.

== Political career ==
For En Marche!, Lakrafi ran for the 2017 legislative elections and was elected with 71.25% of the vote against Alain Marsaud, outgoing MP for LR in the 10th constituency of the French residents overseas. In June 2022, Lakrafi successfully sought re-election, following a nomination of the party of Emmanuel Macron's presidential majority.

In the National Assembly, Lakrafi is a member of the Committee on Foreign Affairs. In addition to her committee assignments, she chairs the France-United Arab Emirates Friendship Group and is vice-president of the France-Democratic Republic of the Congo Friendship Group and the France-Chad Friendship Group.

== Political positions ==
In July 2019, Lakrafi voted in favor of the French ratification of the European Union’s Comprehensive Economic and Trade Agreement (CETA) with Canada.

== Other activities ==
- French Development Agency (AFD), Member of the Supervisory Board
