= Vincent Caure =

French politician (born 1992)

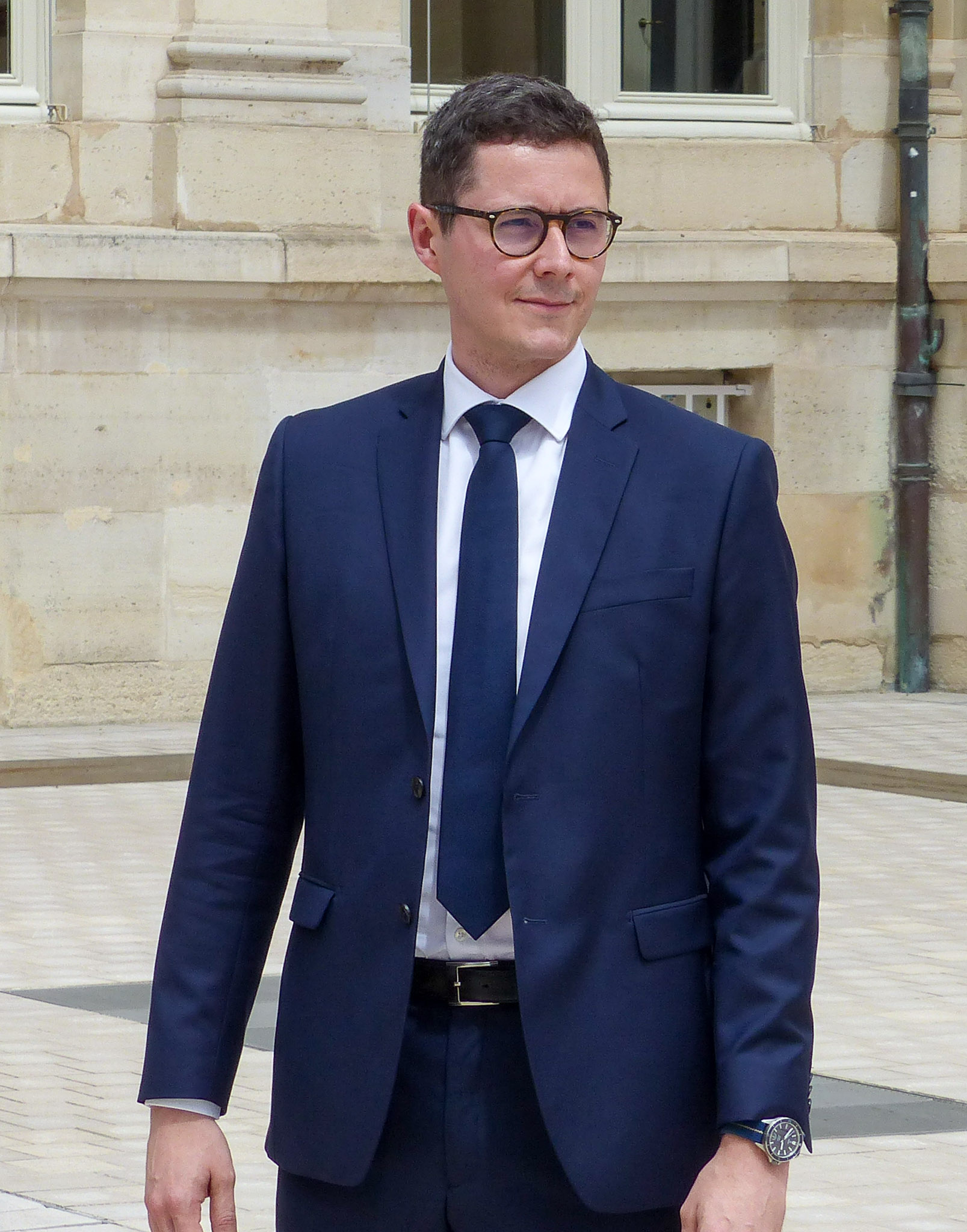
- Caure in 2024

Member of the French National Assembly for the 3rd constituency for citizens abroad
- Incumbent
- Assumed office 18 July 2024
- Preceded by: Alexandre Holroyd

Personal details
- Born: 31 December 1992 (age 33)
- Party: Renaissance

Vincent Caure (French pronunciation: [vɛ̃sɑ̃ kɔʁ]; born 31 December 1992) is a French politician of Renaissance. In the 2024 legislative election, he was elected member of the National Assembly for the 3rd constituency for citizens abroad. He previously worked as an advisor to Emmanuel Macron, Stéphane Séjourné and Jean-Baptiste Djebbari, and as chief of staff to Gilles Le Gendre and the Ensemble campaign team for the 2022 legislative election.
