= Pierre-Yves Le Borgn' =

French politician

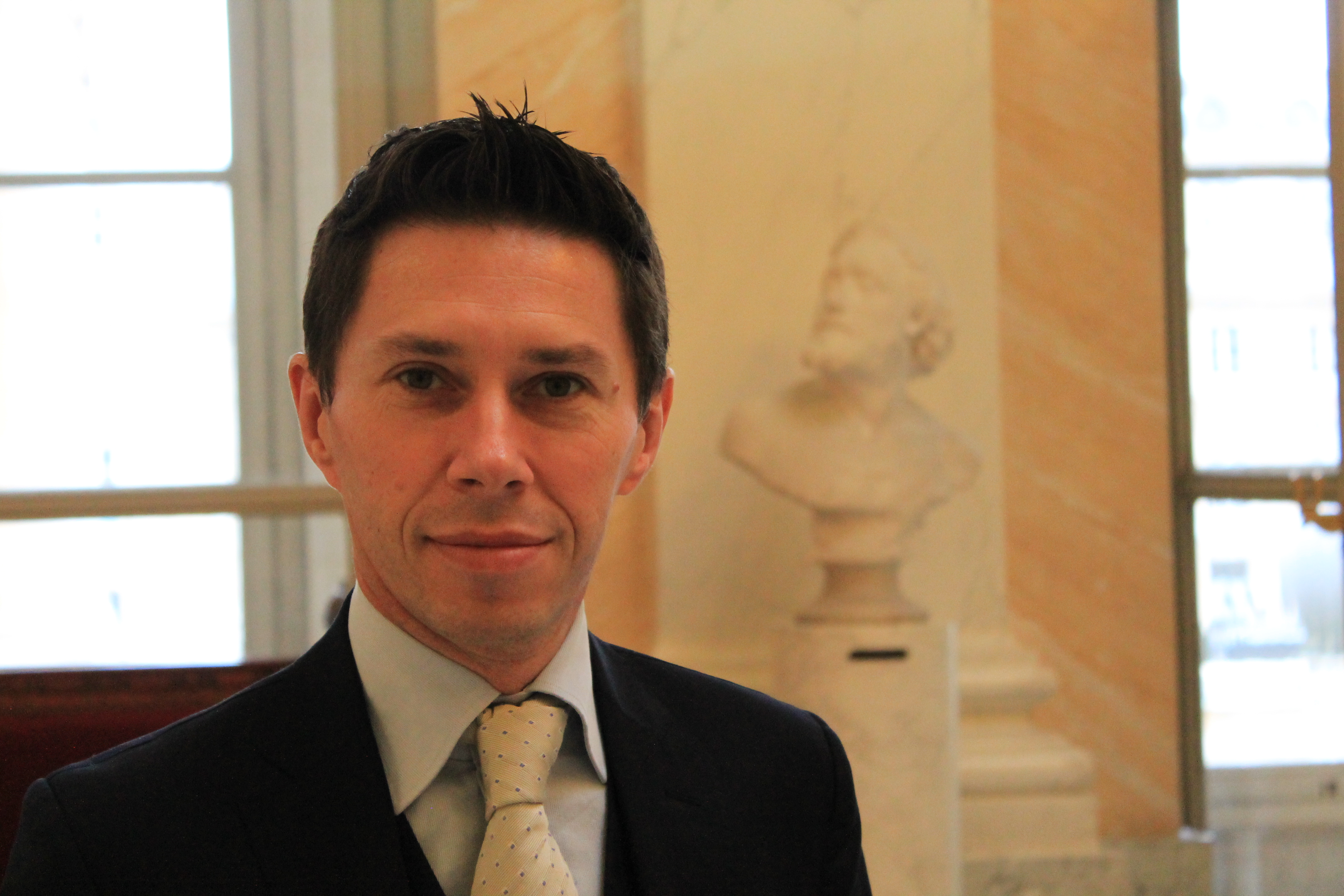

Pierre-Yves Le Borgn’ (born 4 November 1964 in Quimper) is a French Jurist and politician. He is a member of the Socialist Party (France). He was the deputy for the Seventh constituency for French residents overseas from 2012 to 2017.
