= Frédéric Petit (21st-century politician) =

French politician (born 1961)

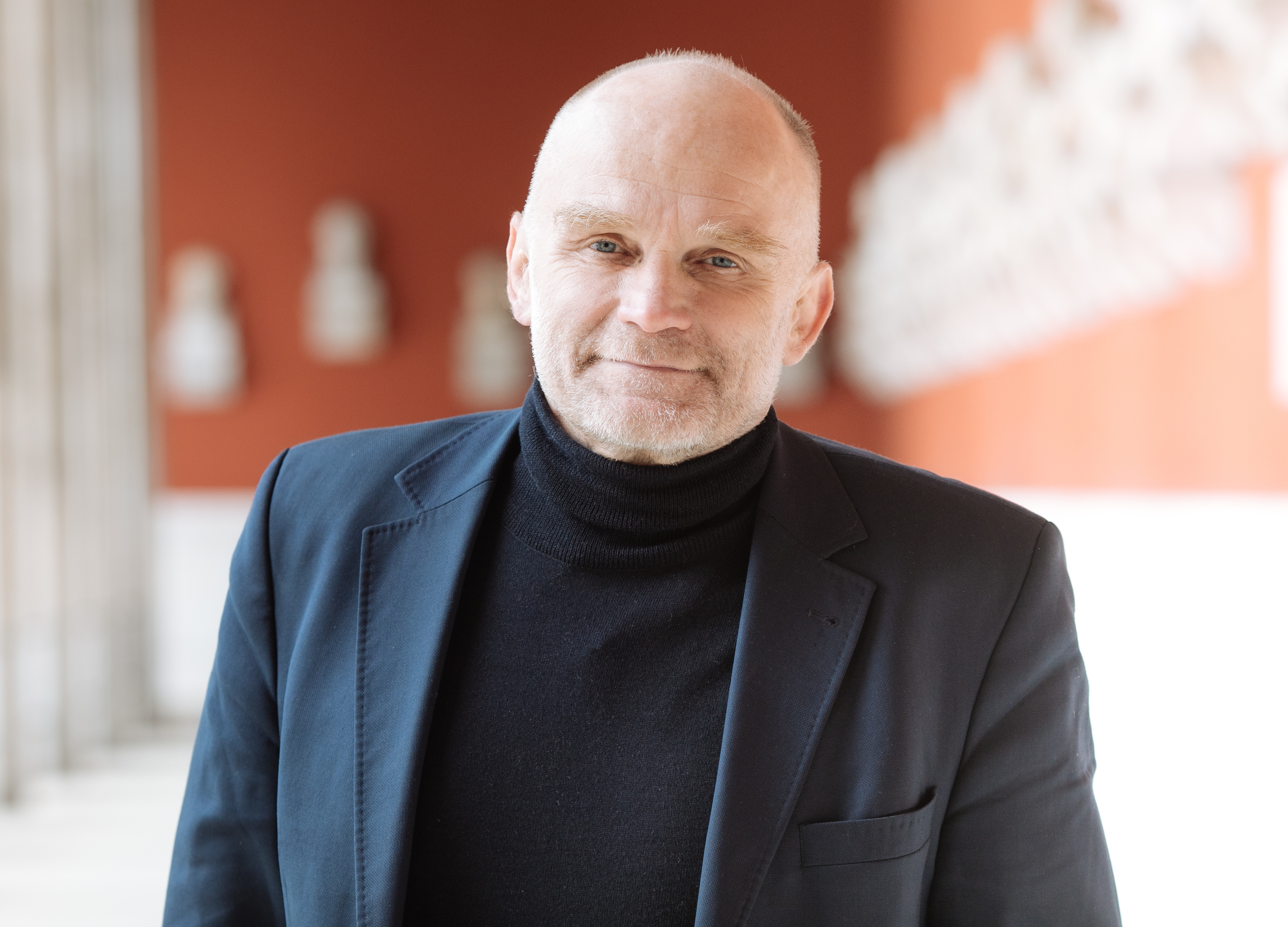

Member of the French National Assembly for Seventh constituency for French residents overseas
- Incumbent
- Assumed office 21 June 2017
- Preceded by: Pierre-Yves Le Borgn'
- Parliamentary group: MoDem

Personal details
- Born: 10 February 1961 (age 65) Marseille, France
- Party: Democratic Movement
- Education: National Polytechnic Institute of Lorraine, Paul Verlaine University – Metz
- Profession: Engineer
- Website: fredericpetit.eu

Frédéric Petit (born 10 February 1961 in Marseille, Bouches-du-Rhône) is a French engineer and politician of the Democratic Movement (MoDem) who has been serving as a member of the French National Assembly since 2017, representing the Seventh constituency for French residents overseas (Germany, Central Europe and the Balkans).

== Early life and education ==
Petit was born in 1961, in Marseille, to an engineer father and an English teacher mother. He grew up in Lorraine, where his father came to work in the steel industry. He attended the lycée Schuman, then entered the lycée Fabert to study higher mathematics.

Petit holds a degree in environmental engineering from the National Polytechnic Institute of Lorraine (ENSGSI and ENS de géologie). He studied history, modern literature, and musicology at the Paul Verlaine University – Metz, and has a DUT in business and administration management.

He is an engineer, but also a mediator, member of the National Chamber of Mediation Practitioners.

== Professional career ==
In September 1982, he did a 16-month national service in Cameroon, and on his return, he decided to work full time on a social project in the Borny ZUP, in Metz. He spent eleven years as director of the Borny social center management committee.

In 1994, he became director of the Bévoye intercultural center, a cross-border experience for young Europeans.

In 1998, he joined the Compagnie générale de chauffe, the forerunner of the Veolia Énergie group, which in 2000 offered him the opportunity to move to Central Europe (Lithuania and then Poland) where the group was actively developing at the time.

From 2005 to 2009, he managed Onyx Polska (Veolia Environnement). He was elected by the profession as President of the Polish Waste Treatment Employers' Union. In this capacity, he participated to the works of the Polish Parliament.

In 2009 and 2010, he worked on a freelance basis, carrying out a wide range of engineering and transition management assignments in Europe (methane capture in the old mines of the Donbas, advice to a Polish MEP for the Cop 15, heating network audits in Eastern Europe, etc.).

In August 2010, the BTP Consolis (Bonna Sabla) building and public works group asked him to go to Egypt, initially to revitalize its Egyptian subsidiary, then for objectives that were quickly less ambitious in economic terms after the Arab Spring. After five years, he returned to Poland, still for the Consolis group, to create "Consolis Central Europe". He manages this company and its subsidiaries (Romania, Hungary, Lithuania, Poland, Czech Republic, Serbia, Ukraine). He left the Consolis group in August 2016.

He is the owner of a patent concerning the balancing of large urban heating networks (INPI).

== Political career ==
=== Career in local politics ===
Petit was deputy mayor of Maizery (Moselle, 70 inhabitants) from 1995 to 2001.

=== Member of the National Assembly, 2017–present ===
In 2017, Petit was active within the Federation of French living abroad of the Mouvement démocrate (MoDem). He was appointed as a candidate under the agreements between La République en marche and the MoDem during the legislative elections in the Seventh constituency for French residents overseas. He won the second round against the outgoing Socialist deputy Pierre-Yves Le Borgn', receiving nearly 63% of the votes.

In the French National Assembly, Petit is a member of the MoDem group. He has been serving on the Foreign Affairs Committee. Within this committee, he is in charge of an annual budget report on French cultural diplomacy and influence which includes in particular the credits of the Agency for French Education Abroad, the French Institute, Atout France or Campus France.

In 2019, he was appointed co-rapporteur of the "Climate Change and Conflicts" information mission and made his first trip to Bangladesh from 9 to 13 December 2019, one of the countries most affected by climate change. On this occasion, he will meet with many government actors, academics and members of NGOs present there, including the 2006 Nobel Peace Prize winner, Muhammad Yunus. He will present his report in committee, along with his colleague and co-rapporteur Alain David, on January 27, 2021.

On 25 March 2019, following its constitutive meeting in Paris, Frédéric Petit joined the Franco-German Parliamentary Assembly before being appointed a member of its Bureau during its fourth session, on 21 and 22 September 2020. Within this Assembly, he is a member of the working groups "Artificial Intelligence and Disruptive Innovation" and "Foreign and Defense Policy".

In December 2020, Petit was appointed member of the Special Committee in charge of examining the bill consolidating the respect of the principles of the Republic.

On January 5, 2022, he presented an information report to the Foreign Affairs Committee on the draft contract of objectives and means (COM) between the State and the Agency for French Education Abroad.

On January 17, 2022, he presented a motion for a resolution inviting the French National Assembly to solemnly condemn the illegitimate regime of Alexander Lukashenko. This text invites the deputies to condemn the repression, the acts of torture of the regime and the hijacking of the Ryanair plane in May 2021. It also demands the release of more than 1000 political prisoners and denounces the use of migrants as a weapon of destabilization of the European Union. It demands the holding of new elections under the aegis of the OSCE and provides for the creation of a study group between French parliamentarians and representatives of democratic Belarus in exile. Its resolution was adopted unanimously.

=== European Democratic Party, 2021–present ===
In May 2021, Petit was appointed deputy secretary general of the European Democratic Party.

== Summary of mandates ==
- Member of Parliament for the Seventh constituency for French residents overseas (Germany, Central Europe and the Balkans) in the 15th legislature

== Current positions at the National Assembly ==
- Member of the Foreign Affairs Committee
- Member of the Bureau of the Franco-German Parliamentary Assembly
- President of the France-Poland friendship group
- Vice-president of the France-Germany friendship group
- Vice-president of the French delegation to the Parliamentary Assembly of the Council of Europe
- Member of the French delegation to the Parliamentary Assembly of the Organization for Security and Cooperation in Europe
