= Daphna Poznanski-Benhamou =

French politician

Daphna Poznanski-Benhamou (born 3 June 1950) is a French politician who represented the Eighth constituency for French residents overseas on the National Assembly from 2012 to 2013.

== Early life ==
She was born in Oran in Algeria, and fled to Marseille with her mother after the Algerian War.
