= First French legislative constituency for citizens abroad =

Constituency of the French Fifth Republic

1st French legislative constituency for citizens abroad
- inline Constituency of the National Assembly of France

- Deputy: Roland Lescure; RE
- Department: None (citizens abroad)
- Cantons: None
- Registered voters: 265,898 (2024)

The first French legislative constituency for citizens abroad (French: Première circonscription des Français établis hors de France) is one of eleven constituencies representing French people living outside France. It was created by the 2010 redistricting of French legislative constituencies and elects, since 2012, one representative to the National Assembly.

It represents all French citizens living in Canada and the United States. It is the most populous constituency of its kind, containing 265,898 registered French voters as of 2024.

== Area represented ==
The first constituency for citizens abroad encompasses the following countries and French consular constituencies:

- Canada (79,328 French registered)
  - 1st voting constituency: consular constituencies of Ottawa, Toronto, and Vancouver.
  - 2nd voting constituency: consular constituencies of Moncton, Halifax, Montréal, and Québec.
- United States (122,686 French registered)
  - 1st voting constituency: consular constituencies of Atlanta, Boston, Miami, New York City, and Washington, D.C.
  - 2nd voting constituency: consular constituencies of Chicago.
  - 3rd voting constituency: consular constituencies of Houston and New Orleans.
  - 4th voting constituency: consular constituencies of Los Angeles and San Francisco.

== Deputy ==
Election	Name	Party
2012	Corinne Narassiguin	PS
2013	Frédéric Lefebvre	UMP
2017	Roland Lescure	LREM
2022	Roland Lescure	LREM
2022	Christopher Weissberg	LREM
2024	Roland Lescure	RE

== National Assembly elections ==
=== 2024 ===
Candidate	Party	Alliance	First round		Second round	
Candidate	Party	Alliance	Votes	%	Votes	%
Roland Lescure	RE	Ensemble	36,363	38.84	50,333	54.25
Oussama Laraichi	LÉ	NFP	33,822	36.12	42,439	45.75
Jennifer Adam	RN		10,018	10.70		
Olivier Piton	LR	UDC	4,856	5.19		
Véronique Jackson	DVC		4,643	4.96		
Elias Forneris	DVD		1,414	1.51		
Alexandra Pourchet	REC		1,357	1.45		
Greg Lacoste	DIV		1,090	1.16		
Paloma Ladam	DVG		67	0.07		
Valid votes			93,630	100.00	92,772	100.00
Blank votes			1,039	0.39	4,958	5.07
Null votes			90	0.03	142	0.15
Turnout			94,759	35.63	97,872	34.89
Abstentions			171,173	64.37	168,026	63.19
Registered voters			265,932		265,898	
Result			RE HOLD			

=== 2022 ===
Legislative Election 2022: 1st constituency for French citizens abroad
Party	Candidate	Votes	%	±%
LREM (Ensemble)	Roland Lescure	18,236	35.88	-21.65
LFI (NUPÉS)	Florence Roger	16,993	33.43	+12.81
DVD	Gérard Michon	5,439	10.70	N/A
DVD	Franck Bondrille	2,699	5.31	N/A
REC	Alain Ouelhadj	2,620	5.15	N/A
LC (UDC)	Patrick Caraco	2,381	4.68	−9.85
RN	Jennifer Adam	1,013	1.99	−0.03
Others	N/A	1,448	-	−
Turnout		50,828	21.32	+2.68
2nd round result
LREM (Ensemble)	Roland Lescure	30,268	55.63	-24.10
LFI (NUPÉS)	Florence Roger	24,145	44.37	N/A
Turnout		54,413	23.42	+10.35
LREM hold				

=== 2017 ===
Candidate	Label	First round		Second round	
Candidate	Label	Votes	%	Votes	%
Roland Lescure	REM	21,286	57.53	19,650	79.73
Frédéric Lefebvre	LR	5,377	14.53	4,995	20.27
Clémentine Langlois	FI	3,333	9.01		
Yan Chantrel	PS	3,124	8.44		
Jocelyne Le Boulicaut	ECO	1,073	2.90		
Damien Regnard	DVD	858	2.32		
Denis Franceskin	FN	748	2.02		
Christine Agathon-Burton	DIV	286	0.77		
David Lawson	DIV	170	0.46		
Fanny Etter	DIV	146	0.39		
Vincent Boileau-Autin	DVG	145	0.39		
David Sanchez David	DVG	144	0.39		
Laure Pascarel	DVG	107	0.29		
Julie Morel	PCF	99	0.27		
Arnaud Dumas de Rauly	DIV	72	0.19		
Élise Desaulniers	DIV	26	0.07		
Florent Fernandez	DIV	3	0.01		
Balie Topla	DIV	0	0.00		
Votes		36,997	100.00	24,645	100.00
Valid votes		36,997	99.16	24,645	94.22
Blank votes		58	0.16	1,158	4.43
Null votes		254	0.68	354	1.35
Turnout		37,309	18.64	26,157	13.07
Abstentions		162,896	81.36	174,022	86.93
Registered voters		200,205		200,179	
Source: Ministry of the Interior

=== 2013 by-election ===
Following the invalidation of the 2012 election, a by-election was held on May 25 and June 8, 2013.

==== Candidates ====
The list of candidates was officially released on May 6, 2013, with twelve candidates:

The Socialist Party was represented by Franck Scemama who lived in France. His deputy was Annie Michel.

The Union for a Popular Movement was represented once again by Frédéric Lefebvre. His deputy was Olivier Piton.

Europe Ecology – The Greens was represented by Cyrille Giraud who had been deputy to Narassiguin in the previous election. His deputy was Emmanuelle Garcia-Guillen.

The Left Front was represented once again by Céline Clément. Her deputy was Jean-Baptiste Plouhinec.

The Democratic Movement was represented by Nicolas Druet who lived in Montreal. His deputy was Martine Volard.

The Union of Democrats and Independents was represented by Louis Giscard d'Estaing who lived in Chamalières, France. His deputy was Séverine Boitier.

The Rally of French Citizens Abroad (Rassemblement des Français de l’étranger) was represented by Damien Regnard who lived in New Orleans. His deputy was Virginie Beaudet.

The National Front was represented by Thierry Franck Fautre who lived in Florida. His deputy was Sylvie Verez.

The Pirate Party was represented by Véronique Vermorel who lived in Boston. Her deputy was Mathieu Chambefort.

Solidarity and Progress was represented once again by Karel Vereycken.

Nicolas Rousseaux was an independent candidate who lived in France. His deputy was Raphaël Rousseaux.

Pauline Czartoryska was an independent candidate who lived in France and previously worked in Maryland. Her deputy was Emmanuèle Pillard.

==== Results ====
Legislative Election 2013: residents abroad 1 - 2nd round
Party	Candidate	Votes	%	±%
UMP	Frédéric Lefebvre	10,937	53.72	−
PS	Franck Scemama	9,423	46.28	−
Turnout		20,360	13.89	−
UMP win (new seat)				

Legislative Election 2013: residents abroad 1 - 1st round
Party	Candidate	Votes	%	±%
UMP	Frédéric Lefebvre	5,863	29.15	−
PS	Franck Scemama	5,024	24.98	−
DVD	Damien Regnard	2,548	12.67	−
UDI	Louis Giscard d'Estaing	1,735	8.63	−
EELV	Cyrille Giraud	1,486	7.39	−
MoDem	Nicolas Druet	1,208	6.01	−
FG	Céline Clément	835	4.15	−
FN	Thierry Franck Fautre	751	3.73	−
PP	Véronique Vermorel	502	2.50	−
Independent	Pauline Czartoryska	55	0.27	−
Independent	Nicolas Rousseaux	53		NA
SP	Karel Vereycken	50	0.25	−
Turnout		20,110	13.46	−

=== 2012 ===
==== Candidates ====
The list of candidates was officially finalised on 14 May. There were eighteen candidates:

The Union for a Popular Movement chose Finance Minister Christine Lagarde (who had never been a member of Parliament) as its candidate in April 2011. Lagarde, however, subsequently became Managing Director of the International Monetary Fund, and in November the party chose Frédéric Lefebvre, secretary of state for commerce, to replace her as candidate.

The Socialist Party chose Corinne Narassiguin, a resident of New York City. Her deputy (suppléant) was originally Yves Alavo, a resident of Montreal. Europe Écologie–The Greens had chosen Rémi Piet, with Sabrina Feddal as his deputy (suppléante). Piet, a resident of Miami, teaches international relations at the University of Miami. In January 2012, Europe Écologie–The Greens and the Socialist Party merged their efforts to create a new ticket featuring Corinne Narassiguin (Socialist) and Cyrille Giraud (EELV), a resident of Montreal.

The Democratic Movement chose Carole Granade. A resident of San Francisco, she was a former director of the city's French American Chamber of Commerce.

The Left Front, which includes the French Communist Party, chose Céline Clément, a senior lecturer in psychology at the University of Strasbourg. She had several years' experience working in Quebec, and a Canadian partner. Her deputy (suppléant) was Thomas Collombat, a professor of Quebec Studies at Western Washington University.

The National Front chose Claire Savreux.

The centre-right Radical Party and the centrist Republican, Ecologist and Social Alliance jointly chose Philippe Manteau as their candidate. He was also endorsed by the Liberal Democratic Party. Aurélia Palvel-Marmont was his deputy (suppléante).

The centre-left Radical Party of the Left chose Stéphanie Bowring, a long-term resident of Saint-Pierre-et-Miquelon, and a dual citizen of France and Canada. Jean Lachaud was her deputy (suppléant).

The Pirate Party chose Raphaël Clayette, with Olivier Henebelle as his deputy (suppléant).

Solidarity and Progress, the French branch of the LaRouche movement, was represented by Karel Vereycken, with Dominique Revault-D'Allonnes as his deputy. Vereycken described himself as a friend of Jacques Cheminade and Lyndon LaRouche.

Julien Balkany, a resident of New York City and a member of the Union for a Popular Movement, stood as a dissident candidate, having failed to obtain the party's endorsement. François Lubrina was his deputy (suppléant).

Gérard Michon, a resident of the United States for 31 years who was serving his fourth mandate at the Assembly of French Citizens Abroad, for the constituency including San Francisco, stood as an independent candidate. Despite being a member of the Union for a Popular Movement, he too stood against the party's endorsed candidate. Marc Cormier was his deputy (suppléant).

Antoine Treuille, a businessman, president of the French-American Foundation, and long-term resident of the United States, stood as an independent right-wing candidate. If elected, he said he would sit with the Union for a Popular Movement.

Christophe Navel was an independent candidate, presenting himself as neither left nor right. Matthieu Deborde was his deputy (suppléant).

Mike Remondeau was an independent candidate. A 31-year-old resident of Tampa, Florida, he was studying for a master's degree in political sciences. He called his political movement the "Circle of North Americans" (Cercle des Nord-Américains), and stood on a platform of "ideological laïcité", and a common cultural identity for French residents in North America. Christian Routier was his deputy.

Emile Servan-Schreiber, with Christian Déséglise as his deputy, was an "independent centre-right" candidate.

The other independent candidates were: Louis Le Guyader (with Claire Le Guyader as his deputy); Jean-Michel Vernochet (with Lieu Nguyen as his deputy); and Rob Temene (with Betty Millet as his deputy).

==== Campaign ====
Due in part to the sheer size of the constituency, certain candidates barely campaigned at all, while others "made every effort to travel around" the United States and Canada and "mobilise their scattered voters". Los Angeles, with a sizable French expatriate population, was a focal point for some. Among issues of concern to voters were education (access to French schools for their children) and retirement pensions.

On 23 May, France 24 organised a televised debate in New York City for the eight candidates it deemed "active" in terms of their campaign : Corinne Narassiguin (Socialist), Frédéric Lefebvre (UMP) Carole Granade (MoDem), Philippe Manteau (ARES), Julien Balkany (dissident UMP), Gérard Michon (dissident UMP), Antoine Treuille (misc. right), and Emile Servan-Schreiber (misc. right). Seven of the invited candidates took part; Lefebvre indicated he did not wish to.

==== Results ====
Turnout in the first round was low: 22.5% in Canada and 18.9% in the United States. With the mainstream right strongly divided (four dissident candidates standing against the UMP-endorsed candidate), Socialist Corinne Narassiguin obtained a comfortable lead in the first round, in both countries of the constituency.

In the second round, Narassiguin won by a comfortable margin, in what was described as an "incredible" win for the left. The constituency had been deemed a safe seat for the right. Commentators in Libération pointed to Narassiguin's strong and active campaign, and suggested that rightwing voters had rejected UMP candidate Frédéric Lefebvre, who spoke little English and was perceived as knowing little about North America.

Legislative Election 2012: residents abroad 1 - 2nd round
Party	Candidate	Votes	%	±%
PS	Corinne Narassiguin	15,782	54.01	−
UMP	Frédéric Lefebvre	13,441	45.99	−
Turnout		29,869	19.07	−
Void election result		Swing	-	

Legislative Election 2012: residents abroad 1 - 1st round
Party	Candidate	Votes	%	±%
PS	Corinne Narassiguin	12 529	39.65	−
UMP	Frédéric Lefebvre	6 977	22.08	−
DVD	Emile Servan-Schreiber	2 115	6.69	−
DVD	Julien Balkany	2 089	6.61	−
DVD	Antoine Treuille	1 611	5.10	−
MoDem	Carole Granade	1 561	4.94	−
FN	Claire Savreux	1 355	4.29	−
FG	Céline Clément	901	2.85	−
DVD	Gérard Michon	705	2.23	−
Radical	Philippe Manteau	447	1.41	−
PP	Raphaël Clayette	409	1.29	−
Independent	Christophe Navel	403	1.28	−
PRG	Stéphanie Bowring	328	1.04	−
SP	Karel Vereycken	119	0.38	−
Independent	Rob Temene	17	0.05	−
Independent	Jean-Michel Vernochet	17	0.05	−
Independent	Louis Le Guyader	10	0.03	−
Independent	Mike Remondeau	6	0.02	−
Turnout		31 958	20.4	−

==== Subsequent invalidation ====
In February 2013, the election of Corinne Narassiguin was annulled by the Constitutional Council, due to irregularities in the funding of her electoral campaigns. She was barred from standing for public office for a period of one year. Defeated candidates Antoine Treuille and Emile Servan-Schreiber were also barred from standing for public office for a year, for the same reason.

== Presidential elections ==
=== 2017 ===
Summary of the French presidential election results in the 1st citizens abroad constituency
Candidate	Party		1st round		2nd round	
Candidate	Party		Votes	%	Votes	%
Emmanuel Macron	En Marche!	EM	36,905	45.17%	77,625	91.08%
François Fillon	The Republicans	LR	16,980	21.25%		
Jean-Luc Mélenchon	La France insoumise	FI	13,646	17.08%		
Benoît Hamon	Socialist Party	PS	5,668	7.08%		
Marine Le Pen	National Front	FN	4,790	5.99%	7,603	8.92%
Nicolas Dupont-Aignan	Debout la France	DLF	1,130	1.41%		
François Asselineau	Popular Republican Union	UPR	691	0.86%		
Philippe Poutou	New Anticapitalist Party	NPA	369	0.46%		
Jean Lassalle	Résistons!		279	0.35%		
Nathalie Arthaud	Lutte Ouvrière	LO	141	0.18%		
Jacques Cheminade	Solidarity and Progress	S&P	122	0.15%		
Total			80,721	100%	85,228	100%

=== 2012 ===
French president election: citizens abroad 1 - 2nd round
Party	Candidate	Votes	%	±%
PS	François Hollande		46.37	+2.52
UMP	Nicolas Sarkozy		53.63	−2.52

=== 2007 ===
French president election: citizens abroad 1 - 2nd round
Party	Candidate	Votes	%	±%
PS	Ségolène Royal	20,523	43.85	−
UMP	Nicolas Sarkozy	26,275	56.15	−

== Assembly of French citizens abroad ==
The first constituency for French residents abroad encompasses six voting constituencies for the assembly of French citizens abroad.

- Canada
  - 1st voting constituency: consular constituencies of Ottawa, Toronto and Vancouver.
  - 2nd voting constituency: consular constituencies of Moncton, Halifax, Montréal and Québec.
- United States
  - 1st voting constituency: consular constituencies of Atlanta, Boston, Miami, New York City and Washington.
  - 2nd voting constituency: consular constituencies of Chicago.
  - 3rd voting constituency: consular constituencies of Houston and La Nouvelle-Orléans.
  - 4th voting constituency: consular constituencies of Los Angeles and San Francisco.

=== 2009 election ===
Constituency	Region	Number of seats	Election results
First	Canada	Five	3 RFE, 2 ADFE
Second	Canada	Three	2 UDIL, 1 ADFE
First	United States	Five	2 ADFE, 2 UDIL, 1 RFE
Second	United States	One	1 ADFE
Third	United States	One	1 RFE
Fourth	United States	Four	2 UMP, 1 ADFE, 1 unaffiliated

== Canadian protest ==
In September 2011, the Canadian Department of Foreign Affairs stated that it would not accept the inclusion of Canada into an electoral constituency of any foreign state. It explained that it was concerned an elected representative of French residents to the French National Assembly might be perceived as a representative of Canada, thus undermining the perception of Canadian sovereignty. In practice, however, officials admitted they could not prevent French residents from voting. (Canada also stated it could not accept its inclusion in similar overseas constituencies established by Tunisia and Italy, stating that Tunisians in Canada would be forbidden from electing a representative, and demanding that Italy abolish its overseas constituency which includes Canada.)

The French Foreign Affairs Ministry stated in January 2012 that French residents in Canada would indeed be able to elect a representative for the French communities of North America, even as the Canadian Foreign Affairs Ministry reiterated that this was not acceptable. Le Monde wrote that there would probably be a "de facto compromise", whereby Canada would tacitly recognise the diplomatic inviolability of French consulates where the voting would take place. This was what had happened for the election of a Tunisian constituent assembly in October 2011, where Canada had objected to the existence of "international districts" for the Tunisian legislature, but had done nothing in practice to prevent Tunisians residents in Canada from electing a representative.
