= List of ambassadors of France to Algeria =

The following is a list of ambassadors of France to Algeria since Algerian independence in 1962. All these diplomats technically have the title of Ambassadeur, Haut Représentant (Ambassador, High Representative).

Start of term	Ambassador, High Representative
5 July 1962	Jean-Marcel Jeanneney
18 January 1963	Georges Gorse
17 May 1967	Bruno de Leusse
16 November 1968	Jean Basdevant
15 November 1971	Jean Soutou
14 Avril 1975	Guy De Commines De Marsilly
27 August 1975	Jean-Marie Merillon
23 December 1981	Guy Georgy
11 January 1984	François Scheer
25 February 1986	Bernard Bochet
22 December 1988	Jean Audibert
5 August 1992	Bernard Kessedjian
29 December 1994	Michel Lévêque
29 July 1997	Alfred Sieffer-Gaillardin
10 April 2000	Hubert Colin de Verdière
10 August 2002	Daniel Bernard
27 June 2004	Hubert Colin de Verdière
12 November 2007	Bernard Bajolet
21 August 2008	Xavier Driencourt
4 May 2012	André Parant
1 August 2014	Bernard Émié
2017	Xavier Driencourt
2020	François Gouyette

== See also ==
- Algeria–France relations
- Embassy of France, Algiers
- Villa des Oliviers
