= Embassy of France, Tehran =

- Logo of the embassy.
- Location: Tehran
- Address: 64-66, Neauphle-le-Château St
- Coordinates: 35.69667°N 51.41028°E
- Opened: 1944
- Ambassador: Pierre Cochard
- Website: ir.diplomatie.gouv.fr

The Embassy of France, Tehran is located on Neauphle-le-Château Street, in Tehran. It also contains the consulate of France.

== History ==
The embassy is located on Neauphle-le Château Street (Persian: نوفل لو شاتو), referencing the Yveline commune where Ayatollah Khomeini lived during his exile in France in 1978 after being expelled from Iraq.

== Ambassadors of France in Iran ==
From	To	Ambassador
1944	1950	Pierre Lafond
1950	1955	François Coulet
1955	1956	Jacques-Émile Paris
1956	1961	Henri Roux
1961	1969	Renaud Sivan
1969	1972	François Charles-Roux
1972	1977	Robert de Souza (d)
1977	1977	René de Saint-Légier de La Saussaye
1977	1980	Raoul Delaye
1980	1982	Guy Georgy
1982	1984	José Paoli
1985	1987	Pierre Lafrance
1987	1988	Break in diplomatic relations
1988	1991	Christian Graeff
1991	1994	Hubert Colin de Verdière
1994	1998	Jean-Pierre Masset
1998	2001	Philippe de Suremain
2001	2005	François Nicoullaud
2005	2010	Bernard Poletti
2011	2016	Bruno Foucher
2016	2019	François Sénémaud
2019	2022	Philippe Thiébaud
2022	2025	Nicolas Roche
2025	present	Pierre Cochard

== Consulate ==
=== French community ===
As of 31 December 2016, 1,146 French nationals were registered with the consular authorities in Iran. The French community is primarily located in Tehran.

=== Electoral districts ===
Since the law of 22 July 2013 reformed the representation of French citizens living outside of France and the establishment of consular councils in the diplomatic missions, the French citizens in a district covering Afghanistan, Azerbaijan, Iran, Kazakhstan, Kyrgyzstan, Pakistan, Tajikistan, Turkmenistan and Uzbekistan elect 3 councillors for 6 years. Since June 2014, they are Armand Meimand, Yves Merer and Valérie Khan. These councillors have 3 roles:

1. They are the locally-based representatives of French citizens abroad;
2. They belong to one of the 15 districts who elect among themselves the members of the Assembly of French Citizens Abroad;
3. They become part of the electoral college which elects the senators representing French citizens living abroad.

For elections to the Assembly of French Citizens Abroad, Iran, since 2014, has been part of the electoral district of New Delhi, which also includes Afghanistan, Bangladesh, India (except for Pondicherry), the Maldives, Nepal, Pakistan and Sri Lanka, and account for 2 seats. Iran is currently part of the electoral district "Central Asia and Middle East" with its headquarters in Dubai and which elects 4 of its 23 consular councillors to serve as part of the 90 members of the assembly of French Citizens abroad.

For election of legislative deputies representing French citizens abroad, Iran is part of the 11th district.

== See also ==
- Ministry for Europe and Foreign Affairs (France)
- List of diplomatic missions of France
- France–Iran relations
