= 1994 Ain Allah attack =

Military offensive during 1994 Algeria civil war

- Part of Algerian Civil War
- Location: 36.75464°N 2.990684°E; Algiers, Algeria
- Date: 3 August 1994
- Target: French diplomatic staff
- Attack type: Shooting and shootout
- Deaths: 3 guards, 2 employees
- Injuries: 1 guard
- Perpetrator: Armed Islamic Group
- No. of participants: 4–7

The Ain Allah attack took place in a heavily guarded neighborhood in the southwest of Algiers on 3 August 1994 during the Algerian Civil War. The shootout occurred when at least four or seven gunmen dressed as police drove to a French guard post near a school and attempted to plant a car bomb in the neighbourhood which houses the French embassy in Algiers. Two French military guards were killed by surprise after being shot by automatic weapons. When gunmen tried to park a car with a bomb outside a building, a shootout broke out which resulted in the death of another guard and two French consular employees. Another guard was seriously injured and the bomb was safely defused. The Armed Islamic Group of Algeria claimed responsibility for the attack.
