= Christopher Weissberg =

French politician (born 1985)

Member of the National Assembly for the 1st constituency for French residents overseas
- Incumbent
- Assumed office 13 November 2025
- Preceded by: Roland Lescure
- In office 5 August 2022 – 9 June 2024
- Preceded by: Roland Lescure
- Succeeded by: Roland Lescure

Personal details
- Born: 26 November 1985 (age 40) Neuilly-sur-Seine, France
- Party: Renaissance

Christopher Weissberg (born 26 November 1985 in Neuilly-sur-Seine) is a French politician. Elected as the substitute of Roland Lescure in the 2022 legislative election, he became a member of the National Assembly for the First French legislative constituency for citizens abroad, which covers North America, on 5 August 2022. He returned to this seat on 13 November 2025.

== Professional career ==
Christopher Weissberg graduated from the Université de Montréal, the College of Europe as well as Sciences Po and began his professional career as chief of staff to the vice-president of the Regional Council of Île-de-France from 2012 to 2014.

In 2020, he was appointed as parliamentary advisor to Jean-Baptiste Lemoyne, Secretary of state then Minister delegate for tourism, the French living abroad and Francophonie.

He is also an entrepreneur who founded and managed the French restaurant he opened in Saranac Lake, New York in 2010.

== Political career ==
Based in Canada, he co-founded the Montreal committee of En Marche, of which he was lead coordinator from 2016 to 2017.

==== Member of the National Assembly, 16th legislature (2022–2024) ====
During the 2022 legislative election, he campaigned as the substitute of Roland Lescure, who was elected in the second round. He became a member of the National Assembly for the first constituency for French residents overseas (United States and Canada) one month after Lescure's appointment as Minister Delegate for Industry, and joined the Renaissance group.

A member of the Foreign Affairs Committee, he wrote a report on the enforcement of sentences handed down by the International Criminal Court and was co-rapporteur of an information mission on international sanctions policy. He also chaired the France–United States friendship group at the National Assembly and was president delegate of the French section of the France–Canada Interparliamentary Association.

==== Member of the National Assembly, 17th legislature (since 2025) ====
On 13 November 2025, he returned to the National Assembly as the substitute of Roland Lescure, who had been re-elected in the 2024 legislative election, one month after Lescure's appointment as Minister of the Economy in the second Lecornu government. He sits with the Ensemble pour la République group.

A member of the Foreign Affairs Committee, he again chairs the France–United States friendship group and is a member of the France–Canada and France–Quebec friendship groups. He is also co-rapporteur of an information mission on France's scientific and academic attractiveness in a context of global competition.

On 7 September 2026, he was appointed chair of the special committee examining the bill providing a comprehensive response to sexual and gender-based violence against women and children. The National Assembly adopted the text on 13 October 2026 by 503 votes to 0, and it was then sent to the Senate.
