= François Nicoullaud =

French diplomat and political analyst (1940–2021)

Ambassador of France to Iran
- In office 2001–2005
- Preceded by: Philippe de Suremain
- Succeeded by: Bernard Poletti

Ambassador of France to Hungary
- In office 1993–1997
- Preceded by: Pierre Brochand
- Succeeded by: Paul Poudade

General Consul of France in Bombay
- In office 1986–1988
- Preceded by: Jean Morawiecki
- Succeeded by: Gildas Le Lidec

Personal details
- Born: 24 July 1940 Suez Port, Kingdom of Egypt
- Died: 20 March 2021 (aged 80) Paris, France
- Party: ADFE

François Nicoullaud (French pronunciation: [fʁɑ̃swa nikulo]; 24 July 1940 – 20 March 2021) was a French diplomat and political analyst.

== Biography ==
Nicoullaud graduated from Sciences Po in 1961 and began working for the Ministry of Europe and Foreign Affairs. He then studied at the École nationale d'administration from 1970 to 1973. From 1964 to 2005, he served several diplomatic roles. He served as Second Secretary of the Embassy of France in Chile from 1973 to 1975 and was chief of staff of the French military governor general of Berlin from 1975 to 1978. He then served as the General Consul of France in Bombay from 1986 to 1988, Ambassador of France to Hungary from 1993 to 1997, and Ambassador of France to Iran from 2001 to 2005.

Alongside his diplomatic career, Nicoullaud chaired the board of directors of the Agency for French Education Abroad and the French Development Agency. He was one of the first chairmen of the association CFDT des Affaires étrangères. In 1985, he was one of the authors of "Manifeste pour un ministère des relations extérieures moderne et démocratique". He was an active member of the ADFE-Français du Monde, of which he served as president from 2005 to 2009. From 2005 to 2013, he served on the Assembly of French Citizens Abroad. From 2014 to 2018, he taught at Sciences Po's Paris School of International Affairs. He published a number of articles on Iran and its environment.

François Nicoullaud died in Paris on 20 March 2021, at the age of 80.

== Publications ==
- Le Turban et la Rose, journal inattendu d'un ambassadeur en Iran (2006)
