= Frédéric Lefebvre =

French politician

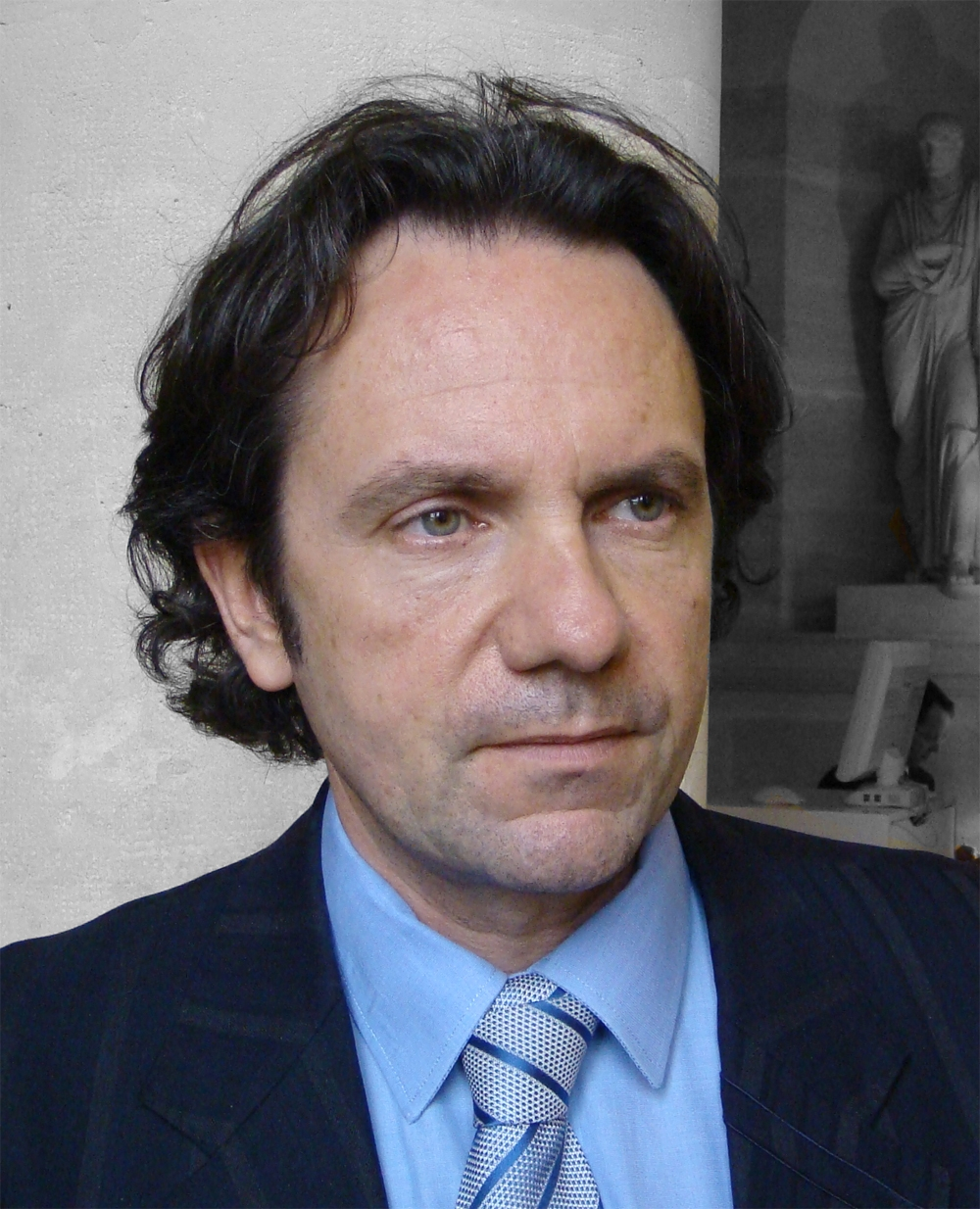

Member of the National Assembly for First Overseas Constituency
- In office 10 June 2013 – 20 June 2017
- Preceded by: Corinne Narassiguin
- Succeeded by: Roland Lescure

Secretary of State for Trade, Small and Medium Enterprises, Tourism, Services, Liberal professions and Consumption
- In office 14 November 2010 – 10 May 2012
- President: Nicolas Sarkozy
- Prime Minister: François Fillon
- Preceded by: Hervé Novelli
- Succeeded by: Benoît Hamon

Personal details
- Born: 14 October 1963 (age 62) Neuilly-sur-Seine, France
- Party: Renaissance (since 2019); Agir; The Republicans; UMP; RPR
- Spouse: Valérie Lefebvre
- Children: Quentin & Alix
- Profession: Lawyer

Frédéric Lefebvre (French pronunciation: [fʁedeʁik ləfɛvʁ]; born 14 October 1963 in Neuilly-sur-Seine) is a French politician who served as Secretary of State for Trade, Small and Medium Enterprises, Tourism, Services, Liberal professions and Consumption under the Minister of Economy, Finance and Industry, François Baroin, in the government of Prime Minister François Fillon. From 2008 to 2009 and from 2013 until 2017, he was a member of the National Assembly, representing the Hauts-de-Seine department. He is also the founder of l'Ame Nord, a non-profit organization dedicated to serve the interests of French residents living in the US and Canada.

== Political career ==
Lefebvre was first elected to the National Assembly in the 2007 elections. In parliament, he served on the Finance Committee from 2007 until 2009. In 2008, he introduced an amendment to President Nicolas Sarkozy's immigration law to allow illegal foreign employees to apply for work permits if their employers can show they are important to the economy.

Lefebvre was the UMP's candidate in the for First constituency for French residents overseas (for French expatriates in Canada and the United States) in the 2012 legislative election, but lost against Corinne Narassiguin, who received 54.01% of the votes. On 15 February 2013, the Constitutional Council canceled the election and said Corinne Narassiguin ineligible. He topped the first round of the early parliamentary elections, and after the second round, 9 June 2013, he was elected against the Socialist candidate, Frank Scemama, with 53.72% of the vote. He subsequently served on the Defence Committee from 2013 until 2017.

On 11 February 2014, Lefebvre was among the guests invited to the state dinner hosted by U.S. President Barack Obama in honor of President François Hollande at the White House.

Lefebvre was a candidate in the 2016 Republican presidential primary.

In the 2017 elections, Lefebvre lost his re-election race against Roland Lescure, the candidate of La République En Marche! (LREM); Lescure won 80 percent of the vote, to Lefebvre's 20 percent.

In November 2017, Lefebvre was among the co-founders of Agir and served as the party's vice-chairman. In 2019, however, he joined LREM.
