= Villa des Oliviers =

Residence of the French ambassador in Algiers

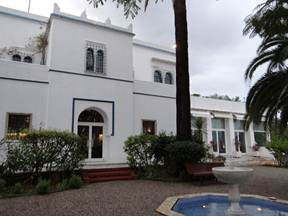
The Villa des Oliviers in Algiers

The Villa des Oliviers (French pronunciation: [villa dez‿ɔlivje]) is a historic Moorish Revival architecture building in El Biar near Algiers. Since 1963, it has been the residence of the French ambassador to Algeria.

== Name ==
The name of the villa does not come from olive trees (French: oliviers) but from the Olivier family which lived there for a quarter century after 1881. Even so, there are olive trees in the villa's garden. Depending on sources, they are described either as predating the villa's construction, or as planted after 1962 by a French ambassador from Provence.

== History ==
The villa was purchased in 1835 by Ms (Princess) de Mir. In 1838 it became the property of John Frédérik Schultze, consul of Sweden and Norway, and his wife Frances, who nicknamed it La Calorama (meaning "beautiful view" in Greek). It was bought by Victor Olivier in 1881.

Maxime Weygand, then the General Delegate in French Africa for Vichy France, stayed at the villa during a brief visit in Algiers in late 1940. It then became the Algiers residence of Alphonse Juin, who in November 1941 had succeeded Weygand as commander of the Vichy regime's military forces in North Africa. Juin was staying there during Operation Torch.

Charles de Gaulle established his residence in the villa in June 1943, immediately following his landing at Boufarik Airport on 30 May 1943. According to French ambassador Xavier Driencourt, De Gaulle had deliberately chosen the site for its relative remoteness from the city of Algiers and its multiple factions at the time. He established his office at the nearby Villa des Glycines. The villa remained De Gaulle's residence in Algiers until his final departure on 18 August 1944, when he relocated to liberated France.

In negotiations with the new independent Algerian government in 1963, ambassador Georges Gorse obtained that France would retain the Villa des Oliviers for the residence of its ambassador.

== See also ==
- Embassy of France, Algiers
- List of ambassadors of France to Algeria
- Kalorama (Washington, D.C.)
