= Lycée International Alexandre-Dumas =

- ثانوية الكسندر دوما الدولية
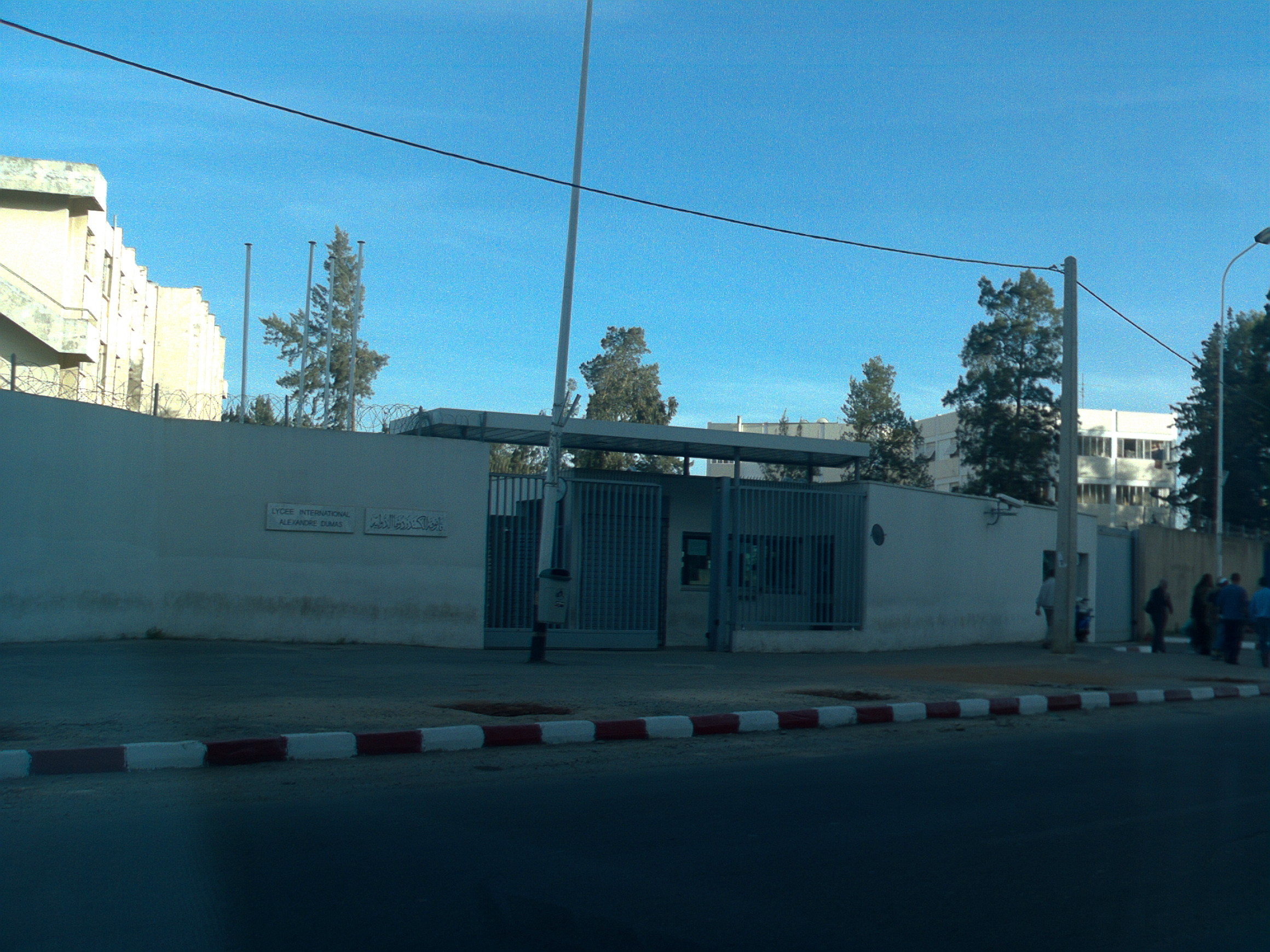

Location
- Chemin Arezki Mouri - Ben-Aknoun - Algérie; Algiers; Algeria
- Coordinates: 36.7632°N 3.0147°E

Information
- Type: French international school
- Opened: 2002
- Website: liad-alger.fr

The Lycée International Alexandre Dumas (LIAD; Arabic: ثانوية الكسندر دوما الدولية) is a French international school in Ben-Aknoun, Algiers, Algeria. It has two divisions: primaire (primary school) and collège-lycée (junior and senior high school).

It is directly operated by the Agency for French Education Abroad (AEFE), an agency of the French government.

A spin off of the school was inaugurated in the city of Oran on December 3, 2017. Another exists in Annaba.

== See also ==
- Algeria–France relations
