= Corinne Narassiguin =

French politician (born 1975)

- Corinne Narassiguin at the Paris Pride 2026

Senator for Seine-Saint-Denis
- Incumbent
- Assumed office 2 October 2023

Member of the National Assembly for the 1st constituency for French residents overseas
- In office 20 June 2012 – 15 February 2013
- Preceded by: Constituency created
- Succeeded by: Frédéric Lefebvre

Personal details
- Born: 7 March 1975 (age 51) Le Port, Réunion
- Party: Socialist Party (2000–present)
- Education: Télécom SudParis
- Occupation: Engineer

Corinne Narassiguin (born 7 March 1975) is a French politician who has served as a Senator for Seine-Saint-Denis since 2 October 2023. A member of the Socialist Party (PS), she previously represented the 1st constituency for French residents overseas (United States and Canada) in the National Assembly from 2012 to 2013.

Narassiguin was elected to the National Assembly in the 2012 legislative election with the support of Europe Ecology – The Greens (EELV). Her election was however nullified in early 2013 and she was forced to vacate her seat when the Constitutional Council ruled the election had been held improperly. She was barred from running for reelection. In the 2023 Senate election, she returned to a parliamentary role after she successfully led the PS–EELV list in Seine-Saint-Denis.

== Personal life ==
Corinne Narassiguin was born in Saint Paul, in the French overseas department of Réunion, into a family of left-leaning teachers. She graduated from Telecom & Management SudParis and earned a Master's degree in telecommunications from University College London. She has been a resident in the United States since 1999. She said her interest in politics grew during the 2000 US Elections. Before her election Corinne worked for a major US bank.

== Political life ==
Narassiguin joined the New York City branch of the Socialist Party and was its secretary from 2003 until 2009. In 2005 she was elected to the regional executive committee where she handled international affairs after co-authoring a paper about modernising the life of the party.

=== 2009 and 2010 Assembly of French Citizens Abroad Election ===
She was Christiane Ciccone's running mate in the 2009 Assembly of French Citizens Abroad election and was elected as the second candidate of the Socialist Party slate. However, another candidate who did not get elected sued to get the election invalidated. Christiane Ciccone and Corinne Narassiguin were reelected in 2010. She was once again elected in the subsequent re-run of the election. She later became one of the two vice-presidents of the Laws and Regulations Committee at the Assembly of French Citizens Abroad.

=== 2012 Legislative Election ===
She was the first declared candidate, having started campaigning in December 2010. In March 2012, she announced that some of her objectives were to encourage international mobility and to foster a debate over changes to the labor laws. The same month, she said her two main "themes" were education and social matters, advocating for the establishment of a consular social benefit based on the revenu de solidarité active and universal healthcare. She was elected on the second round with 54% of the votes. On February 15, 2013 her election was invalidated by France's highest constitutional court for accounting irregularities and she was banned from public office for 12 months.
