= Algeria–France relations =

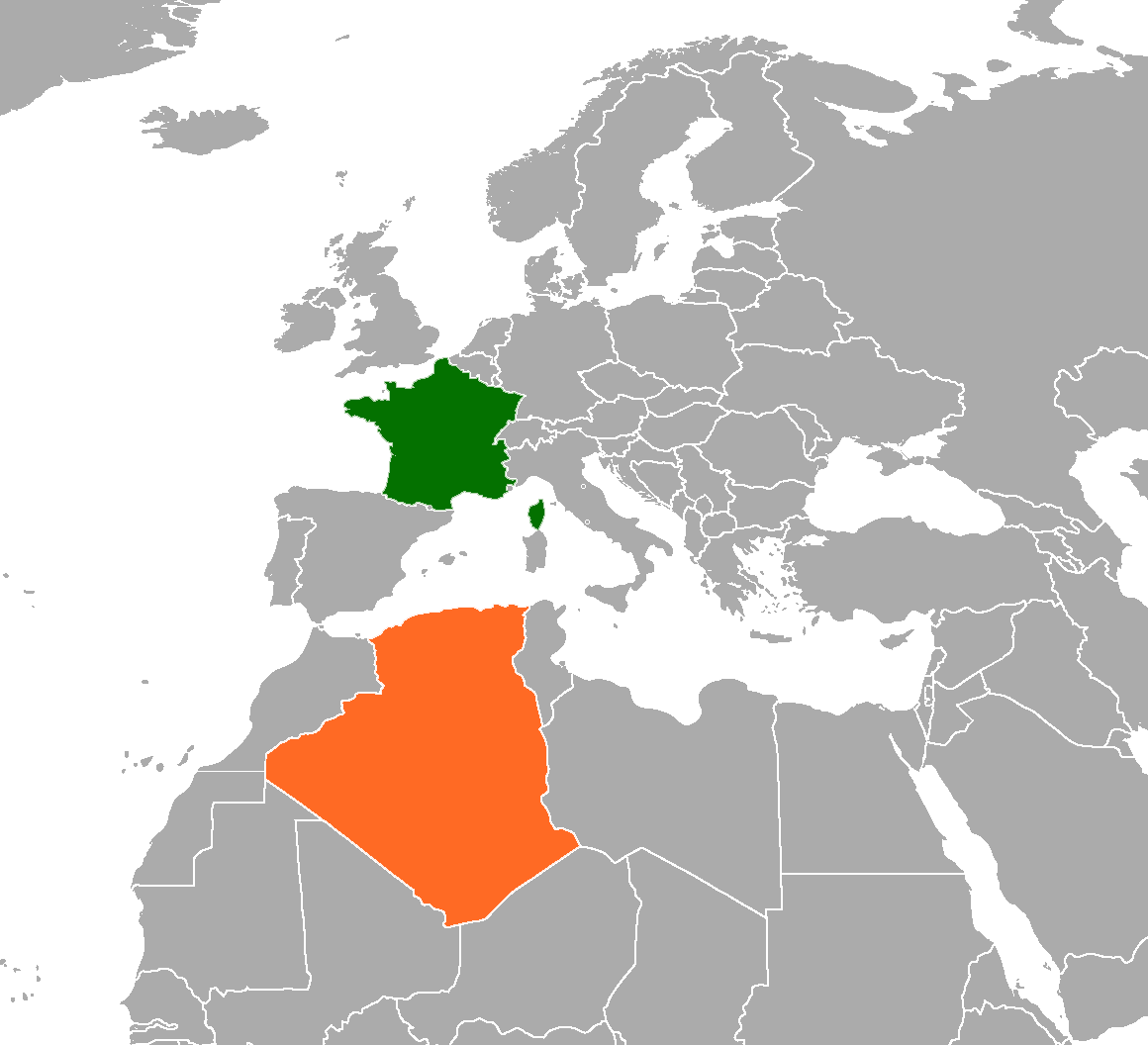
- France: Algeria

Diplomatic mission
- French embassy, Algiers: Algerian embassy, Paris

Relations between France and Algeria span more than five centuries. Through this period, there have been many changes within each of the nations, with consequent effects on their relations. Algeria was once part of the Ottoman Empire, and in the 19th century was conquered and colonized by France. It played an important role in both world wars.

Algeria achieved independence in the early 1960s following war with France. Issues of note in the countries' relations have included immigration from Algeria, Algerian nationalization of energy assets, and the legacy of French colonization.

== Historical relations ==
=== Early history ===
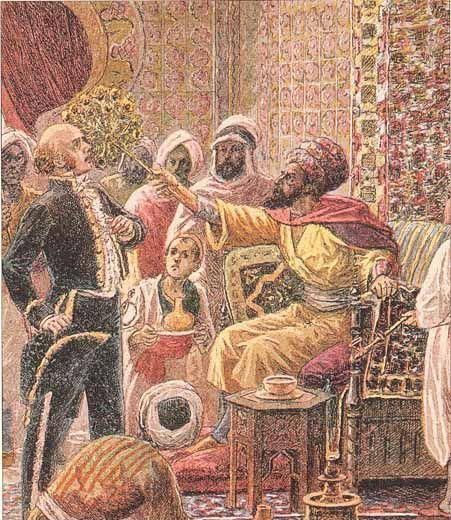
An image depicting the Fly Whisk Incident

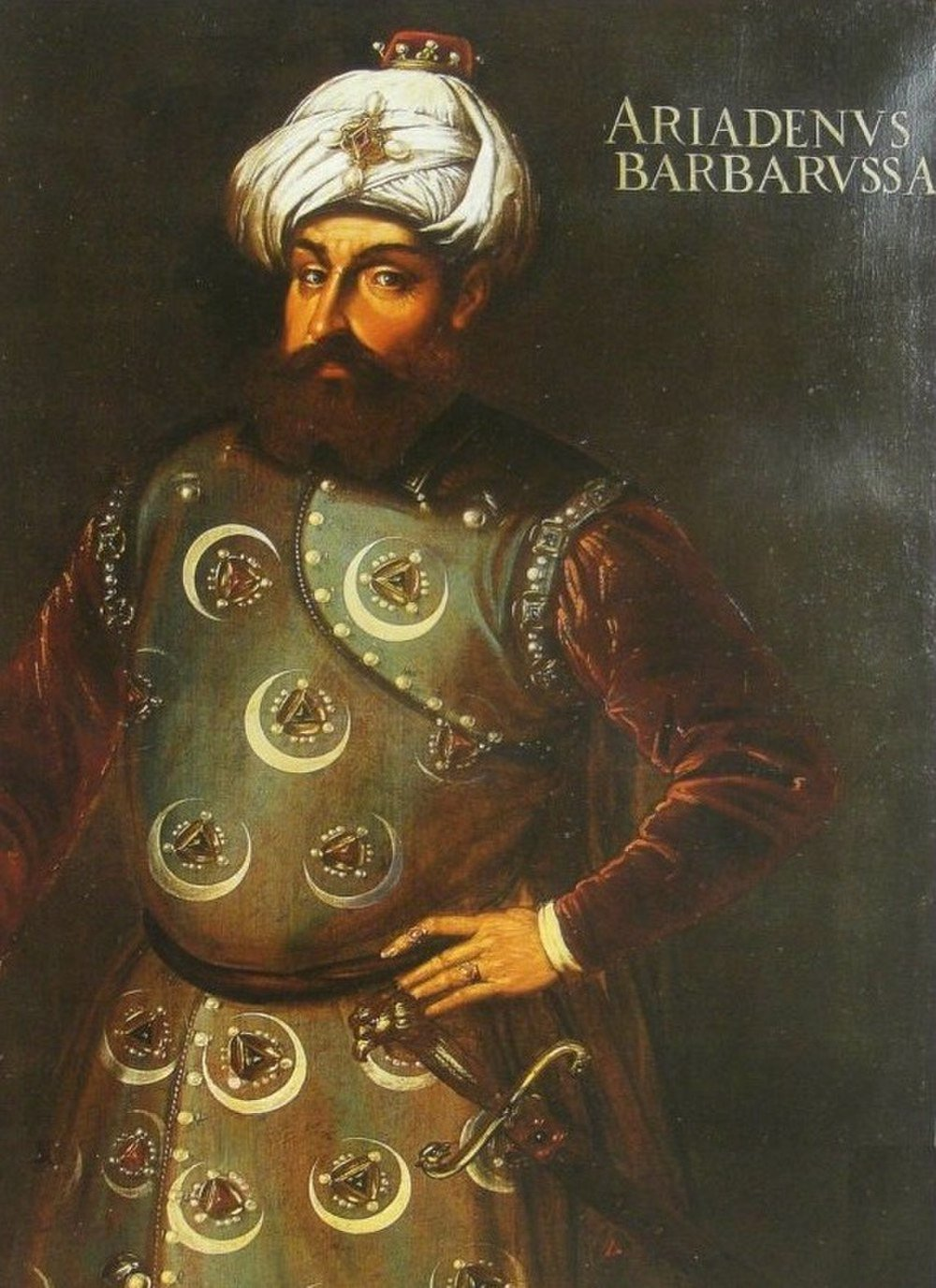
Hayreddin Barbarossa, ruler of Algiers, led an Ottoman embassy to France in 1533.

The first contact between the two nations began in 1526, when Algeria was part of the Ottoman Empire. Francis I of France and the Ottoman Emperor Suleiman the Magnificent had just agreed upon the Franco-Ottoman alliance, which initiated contact between France and the Barbary States of Northern Africa. These states were considered vassals for the Ottoman Empire; thus, were drawn into relations with France as a result of this alliance.

The Barbary slave trade and Barbary corsairs originating from the Regency of Algiers were a major problem throughout the centuries, leading to regular punitive expeditions by France (1661, 1665, 1682, 1683, 1688). French admiral Abraham Duquesne fought the Barbary corsairs in 1681 and bombarded Algiers between 1682 and 1683, to help Christian captives.

The French conquest of Algeria started after a rather peculiar event, in April 1827, when the Dey of Algiers supposedly struck the French consul with a fly whisk. Three years following this event, France began the invasion of Algeria. Between these three years, France unsuccessfully tried a variety of tactics in order to establish control in the region. All of them proved futile leading to a decision in 1830 to invade the country. The Algerians were quick to surrender following the landing of the French army on 5 July 1830. The last dey of Algiers, Husayn, was forced into exile as part of the agreement. However, one important Ottoman Algerian leader held onto power for several more years, but in general was quick to succumb to the French presence in the region. Due to the fact that Constantinople was a considerable distance away from Algiers, France easily stopped Ottoman influence in the region, and instead, asserted their own power.

=== French settlement of Algeria ===
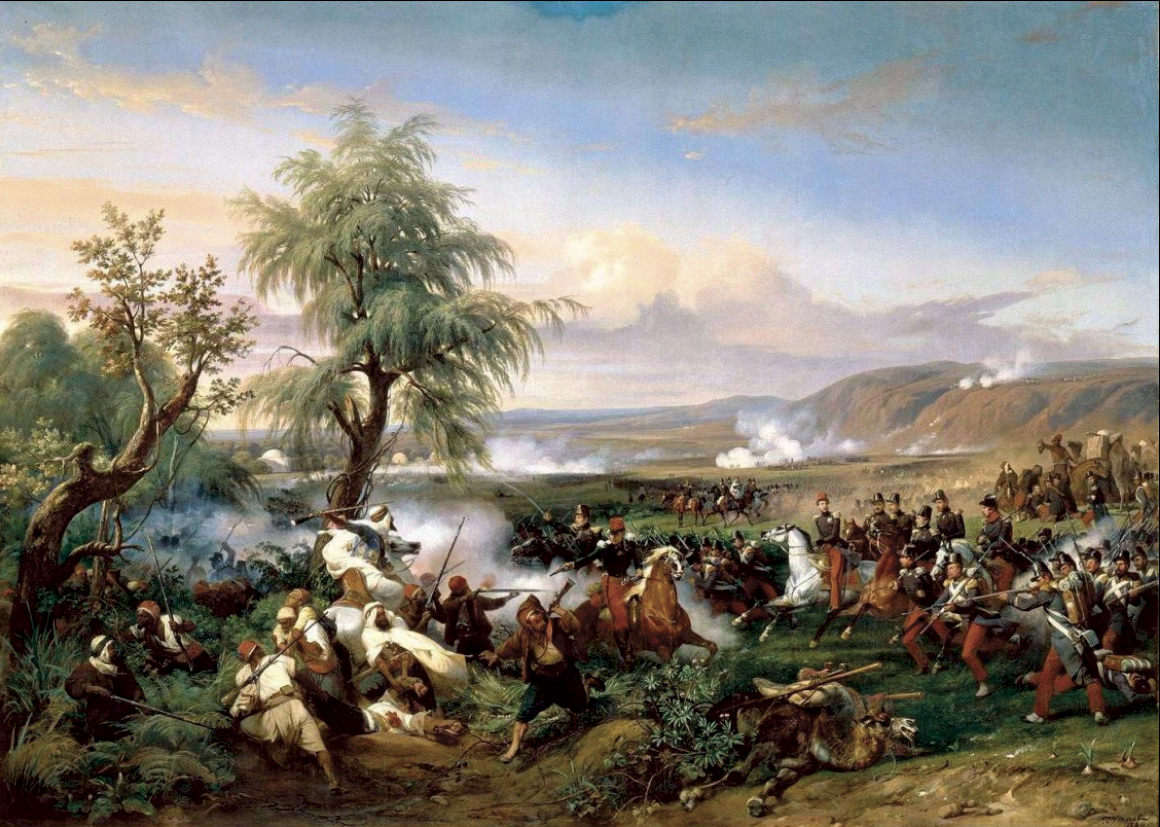
The Pacification of Algeria

French rule of Algeria was established during the years of 1830–1847, in which a groundwork was created in how the nation would be controlled. Before they officially became a colony of France, Algeria remained under largely military administration. The Algerians, excluding the French settlers, were subject to rule by military officers with detailed knowledge of local affairs and languages, but no interest in broader colonial matters. This meant that the officers often sided with the native Algerians instead of the French colonizers' demands. Algerians under a strict military rule were better represented than when the French began to exert their influence. As French occupation continued, French settlers began to colonize more of the region. While these actions caused alarm and tension between the natives and the settlers at first, the influence of French education and continued presence of European settlers eventually created a reluctant acceptance.

French settlers accumulated enough power to declare Algeria a French territory after the overthrow of the French monarchy and King Louis-Phillipe in 1848. The settlers, commonly called "Pieds-Noirs" or "Blackfeet", began to demand more acknowledgement of the French government and started enforcing French influence and forms of control over the Algerian precedents, even though they made up only ten percent of the population in Algeria. These changes were seen in the conversion of former Turkish provinces into departments based on a French model. Colonization advanced with renewed progress and excitement.

The overshadowing of Algerian government and customs by the French continued: responsibility for administration of Algeria was transferred from Algiers to a minister in Paris. Through the next couple of years and Napoleon III's reign, the French settlement of Algeria teetered between the control of the native Algerians and the French through actions such as the mentioned transfer of responsibility and the fight for dominant forms of government and society. Eventually, the slow build of European control led to the securing of settler domination after the fall of Napoleon III and the rise of the Third Republic in France.

=== World War II ===
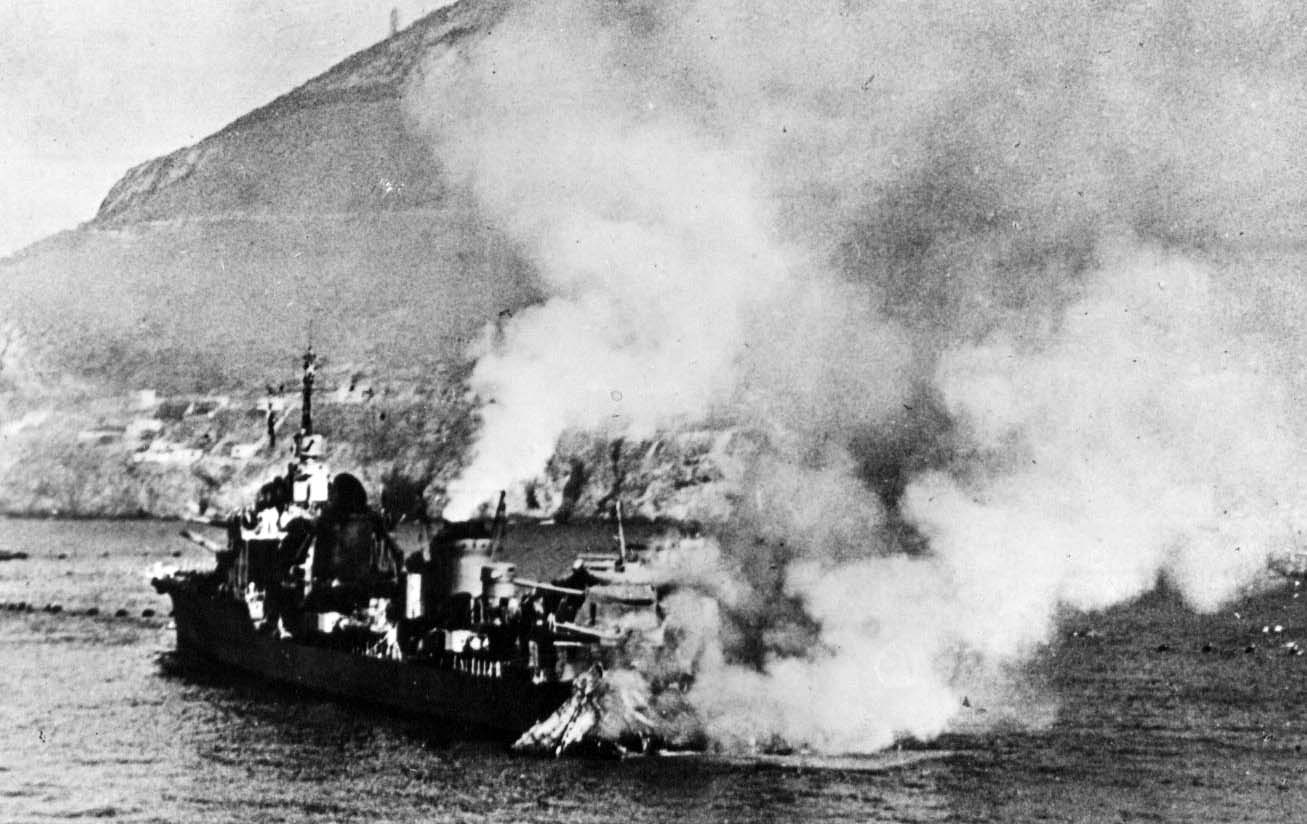
On 3 July 1940, the British Royal Navy attacked the French Navy's fleet at Mers El Kébir, killing more than 1,200 men.

During World War II, North Africa was the battleground for much of the European-based war. With the invasion of France by Germany in 1940, the Allied forces were quick to take control of the colonies once controlled by the French.

The Anglo-American occupation of North Africa began the start of modern-day Algeria. During this time, the occupational forces (both the Allied and the Axis powers) began delivering messages and promises of a "new world for formerly subject[ed] peoples". Promises of emancipation excited the Algerian people, as they would finally be able to form a sovereign nation. In December 1942, Ferhat Abbas drafted an Algerian Manifesto, and presented it to both the Allied and French authorities. This manifesto wanted recognition of an Algeria that was sovereign, and free of colonization. As a response, in 1943, French citizenship was given as an option to many North Africans. This, however was not enough to satisfy Algerians and an uprising soon followed.

On 8 May 1945, during celebrations to mark the end of World War II, an unorganized rising occurred in Setif, and 84 European settlers were killed. The French responded with brute force by regular military and territorial militia, suppressing the Algerian population, killing thousands of Algerians in retaliation. Opposition continued against the French, and the brute force used by the French continued. In total, casualty estimates range from 1,000 to 45,000 deaths, with many more wounded. Following the events of the past such as the Setif Massacre, French rule was introduced again.

=== Algerian War ===
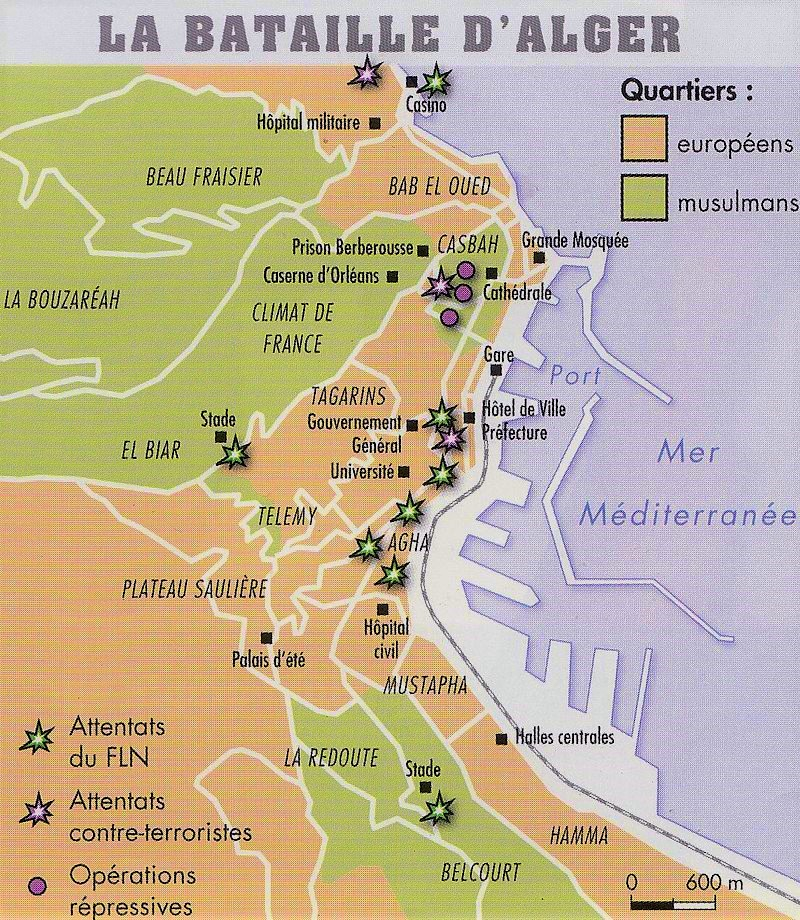
Battle of Algiers: Muslim quarters (green), European quarters (orange), terrorist attacks

For more than a century France maintained colonial rule in Algerian territory. This allowed exceptions to republican law, including Sharia laws applied by Islamic customary courts to Muslim women which gave women certain rights to property and inheritance which they did not have under French law. Discontent among the Muslim Algerians grew after the World Wars, in which the Algerians sustained many casualties. Algerian nationalists began efforts aimed at furthering equality by listing complaints in the Manifesto of the Algerian People, which requested equal representation under the state and access to citizenship, but no equality for all citizens to preserve Islamic precepts. The French response was to grant citizenship to 60,000 "meritorious" Muslims.

During a reform effort in 1947, the French created a bicameral legislature with one house for the French citizens and another for the Muslims but made a European's vote equal seven times a Muslim's vote. Paramilitary groups such as the Front de Libération nationale (FLN) appeared, claiming an Arabo-Islamic brotherhood and state. This led to the outbreak of a war for independence, the Algerian War, in 1954. From first armed operations of November 1954, 'Pieds-Noirs' civilians have always been targets for FLN, either by assassination, bombing bars and cinemas and mass massacres, torture and rapes in farms. At the onset of the war, the Pieds-noirs believed the French military would be able to overcome opposition. In May 1958 a demonstration for French Algeria, led by Pieds-Noirs but including many Muslims, occupied an Algerian government building. General Massu controlled the riot by forming a Committee of Public Safety demanding that his acquaintance Charles de Gaulle be named president of the French Fourth Republic, to prevent the "abandonment of Algeria".

This eventually led to the fall of the Republic. In response, the French Parliament voted 329 to 224 to place de Gaulle in power. Once de Gaulle assumed leadership, he attempted peace by visiting Algeria within three days of his appointment claiming "French Algeria!" but in September 1959 he planned a referendum for Algerian self-determination that passed overwhelmingly. Many French political and military leaders in Algeria viewed this as betrayal and formed the Organisation armée secrète (OAS) that had much support among 'Pieds-Noirs'.

This paramilitary group began attacking officials representing de Gaulle's authority, Muslims, and de Gaulle himself. The OAS was also accused of murders and bombings nullifying reconciliation opportunities between the communities, while 'Pieds-Noirs' themselves never believed such reconciliation possible as their community was targeted from the start. The opposition culminated in 1961 during the Algiers putsch of 1961, led by retired generals. After this failure, on 18 March 1962, de Gaulle and the FLN signed a cease-fire agreement, the Évian accords, and held a referendum. In July, Algerians voted 5,975,581 to 16,534 to become independent from France. This was an occasion for a massacre of 'Pieds-Noirs' in Oran by a suburban Muslim population. European people were shot, molested and brought to Petit-Lac slaughterhouse where they were tortured and executed.

== Political relations ==
Despite ambiguous sentiment in Algeria concerning its former colonial power, France has maintained a historically favored position in Algerian foreign relations. Algeria experienced a high level of dependency on France in the first years after the revolution and a conflicting desire to be free of that dependency. The already established trade links, the lack of experienced Algerian government officials, and the military presence provided for in the Évian Accords ending the War of Independence ensured the continuance of French influence. France supplied much-needed financial assistance, a steady supply of essential imports, and technical personnel.

This benevolent relationship was altered in the early Boumediène years when the Algerian government assumed control of French-owned petroleum extraction and pipeline interests and nationalized industrial and energy enterprises. French military units were almost immediately pulled out. France, although apparently willing to maintain cooperative relations, was overlooked as Algeria, eager to exploit its new independence, looked to other trade partners. Shortly afterward, Algerian interest in resuming French-Algerian relations resurfaced. Talks between Boumediène and the French government confirmed both countries' interest in restoring diplomatic relations. In 1974, Algeria's President Boumediène stated "Relation between France and Algeria may be good or bad, but in no way can they be trivial.", depicting this relationship. France wanted to preserve its privileged position in the strategically and economically important Algerian nation, and Algeria hoped to receive needed technical and financial assistance. French intervention in the Western Sahara against the Polisario and its lack of Algerian oil purchases, leading to a trade imbalance in the late 1970s strained relations and defeated efforts toward bilateral rapprochement. In 1983 Benjedid was the first Algerian leader to be invited to France on an official tour, but relations did not greatly improve.

Despite strained political relations, economic ties with France, particularly those related to oil and gas, have persisted throughout independent Algerian history. Nationalized Algerian gas companies, in attempting to equalize natural gas export prices with those of its neighbors, alienated French buyers in the late 1970s and early 1980s, however. Later gas agreements resulted in a vast growth of bilateral trade into the billions of dollars. Further disputes over natural gas pricing in the late 1980s led to a drastic drop in French-Algerian imports and exports. The former fell more than 10 billion French francs, the latter 12 billion French francs between 1985 and 1987. A new price accord in 1989 resurrected cooperative ties. The new agreement provided substantial French financial assistance to correct trade imbalances and guaranteed French purchasing commitments and Algerian oil and gas prices. French support for Benjedid's government throughout the difficult period in 1988 when the government appeared especially precarious and subsequent support for economic and political liberalization in Algeria expedited improved French-Algerian relations. Finally, rapprochement with Morocco, a number of joint economic ventures between France and Algeria, and the establishment of the UMA relaxed some of the remaining tensions.

One source of steady agitation has been the issue of Algerian emigration to France. French policies toward Algerian immigrants have been inconsistent, and French popular sentiment has generally been unfavorable toward its Arab population. The French government has vacillated between sweeping commitments to "codevelopment," involving extensive social networks for emigrant Algerian laborers, and support of strict regulations concerning work and study permits, random searches for legal papers, and expeditious deportation without appeal in the event of irregularities. North African communities in France remain relatively isolated, and chronic problems persist for Algerians trying to obtain housing, education, and employment. A number of racially motivated incidents occur each year between North African emigrants and French police and citizens.

Equally problematic has been Algeria's handling of the emigrant issue. The government has provided substantial educational, economic, and cultural assistance to the emigrant community but has been less consistent in defending emigrant workers' rights in France, frequently subordinating its own workers' interests to strategic diplomatic concerns in maintaining favorable relations with France. The rise of Islamism in Algeria and the subsequent crackdown on the Islamists by the government have had serious implications for both countries: record numbers of Algerian Islamists have fled to France, where their cultural dissimilarity as Arab Islamists is alien to the country.

In the early 1990s, nearly 20 percent of all Algerian exports and imports were destined for or originated from France. More than one million Algerians resided in France and there were numerous francophones in Algeria, creating a tremendous cultural overlap. French remained the language of instruction in most schools and the language used in more than two-thirds of all newspapers and periodicals and on numerous television programs. Algeria and France share a cultural background that transcends diplomatic manoeuvres and has persisted throughout periods of "disenchantment" and strained relations. Over time, however, the arabization of Algeria and the increasing polarization of society between the francophone elite and the Arab masses have mobilized anti-French sentiment. Support for the arabization of Algerian society—including the elimination of French as the second national language and emphasis on an arabized education curriculum—and the recent success of the FIS indicate a growing fervor in Algeria for asserting an independent national identity. Such an identity emphasizes its Arab and Islamic cultural tradition rather than its French colonial past. However, France's support for the military regime that assumed power in early 1992 indicates that the cooperative relations between the two countries remain strong.

In 2021, the French government determined to "drastically" reduce the number of visas issued to Algerian citizens (as well as Moroccans and Tunisians), arguing the lack of collaboration from those countries vis-à-vis deportations from France.

On 2 October 2021, Algeria decided to recall its ambassador in France for consultations. The Algerian government was reportedly offended by some remarks made by French president Emmanuel Macron towards Algeria, described by Macron as ruled under a "political-military system" and as having an "official history" which had been "totally re-written". A day after, the French armed forces reported that Algeria had banned French military flights from using the Algerian airspace.

On 8 December 2021, in an unannounced trip to Algiers, Foreign Minister Jean-Yves Le Drian held talks with President Abdelmadjid Tebboune with the aim of opening a route towards renewed dialogue between the countries. On 29 January 2022, Tebboune held a telephone conversation with Macron to strengthen bilateral relations. Macron invited Tebboune to the 6th European Union - African Union Summit on 17 and 18 February in Brussels. In April 2022, Tebboune congratulated Macron on his re-election as French president and invited him to Algeria. In August 2022, Macron visited Algeria to further repair broken relations between the two countries.

After a policeman killed a French Algerian teenager on 27 June 2023 during a road check in Nanterre, Algeria expressed "shock" and "dismay" before urging France to recall its "duty to protect".

The French Parliament began to examine a resolution from 7 December 2023, aimed at ending a secret agreement concluded in 1968 with Algeria by Charles de Gaulle on immigration, regulating the access of Algerians to the labor market and to social security in France.

On 30 July 2024, Algeria recalled its ambassador to France due to the latter's announcement of its support for the Moroccan autonomy plan for Western Sahara.

In December 2024, Algeria summoned the French ambassador for reprimand over accusations of provocations and hostile acts by the French DGSE.

On 15 April 2025, France expelled twelve Algerian diplomatic officials from the country after Algeria expelled twelve French officials the day prior over the arrest of an Algerian consular official in a kidnapping case. France also recalled its ambassador from Algiers.

On 7 August 2025, Algeria announced that it would end the free provision of real estate belonging to the Algerian state to the French embassy in Algeria. It also announced the termination of the 2013 bilateral agreement on reciprocal visa exemptions for holders of diplomatic passports.

On 24 December 2025, the People's National Assembly of Algeria unanimously passed a law declaring French colonization a crime, demanding an apology and reparations from France, and outlawing glorification of colonialism. The BBC said the vote reflected "increasingly strained diplomatic relations between the two countries, with some observers saying they are at their lowest" since Algerian independence.

- Education

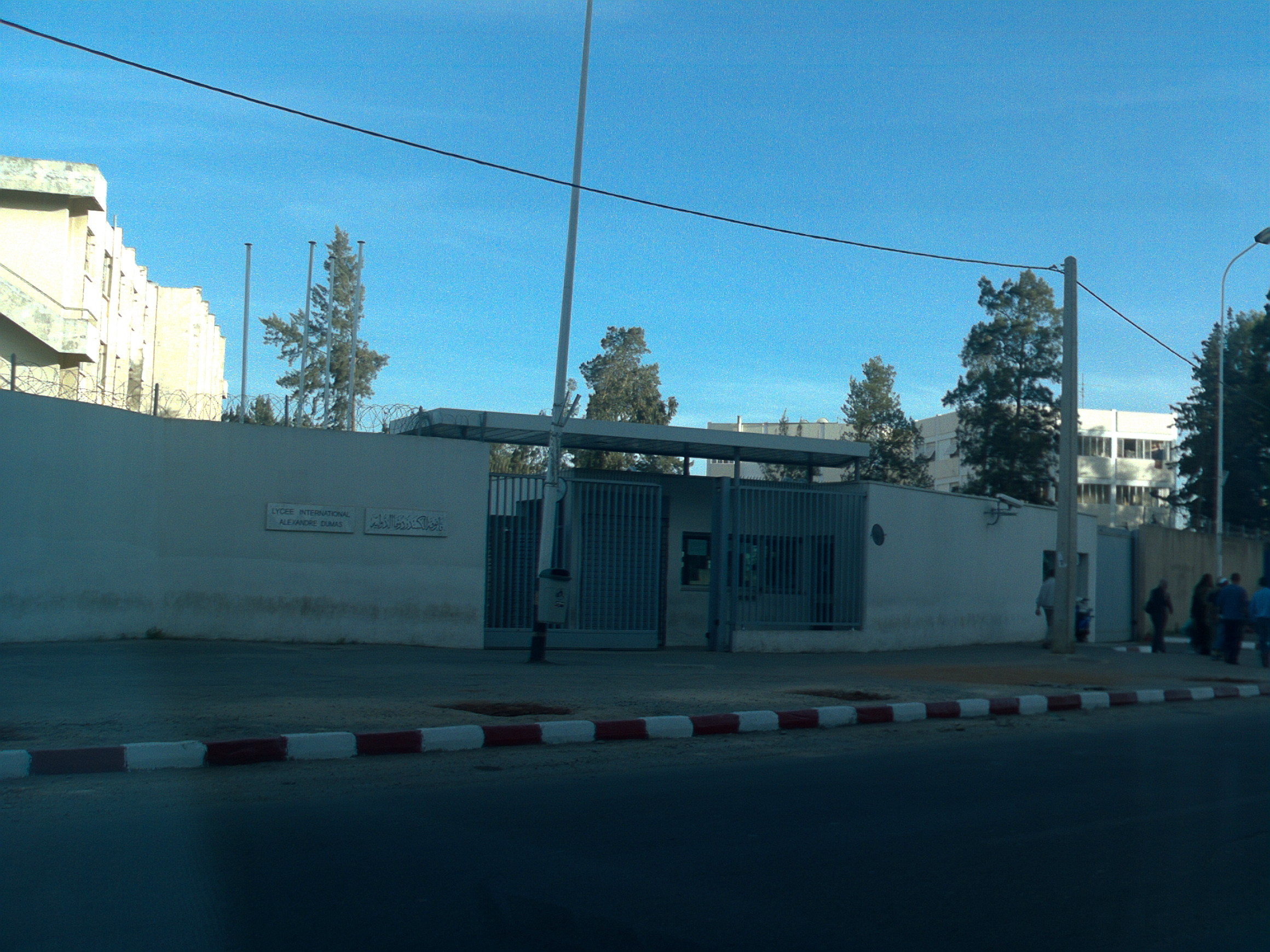
Lycée International Alexandre Dumas

Currently there are two French international schools in Algiers:

- Lycée International Alexandre Dumas
- Petite École d'Hydra

== Resident diplomatic missions ==
of Algeria in France

- Paris (Embassy and Consulate-General)
- Lille (Consulate-General)
- Lyon (Consulate-General)
- Marseille (Consulate-General)
- Strasbourg (Consulate-General)
- Besançon (Consulate)
- Bobigny (Consulate)
- Bordeaux (Consulate)
- Créteil (Consulate)
- Grenoble (Consulate)
- Metz (Consulate)
- Montpellier (Consulate)
- Nanterre (Consulate)
- Nantes (Consulate)
- Nice (Consulate)
- Pontoise (Consulate)
- Saint-Étienne (Consulate)
- Toulouse (Consulate)

of France in Algeria

- Algiers (Embassy)
- Annaba (Consulate-General)
- Oran (Consulate-General)

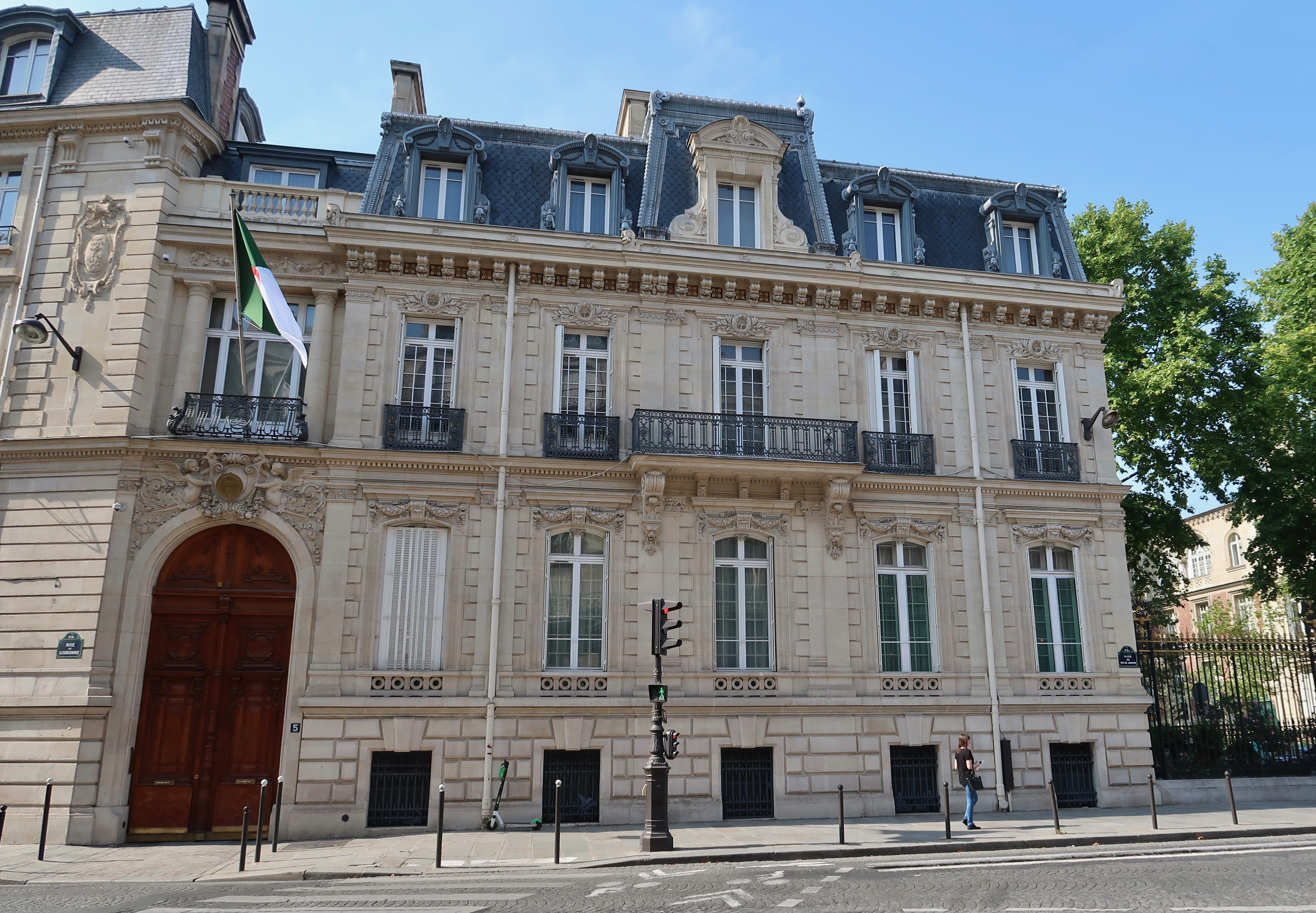
Embassy of Algeria in Paris

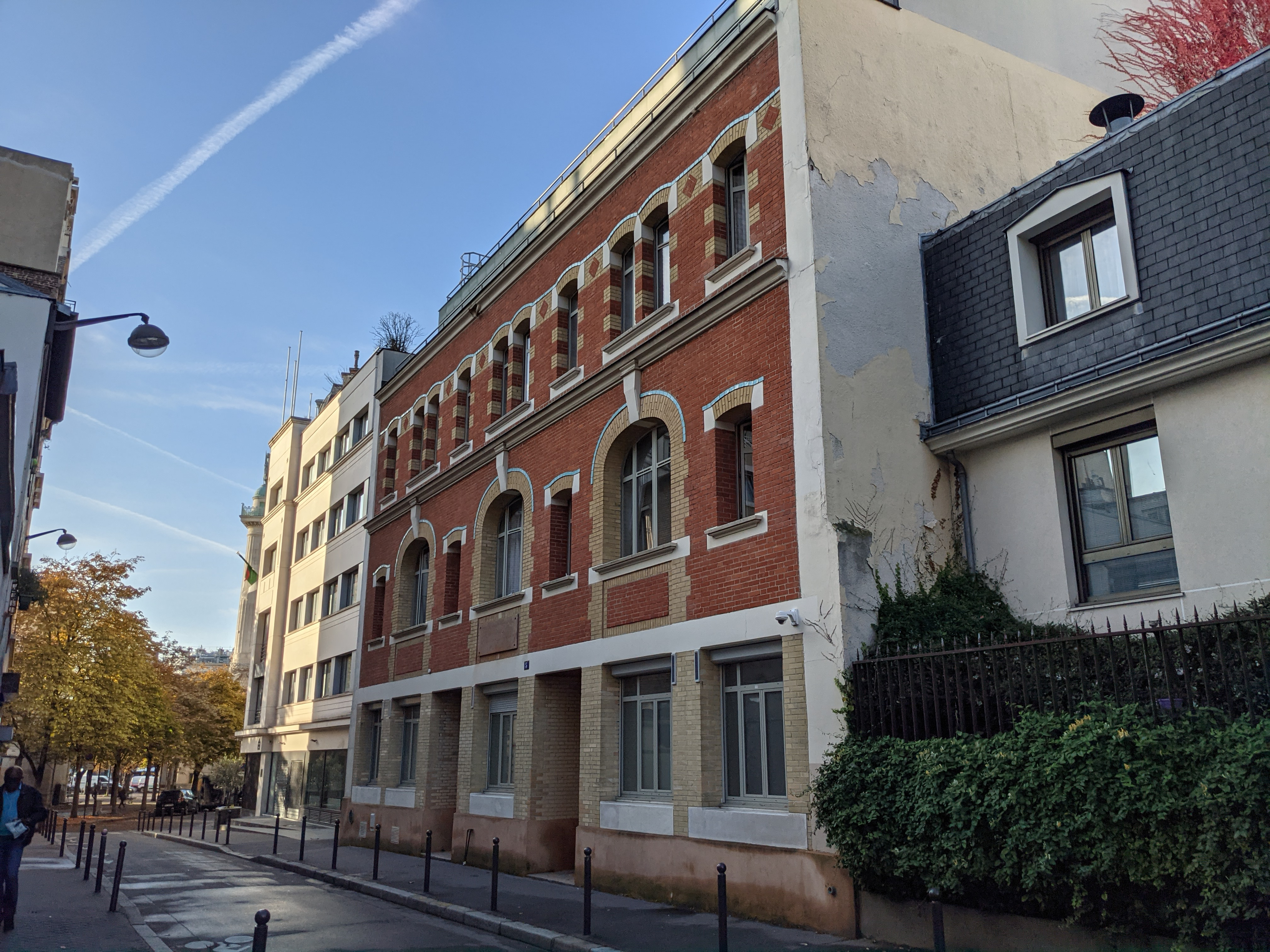
Consulate-General of Algeria in Paris

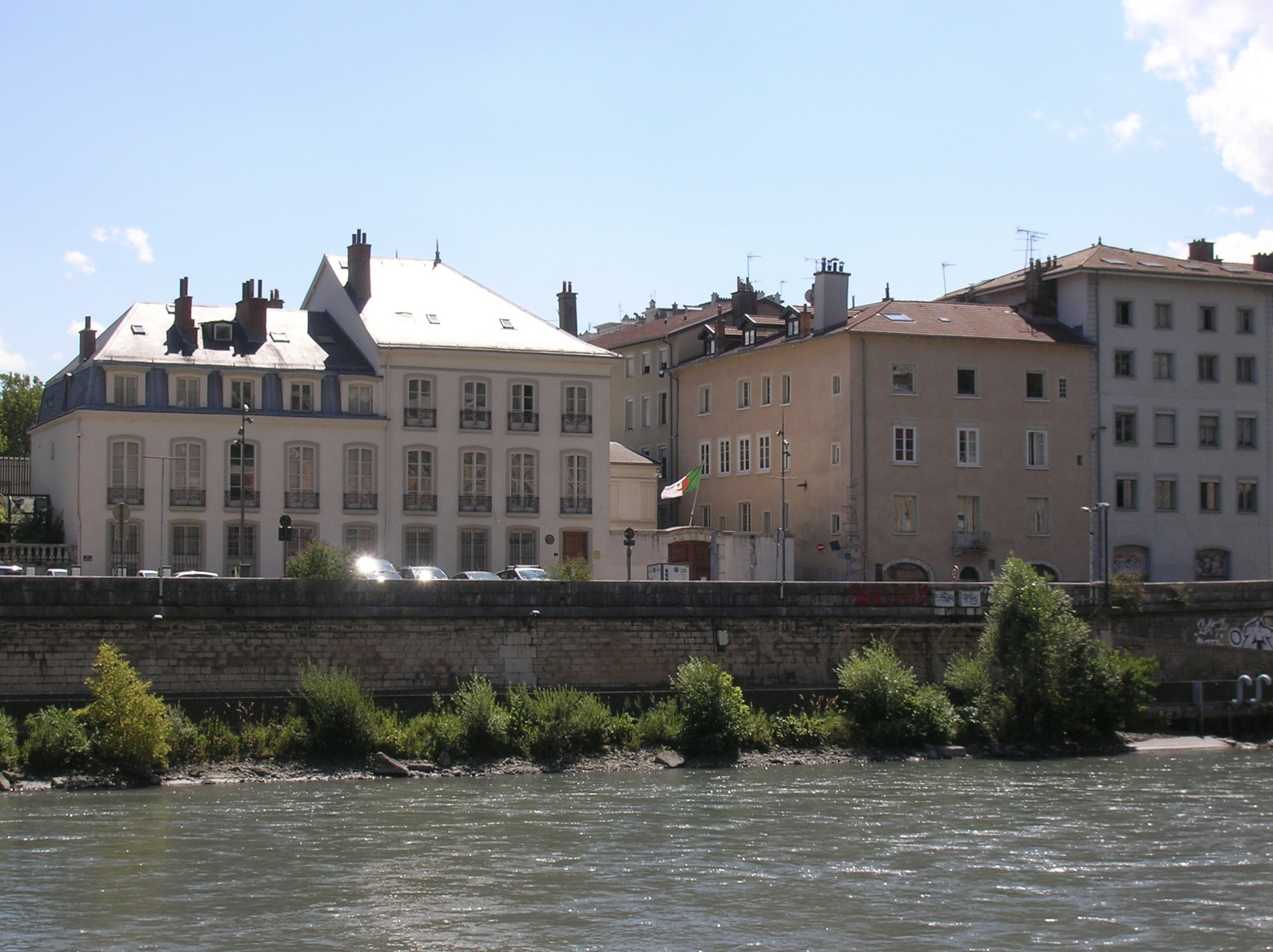
Consulate of Algeria in Grenoble

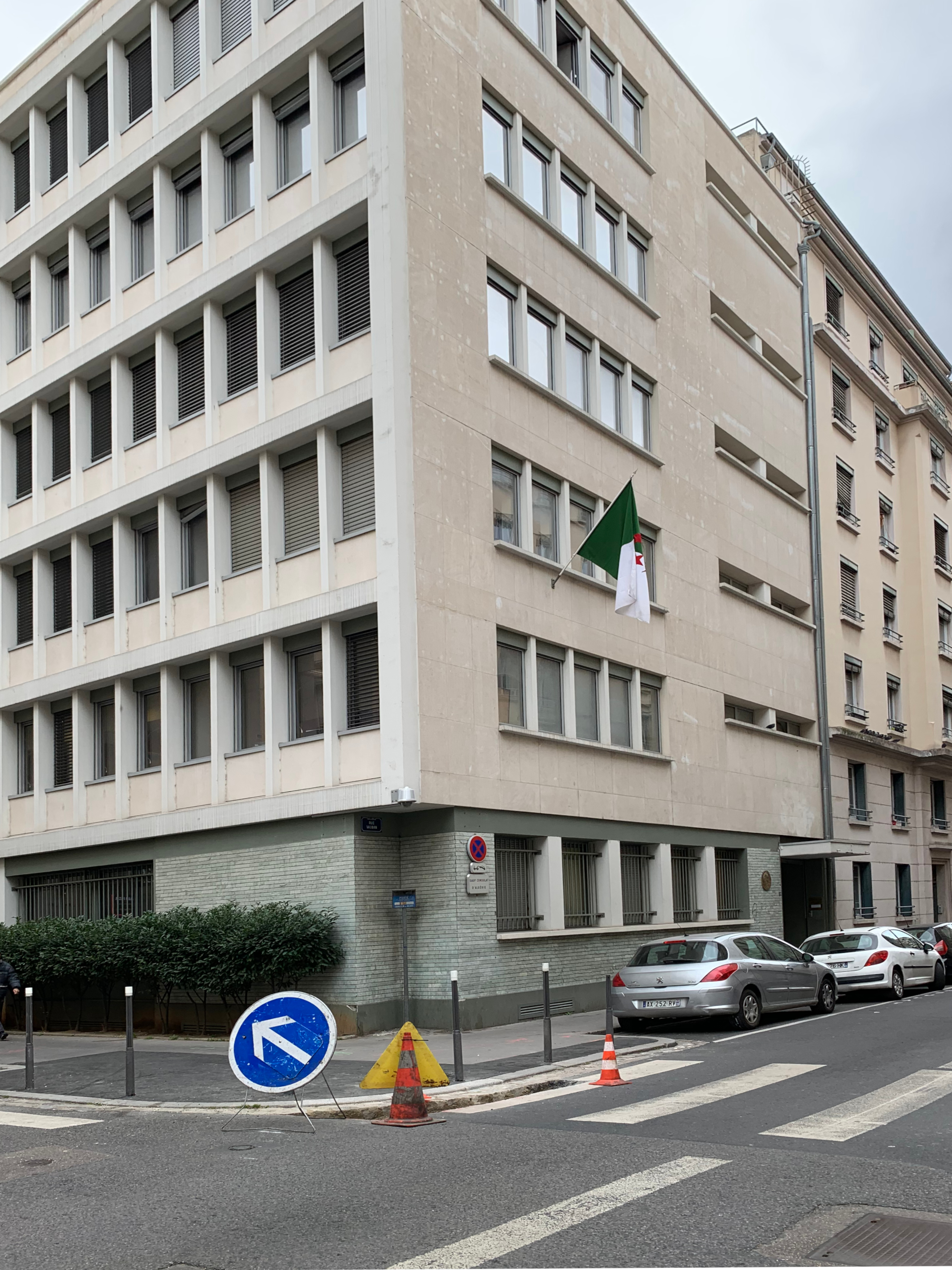
Consulate-General of Algeria in Lyon

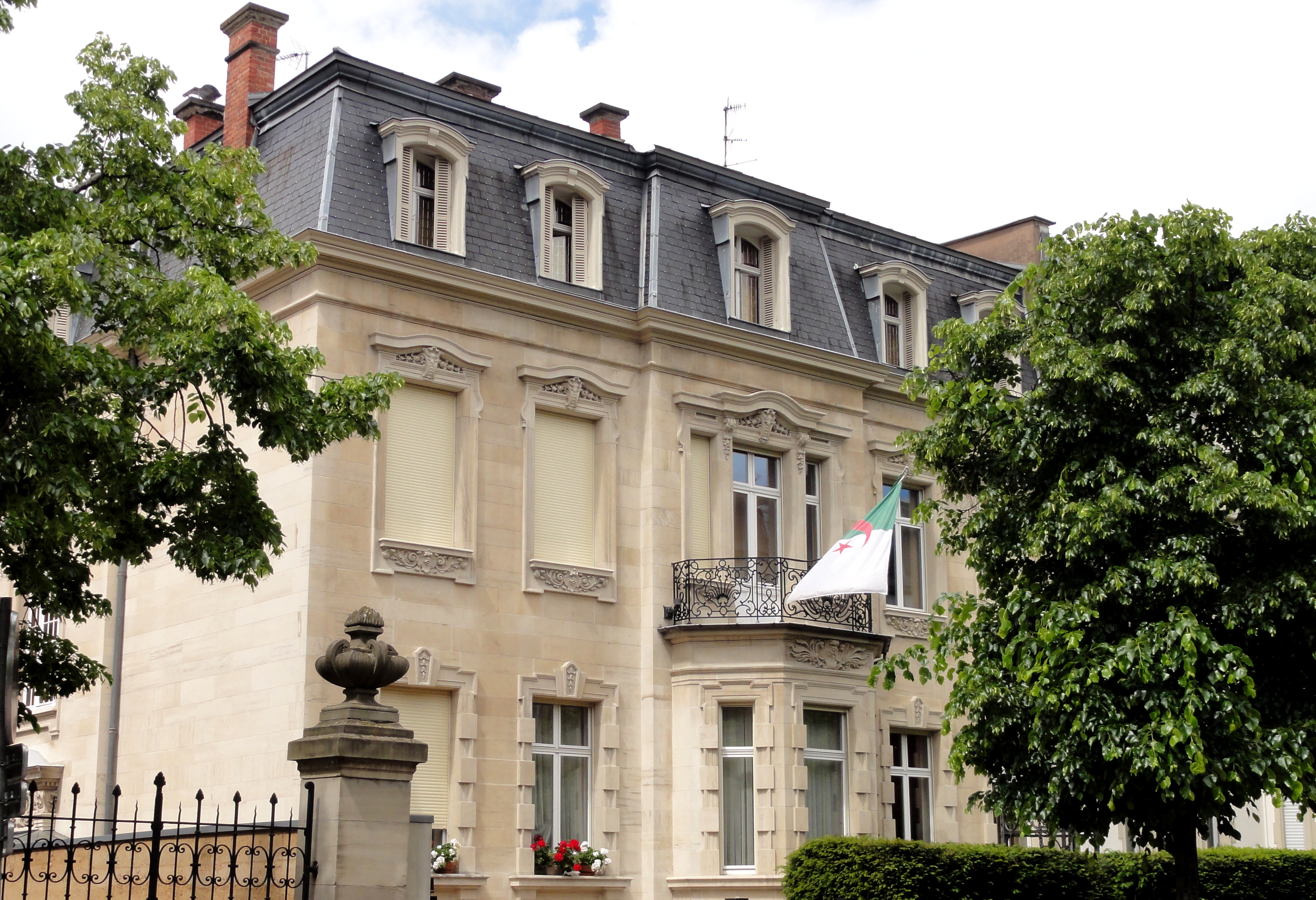
Consulate-General of Algeria in Strasbourg
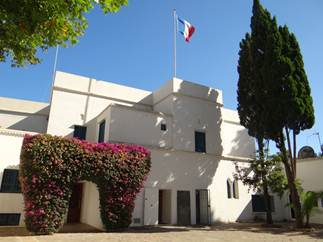
Embassy of France in Algiers

== See also ==
- Algerians in France
- List of Ambassadors of France to Algeria
- Francophone
- Foreign relations of Algeria
- Foreign relations of France
