= Roland Lescure =

French politician

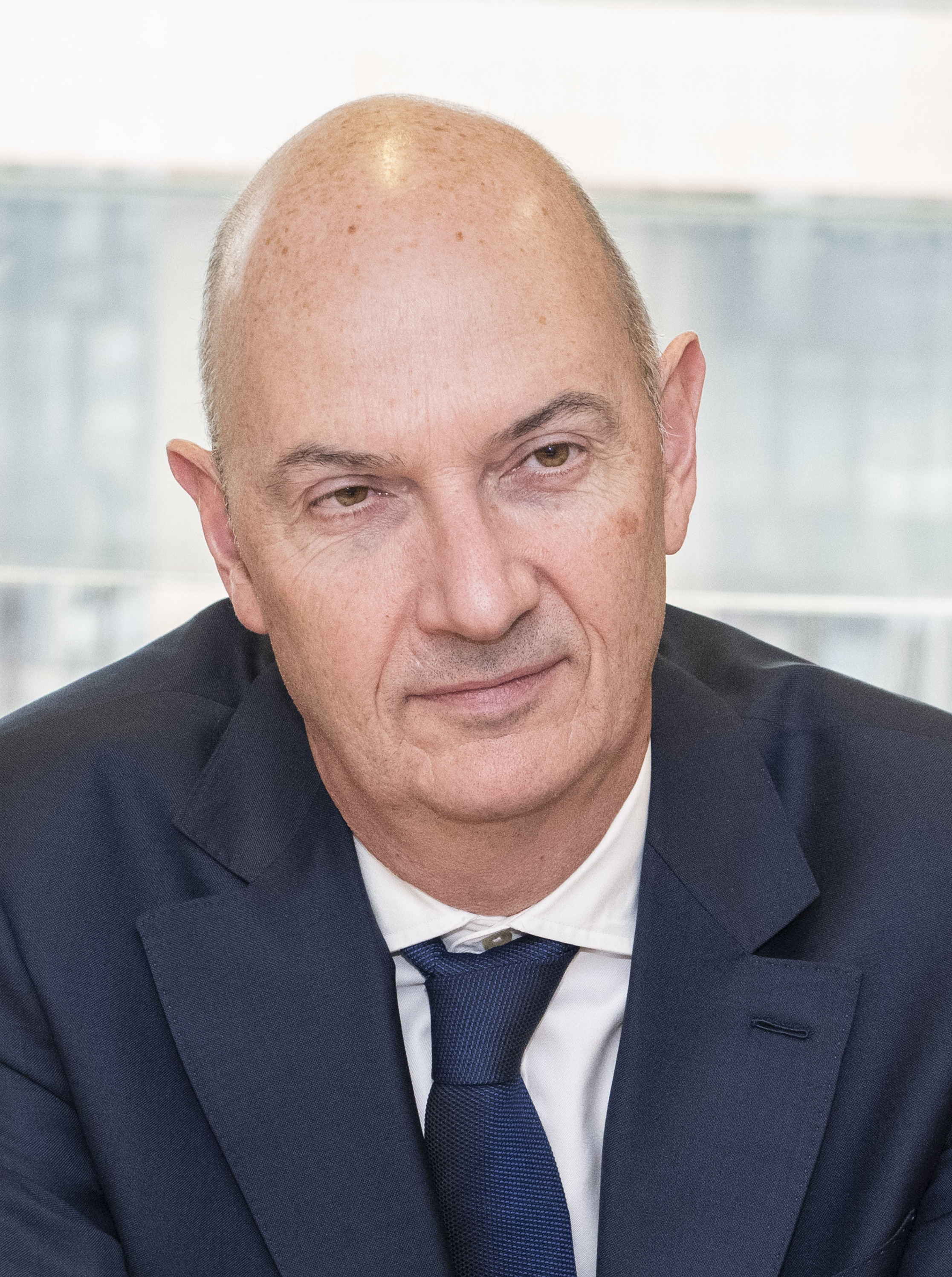
- Roland Lescure in 2022

Minister of the Economy, Finance and Industrial and Energy Sovereignty
- Incumbent
- Assumed office 5 October 2025
- Prime Minister: Sébastien Lecornu
- Preceded by: Éric Lombard

Member of the National Assembly for the First constituency for French residents overseas
- Incumbent
- Assumed office 8 July 2024
- Preceded by: Christopher Weissberg
- In office 21 June 2017 – 4 August 2022
- Preceded by: Frédéric Lefebvre
- Succeeded by: Christopher Weissberg

Minister Delegate for Industry
- In office 4 July 2022 – 21 September 2024
- Prime Minister: Élisabeth Borne; Gabriel Attal
- Preceded by: Agnès Pannier-Runacher
- Succeeded by: Marc Ferracci

President of the Economic Affairs Committee in the National Assembly
- In office 29 June 2017 – 21 June 2022
- Preceded by: Frédérique Massat
- Succeeded by: Guillaume Kasbarian

Personal details
- Born: 26 November 1966 (age 59) Paris, France
- Party: Renaissance
- Other political affiliations: Socialist Party
- Relatives: Pierre Lescure (half-brother)
- Education: École polytechnique ENSAE ParisTech; London School of Economics
- Profession: Economist

Roland Lescure (French pronunciation: [ʁɔlɑ̃ lɛskyʁ]; born 26 November 1966) is a French and Canadian banker and politician who served as Minister Delegate for Industry in the governments of successive Prime Ministers Élisabeth Borne and Gabriel Attal from 2022 to 2024.

Prior to joining the government, Lescure served as a member of the National Assembly, to which he was first elected in 2017. A member of Renaissance, he represented the first constituency for French residents overseas (Canada and United States).

== Early life and career ==
Lescure was born in Paris and raised in Montreuil. His father was a journalist for L'Humanité, while his mother was a trade unionist for the Paris Transport Authority. He studied at the École Polytechnique and the London School of Economics.

Lescure worked as a money manager in France before moving to Montreal, Quebec to take a job as chief investment officer of the Caisse de dépôt et placement du Québec, reporting directly to his superior, the Caisse's president Michael Sabia.

== Political career ==
In parliament, Lescure served as chairman of the Committee on Economic Affairs from 2017 to 2022. In this capacity, he was also the parliament's rapporteur on the privatization of Groupe ADP.

In September 2018, after François de Rugy's appointment to the government, Lescure supported Richard Ferrand's candidacy for the presidency of the National Assembly. Once Ferrand was elected, he stood as a candidate to succeed him as president of the LREM parliamentary group. After having won in the first round, he lost in the second round against Gilles Le Gendre.

Following the 2022 legislative elections, Lescure stood again as a candidate for the National Assembly's presidency; in an internal vote, he lost against Yaël Braun-Pivet.

In October 2025, he was appointed Minister of Finance and Economy in Sébastien Lecornu's first government.

== Political positions ==
In July 2019, Lescure voted in favour of the French ratification of the European Union’s Comprehensive Economic and Trade Agreement (CETA) with Canada.

In 2021, Lescure publicly criticized Minister of the Economy and Finance Bruno Le Maire, arguing that the Castex government's rejection of a proposed $20 billion takeover of Carrefour by Canada’s Alimentation Couche-Tard was due partly by a desire to control domestic food supplies.

In January 2021, as a member of the "Hunting, fishing and territories" study group, the deputy voted in favor of the defense and promotion of hunter's leisure.

In 2026, as Minister of the Economy, Roland Lescure spoke in favor of establishing pension funds in France. He argued that such a move would reduce reliance on American capital while strengthening investment capacities at both national and European levels.

== Personal life ==
Lescure is married to an Irish woman who works as a yoga teacher.
