= Julien Balkany =

French businessman (born 1981)

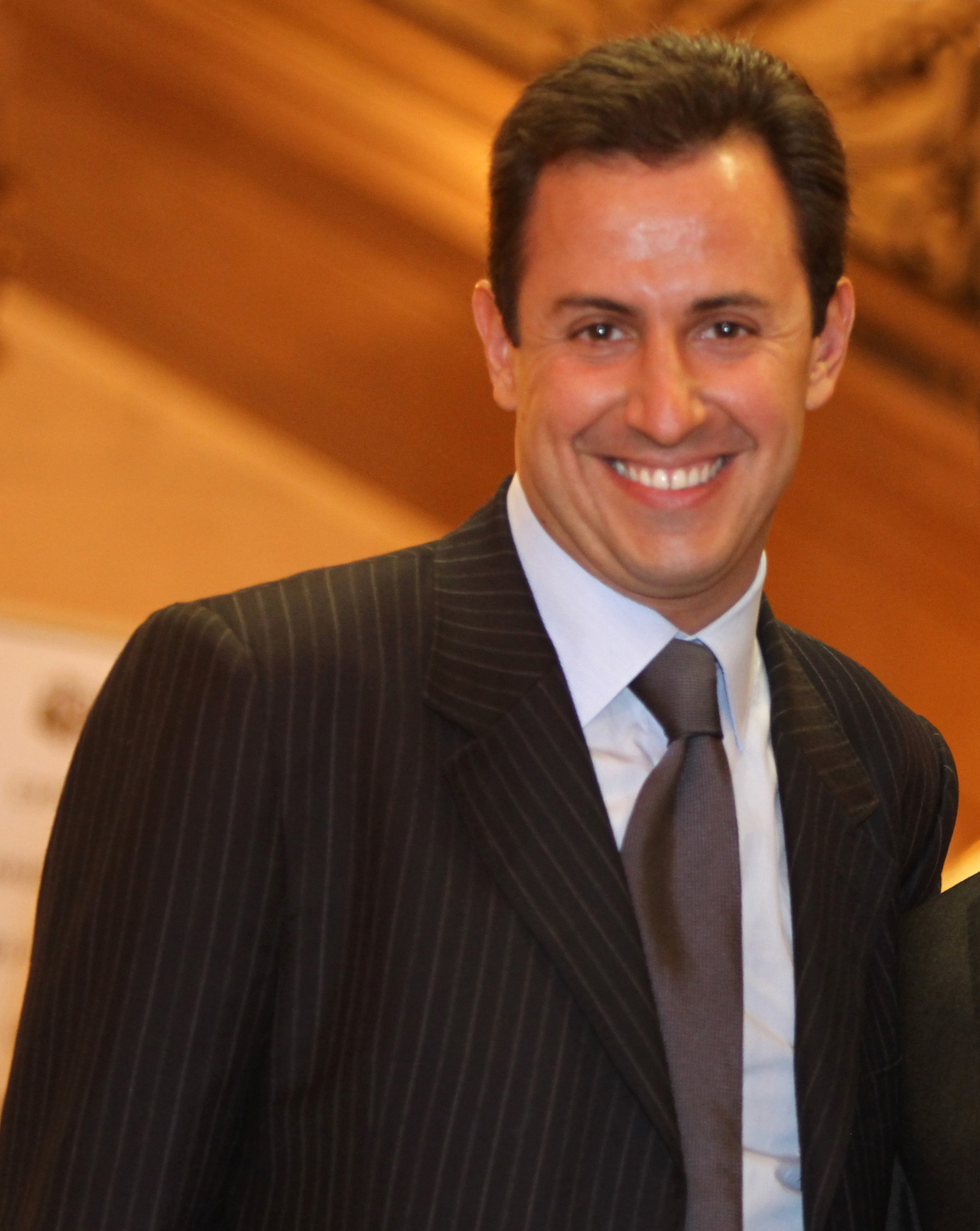
- Julien Balkany
- Born: 29 January 1981; Neuilly, France
- Education: UC Berkeley; IEP Strasbourg
- Occupations: Investor and Oil & Gas Executive
- Movement: French Right wing – Les Republicains
- Website: http://www.julienbalkany.com

Julien Balkany (born 29 January 1981, in Neuilly-sur-Seine, France) is a French businessman and an investor based in London. He is the Chairman of Panoro Energy ASA, the Norwegian oil & gas company based in London as well as the cofounder of the private investment company Nanes Balkany Partners based in New York. He also ran for office in the June 2012 French Parliament election but was defeated.

== Studies and personal life ==
He is of Hungarian origin, and his father Gyula Balkany was deported to Auschwitz before immigrating to France and founding Rety, a Paris-based fashion house.

He was raised in Neuilly, France and attended schools at Sainte-Croix de Neuilly and then at Prepasup-Ipesup Paris. He studied at the Institute of Political Studies in Strasbourg and then Finance at UC Berkeley. He started his career in the emerging markets group of Bear Stearns in New York.

== Business career ==
In 2008, Julien Balkany co-founded Nanes Balkany Partners with Daryl Nanes. The firm is a New York-based activist hedge fund which primarily pursues active value investments in publicly traded oil and gas companies. His strategy of attempting to take advantage of undervalued companies has contributed to his reputation of being a raider and an activist shareholder. In May 2013, Balkany built a large stake in Petrogrand and has been actively seeking to influence the Swedish oil company, to force it to exit Russia and publicly supported Shelton Petroleum hostile takeover attempt.

He was non-executive vice-chairman and director of Toreador, an oil and gas exploration and production company with operations in France from January 2009 to March 2011. in order to rebuild value for the shareholders. After the firm was criticized for its alleged role in the controversy on shale gas exploration in France and the subsequent ban of use of hydraulic fracking technologies, he resigned from the Board in March 2011, with immediate effect. He continued acting in the capacity of a special advisor to Toreador's president until August 2011 when he severed all his links with the company.

== Recognition ==
Balkany was ranked #1 on the 2008 annual list of the "30 Under 30" world's top traders and hedge fund managers published by the U.S. magazine Trader Monthly.

In August 2018, Julien Balkany was ranked #97 in the list of the Top 100 most influential French entrepreneurs.

== Political career ==
On 11 November 2011, he announced that he would stand as candidate for the June 2012 French legislative elections in the First constituency for French residents overseas, including the United States and Canada. He finished fourth, receiving 6.6% of the vote. In spring 2013 he decided not run for the French legislative election, 2013 in the First constituency for French residents overseas. According to Le Figaro He withdrew from the race after having negotiated to be candidate for the UMP at the European Parliament election due in May 2014.

== Controversies ==
=== French-language private school controversy ===
Whilst campaigning in Montreal, Balkany declared he wanted overseas French high schools known as 'Lycée Français' to limit the enrolment of the children of American celebrities so that French nationals could gain access to these exclusive institutions. However, these private schools in North America are not under the direct authority of the French government, despite having accreditation with the Agency for French Teaching Abroad.
