= Hubert Colin de Verdière =

French diplomat (1941–2026)

- Colin de Verdière in 1996

Ambassador of France to Algeria
- In office 21 July 2004 – 20 November 2006
- Preceded by: Daniel Bernard
- Succeeded by: Bernard Bajolet
- In office 10 April 2000 – 29 August 2002
- Preceded by: Alfred Sieffer-Gaillardin
- Succeeded by: Daniel Bernard

Secretary General of the Ministry of Foreign Affairs
- In office 1 September 2002 – 20 July 2004

Ambassador of France to Russia
- In office 18 September 1996 – 17 April 2000
- Preceded by: Pierre Morel
- Succeeded by: Claude Blanchemaison

Ambassador of France to Iran
- In office 13 March 1991 – 27 June 1994
- Preceded by: Christian Graeff
- Succeeded by: Jean-Pierre Masset

Ambassador of France to the United Arab Emirates
- In office 1987 – 15 March 1991
- Preceded by: Charles Crettien
- Succeeded by: Bernard Poletti

Personal details
- Born: 31 October 1941 Roubaix, German-occupied Northern France and Belgium
- Died: 2 October 2026 (aged 84)
- Education: École nationale d'administration
- Occupation: Diplomat

Hubert Colin de Verdière (French: [ybˈɛʁ kolˈɛ̃ dˈə- vɛʁdjˈɛʁ]; 31 October 1941 – 2 October 2026) was a French diplomat.

A graduate of the École nationale d'administration, he spent his career with the Ministry of Foreign Affairs, holding diplomatic roles in the United Arab Emirates, Iran, Russia, and Algeria. He was also Secretary General of the Ministry of Foreign Affairs from 2002 to 2004.

Colin de Verdière died on 2 October 2026, at the age of 84.
