= Christian Déséglise =

Christian Déséglise is an expert in sustainable finance and emerging markets.

He is a managing director and Head of Sustainable Finance and Investments at HSBC, Global Banking and Markets. Previously, he held various positions within HSBC, including Global Head of Central Banks and Sovereign Wealth Funds and Global Head of Emerging Markets at HSBC Global Asset Management. In 2004, he spearheaded the launch of the first BRIC fund invested in the equity markets of Brazil, Russia, India and China.

Mr. Deseglise is a member of the One Planet Lab, a high-level advisory group set up by President Macron to address challenges related to climate change. He co-leads the FAST-Infra initiative, aiming to mobilize private investment to finance sustainable infrastructure in emerging markets. He is also the co-chair of the WEF Global Future Council on SDG Investments and the co-chair of the Sustainable Infrastructure Working Group of HRH the Prince of Wales' Sustainable Markets Initiative.

Mr. Deseglise is also an Adjunct-Professor at Columbia University's School of International and Public Affairs, teaching “Green Transition in Emerging Markets”. Previously he taught at Sciences Po in Paris and the Institute for High Studies for Development in Bogota, Colombia.

In 2011, he launched Columbia University's BRICLab with Marcos Troyjo, one of the first centers to study the implications of the rise of Brazil Russia India and China. The first BRICLab conference took place on December 2, 2011, at Columbia University.

He received a Master of International Affairs from Columbia University in New York. He is also a Graduate from Sciences-Po in Paris and holds a master's degree in Spanish and Latin American Studies from La Sorbonne Nouvelle.

In 2003, together with his wife the artist Genevieve Maquinay, he established Foundation Caring for Colombia, a not-for-profit organization that provides assistance to the victims of violence in Colombia.

== Publications ==
Le Défi des Pays Émergents: Une Chance pour la France, éditions Michel de Maule, Paris, April 2012, ISBN 978-2-87623-449-9.
