= Français du Monde–ADFE =

French organization

French of the World – Democratic Association of French Abroad (French: Français du Monde – Association démocratique des Français de l'étranger, Français du Monde–ADFE), sometimes abbreviated as FdM–ADFE, is a French organisation representing French people living outside France with a worldwide presence. It was established in 1980.

It was quite active in obtaining in 1982 the right for French citizens living overseas to elect their own representatives to a consultative assembly, the Conseil Superieur des Français de l'Etranger (CSFE), the denomination of which was modified in 2004 in "Assemblée des Français de l'étranger" (AFE), electing twelve senators to the French Senate. While the groups in the AFE are not affiliated directly with French political parties, the ADFE generally espouses values belonging to the left-wing. One of its main proposals, to allow French citizens overseas to elect members of the National Assembly of France, was accepted and became reality in 2012.

The ADFE encourages and assists voter registration for presidential elections and referendums. The ADFE, which is not a political party, extends assistance to French citizens overseas in various fields, especially in those related to social help, education and to dealings with consular offices, such as changes of status, issue of documents, pensions, and similar matters.

== See also ==
- Alliance solidaire des Français de l'étranger
