= Embassy of France, Algiers =

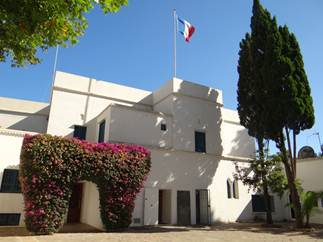
The main Chancery building, also known as the "Castle of Hydra"

The Embassy of France in Algiers (French: Ambassade de France à Alger) is France's diplomatic mission to Algeria. Since the country’s independence in 1962, its Chancery has been located in the Peltzer Park (Parc Peltzer) neighborhood of Hydra, a suburb of Algiers.

== History ==
The compound's main building, known as the Bordj d’Hydra ("Castle of Hydra"), was originally built in the late 18th century for Ali Agha, a Turkish general and hed of the Dey's cavalry. It was later the home of a British physician, Dr Bowen, in the 1820s; of the latter's son-in-law, Consul of Sweden and Norway John Frédérik Schultze; and from 1902, of Serge Peltzer, a Russian national of Dutch descent.

Much of the property was divided into individual lots in the 1920s, when it was linked to Algiers by a new bridge over the Wadi Knis river. In 1942, it was acquired from the Peltzer family by the City of Algiers, and became the residence of the 10th Military Region of the French African Army. In 1943, it was used by the U.S. Army for its ambulance service. In 1955, it became the headquarters of France's 10th Parachute Division led by Jacques Massu. Upon Algerian independence in 1962, it was repurposed as the French embassy, and Ambassador Georges Gorse promptly undertook a comprehensive renovation of the building.

In 1963, the residence of the ambassador was established in the Villa des Oliviers. The Consulate-general was relocated to the Peltzer Park compound in 1994 during the Algerian Civil War.

== See also ==
- Algeria–France relations
- People's Palace (Algiers)
