= Party lists in the 2024 European election in France =

This article is a list of lists for the 2024 European Parliament election in France. It shows the political parties that presented a list for this election. The lists had to be filed with the Ministry of the Interior between 6 May and 17 May 2024.

On 17 May 2024, 37 lists were filed and their order were drawn by lot. The Official Journal published the names of the candidates on 18 May. This number once again constituted a record for a national election in France. Following a decision by the Council of State, a 38th list was added on 23 May 2024. With 81 candidates per list, there was a total of 3,078 candidates in the election.

The professions of faith are visible on the website of the Ministry of the Interior.

== Lists ==
The lists are classified according to the order of the drawing of the Ministry of the Interior.

List name	Parties	European Party	Group	2019 result	2024 result	change	lead candidate
France comes back! La France revient!	National Rally–French Future	ID	ID	23.31	31.37	+8.06	Jordan Bardella
Need for Europe Besoin d’Europe	Ensemble!: Renaissance (RE); Union of Democrats and Independents (UDI); Democratic Movement (MoDem); Horizons (H); Radical Party (PR); En Commun (EC); Progressive Federation (FP); Republican Refoundation (RR)	ALDE / EDP	RE	22.41	14.60	-7.81	Valérie Hayer
Europe Ecology Europe Ecologie	The Ecologists – EELV	EGP	Greens-EFA	13.47	5.50	-8.03	Marie Toussaint
The right to make the voice of France heard in Europe La droite pour faire entendre la voix de la France en Europe	The Republicans–The Centrists	EPP	EPP	8.48	7.25	-1.23	François-Xavier Bellamy
La France Insoumise - Popular union La France insoumise - Union populaire	La France Insoumise: Independent Workers' Party (POI); Ecological Revolution for the Living (REV); Péyi-A (Péyi-A); For Réunion (PLR); Ecosocialist Left (GES)	MLP	The Left	6.31	9.89	+3.58	Manon Aubry
Wake Up Europe Réveiller l'Europe	Socialist Party–Place Publique	PES	S&D	6.19	13.83	+7.64	Raphaël Glucksmann
The Left United for the labor world La gauche unie pour le monde du travail	French Communist Party: Federation of the Republican Left (FGR) • Republican and Socialist Left (GRS) • The Engagement (L'E) • The Radicals of the Left (LRDG); Communist Party of Réunion (PCR)	PEL	The Left	2.49	2.36	-0.13	Léon Deffontaines
Animalist Party - Animals matter, so does your voice Parti animaliste - Les animaux comptent, votre voix aussi	Animalist Party	APEU	−	2.2	2.0	-0.2	Hélène Thouy
Asselineau List - Frexit, for purchasing power and for peace Liste Asselineau - Frexit, pour le pouvoir d'achat et pour la paix	Popular Republican Union	−	−	1.2	1.02	-0.18	François Asselineau
Workers' struggle the workers' camp Lutte ouvrière le camp des travailleurs	Lutte Ouvrière	−	−	0.8	0.49	-0.31	Nathalie Arthaud
Europe that's enough! L'Europe ça suffit!	The Patriots–VIA	ECPM	−	0.7	0.93	+0.23	Florian Philippot
Pirate Party Parti pirate	Pirate Party	PPEU	−	0.1	0.11	+0.01	Caroline Zorn
Free Palestine Free Palestine	Union of French Muslim Democrats	FPP	−	0.1	0.06	-0.04	Nagib Azergui
Esperanto Common Language Espéranto langue commune	Europe–Democracy–Esperanto	EDE	−	0.1	0.04	-0.06	Laure Patas d'Illiers
Peace and Degrowth Paix et Décroissance	Political ecology, pacifism, and the growth objection–Wheelbarrow	−	−	0.1	0.02	-0.08	Michel Simonin
Change Europe Changer l'Europe	New Deal−Let's Go Children	−	S&D	0.0 (Note: ND run with the Socialist Party list)	0.05	-	Pierre Larrouturou
PACE - Party of European Citizens, for the European army, for social Europe, for the planet! PACE - Parti des citoyens européens, pour l'armée européenne, pour l'Europe sociale, pour la planète!	Party of European Citizens	−	−	0.0	0.03	+0.03	Audric Alexandre
Representative democracy Démocratie représentative	Representative democracy	−	−	0.0	0.0	-	Hadama Traoré
Communist Revolutionary Party Parti révolutionnaire Communistes	Communist Revolutionary Party	−	−	0.0	0.01	+0.01	Olivier Terrien
Europe Territories Ecology Europe Territoires Écologie	Europe Territories Ecology: Radical Party of the Left (PRG); Régions et Peuples Solidaires (RPS); Volt France (Volt); Movement of Progressives (MDP); Citizens' Movement (MDC); Collective of Reformist Social Democrats (CSDR)	EFA / Volt	Greens-EFA	− (Note: PRG run with the Socialist Party list, RPS with The Ecologists − EELV list and MDP with the Urgence Écologie list.)	0.26	-	Guillaume Lacroix
Proud France La France fière	Reconquête: Conservative Movement (MC); Party of France (PDF)	ECR	ECR	−	5.47	+5.47	Marion Maréchal
For a World Without Borders or Bosses, Urgent Revolution! Pour un monde sans frontières ni patrons, urgence révolution!	New Anticapitalist Party - Revolutionary	EACL	−	−	0.15	+0.15	Selma Labib
Ecology at the Centre Écologie au centre	Ecology at the Center: Equality Europe Ecology; United European Regions • Bastir Occitanie (BO) • Breton Party (PB) • Lorraine Party (PL) • Provence Nation (PN) • Partit de la Nacion Occitana (PNO); Animal Generation; Young Ecqo; France differently	−	−	−	1.28	-	Jean-Marc Governatori
Equinox: practical ecology and democratic renewal Liste Équinoxe: écologie pratique et renouveau démocratique	Équinoxe	−	−	−	0.29	-	Marine Cholley
Positive Ecology and Territories Écologie positive et Territoires	Positive Ecology and Territories: Positive Ecology (EP); Cap21 (Cap21); France Ecology (FÉ); The Clover - The New Ecologists (Le Trèfle); The Universalists (LU); 100% Citizens (100%C); Basque Nationalist Party (EAJ); The Movement for the animals (LMPA)	EDP	−	−	0.42	-	Yann Wehrling
Free France France libre	Free France: Resistance Union; Revolutionnary Alliance; Counter-Attack; Peace Movement; Citizen Reflections Questions; Life Policy	−	−	−	0.02	-	Francis Lalanne
The Rural Alliance L'Alliance rurale	Résistons!−National Federation of Hunters	−	−	−	2.35	-	Jean Lassalle
We the People Nous le Peuple	Sovereign Republic−The call to the People	−	−	−	0.06	-	Georges Kuzmanovic
For Bread, Peace and Liberty! Pour le pain, la paix, et la liberté!	Workers' Party	−	−	−	0.02	-	Camille Adoue
No to the EU and NATO, communists for peace and social progress Non à l'UE et à l'OTAN, communistes pour la paix et le progrès social	National Association of Communists	−	−	−	0.01	-	Charles Hoareau
Fortress Europe — Nationalist Unity List Forteresse Europe — Liste d'unité nationaliste	The Nationalists	APF	−	−	0.02	-	Pierre-Marie Bonneau
For another Europe Pour une autre Europe	We Citizens−Citizen Federation	−	−	−	0.02	-	Jean-Marc Fortané
For real democracy: Let's decide for ourselves! Pour une démocratie réelle: Décidons nous-mêmes!	Let's Decide for Ourselves: Decidemos; Popular Constituent Movement; All by the People	−	−	−	0.01	-	Philippe Ponge
No! Let's take ourselves in hand Non! Prenons-nous en main	Stay Free	−	−	−	0.01	-	Edouard Husson
The citizen hive La ruche citoyenne	The citizen hive	−	−	−	0.02	-	Lorys Elmayan
Defend the Children Défendre les enfants	− (Note: Supported by many associations: Rights of the parent and the child, Root of Children, Grandmas Grandpas Grief, Parental Equity, We want to see our grandchildren, I love my 2 parents, Dynamic Parents, Father-Child Mother and 24 hours of Le Mans for Parental Equality)	−	−	−	0.02	-	Gaël Coste-Meunier
For a sovereign humanity Pour une humanité souveraine	Citizen Change	−	−	−	0.00	-	Fidèl' (Note: His real name being Léopold-Edouard Deher-Lesaint)

== Detail of lists ==
=== For a sovereign humanity (Citizen change) ===
1. Léopold-Edouard Deher-Lesaint
2. Sandra Boulogne
3. Rodrigue Aj
4. Valente Joby
5. Richard Mayoute
6. George Esdras
7. Guillaume Manette
8. Alison Poidras
9. Tony Rebus
10. Diane Felix
11. Fredy Richardson
12. Valencia Fonrose
13. Jocelyn Charmant
14. Corinne Christine
15. Jérémy Godat
16. Ginette Courbain
17. Mickaël Nazaire
18. Magalie Mano
19. Williams Eroni
20. Syhana Fleury
21. Mederick Boulogne
22. Uranie Norval
23. Jonathan Becquet
24. Diana Zenon-Clairy
25. Albert Manere
26. Agnès Adonaï
27. Christian Benjamin
28. Woodlyne Thelusma
29. Antony Valier
30. Audrey Charmant
31. Patrice Suares
32. Jennifer Maes
33. Guillaume Glinel
34. Micheline Rotin
35. Jonnathan Maes
36. Emeline Allamellou
37. Manuel Rupaire
38. Lydia Chathuant
39. Kévin Ruscade
40. Nathalie Jean-Noël
41. Morgan Oranger
42. Claudine Brooks
43. Kilian Karani
44. Zeymra-Loïs Ladj
45. Cédric Moula
46. Alexandra Boulogne
47. Kevin Boulogne
48. Fatouma Karani
49. Alex Beltai
50. Valérie Lepel
51. Dylan Virapin
52. Lovelie Boulogne
53. Yann Chaubo
54. Annie Chery
55. Pascal Vado
56. Brigitte Nagera
57. Livio Jabot
58. Guylène Boulogne
59. Jerôme Baden
60. Patricia Desbonnes
61. Jean Bougrer
62. Maryvonne Desesquelles
63. Mehdy Negre-Popote
64. Cheryl Bassin
65. Éric Augustin
66. Mabintou Dibassy
67. Pierre Barre
68. Dayna Chavriacouty
69. Rodney Thomer
70. Marie-Luc Opet
71. Jean-Luc Moula
72. Marie Myrtal
73. Jean Lucy
74. Yoana Desfontaines
75. Alain Boulogne
76. Zoé Dyvrande
77. Gérard Augusty
78. Laurine Duriveau
79. Alex Merluche
80. Andréa Pelmont
81. Patrice Ricart

=== For a Real Democracy: Let's Decide for Ourselves! ===
Cette liste, candidate pour la première fois aux élections européennes, de la coalition démocratique Décidons Nous-Mêmes, soutenue par le parti Decidemos prône la démocratie directe, avec le référendum d'initiative citoyenne constitutionnel comme en Suisse, la souveraineté populaire, ainsi que l’instauration du référendum d’initiative citoyenne européen confédéral. Y candidate en particulier en No. 11 Yvan Bachaud, militant du référendum d'initiative citoyenne (RIC) depuis 1977.

This list, candidate for the first time in the European elections, of the democratic coalition Décidons Nous-Mêmes, supported by the Decidemos party, advocates direct democracy, with the constitutional citizens' initiative referendum as in Switzerland, popular sovereignty, as well as the establishment of the European confederal citizens' initiative referendum. In particular, candidate no. 11 Yvan Bachaud, activist of the citizens' initiative referendum (RIC) since 1977.

1. Philippe Ponge
2. Aude Rossolini
3. Stéphane Corcelle
4. Marilu Escobar
5. Luca de Paris
6. Sandrine Bellon
7. Alfonso Dorado
8. Alice Vasseur
9. Stéphane Collet
10. Malika Bouraïya
11. Yvan Bachaud
12. Hélène Corcelle
13. Nicolas Bériot
14. Emma Robin
15. Gérard Chambon
16. Alice Médigue
17. Jacques Laborde
18. Gaël Le Garrec
19. Philippe Combaz
20. Michelle Lerat
21. Didier Fleury
22. Chantal Cottet
23. Francis Haderer
24. Amal Gherab
25. Loïc Gourmelon
26. Paola Boumaiza
27. André Goré
28. Christine Navel
29. Jean-Jacques Lemaire
30. Sandrine Cibiel
31. Thomas Cuerq
32. Gaëlle Mainguy
33. Saïd Bouchelaghem
34. Flore Creantor
35. Michel Algret
36. Colette Rieux
37. Adrien Le Quilleuc
38. Nathalie Beaurain
39. Joël Coachon
40. Sandrine Urgin
41. Alain Le Hyaric
42. Sylvie Thelier
43. Gérard Cardinault
44. Gislaine Even
45. Roland Assaraf
46. Sylvie Théodore
47. Yazid Zerrouki
48. Annie Gonidou
49. Nicolas Ramaye
50. Patricia Romanczuk
51. René Tonder
52. Denise Roland
53. Jean Guiart
54. Estelle Testa
55. Matthieu Le Morzellec
56. Hélène Lacherez
57. Jean-Noël Falquet
58. Marie Tastu
59. Jean-Pierre Barbier
60. Paulette Trespeuch
61. Maurice Alexanian
62. Christelle Leclercq
63. Vincent Garcia
64. Petra Solliec
65. Marc Hennique
66. Johanne Adrianasolo
67. Alexis Kobetz
68. Catherine Asteix
69. Éric Vilain
70. Marie-Emmanuelle Lamelot
71. Claude Collet
72. Alexa Delaveau
73. Laurent Chatenet
74. Sylvie Romero
75. Mamy Ramaharomanana
76. Christelle Plé
77. Laurent Termeau
78. Élise Aubert
79. Sacha Kosavic
80. Sophie Hamelle
81. Cyrille Dumoutier

=== National Rally ===
On 3 September 2023, Jordan Bardella announced: "I will naturally lead the National Rally list for the European elections". Fabrice Leggeri announced on 17 February 2024, that he would appear in third place on the list. On 24 March, Malika Sorel announced that she was joining the list; as in second position. On 1 May, the party unveiled the first 35 names of its list during a meeting of Jordan Bardella and Marine Le Pen in Perpignan, list closed by the mayor of Perpignan, also vice-president of the party, Louis Aliot, who appeared in 81st place.

1. Jordan Bardella
2. Malika Sorel
3. Fabrice Leggeri
4. Mathilde Androuët
5. Jean-Paul Garraud
6. Mélanie Disdier
7. Matthieu Valet
8. Anne-Sophie Frigout
9. Thierry Mariani
10. Pascale Piera
11. Philippe Olivier
12. Marie-Luce Brasier-Clain
13. Alexandre Varaut
14. Catherine Griset
15. Gilles Pennelle
16. Virginie Joron
17. Julien Sanchez
18. Julie Rechagneux
19. Aleksandar Nikolic
20. Valérie Deloge
21. Rody Tolassy
22. Marie Dauchy
23. Pierre-Romain Thionnet
24. Nathaly Antona
25. Pierre Pimpie
26. Sylvie Josserand
27. Julien Leonardelli
28. Angéline Furet
29. Gaëtan Dussausaye
30. France Jamet
31. André Rougé
32. Séverine Werbrouck
33. Christophe Bay
34. Eléonore Bez
35. Andréa Kotarac
36. Audrey Guibert
37. Thimothée Etchecopar
38. Émilie Bommart
39. Christian Zimmermann
40. Sylvie Franceschini
41. Éric Minardi
42. Mylène Wunsch
43. Frédéric Weber
44. Coline Houssays
45. Laurent Merengone
46. Renée Thomaïdis
47. Valery Elophe
48. Marie-Claude Voinçon
49. Julien Bacou
50. Céline Porquet
51. Jacques Ricciardetti
52. Manon Bouquin
53. Antoine Kieffer
54. Vanessa Lancelot
55. Gauthier Bouchet
56. Florelle Nouguier
57. Frédéric Fabre
58. Afidati Mkadara
59. Jean-Paul Vallon
60. Florence Joubert
61. Maxime Bot
62. Marie-Françoise Kurdziel
63. Jérôme Minard
64. Victoria de Vigneral
65. Jean-Luc Yelma
66. Céline Tacher
67. Thierry Perez
68. Aurore Lahondès
69. Flavien Termet
70. Brigitte Gaudineau
71. Aymeric Mongelous
72. Magalie Luho
73. François Ducamp
74. Camille Dos Santos de Oliveira
75. Sébastien Delbosq
76. Marine Bardet
77. Louis Clément
78. Martine Demonchy
79. Franck Briffaut
80. Marine Le Pen
81. Louis Aliot

== Parties that withdrew ==
A number of parties intended to stand lists but later withdrew before the election.

=== New Anticapitalist Party ===
The New Anticapitalist Party – The Anticapitalist (NPA-A) decided on 4 January 2024 not to present a list alone in the European elections but instead to try to forge an agreement with La France insoumise (LFI) with a view to uniting the anti-liberal left. Finally, the party announces theFebruary 22The failure of negotiations: LFI does not wish to find itself in an alliance solely with the far-left party, after the other members of the NUPES refused to participate in a joint list, and points to fundamental disagreements on the issue of the war in Ukraine, with the NPA-A advocating for Ukraine's entry into the European Union. Philippe Poutou, one of the party's spokespeople, was nevertheless a candidate in Belgium in the French-speaking constituency, in 3rd position on the Anticapitalist Left list.

=== Truth and Justice for Peace Forum ===
On 29 February 2024, Le Monde reveals that the General Directorate for Internal Security began investigating a list "serving the interests of Moscow" named "Truth and Justice for Peace Forum" and led by former National Rally MEP Jean-Luc Schaffhauser (who has since left the RN), notably behind the loan to this party by a Russian bank, "aided by pro-Russian figures close to the far right" including Pierre Plas, "former military man", journalist Dimitri de Kochko and former RN members like Guillaume Pradoura

=== Debout la France ===
The member of parliament for Essonne's 8th constituency and the leader of Debout la France, Nicolas Dupont-Aignan, announced on 26 March 2024, that he was giving up on presenting a list for the European elections for financial reasons following polls showing his party below the campaign reimbursement threshold. Weeks after the election, Nicolas Dupont-Aignan was unseated in the 2024 French legislative election.

=== Génération.s ===
For the Génération.s party, the European elections period began with significant internal tensions stemming from a vote held without consulting party members regarding a possible alliance with the La France insoumise, prompting the leadership to change its national coordinators. The party, a member of the New Ecological and Social People's Union (NUPES), decided on 2 April 2024 to not present a candidate list (unlike the 2019 European Parliament election) and by not allying with any party in the NUPES, chose not to divide the left-wing bloc. This was to avoid involvement in the criticism between the political formations within the alliance in order to prepare for their gathering for the 2027 French presidential election. However, the former national coordinator of the movement in office before the internal discord regarding the alliance with LFI, Arash Saeidi, was to be placed in 6th position on the list headed by Manon Aubry, leaving Génération.s at the same time to join La France Insoumise.

=== Independent Ecological Movement ===
The Independent Ecological Movement (MEI) announced on 22 April 2024 that they would ultimately not present a list for the European elections due to budgetary reasons. This list would have been led by Iris Nakov of the MEI and Grégory Berthault of Écologie autrement.

=== Centrist Alliance and Territories in Movement ===
On 31 March 2024, following a rapprochement between their movements, Philippe Folliot of the Centrist Alliance and Jean-Christophe Fromantin of Territories in Movement merged their proposed lists. They hoped to bring Utiles on board with this list headed by Gilles Mentré. Ultimately, they announced they were withdrawing on 3 May 2024 due to insufficient funds.

=== Alliance Royale ===
As in every European election since 2004, the Alliance Royale intended to field candidates. However, unable to find enough candidates to complete its list, the party had to withdraw on 16 May 2024.

=== The Union for a Rainbow Europe (Fair Europe) ===
Fair Europe planned to present a list headed by Thierry-Paul Valette, under the banner "Union for a Rainbow Europe". Ultimately, the party did not submit any list to the Minister of the Interior, due to an insufficient number of candidates, according to a party statement published on 18 May 2024.

=== Union of Centrists and Ecologists ===
Antonin Duarte, president of the Green Party and the Union of Centrists and Greens, wanted his parties to compete in these elections. Ultimately, the parties did not submit any lists to the Ministry of the Interior on 18 May 2024. According to Antonin Duarte, they withdrew to avoid multiplying the number of Green lists in the face of the rise of the far right. According to Mediapart on 7 May 2024, they had not raised enough funds to stand.

=== Federalist Party ===
The Federalist Party, ed by Yves Gernigon, intended to participate in the election, as it had in the 2019 European Parliament election where it won 0.05% of the vote. Ultimately, the party did not submit any list to the Minister of the Interior, citing financial reasons according to a press release published on 19 May 2024.
