= 2024 French legislative election in Dordogne =

Following the first round of the 2024 French legislative election on 30 June 2024, runoff elections in each constituency where no candidate received a vote share greater than 50 percent were scheduled for 7 July. Candidates permitted to stand in the runoff elections needed to either come in first or second place in the first round or achieve more than 12.5 percent of the votes of the entire electorate (as opposed to 12.5 percent of the vote share due to low turnout).

== Dordogne ==
=== 1st constituency ===
Candidate	Party or alliance		First round		Second round	
Candidate	Party or alliance		Votes	%	Votes	%
Nadine Lechon	National Rally		20,199	38.24	24,180	50.09
Pascale Martin	New Popular Front	New Popular Front	15,540	29.42	24,089	49.91
Clément Tonon	Ensemble	Horizons	12,835	24.30		
Bérenger Desport Namur	The Republicans		2,789	5.28		
Jonathan Almosnino	Far-left	Lutte Ouvrière	751	1.42		
Antoine Coutou	Reconquête		572	1.08		
Stéphane Lambert	Independent		129	0.24		
Total			52,815	100.00	48,269	100.00
Valid votes			52,815	96.06	48,269	88.27
Invalid votes			922	1.68	2,103	3.85
Blank votes			1,245	2.26	4,310	7.88
Total votes			54,982	100.00	54,682	100.00
Registered voters/turnout			78,107	70.39	78,107	70.01

=== 2nd constituency ===
Candidate	Party or alliance		First round		Second round	
Candidate	Party or alliance		Votes	%	Votes	%
Serge Muller	National Rally		24,374	42.71	28,256	52.05
Christophe Cathus	New Popular Front	Socialist Party	16,131	28.27	26,027	47.95
Michel Delpon	Ensemble	Renaissance	11,173	19.58		
Josie Bayle	The Republicans		4,574	8.01		
Lise Khelfaoui	Far-left	Lutte Ouvrière	816	1.43		
Total			57,068	100.00	54,283	100.00
Valid votes			57,068	96.63	54,283	91.34
Invalid votes			857	1.45	1,745	2.94
Blank votes			1,134	1.92	3,402	5.72
Total votes			59,059	100.00	59,430	100.00
Registered voters/turnout			84,286	70.07	84,293	70.50

=== 3rd constituency ===
Candidate	Party or alliance		First round		Second round	
Candidate	Party or alliance		Votes	%	Votes	%
Florence Joubert	National Rally		19,093	40.13	22,589	50.08
Christelle Druillole	New Popular Front	Socialist Party	13,600	28.58	22,514	49.92
Jean-Pierre Cubertafon	Ensemble	Democratic Movement	11,103	23.33		
Myriam Thomasson	The Republicans		3,104	6.52		
Jacques Decoùpy	Far-left	Lutte Ouvrière	681	1.43		
Total			47,581	100.00	45,103	100.00
Valid votes			47,581	96.17	45,103	90.41
Invalid votes			898	1.82	1,688	3.38
Blank votes			995	2.01	3,095	6.20
Total votes			49,474	100.00	49,886	100.00
Registered voters/turnout			66,947	73.90	66,951	74.51

=== 4th constituency ===
Candidate	Party or alliance		First round		Second round	
Candidate	Party or alliance		Votes	%	Votes	%
Dominique-Louise Marchaudon	National Rally		22,767	36.01	27,184	45.36
Sébastien Peytavie	New Popular Front	Génération.s	21,801	34.49	32,750	54.64
Jérôme Peyrat	Miscellaneous centre	Independent	10,521	16.64		
Anne-Catherine Balland	The Republicans		4,836	7.65		
François Tourne	Ensemble	Renaissance	1,904	3.01		
Nathalie Ballerand	Reconquête		730	1.15		
Christophe Green-Madeo	Far-left	Lutte Ouvrière	657	1.04		
Total			63,216	100.00	59,934	100.00
Valid votes			63,216	96.12	59,934	90.66
Invalid votes			1,071	1.63	1,960	2.96
Blank votes			1,483	2.25	4,215	6.38
Total votes			65,770	100.00	66,109	100.00
Registered voters/turnout			89,941	73.13	89,951	73.49
