= Thibault Lassalle =

French rugby union footballer

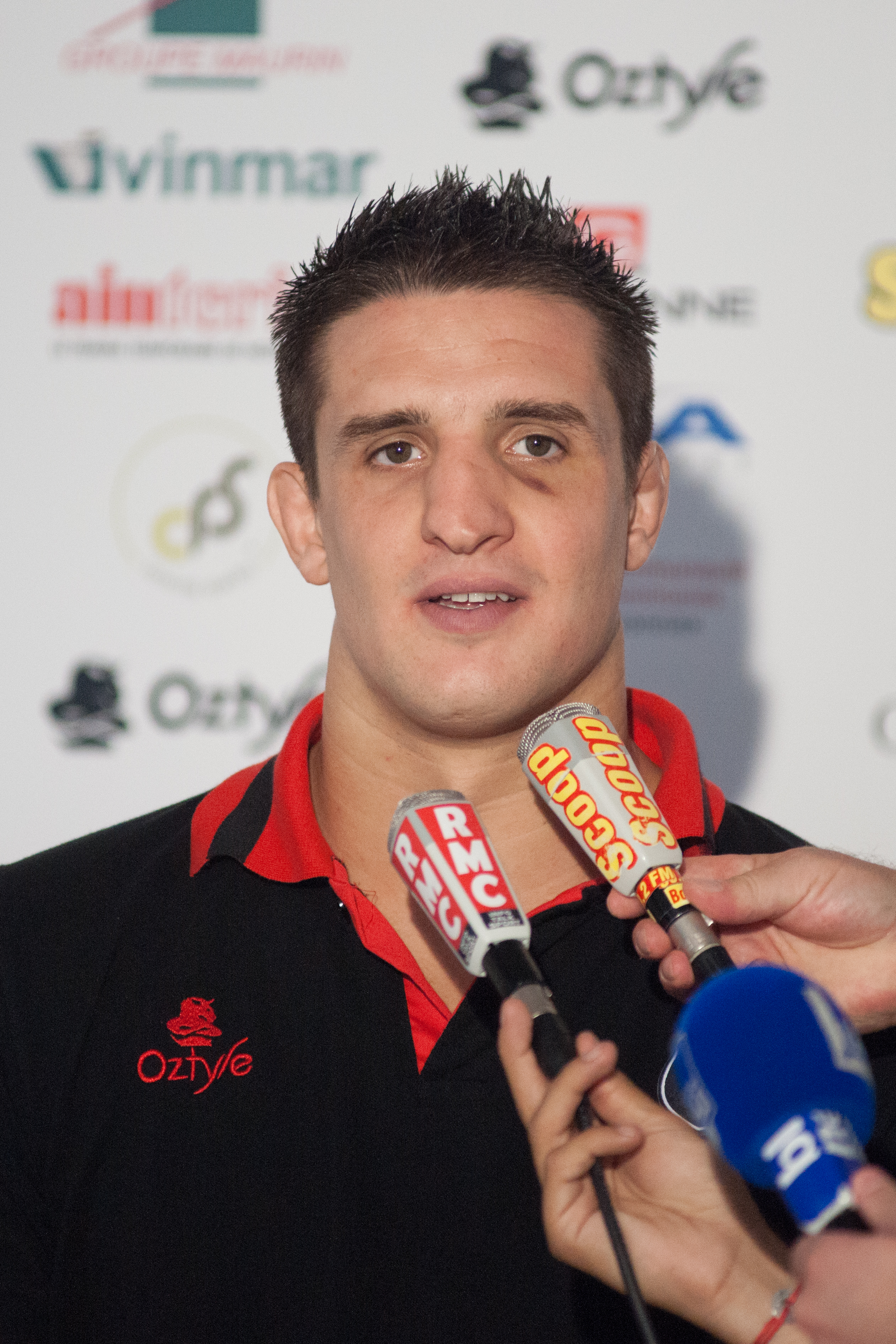
- Born: Thibault Lassalle; 22 August 1987 (age 39) Oloron-Sainte-Marie, France
- Height: 2.02 m (6 ft 7 1/2 in)
- Weight: 118 kg (18 st 8 lb)

Rugby union career
- Position: Lock
Senior career
Years	Team	Apps	(Points)
2006–2012	Agen	43	(0)
2012–2015	Oyonnax	63	(20)
2015–2016	Toulon	18	(0)
2016–2019	Castres	51	(0)
2019–2022	Oyonnax	49	(5)
International career
Years	Team	Apps	(Points)
2006	France U19	5	(0)

Thibault Lassalle (born 22 August 1987) is a French former professional rugby union player. He played as a lock for Agen, Oyonnax, Toulon, and Castres.

== Personal life ==
Lassalle's father is French politician Jean Lassalle who has been a member of the National Assembly for the Pyrénées-Atlantiques' 4th constituency since 2002 and was a candidate for the 2017 French presidential election.
