= Pyrénées-Atlantiques's 4th constituency =

Constituency of the National Assembly of France

4th constituency of Pyrénées-Atlantiques
- inline Constituency of the National Assembly of France

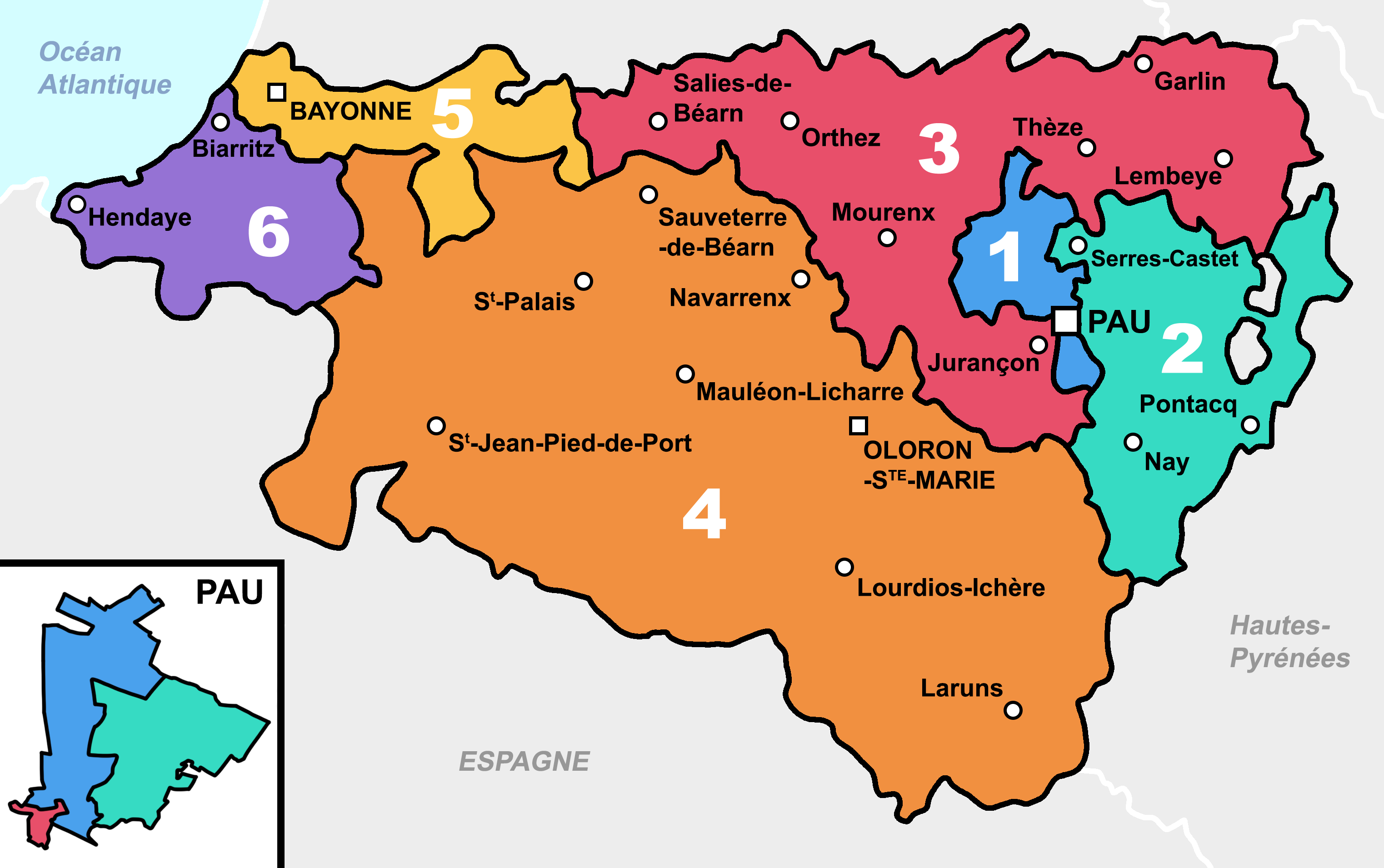
- The different constituencies of the Pyrénées-Atlantiques

- Pyrénées-Atlantiques in France
- Deputy: Iñaki Echaniz; PS
- Department: Pyrénées-Atlantiques
- Cantons: (pre-2015) Accous, Aramits, Arudy, Hasparren, Iholdy, Laruns, Mauléon-Licharre, Navarrenx, Oloron-Sainte-Marie-Est, Oloron-Sainte-Marie-Ouest, Saint-Étienne-de-Baïgorry, Saint-Jean-Pied-de-Port, Saint-Palais, Sauveterre-de-Béarn, Tardets-Sorholus
- Registered voters: 103,030

The 4th constituency of the Pyrénées-Atlantiques (French: Quatrième circonscription des Pyrénées-Atlantiques) is a French legislative constituency in Pyrénées-Atlantiques département. Like the other 576 French constituencies, it elects one MP using the two-round system, with a run-off if no candidate receives over 50% of the vote in the first round.

== Description ==
It includes the communes of Lourdios-Ichère, Oloron-Sainte-Marie and is currently represented by Iñaki Echaniz of the PS.

== Deputies ==
Election	Member	Party
1988	Michel Inchauspé	RPR
1993	Michel Inchauspé	RPR
1997	Michel Inchauspé	RPR
2002	Jean Lassalle	UDF
2007	Jean Lassalle	MoDem
2012	Jean Lassalle	MoDem
2017	Jean Lassalle	Résistons!
2022	Iñaki Echaniz	PS

== Election results ==
=== 2024 ===
Candidate	Party	Alliance	First round		Second round	
Candidate	Party	Alliance	Votes	%	Votes	%
Iñaki Echaniz	PS	NFP	21,968	38.01	27,762	47.92
Sylviane Lopez	RN		14,806	25.62	16,753	28.92
Jean Lasalle	Ind	DVD	10,434	18.05	13,419	23.16
Beñat Cachenaut	LR		8,983	15.54		
Gracianne Mirande Bec	Ind	REG	1,128	1.95		
Carlos Ribeiro	LO		476	0.82		
Valid votes			57,795	97.72	57,934	97.10
Blank votes			928	1.57	1,304	2.19
Null votes			422	0.71	429	0.72
Turnout			59,145	73.21	59,667	73.85
Abstentions			21,647	26.79	21,131	26.15
Registered voters			80,792		80,798	
Result			PS HOLD			

=== 2022 ===
Legislative Election 2022: Pyrénées-Atlantiques's 4th constituency
Party	Candidate	Votes	%	±%
LREM (Ensemble)	Annick Trounday	11,508	26.65	+1.24
PS (NUPÉS)	Iñaki Echaniz	10,395	24.07	-2.27
R!	Julien Lassalle	8,751	20.27	+2.56
RN	Sylviane Lopez	5,015	11.61	+7.33
REG	Egoitz Urrutikoetxea	4,333	10.03	N/A
REC	Margaux Taillefer	1,526	3.53	N/A
DVE	Valérie Bouchard	931	2.16	N/A
Others	N/A	722	1.67	
Turnout		43,181	55.05	−3.48
2nd round result
PS (NUPÉS)	Iñaki Echaniz	19,936	50.11	N/A
LREM (Ensemble)	Annick Trounday	19,846	49.89	+2.68
Turnout		39,782	54.62	+1.25
PS gain from R!				

=== 2017 ===
Results of the 11 June and 18 June 2017 French National Assembly election in Pyrénées-Atlantiques’ 4th Constituency
Candidate	Party		1st round		2nd round	
Candidate	Party		Votes	%	Votes	%
Loïc Corrégé	La République En Marche!	LREM	11,688	25.41	17,694	47.21
Jean Lassalle	Miscellaneous Right	DVD	8,145	17.71	19,787	52.79
Bernard Uthurry	Socialist Party	PS	5,808	12.63		
Marc Oxibar	The Republicans	LR	4,443	9.66		
Anita Lopepe	Regionalist	REG	3,912	8.51		
Didier Bayens	La France Insoumise	FI	3,529	7.67		
Laurent Inchauspé	Union of Democrats and Independents	UDI	2,494	5.42		
Gilles Hustaix	National Front	FN	1,970	4.28		
Robert Bareille	Communist Party	PCF	1,540	3.35		
Véronique Zenoni	Ecologist	ECO	1,236	2.69		
Bernard Arrabit	Regionalist	REG	648	1.41		
Véronique Dazord	Debout la France	DLF	282	0.61		
Lucile Souche	Far Left	EXG	187	0.41		
François-Xavier Dattin	Independent	DIV	114	0.25		
Total			45,996	100%	37,481	100%
Registered voters			80,185		80,161	
Blank/Void ballots			939	2.00%	5,299	12.39%
Turnout			46,935	58.53%	42,780	53.37%
Abstentions			33,250	41.47%	37,381	46.63%
Result					DVD GAIN FROM MoDEM	

=== 2012 ===
Results of the 10 June and 17 June 2012 French National Assembly election in Pyrénées-Atlantiques’ 4th Constituency
Candidate	Party		1st round		2nd round	
Candidate	Party		Votes	%	Votes	%
François Maitia	Socialist Party	PS	16,418	31.99	24,664	49.02
Jean Lassalle	Democratic Movement	MoDem	13,488	26.28	25,655	50.98
Marc Oxibar	Union for a Popular Movement	UMP	9,047	17.63		
Robert Bareille	Left Front	FG	3,921	7.64		
Anita Lopepe	Regionalist	REG	3,492	6.80		
Catherine Boutelant-Jeser	National Front	FN	2,285	4.45		
Alice Leiciaguecahar	The Greens	LV	1,165	2.27		
Pako Arizmendi	Regionalist	REG	456	0.89		
Eric Petetin	Ecologist	ECO	278	0.54		
Danielle Schaff	Miscellaneous Right	DVD	247	0.48		
Thierry Buisson	Ecologist	ECO	226	0.44		
Pedro Carrasquedo	Far Left	EXG	193	0.38		
Berthe Ratsimba	Far Left	EXG	107	0.21		
Total			51,323	100%	50,319	100%
Registered voters			80,345		80,336	
Blank/Void ballots			873	1.67%	2,840	5.34%
Turnout			52,196	64.96%	53,159	66.17%
Abstentions			28,149	35.04%	27,177	33.83%
Result					MoDEM HOLD	

=== 2007 ===
Results of the 10 June and 17 June 2007 French National Assembly election in Pyrénées-Atlantiques’ 4th Constituency
Candidate	Party		1st round		2nd round	
Candidate	Party		Votes	%	Votes	%
Hervé Lucbereilh	Union for a Popular Movement	UMP	17,009	31.36	18,997	33.65
Jean Lassalle	UDF-Democratic Movement	UDF-MoDem	16,020	29.54	22,803	40.39
Jean-Pierre Domecq	Socialist Party	PS	10,773	19,86	14,657	25.96
Marie-Léonie Aguergaray	Regionalist	REG	3,430	6.32		
Louis Labadot	Communist Party	PCF	2,367	4.36		
Bernard Sicre	Hunting, Fishing, Nature and Traditions	CPNT	1,191	2.20		
Jenofa Cuisset	The Greens	LV	1,063	1.96		
Jean Haïra	Far Left	EXG	832	1.53		
Hélène Barbace	National Front	FN	606	1.12		
Jean-Marie Puyau	Independent	DIV	303	0.56		
Jean-Claude Laborde	Ecologist	ECO	298	0.55		
Berthe Ratsimba	Far Left	EXG	218	0.40		
Thierry Richard	Independent	DIV	127	0.23		
Total			54,237	100%	56,457	100%
Registered voters			80,284		80,289	
Blank/Void ballots			919	1.67%	1,304	2.26%
Turnout			55,156	68.70%	57,761	71.94%
Abstentions			25,128	31.30%	22,528	28.06%
Result					UDF-MoDem HOLD	

=== 2002 ===
Results of the 9 June and 16 June 2002 French National Assembly election in Pyrénées-Atlantiques’ 4th Constituency
Candidate	Party		1st round		2nd round	
Candidate	Party		Votes	%	Votes	%
Francois Maitia	Socialist Party	PS	13,767	25.51	22,182	42.95
Jean Lassalle	Union for French Democracy	UDF	13,018	24.13	29,460	57.05
Louis Althape	Union for a Presidential Majority	UMP	12,346	22.88		
J. Jacques Cazaurang	Hunting, Fishing, Nature and Traditions	CPNT	3,356	6.22		
Pierre Iralour	Regionalist	REG	2,894	5.36		
Louis Labadot	Communist Party	PCF	2,529	4.69		
Lucien Garondi	National Front	FN	1,903	3.53		
Genevieve Cuisset	The Greens	LV	1,106	2.05		
Roger Desport	Far Right	EXD	910	1.69		
Francis Charpentier	Revolutionary Communist League	LCR	788	1.46		
Pierre Etchepare	Regionalist	REG	449	0.83		
Berthe Ratsimba	Workers’ Struggle	LO	386	0.72		
Thierry Labaquere Dit Barocq	National Republican Movement	MNR	257	0.48		
Marcel Mignot	Movement for France	MPF	248	0.46		
Maite Goyenetche	Regionalist	REG	14	0.03		
Total			53,971	100%	51,642	100%
Registered voters			78,915		78,911	
Blank/Void ballots			1,354	2.45%	2,329	4.32%
Turnout			55,325	70.11%	53,971	68.39%
Abstentions			23,590	29.89%	24,940	31.61%
Result					UDF GAIN FROM RPR	

== Sources ==
- French Interior Ministry results website: "Résultats électoraux officiels en France" (in French).
