= Dordogne's 2nd constituency =

Constituency of the National Assembly of France

- Constituency for the National Assembly
- Boundary of Dordogne's 2nd constituency in Dordogne

- Location of Dordogne within France
- Department: Dordogne
- Region: Nouvelle-Aquitaine
- Population: 109,506 (2013)
- Electorate: 82,415 (2017)

Current constituency
- Deputy: Serge Muller
- Political party: RN
- Parliamentary group: RN

Dordogne's 2nd constituency is one of four French legislative constituencies in the department of Dordogne. It is currently represented by Serge Muller of National Rally (RN).

== Historic representation ==
Legislature	Start of mandate	End of mandate	Deputy	Party
1st	9 December 1958	9 October 1962	Henri Sicard	UNR
2nd	6 December 1962	2 April 1967	Louis Pimont	DVG
3rd	3 April 1967	30 May 1968	Louis Pimont	SFIO
4th	11 July 1968	1 April 1973	Jean Capelle	DVD
5th	2 April 1973	9 November 1975	Louis Pimont	PS
5th	10 November 1975	2 April 1978	Raoul Jarry	PS
6th	3 April 1978	28 September 1980	Michel Manet	PS
6th	29 September 1980	29 November 1980	Vacant	
6th	30 November 1980	22 May 1981	Michel Suchod	PS
7th	2 July 1981	1 April 1986	Michel Suchod	PS
8th	2 April 1986	14 May 1988	Proportional representation	
9th	23 June 1988	1 April 1993	Michel Suchod	PS
10th	2 April 1993	21 April 1997	Daniel Garrigue	RPR
11th	12 June 1997	18 June 2002	Michel Suchod	MDC
12th	19 June 2002	19 June 2007	Daniel Garrigue	UMP
13th	20 June 2007	19 June 2012	Daniel Garrigue	UMP
14th	20 June 2012	20 June 2017	Brigitte Allain	EELV
15th	21 June 2017	21 June 2022	Michel Delpon	LREM
16th	22 June 2022	9 June 2024	Serge Muller	RN
17th	7 July 2024	ongoing	Serge Muller	RN

== Elections ==
=== 2024 ===
Candidate	Party	Alliance	First round			Second round		
Candidate	Party	Alliance	Votes	%	+/–	Votes	%	+/–
Serge Muller	RN		24,374	42.71	+18.94	28,256	52.05	+1.61
Christophe Cathus	PS	NFP	16,131	28.27	+7.08	26,027	47.95	new
Michel Delpon	RE	ENS	11,173	19.58	-2.47	WITHDREW		
Josie Bayle	LR		4,574	8.01	+1.20			
Lise Khelfaoui	LO		816	1.43	+0.43			
Votes			57,068	100.00		54,283	100.00	
Valid votes			57,068	96.63	-0.87	54,283	91.34	+3.05
Blank votes			1,134	1.92	+0.42	3,402	5.72	-2.49
Null votes			857	1.45	+0.45	1,745	2.94	-1.00
Turnout			59,059	70.07	+17.14	59,430	70.50	+19.92
Abstentions			25,227	29.93	-17.14	24,863	29.50	-19.92
Registered voters			84,286			84,293		
Result						TBD		

=== 2022 ===
Legislative Election 2022: Dordogne's 2nd constituency
Party	Candidate	Votes	%	±%
RN	Serge Muller	10,338	23.77	+7.82
LREM (Ensemble)	Michel Delpon	9,591	22.05	-12.68
LFI (NUPÉS)	Michèle Roux	9,214	21.19	−9.10
PS	Christophe Cathus*	6,384	14.68	N/A
LR (UDC)	Aurélien Delfour	2,961	6.81	−7.04
REC	Nathalie Ballerand	2,149	4.94	N/A
LMR	Amandine Legros	985	2.27	N/A
Others	N/A	1,865	4.29	
Turnout		43,487	52.93	−0.39
2nd round result
RN	Serge Muller	18,891	50.44	+16.76
LREM (Ensemble)	Michel Delpon	18,561	49.56	−16.76
Turnout		37,452	50.58	+3.33
RN gain from LREM				

=== 2017 ===
Candidate	Label	First round		Second round	
Candidate	Label	Votes	%	Votes	%
Michel Delpon	REM	14,844	34.73	22,317	66.32
Robert Dubois	FN	6,816	15.95	11,331	33.68
Gaëlle Blanc-Lajonie	LR	5,922	13.85		
Brigitte Allain	ECO	5,105	11.94		
Chrystel Boutillier	FI	4,702	11.00		
Armand Zaccaron	PCF	3,142	7.35		
Magali Jimenez	ECO	829	1.94		
Robert Richard	DLF	715	1.67		
Éric Mercier	DIV	363	0.85		
Sandrine Ruchot	EXG	278	0.65		
Éric Villemagne	EXD	29	0.07		
Votes		42,745	100.00	33,648	100.00
Valid votes		42,745	97.23	33,648	86.41
Blank votes		800	1.82	3,711	9.53
Null votes		416	0.95	1,582	4.06
Turnout		43,961	53.32	38,941	47.25
Abstentions		38,486	46.68	43,474	52.75
Registered voters		82,447		82,415	
Source: Ministry of the Interior

=== 2012 ===
2012 legislative election in Dordogne's 2nd constituency
Candidate	Party	First round		Second round	
Candidate	Party	Votes	%	Votes	%
Dominique Mortemousque	UMP	11,144	22.11%	22,247	46.81%
Brigitte Allain	EELV–PS	8,223	16.31%	25,284	53.19%
Armand Zaccaron	FG	7,793	15.46%		
Béatrice Patrie	DVG (PRG	7,383	14.65%		
Robert Dubois	FN	7,238	14.36%		
Daniel Garrigue		7,004	13.89%		
Sabine Robert	AEI	621	1.23%		
Michel Delpon		537	1.07%		
Bernard Albrigo	NPA	324	0.64%		
Sandrine Ruchot	LO	145	0.29%		
Valid votes		50,412	98.30%	47,531	94.49%
Spoilt and null votes		872	1.70%	2,570	5.11%
Votes cast / turnout		51,284	63.21%	50,303	62.02%
Abstentions		29,844	36.79%	30,806	37.98%
Registered voters		81,128	100.00%	81,109	100.00%
