= Dordogne's 3rd constituency =

Constituency of the National Assembly of France

- Constituency for the National Assembly
- Boundary of Dordogne's 3rd constituency in Dordogne

- Location of Dordogne within France
- Department: Dordogne
- Region: Nouvelle-Aquitaine
- Population: 88,639 (2013)
- Electorate: 67,406 (2017)

Current constituency
- Deputy: Florence Joubert
- Political party: RN

Dordogne's 3rd constituency is one of four French legislative constituencies in the department of Dordogne. It is currently represented by Florence Joubert of the National Rally (RN).

== Historic representation ==
Legislature	Start of mandate	End of mandate	Deputy	Party
1st	9 December 1958	9 October 1962	Georges Bonnet	DVD
2nd	6 December 1962	2 April 1967	Georges Bonnet	DVD
3rd	3 April 1967	30 May 1968	Georges Bonnet	PRRS
4th	11 July 1968	1 April 1973	Pierre Beylot	UDR
5th	2 April 1973	2 April 1978	Alain Bonnet	MRG
6th	3 April 1978	22 May 1981	Alain Bonnet	MRG
7th	2 July 1981	1 April 1986	Alain Bonnet	MRG
8th	2 April 1986	14 May 1988	Proportional representation	
9th	23 June 1988	1 April 1993	Alain Bonnet	MRG
10th	2 April 1993	21 April 1997	Frédéric de Saint-Sernin	RPR
11th	12 June 1997	18 June 2002	René Dutin	PCF
12th	19 June 2002	14 May 2004	Frédéric de Saint-Sernin	UMP
12th	15 May 2004	19 June 2007	Bernard Mazouaud	UMP
13th	20 June 2007	6 March 2008	Michel Debet	PS
13th	7 March 2008	19 June 2012	Colette Langlade	PS
14th	20 June 2012	20 June 2017	Colette Langlade	PS
15th	21 June 2017	21 June 2022	Jean-Pierre Cubertafon	MoDem
16th	22 June 2022	9 June 2024	Jean-Pierre Cubertafon	MoDem
17th	7 July 2024	ongoing	Florence Joubert	RN

== Elections ==
=== 2024 ===
Candidate	Party	Alliance	First round			Second round		
Candidate	Party	Alliance	Votes	%	+/–	Votes	%	+/–
Florence Joubert	RN		19,093	40.13	+17.67	22,589	50.08	+20.70
Christelle Druillole	PS	NFP	13,600	28.58	+4.90	22,514	49.92	+15.82
Jean-Pierre Cubertafon	MoDem	ENS	11,103	23.33	+0.02	WITHDREW		
Myriam Thomasson	LR		3,104	6.52	+0.80			
Jacques Decoupy	LO		681	1.43	+0.38			
Votes			47,581	100.00		45,103	100.00	
Valid votes			47,581	96.17	±0.00	45,103	90.41	-5.62
Blank votes			995	2.01	-0.40	3,095	6.20	+3.82
Null votes			898	1.82	+0.40	1,688	3.38	+1.79
Turnout			49,474	73.90	+15.64	49,886	74.51	+14.06
Abstentions			17,473	26.10	-15.64	17,065	25.49	-14.06
Registered voters			66,947			66,951		
Result						RN GAIN FROM MoDEM		

=== 2022 ===
Legislative Election 2022: Dordogne's 3rd constituency
Party	Candidate	Votes	%	±%
LFI (NUPÉS)	Cyril Girardeau	8,937	23.68	-16.36
MoDem (Ensemble)	Jean-Pierre Cubertafon	8,796	23.31	-7.18
RN	Florence Joubert	8,477	22.46	+11.45
PS	Martial Peyrouny*	3,615	9.58	N/A
LREM	Guillaume Gardillou**	2,291	6.07	N/A
LR (UDC)	Myriam Thomasson	2,160	5.72	−9.35
REC	Antoine Coutou	1,358	3.60	N/A
Others	N/A	2,108	5.59	
Turnout		37,742	58.26	−1.73
2nd round result
MoDem (Ensemble)	Jean-Pierre Cubertafon	14,284	36.52	-14.48
LFI (NUPÉS)	Cyril Girardeau	13,335	34.10	−14.90
RN	Florence Joubert	11,491	29.38	N/A
Turnout		39,110	60.45	+4.87
MoDem hold				

=== 2017 ===
Candidate	Label	First round		Second round	
Candidate	Label	Votes	%	Votes	%
Jean-Pierre Cubertafon	MoDem	11,899	30.49	16,678	51.00
Colette Langlade	PS	8,950	22.93	16,021	49.00
Isabelle Hyvoz	LR	5,881	15.07		
Philippe Guillerme	FI	5,340	13.68		
Michel Bergougnoux	FN	4,298	11.01		
Jean-Paul Salon	PCF	1,339	3.43		
Patrick Volker	DLF	644	1.65		
Anaïs Lagarde	DIV	368	0.94		
Jacques Decoupy	EXG	309	0.79		
Votes		39,028	100.00	32,699	100.00
Valid votes		39,028	96.46	32,699	87.28
Blank votes		975	2.41	2,946	7.86
Null votes		456	1.13	1,821	4.86
Turnout		40,459	59.99	37,466	55.58
Abstentions		26,981	40.01	29,940	44.42
Registered voters		67,440		67,406	
Source: Ministry of the Interior

=== 2012 ===
Colette Langlade was elected in the first round, since she received over 50% of the vote, and the turn-out was high enough.

2012 legislative election in Dordogne's 3rd constituency
Candidate	Party	First round	
Candidate	Party	Votes	%
Colette Langlade	PS	23,584	51.74%
Marie-Claude Abbes	UMP	11,077	24.30%
Dominique Halbout Du Tanney	FN	4,248	9.32%
Jean-Paul Salon	FG	3,472	7.62%
Jean-Michel Faure	PR	1,508	3.31%
Nadège Ravidat	EELV	1,138	2.50%
Vesna Lazarevic	AEI	335	0.73%
Jacques Decoupy	LO	217	0.48%
Valid votes		45,579	97.79%
Spoilt and null votes		1,030	2.21%
Votes cast / turnout		46,609	67.57%
Abstentions		22,371	32.43%
Registered voters		68,980	100.00%
