= Iñaki Echaniz =

French politician (born 1993)

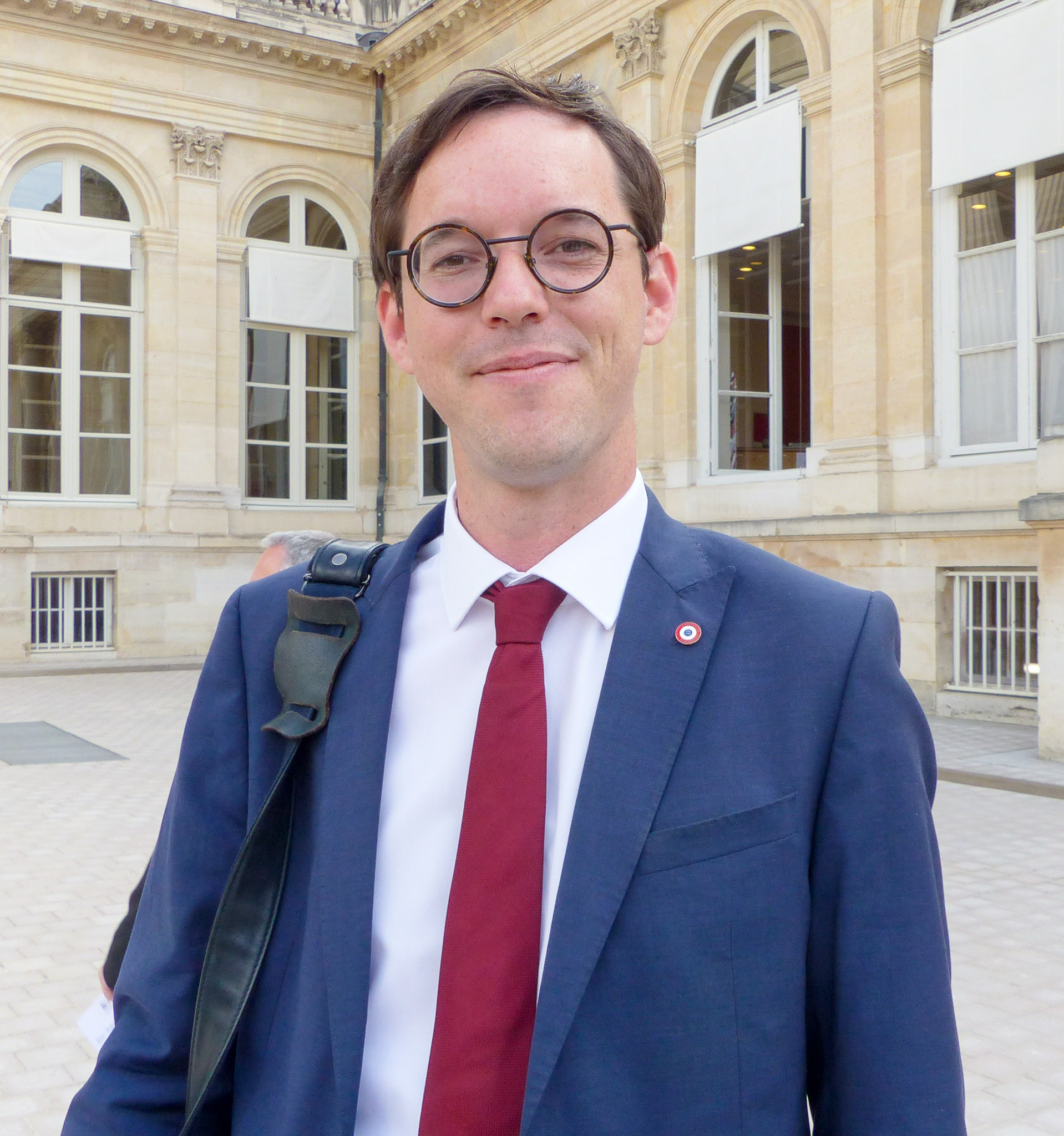

Member of the National Assembly for the Pyrénées-Atlantiques's 4th constituency
- Incumbent
- Assumed office 22 June 2022
- Preceded by: Jean Lassalle

Personal details
- Born: 2 September 1993 (age 32) Oloron-Sainte-Marie, France
- Party: Socialist Party
- Other political affiliations: NUPES

Iñaki Echaniz (born 2 September 1993) is a French politician from the Socialist Party who has represented Pyrénées-Atlantiques's 4th constituency in the National Assembly since 2022.

== Early life ==
Echaniz's background comes from his Basque grandparents, originally from Azpeitia and Beasain in Gipuzkoa (Southern Basque Country, Spain). They came to settle in Oloron-Sainte-Marie in 1968. The ñ in his forename has been forbidden by a decree issued in 2014, which affects some Basque as well as Breton forenames. So in French Parliament this letter has been wiped out.

== Political career ==
In parliament, Echaniz is part of the Socialist group and serves on the Cultural and Education Affairs Committee.

In 2023, Echaniz publicly endorsed the re-election of the Socialist Party's chairman Olivier Faure.

== See also ==
- List of deputies of the 16th National Assembly of France
