= Jean-Pierre Cubertafon =

French politician (born 1948)

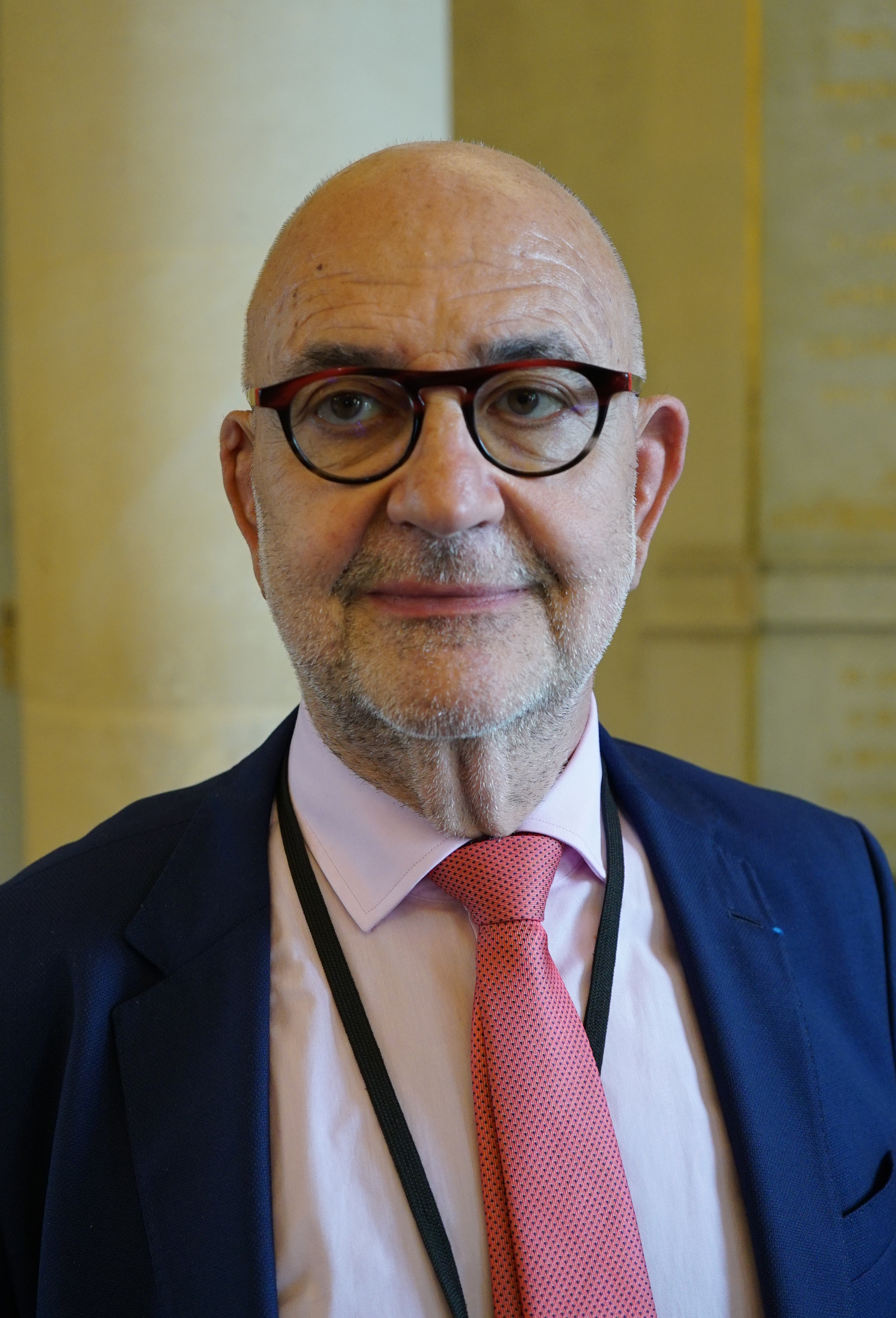
- Cubertafon in July 2017

Member of the National Assembly for Dordogne's 3rd constituency
- In office 21 June 2017 – 9 June 2024
- Preceded by: Colette Langlade
- Succeeded by: Florence Joubert

Mayor of Lanouaille
- In office 18 June 1995 – 31 July 2017
- Preceded by: Jane Lataste
- Succeeded by: Jean-Christophe Boulanger

Personal details
- Born: Jean-Pierre Louis Cubertafon; 5 February 1948 (age 78) Lanouaille, France
- Party: Democratic Movement
- Other political affiliations: Rally for the Republic (formerly); Union for French Democracy (formerly)

Jean-Pierre Louis Cubertafon (French pronunciation: [ʒɑ̃pjɛʁ kybɛʁtafɔ̃]; born 5 February 1948) is a French politician of the Democratic Movement (MoDem) who represented the 3rd constituency of the Dordogne department in the National Assembly from 2017 to 2024.

== Political career ==
Cubertafon was first elected a municipal councillor of Lanouaille in 1977. He was elected to the mayorship in 1995. He is formerly affiliated with the Rally for the Republic and the Union for French Democracy.

In the 2017 legislative election he contested Dordogne's 3rd constituency for the Democratic Movement and defeated outgoing Socialist deputy Colette Langlade with 51% of the second-round vote to take the seat. In Parliament, he served on the Committee on National Defence and the Armed Forces. In addition to his committee assignment, he was part of the French-Armenian Parliamentary Friendship Group, the French-Bolivian Parliamentary Friendship Group and the French-Moroccan Parliamentary Friendship Group.

In 2020, Cubertafon ran for the Senate in Dordogne but was defeated by Communist Marie-Claude Varaillas with 46.9% of the second-round vote. In 2022 he ran for reelection and placed second in the first round behind the Independent Workers' Party candidate. He won the second round with just 36.2% of the vote in a triangular election, as the National Rally candidate had qualified as well.

In 2021, Cubertafon received anonymous death threats.

In the 2024 snap election, he placed third in the first round with 23.3% of the vote and withdrew ahead of the second round. In 2025, Prime Minister François Bayrou tasked him with a six-month mission "to assess the situation of loneliness and isolation in rural areas, to identify and evaluate public policies on the matter, and to formulate concrete recommendations to address it".

== Honours ==
- Knight of the Legion of Honour (2025)
- Knight of the Ordre national du Mérite (2014)
