= Rural Alliance =

The Rural Alliance (French: Alliance rurale) was a list of candidates that stood in the 2024 European elections in France. The organisation was founded in 2023.

The list included representatives of different political parties, including Résistons. It includes personalities such as Jean Lassalle (president of Résistons), Denise Leiboff (president of the National Federation of Pastoral Communes) and Willy Schraen (president of the National Federation of Hunters). Their three main campaign issues were agriculture, culture and immigration. The party wants the wolf to no longer be considered a protected species. It is also in favor of a "10-year moratorium on the banning of molecules" to have time to find alternatives or even for the elimination of inheritance rights "for the transfer of farms".

Although he was asked to be included in list, famous chef Pierre Gagnaire did not participate.

During the vote on 9 June 2024, the list achieved 582,894 votes, or 2.35%. It did not obtain any seats in the European Parliament.

== See also ==
- Party lists in the 2024 European election in France
