= Jean Lassalle =

French politician turned stand-up comedian (born 1955)

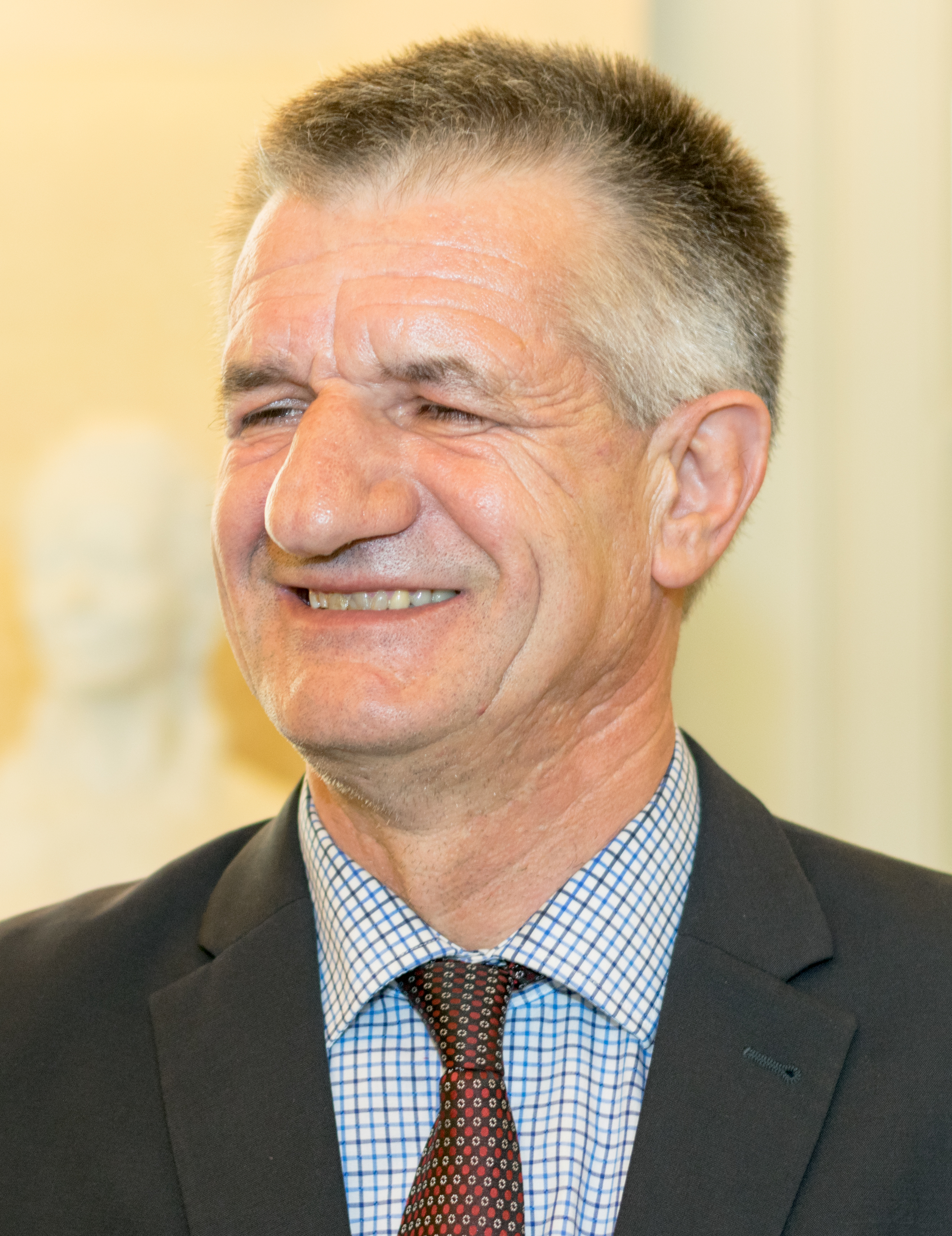
- Lassalle in 2017

Member of the National Assembly for Pyrénées-Atlantiques's 4th constituency
- In office 16 June 2002 – 21 June 2022
- Preceded by: Michel Inchauspé
- Succeeded by: Iñaki Echaniz

Mayor of Lourdios-Ichère
- In office 26 March 1977 – 16 July 2017

Personal details
- Born: 3 May 1955 (age 71) Lourdios-Ichère, France
- Party: Résistons! (2016–present)
- Other political affiliations: Union for French Democracy (until 2007); Democratic Movement (2007–2016)

Jean Lassalle (French pronunciation: [ʒɑ̃ lasal]; Occitan: Jan de Lassala Occitan pronunciation: [ˈd͡ʒan də lasala]; born 3 May 1955) is a French politician who represented the 4th constituency of the Pyrénées-Atlantiques department in the National Assembly from 2002 to 2022. A former member of the Democratic Movement (MoDem), he was a candidate in the 2017 presidential election, in which he received 435,301 votes (1.21%). Lassalle ran under the banner of Résistons! (RES), a party he founded and has led since he left the MoDem in 2016. In the 2022 presidential election he received 1.3 million votes constituting over 3% of those cast.

== Political career ==
Lassalle, who held the mayorship of the commune of Lourdios-Ichère from 1977 to 2017, also sat on the General Council of Pyrénées-Atlantiques from 1982 to 2015, elected in the canton of Accous. He was one of the general council's vice presidents from 1991 to 2001 under François Bayrou.

Lassalle was elected to the National Assembly in the 2002 legislative election, where he represents Pyrénées-Atlantiques's 4th constituency. Since 2002 Lassalle has led the World Mountain People Association, an international network of mountain-dwellers active in more than 70 countries. He also leads a Haut-Béarn cultural association.

On 3 June 2003 Lassalle stood up in the National Assembly during questions to Minister of the Interior Nicolas Sarkozy and sang the Occitan anthem Se Canta in protest at an announcement by Sarkozy concerning the housing of 23 gendarmes tasked with guarding the Somport tunnel, which links France with Spain through the Pyrenees. The village closest to the French end of the tunnel is Urdos, but it was announced that the gendarmes would be housed in the nearby town of Oloron-Sainte-Marie, on the grounds that their wives would become bored in Urdos. As he explained in an interview with France 3 later that day, Lassalle took exception to what he saw as a slur on the Pyrenean village and decided to interrupt the minister with his song. The protest was met by laughter from other deputies, disapproval from the President of the National Assembly and bemusement from Sarkozy.

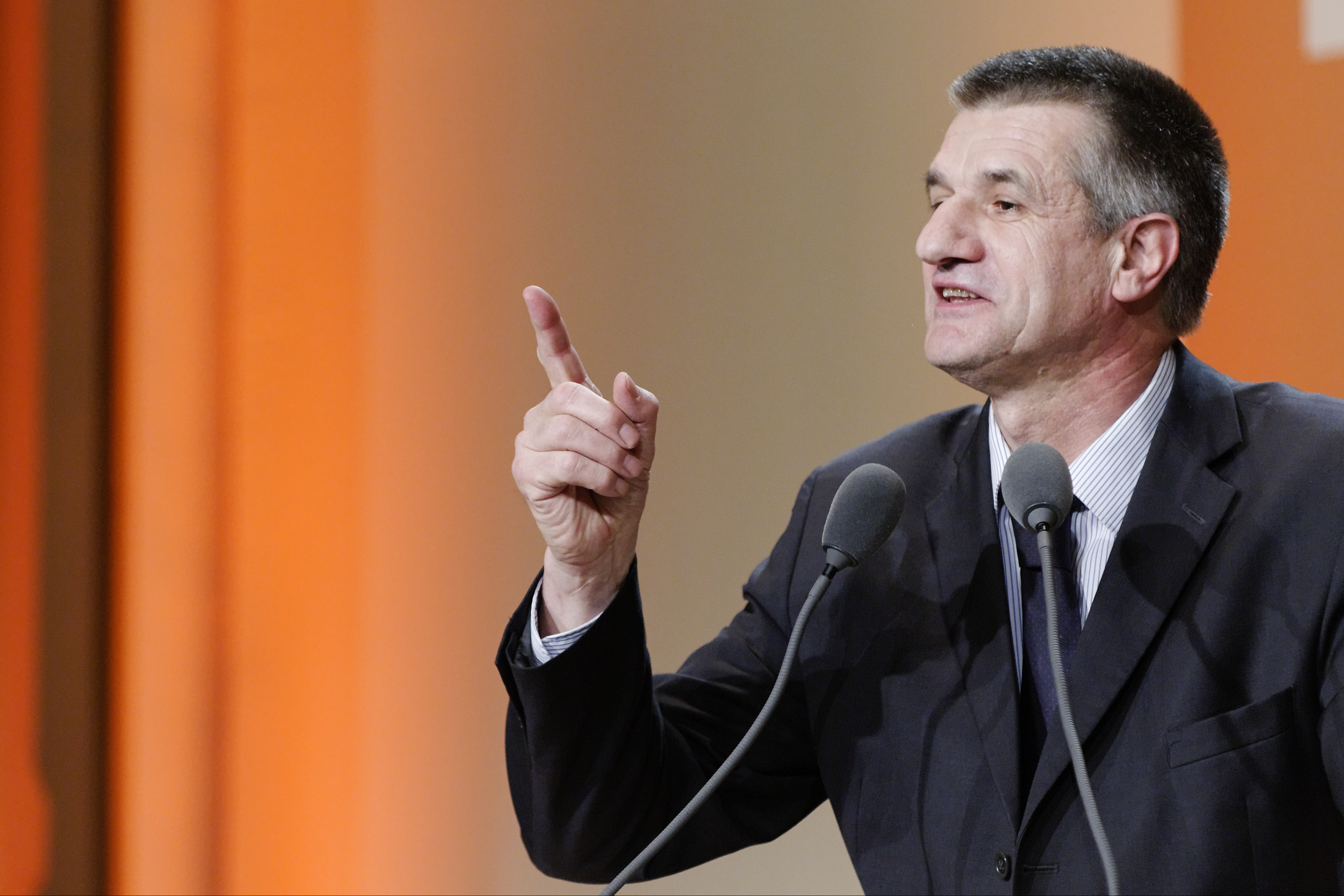
Lassalle at a MoDem campaign event for the upcoming regional elections, 24 January 2010

In 2013, Lassalle walked around France for eight months from April to December to meet people. He was afterwards quoted, "Everywhere I went I witnessed a crisis in the standard of living, a loss of identity and the loss of a sense of a common destiny". He found the situation equally bad in the cities and the countryside. Scepticism about globalisation, distrust of politicians and latent racism were common among people he spoke to, he said.

=== Hunger strike ===
Lassalle undertook a 39-day hunger strike in March and April 2006, in protest at a threat to jobs in his constituency. Japanese firm Toyal, which owned a paint factory near Accous in the Vallée d'Aspe and employed 150 of Lassalle's constituents, announced plans to open a factory 60 km away. The firm claimed that this relocation of its investment would not result in the closure of the Accous site, but Lassalle's concerns were not assuaged and he embarked on a hunger strike on 7 March.

The strike ended on 14 April, when Toyal offered an assurance to Minister of the Interior Nicolas Sarkozy that the factory would not close and that it would continue investment in the area before expanding elsewhere. Earlier the same day, Lassalle had been admitted to hospital in Garches, in the western suburbs of Paris, prompting intervention by President Jacques Chirac, Prime Minister Dominique de Villepin and Sarkozy. Lassalle had lost 21 kilograms (46 lb) of weight over the course of the strike.

=== 2017 presidential campaign ===
In 2017, Lassalle ran for President of France. He received support from the Association des maires ruraux de France (Association of rural mayors of France). His platform was centre-right, with tenets of agrarianism, protectionism and ecological preservation. His campaign spots included, among other things, him mowing his lawn shirtless. In the 4 April 2017 televised debate on BFM TV, he introduced himself as the "son of a shepherd, brother of a shepherd, [former shepherd] myself". After he arrived late at the television studio, several news outlets took a critical stance at his performance. However, following the debate he quickly became the most searched candidate on Google.

Lassalle ultimately received 435,301 votes, 1.21% of the electorate, which ranked him seventh out of eleven candidates. Lassalle's support disproportionately came from rural and southwest constituencies. His campaign cost €230,000, the least of any candidate. The bank from which he borrowed the money took his credit card as a guarantee, forcing his mother-in-law to provide groceries for the family during Lassalle's campaign.

=== Aftermath of the 2017 election ===
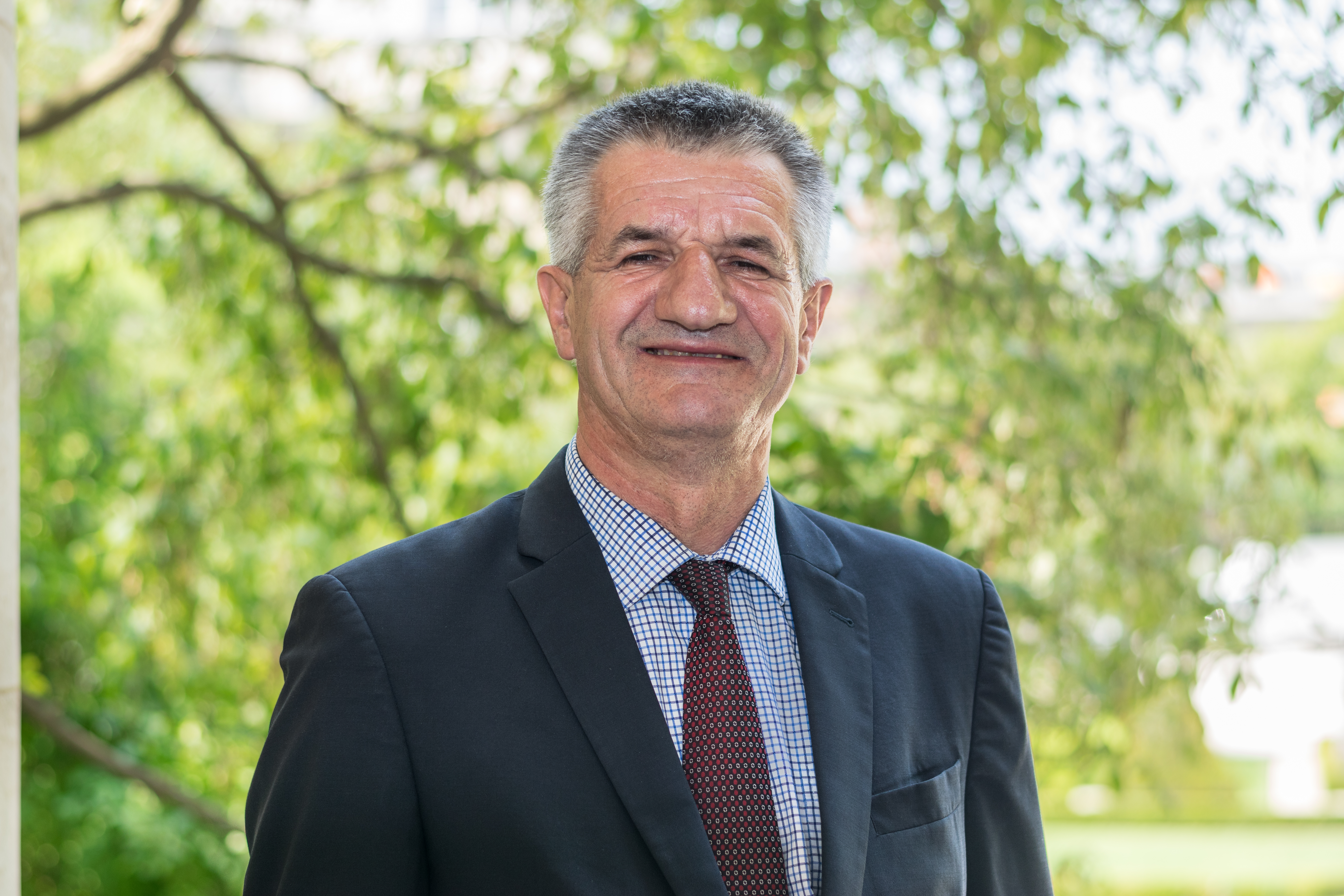
Lassalle in the Palais Bourbon's Jardin des Quatre-Colonnes on the first day of the 15th National Assembly, 21 June 2017

In the 2017 legislative election, Résistons! fielded 21 parliamentary candidates, but only Lassalle was elected. In a 2017 interview with Jean-Jacques Bourdin, Lassalle stated President Emmanuel Macron had offered him to be Minister of Territorial Cohesion but he turned the offer down, citing policy differences.

In November 2018, Lassalle disrupted the National Assembly by wearing a yellow vest in solidarity with the yellow vest movement, resulting in a €1,500 fine. Lassalle explored a candidacy for the 2019 European Parliament election, on a platform of Eurosceptism and "a Europe of nations and peoples", but ultimately did not stand in that election, citing financial difficulties.

=== 2022 presidential campaign ===
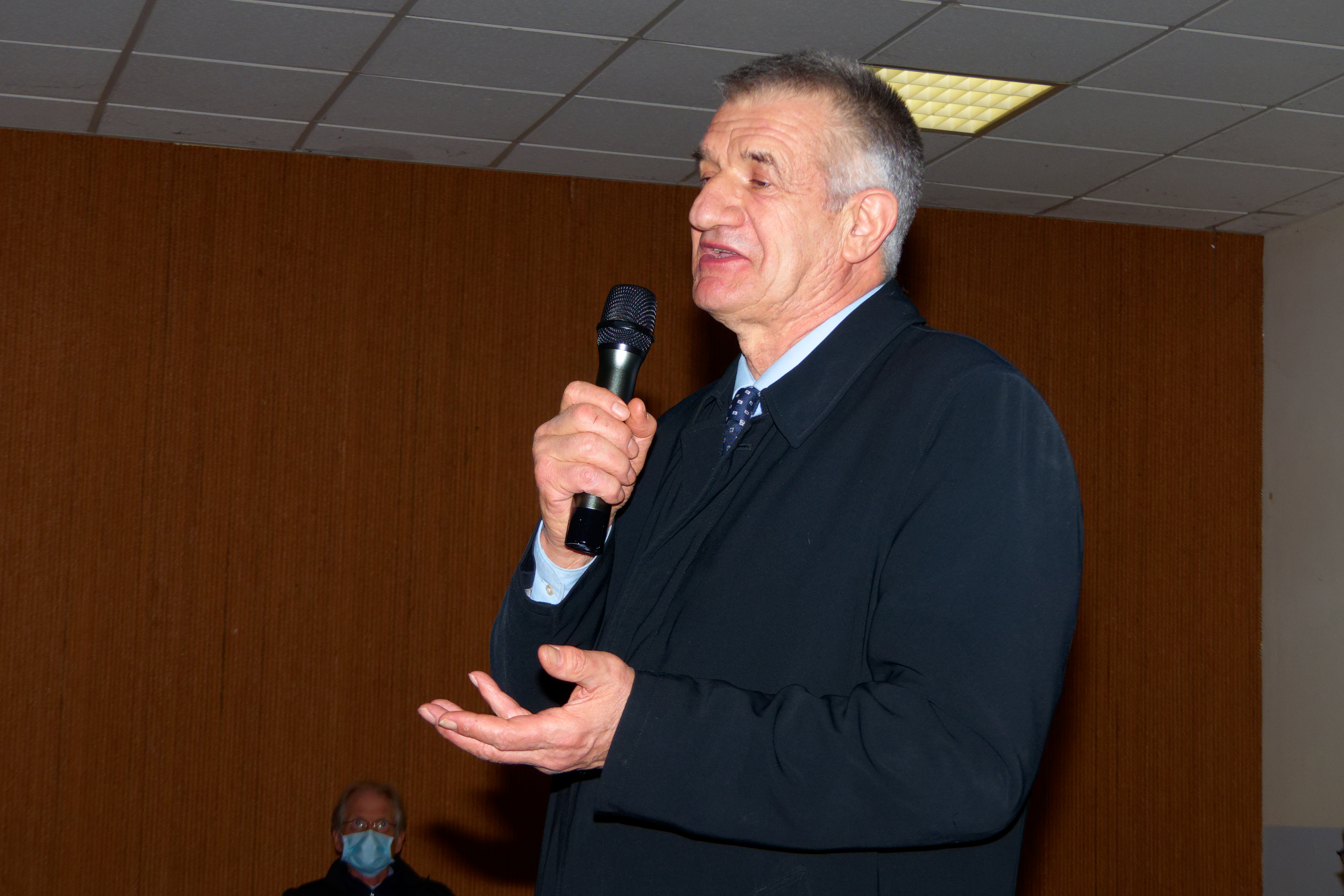
Lassalle campaigning for the presidency in Onans, Doubs, 11 February 2022

On 16 March 2021, Lassalle stated his intention to run again for the presidency in the 2022 presidential election. The Constitutional Council approved his second presidential candidacy on 17 February 2022. In early 2022, Lassalle appeared doubtful about his prospects, as he said: "Macron will be reelected as things stand. The financial powers that have taken over our country have already decided that". A few days later, he publicly stated he was thinking about withdrawing his candidacy for the presidency, citing a lack of sufficient media coverage. He openly criticised his treatment in mainstream media after he failed to be invited to a political evening show on TF1. Lassalle ultimately received just over 3 percent of the vote, a significant improvement over his 2017 showing, with his strongest support coming from Corsica, Nouvelle-Aquitaine and Occitanie. Consequently, it is also in Occitania that his party will have the most candidates in the legislative elections.

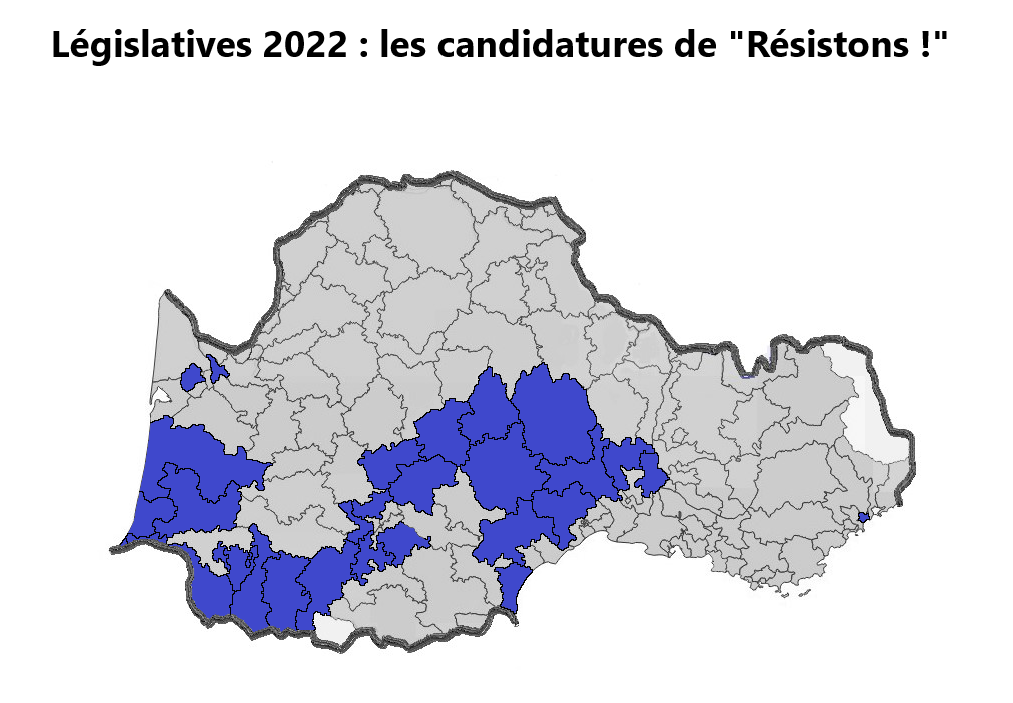
"Résistons!" (Jean Lassalle) candidatures in Occitania during the 2022 French parliamentary elections

Lassalle received more votes than Socialist Party candidate Anne Hidalgo. He made no endorsement in the second round, saying he trusts the French people to do what is right. On the day of the vote, he published a video recorded at the polling station in Lourdios-Ichère in which he acts as if he is about to vote, then retracts and stated his refusal to participate in the vote. In doing so, he violated the French electoral code, which prohibits "messages of an electoral propaganda nature on the eve and on election day", leading to all ballots in Lourdios-Ichère being invalidated.

He did not run in the 2022 French legislative election, instead endorsing his brother for the seat, which was ultimately won by Socialist Party candidate Iñaki Echaniz.

Lassalle ran in the 2024 European Parliament election, where his Rural Alliance list received 2.35% of the vote, falling short of the 5% threshold required to gain seats.

He ran in the 2024 snap legislative election to reclaim his former seat but came third in both rounds of voting, losing to the incumbent, Iñaki Echaniz.

== Personal life ==
Lassalle was born in Lourdios-Ichère, Pyrénées-Atlantiques. Son of an Occitan shepherd, he is trained as an agricultural technician but got involved in politics very early, becoming at the age of 21 mayor of his native village.

His son Thibault Lassalle is a rugby union player. He was a member of the French U19 team taking part in the 2006 U19 World Championships in Dubai, in which France reached the semi-final.

On 20 September 2020, Lassalle accidentally parked his car on a level crossing that later obstructed a passenger train, which was reported on by multiple news outlets. He later apologized for the incident, which caused a short train delay.

== Works ==
- Un berger à l'Elysée. La Différence. 2016. ISBN 9782729122867. OCLC 961406166.
- Résistons !. La Différence. 2017. ISBN 9782729123383. OCLC 1005727877.
- Aurore ou crépuscule. Le Cherche midi. 2020. ISBN 9782729123383. OCLC 1202704024.
- La France authentique. Éditions Glyphe. 2022. ISBN 9782352851417. OCLC 1306629744.
