= Florence Joubert =

French politician (born 1965)

Member of the French National Assembly for Dordogne's 3rd constituency
- Incumbent
- Assumed office 18 July 2024
- Preceded by: Jean-Pierre Cubertafon

Personal details
- Born: 30 June 1965 (age 59); Reims
- Political party: National Rally (2014-present)

Florence Joubert (born 30 June 1965) is a French politician of the National Rally. She was elected member of the National Assembly for Dordogne's 3rd constituency in 2024.

== Career ==
Joubert worked as a school teacher in Paris before moving to the Dordogne in 1995 where she founded a house restoration business. She first joined the National Rally in 2014 and later became a parliamentary assistant to Serge Muller.

For the 2024 French legislative election, she was selected as the RN's candidate for Dordogne's 3rd constituency. At this time, the centre-left newspaper Libération alleged that Joubert had previously made a number of controversial social media posts in 2020 on immigrants and the COVID-19 vaccine. During the election campaign, her opponent Christelle Druillole of the New Popular Front filed a complaint after Joubert produced a leaflet arguing that the left-wing coalition supported "violence, hatred of the police, hatred of Jews." The case was subsequently dropped. Joubert was elected to the constituency on the second round.
