= Colette Langlade =

French politician

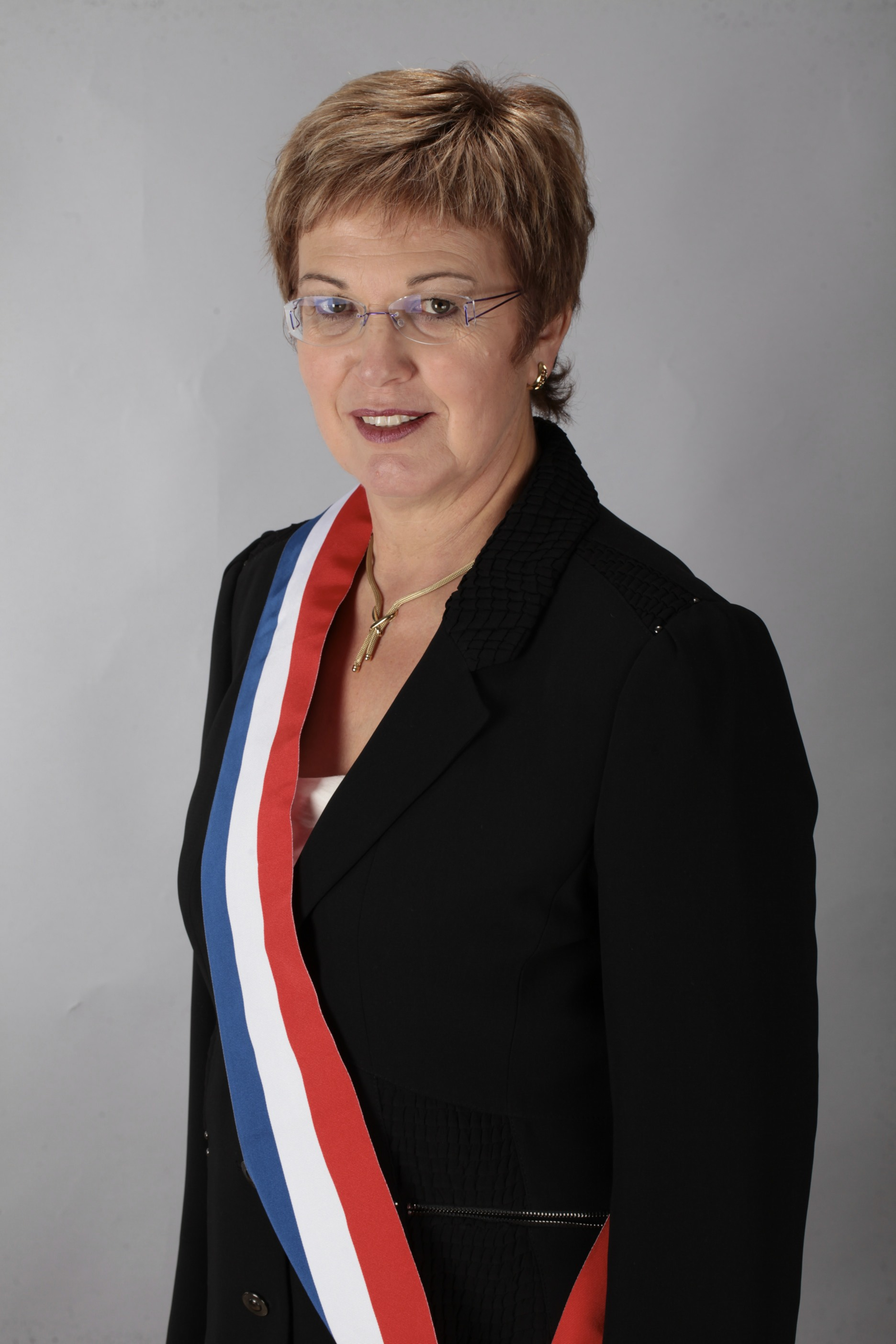
- Langlade in 2010

Personal details
- Born: 20 June 1956 (age 69) Sorges, France
- Party: PS

Colette Langlade (born 20 June 1956) was a member of the National Assembly of France. She represented Dordogne's 3rd constituency from 2008 to 2017, as a member of the Socialiste, radical, citoyen et divers gauche.
