= Serge Muller =

French politician (born 1976)

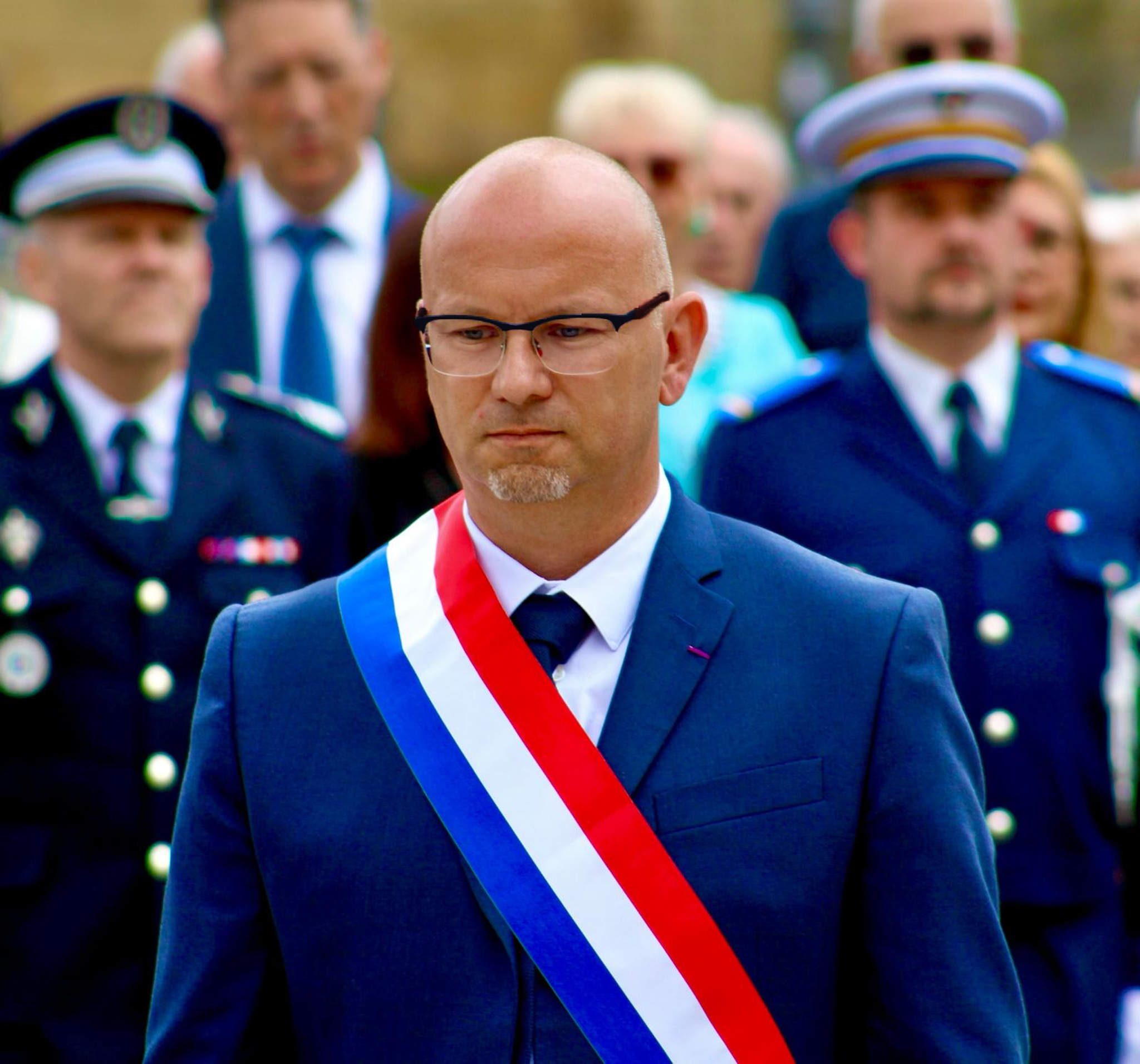

Member of the National Assembly for Dordogne's 2nd constituency
- Incumbent
- Assumed office 2022
- Preceded by: Michel Delpon

Personal details
- Born: 1976 (age 49–50) Toulon, France
- Party: National Rally

Serge Muller (born 1976) is a French politician who was elected as a member of the National Assembly for Dordogne's 2nd constituency in 2022.

Muller was born in Toulon in 1976. Before politics he was a caregiver in a mental hospital and then a psychiatric nurse. He is an RN candidate in the 2021 departmental elections in Saint-Astier before being a candidate in the June 2022 legislative elections and winning the election in the second round defeating Michel Delpon from La République En Marche!.
