= Malika Sorel =

French political

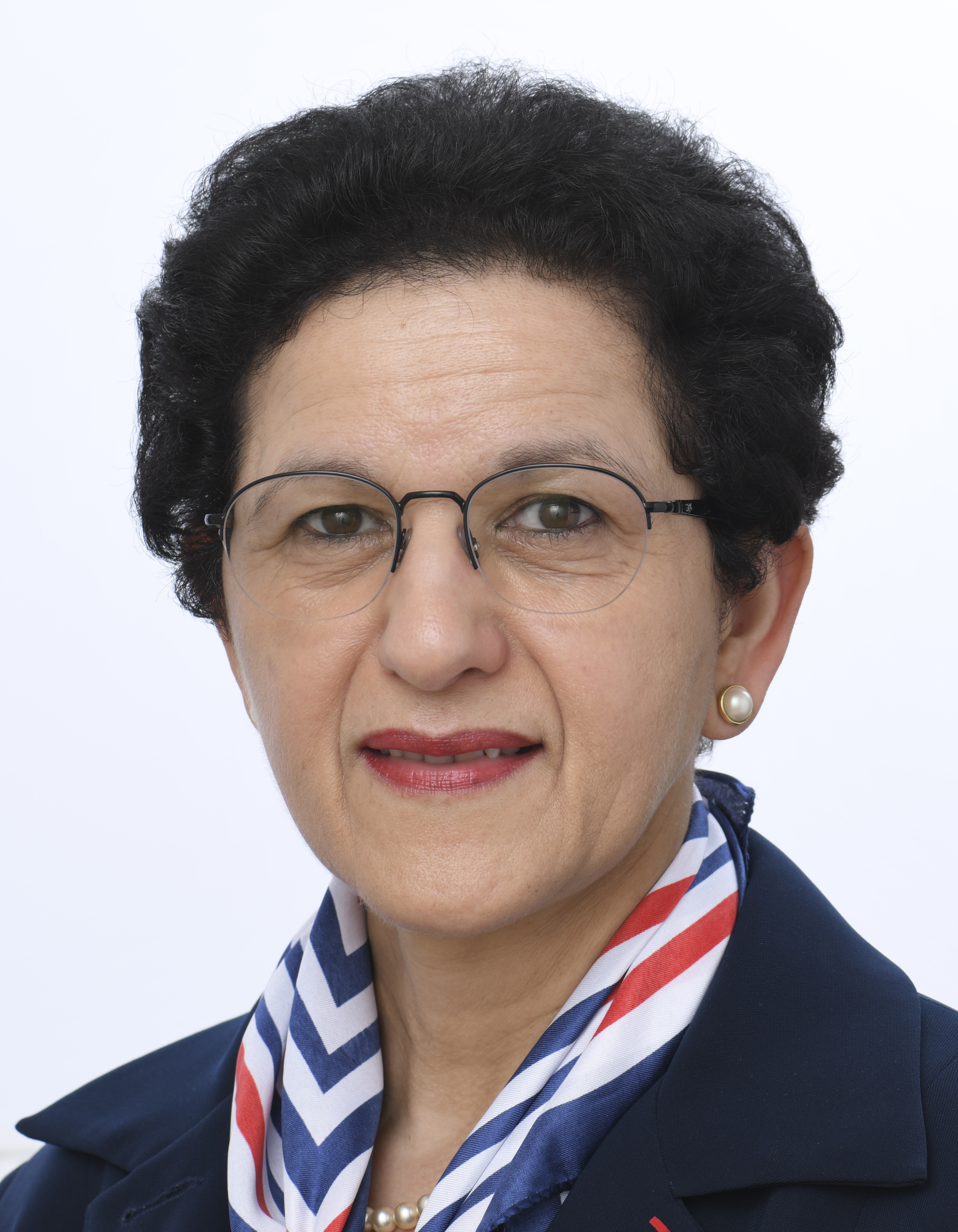
- Official portrait, 2024

Member of the European Parliament for France
- Incumbent
- Assumed office 16 July 2024

Personal details
- Born: Halima Mayouf; August 7, 1962 (age 64) Marseille, France
- Citizenship: Algeria (1962–1992); France (since 1992)
- Party: RN (2024–2025)
- Other political affiliations: UMP (2005–2015); LR (2015–2017); HCI (2009–2012)
- Spouse: Mr. Sorel-Sutter (m. 1992)
- Education: National Polytechnic School; Sciences Po
- Occupation: Essayist • Politician
- Awards: Legion of Honour (2011)

Malika Sorel-Sutter (born Halima Mayouf; 7 August 1962) is a French essayist and politician. Her work focuses on the problems of education and training of younger generations, family policy, immigration issues and French foreign policy. She was elected as a Member of the European Parliament in 2024.

== Biography ==
Born in Marseille, daughter of Algerian immigrants parents, Malika Sorel-Sutter completed her primary and secondary studies in the French educational system. She moved to Algeria when she was 10 years old and returned to France at 25. She is an engineer from École Polytechnique d'Algiers and has an MBA from Sciences Po (1996). After working in executive recruiting for the high-tech sector, she began writing about social issues, such as immigration issues and about French foreign policy.

On 4 September 2009, she was appointed, by Nicolas Sarkozy, as a member of the Superior Council for Integration created by Michel Rocard in 1989, a position she held until the dissolution of this council by François Hollande on 24 December 2012.

N. Beau, associate professor at the Maghreb Institute at Paris University, notes that her positions are published on sites such as, among others, Riposte Laïque, and that his blog is regularly cited by far-right sites, which the identity bloc “gives its panegyric” and qualifies it as a “fundamentalist of secularism”.

On 24 March 2024, Malika Sorel announces that she will join the National Rally list led by Jordan Bardella for the 2024 European elections, as second in the RN list.
