= Lourdios-Ichère =

- Commune
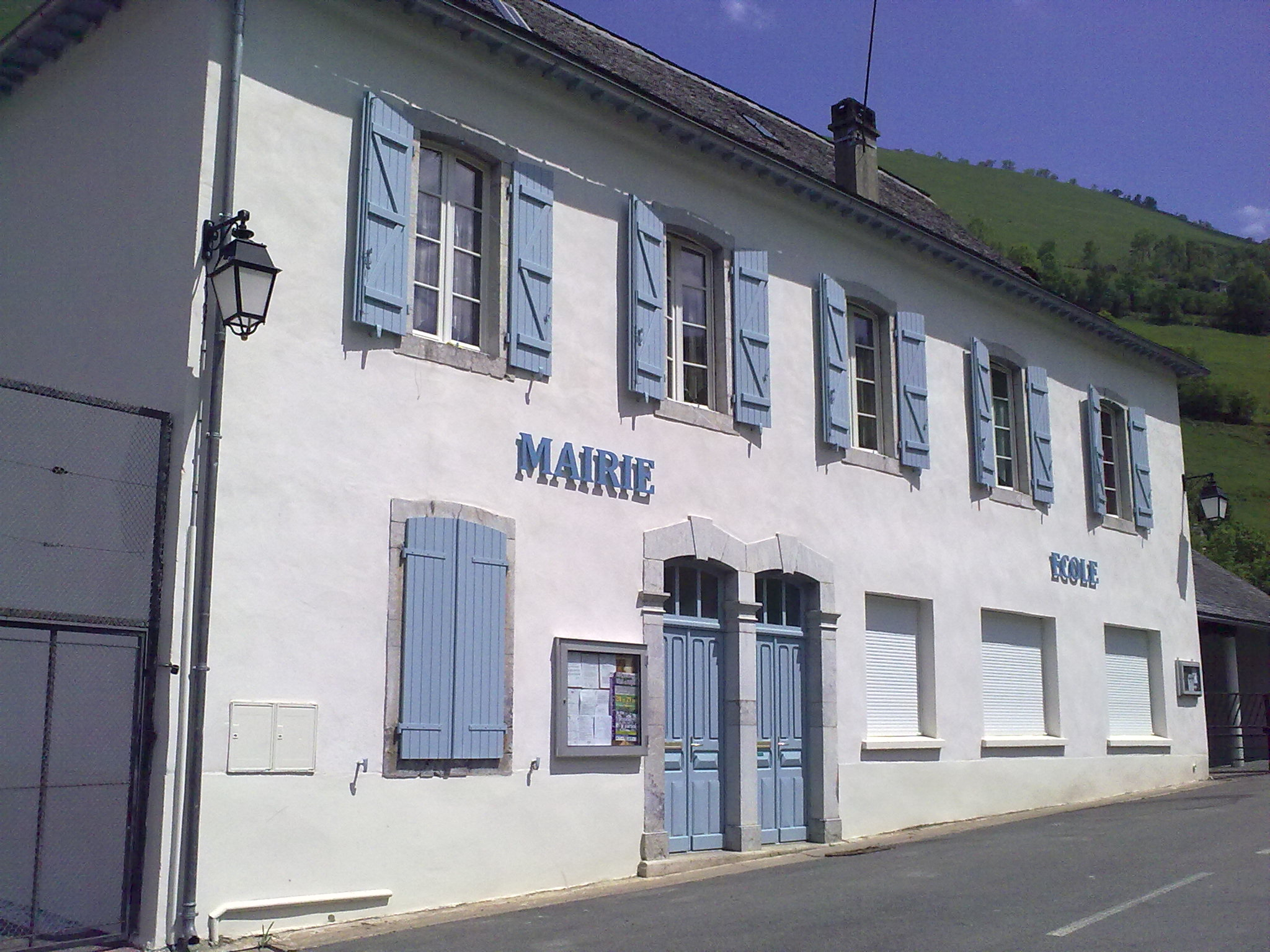
- Town Hall of Lourdios-Ichère
- Location of Lourdios-Ichère
- Location within France Location within Nouvelle-Aquitaine
- Coordinates: 43°03′00″N 0°39′50″W
- Country: France
- Region: Nouvelle-Aquitaine
- Department: Pyrénées-Atlantiques
- Arrondissement: Oloron-Sainte-Marie
- Canton: Oloron-Sainte-Marie-1
- Intercommunality: Haut Béarn

Government
  - Mayor (2020–2026): Marthe Clot
- Area^{1}: 16 km^{2} (6.2 sq mi)
- Elevation: 450 m (1,480 ft)
- Highest elevation: 1,627 m (5,338 ft)
- Lowest elevation: 369 m (1,211 ft)
- Population (2023): 145
  - Density: 9.1/km^{2} (23/sq mi)
- Time zone: UTC+01:00 (CET)
  - Summer (DST): UTC+02:00 (CEST)
- INSEE/Postal code: 64351 /64490
- ^{1} French Land Register data, which excludes lakes, ponds, glaciers > 1 km^{2} (0.386 sq mi or 247 acres) and river estuaries.

Lourdios-Ichère (French pronunciation: [luʁdjɔs iʃɛʁ]; Occitan: Ardiòs e Ishèra) is a commune in the Pyrénées-Atlantiques department, southwestern France. The current mayor is Marthe Clot, elected in 2020.

== History ==
The municipality was created in 1820 when Lourdios (a neighbourhood of Osse-en-Aspe) was united with Ichère (a neighbourhood of Sarrance).

In 2017 during the presidential election the town became known to the French public thanks to the candidate Jean Lassalle who had been the mayor for over 40 years. During the first round he won the majority of the vote with 68.8% in his constituency. At the national level, Lassalle is less popular, receiving 1.5% of votes countrywide.

== See also ==
- Communes of the Pyrénées-Atlantiques department
