= Résistons =

French political party

Résistons!
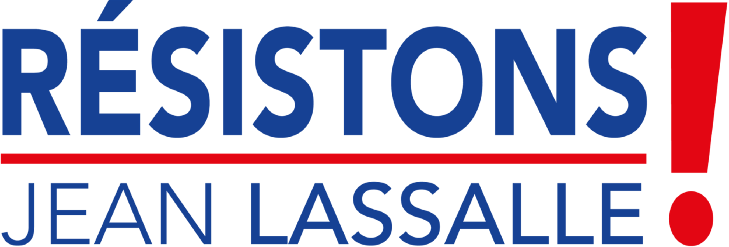
- Abbreviation: R!
- Leader: Jean Lassalle
- Founder: Jean Lassalle
- Founded: 17 March 2016; 9 years ago
- Split from: Democratic Movement
- Headquarters: 50, boulevard Malesherbes; 75008 Paris
- Ideology: Ruralism; Humanism; Protectionism; Sovereignism; Agrarianism; Soft Euroscepticism
- Political position: Centre to centre-right
- National affiliation: Rural Alliance
- Colours: Blue, white and red

Website
- resistons-france.fr

Résistons (R! or RES, Occitan: Resistim or Resistiscam), is a French political party founded in 2016 by Jean Lassalle, then deputy for Pyrénées-Atlantiques and candidate in the presidential election of 2017 and then that of 2022. The party contested the 2024 European Parliament election as part of the Rural Alliance list.

== Election results ==
=== Presidential ===
Election year	Candidate	First round		Second round		Result
Election year	Candidate	Votes	%	Votes	%	Result
2017	Jean Lassalle	435,301	1.21 (#7)	—		Lost
2022	Jean Lassalle	1,101,387	3.13 (#7)	—		Lost

=== European Parliament ===
Election	Leader	Votes	%	Seats	+/−	EP Group
2024 (Note: Ran in a joint list with FNC, that won no seats.)	Jean Lassalle	582,196	2.36 (#9)	0 / 81	New	−
