= Michel Delpon =

French politician

Michel Delpon is a French politician representing La République En Marche! He was elected to the French National Assembly on 18 June 2017, representing the department of Dordogne.

== See also ==
- 2017 French legislative election
