= Ferracci =

Ferracci is a surname. Notable people with the surname include:

- Marc Ferracci, French politician and economist, deputy in the Assemblée nationale, former cabinet minister, of Corsican family origin
- Michel Ferracci-Porri, Corsican French writer,
- Pierre Ferracci, Corsican French businessman, expert in social policy
- Sophie Gagnant-Ferracci, French lawyer

== See also ==
- Alexandra Feracci, French karateka
