= Football in France =

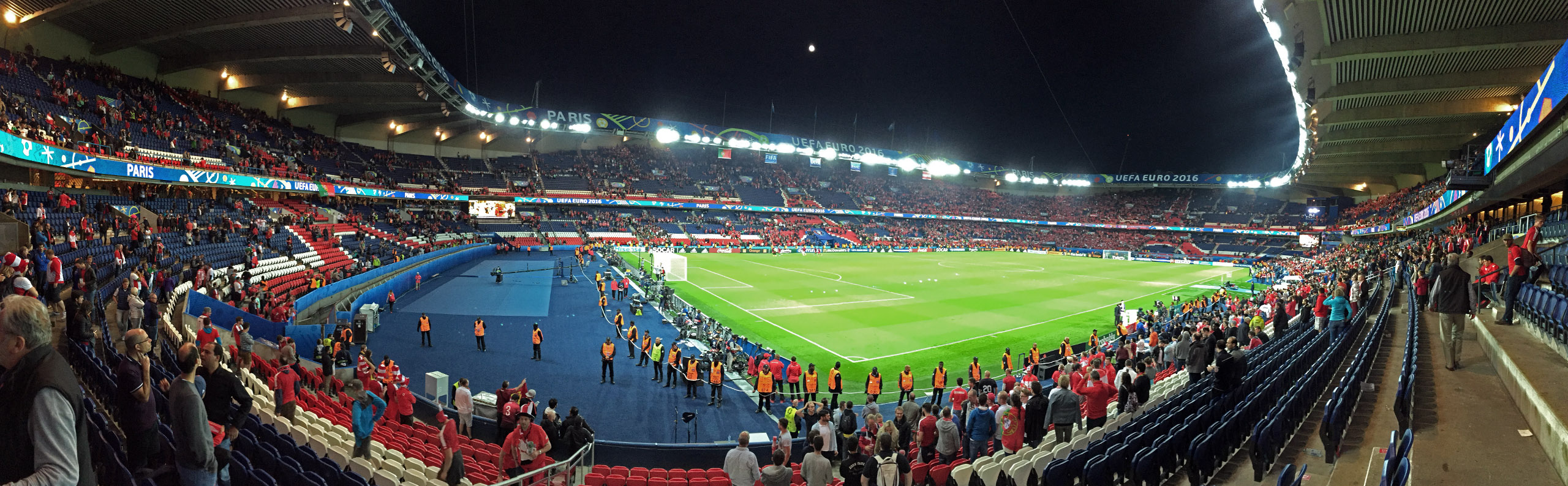
- The Parc des Princes is the home of Paris Saint-Germain
- Country: France
- Governing body: FFF
- National team: France (men) • France (women)
- Registered players: 2.1 million
- Clubs: 18,194

National competitions
- FIFA World Cup; FIFA Women's World Cup; UEFA European Championship; UEFA Women's Championship; UEFA Nations League; UEFA Women's Nations League

Club competitions
- List: League: Ligue 1 Première Ligue Ligue 2 Ligue 3 Championnat National 1 Championnat National 2 Régional 1 Régional 2; Cups: Coupe de France Coupe de France féminine Trophée des Champions Trophée des Championnes

International competitions
- FIFA Club World Cup; FIFA Intercontinental Cup; UEFA Champions League; UEFA Women's Champions League; UEFA Europa League; UEFA Women's Europa Cup; UEFA Conference League; UEFA Super Cup

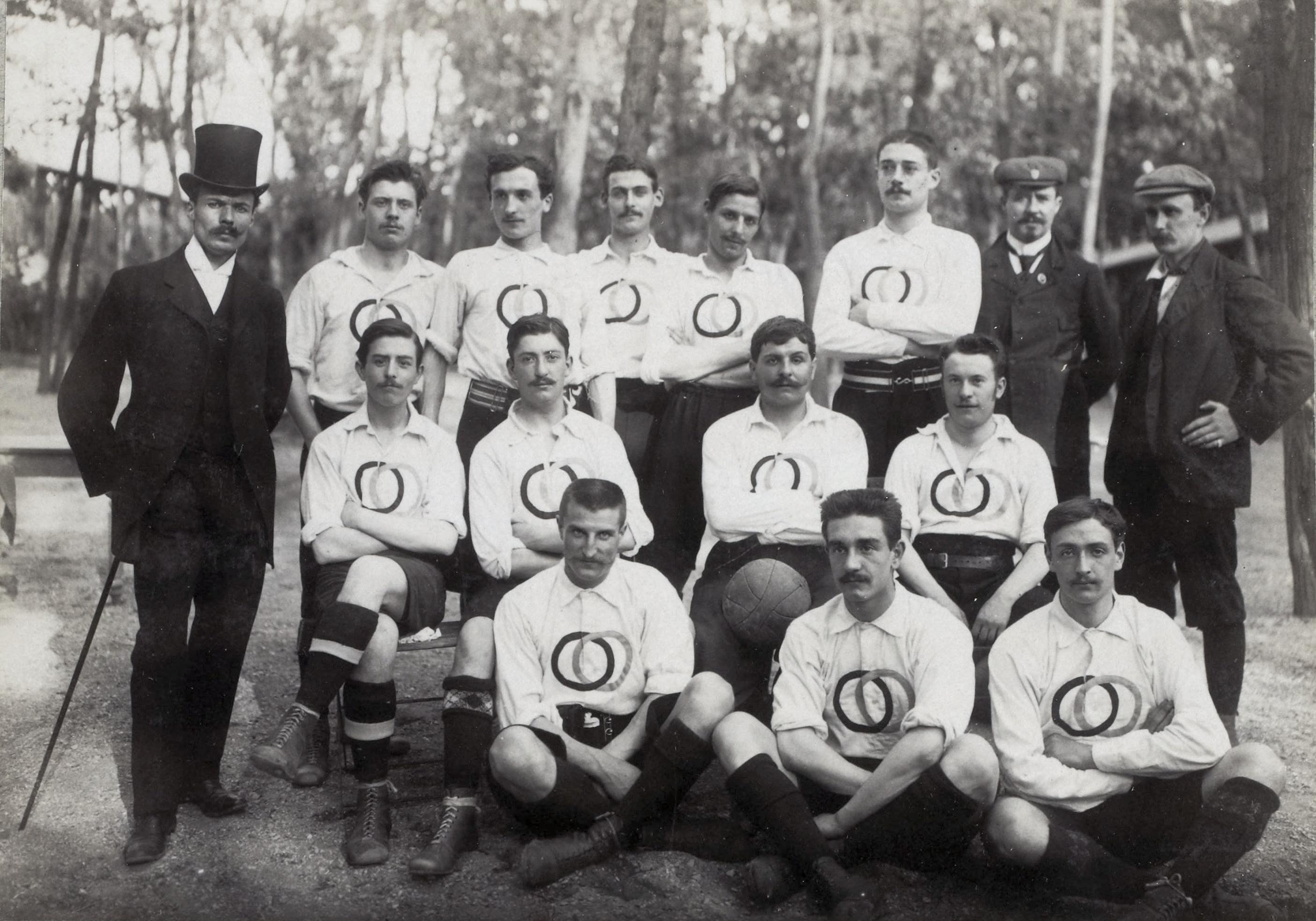
France at the 1900 Summer Olympics.

Association football is the most popular sport in France. In 2024, 53% of people in France declared an interest in football, with 26% being very interested. The French Football Federation (FFF, Fédération Française de Football) is the national governing body and is responsible for overseeing all aspects of association football in the country, both professional and amateur. The federation organizes the Coupe de France and is responsible for appointing the management of the men's, women's, and youth national football teams in France. The federation gives responsibility of Ligue 1 and Ligue 2 to the Ligue de Football Professionnel (LFP) who oversee, organize, and manage the country's top two leagues. The French Football Federation also supervises the overseas departments and territories leagues and hosts football club AS Monaco, a club based in the independent sovereign state of Monaco. In 2022, the FFF had 2.1 million licensees, 1.8 million players and 14,000 registered clubs, the second highest number of registered players in Europe after Germany.

The first football club was introduced to France in 1863 as described in a newspaper article by The Scotsman, which stated "A number of English gentlemen living in Paris have lately organised a football club... The football contests take place in the Bois de Boulogne, by permission of the authorities and surprise the French amazingly."

Today, football in France is especially being played successfully by people of non-European origin, in particular people of Subsaharan origin and people from North Africa who are overrepresented in the Banlieue. The importance of players of non-European origin is also reflected in the composition of the French World Cup winning team where only six of the 23 players were of European descent.

France is a football superpower; by its footballers playing around the world, according to the CIES Football Observatory, in 2023, France is the second country in the world behind Brazil, with the most footballers playing abroad with 1,033. According to Statista, of the estimated 130,000 professional football players worldwide, 6,368 originated from France, the third highest number in the world after Brazil (10,694) and Mexico (9,223).

== League system ==
=== Ligue de Football Professionnel ===
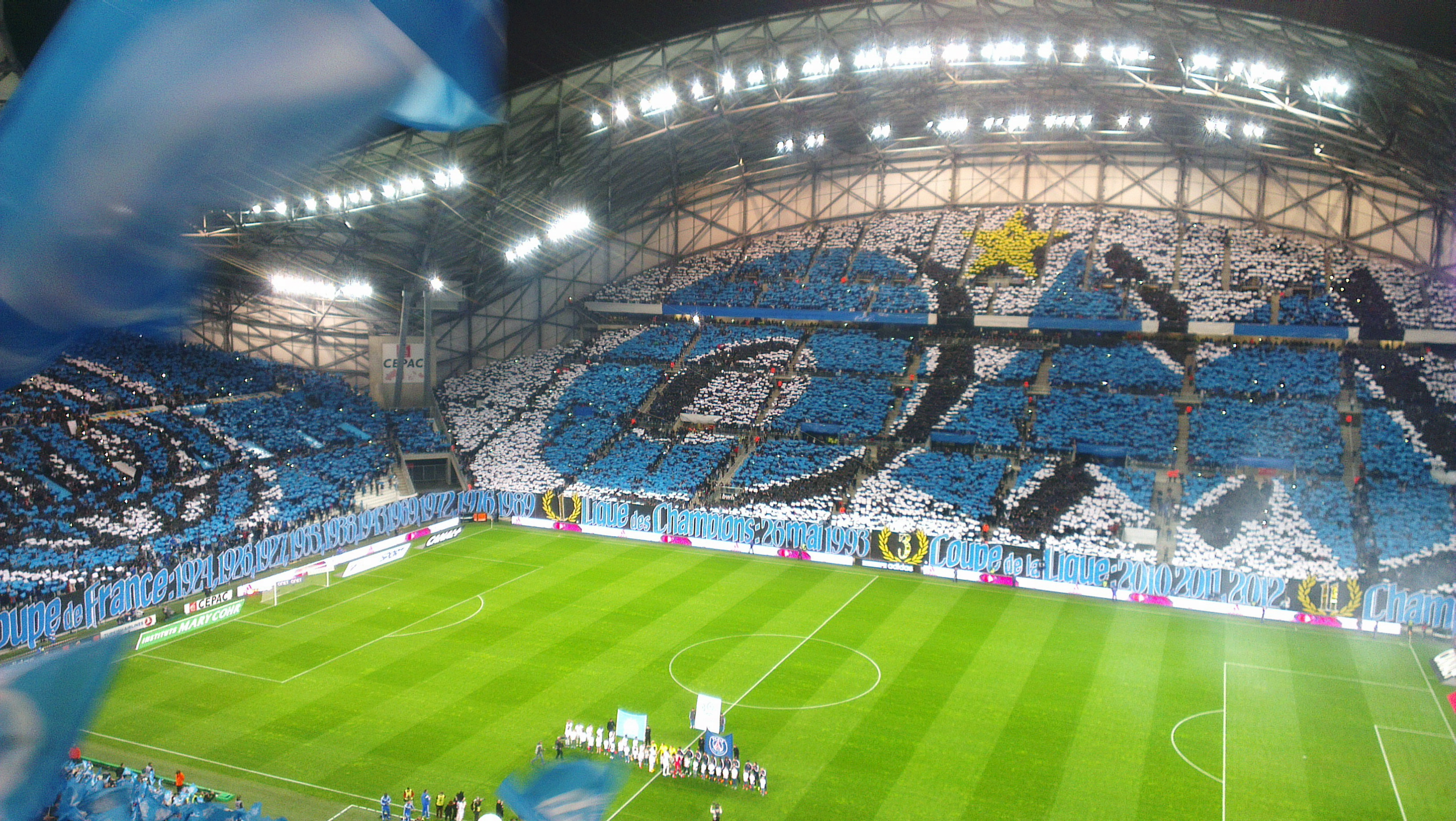
The Stade Vélodrome, home of Olympique de Marseille, before a match against Paris Saint-Germain in 2015.

The top two divisions of French football, Ligue 1 and Ligue 2, are governed by the Ligue de Football Professionnel. The league organizes and manages both leagues and is also responsible for the 36 professional football clubs that contest football in France (18 in Ligue 1 and 18 in Ligue 2).

Ligue 1 is the French professional league for football clubs. It is the country's primary football competition and serves as the top division of the French football league system. Contested by 18 clubs, it operates on a system of promotion and relegation with Ligue 2. Ligue 1 is one of the top national leagues, currently ranked fifth in Europe behind the English Premier League, Italian Serie A, Spanish La Liga and German Bundesliga. Ligue 1 was inaugurated on 11 September 1932 under the name National before switching to Division 1 after a year of existence. The name lasted until 2002 before switching to its current name. The current champions of France are Paris Saint-Germain, who won a record fourteenth title in 2026.

Ligue 2 is the second division of French football. Contested by 20 clubs, it operates on a system of promotion and relegation with the Championnat National. The league was created in 1934, a year after Ligue 1 and consisted of 23 clubs that were divided into two groups, Nord and Sud.

Ligue 1 club Paris Saint-Germain ranked fourth place in the top ten most popular sports clubs on social media in the world as of 7 February 2024:

Rank	Football club	Country	Followers
1	Real Madrid	Spain	360.5 million
2	Barcelona	Spain	318.8 million
3	Manchester United	England	207 million
4	Paris Saint-Germain	France	163 million
5	Juventus	Italy	147.4 million
6	Manchester City	England	139.7 million
7	Chelsea	England	136.7 million
8	Liverpool	England	131.6 million
9	Bayern Munich	Germany	126.5 million
10	Arsenal	England	99.2 million

=== Championnat National ===
The Championnat National is the third division of French football. Though the league has several clubs that are members of the Ligue de Football Professionnel, it is not governed by the organization primarily because of the LFP's refusal to divide its profits into smaller shares, so they can collaborate with the many amateur clubs in the league to help them become professional. The French Football Federation moderates the league, which was founded in 1993 under the name National 1. Contested by 20 clubs, it operates on a system of promotion and relegation with the Championnat de France amateur.

=== Championnat National 2 ===
The Championnat National 2 is the fourth division of French football and normally features 72 football clubs. Most clubs that participate in the league are amateur clubs, but a small number of clubs are semi-professional. The CFA consists of 72 clubs spread into 4 parallel groups of 18. It is open to the best reserve teams in France and amateur clubs in France, although only the amateur clubs are eligible for promotion to the Championnat National. The highest-placed amateur team in each pool are promoted, replaced by the 4 lowest-placed in the Championnat National.

=== Championnat National 3 ===
The Championnat National 3 is the 5th division in French football and normally consists of 168 teams in 12 groups of 14 organised to align with the regional leagues. The twelve teams (both amateur and reserves of professional teams in higher divisions) that top their league are promoted to Championnat National 2. Relegation from Championnat National 3 is defined by both position in the group and the region the club belongs to. Normally, one club is relegated to each regional league that feeds that group.

=== Lower divisions ===
Some of regional leagues are organised and managed by the Ligue du Football Amateur. The LFA, under the watch of the French Football Federation, is responsible for administering and federating the actions of the regional and district leagues.

=== Première Ligue ===
The Première Ligue is the top league for women's football clubs in France. The Première Ligue is ranked the best league in Europe according to UEFA. The league was originally created in 1918 by Alice Milliat and ran for 12 successful seasons until women's football was banned in France. The league was refounded in 1974 and officially reinstated in 1975.

It is contested by 12 clubs. The league operates on a system of promotion and relegation with lower leagues and is governed by the French Football Federation. The league is known as D1 Arkema. Lyon has won the most league titles, with 18.

=== Lower divisions ===
Division 2 Féminine is the second-tier of French women's football, contested by 12 clubs. Relegation is to Division 3 Féminine, contested by 24 fully professional clubs split into two groups. The fourth level is Régional 1 Féminine.

=== Overseas leagues ===
The leagues based in the overseas departments and territories of France are run by their respective associations under the watch of the French Football Federation. Under the rules of the FFF, clubs in the leagues are allowed to participate in confederation competitions based on their regional locations. For example, the champion of the Réunion Premier League is allowed inclusion into the CAF Champions League.

== Cup competitions ==
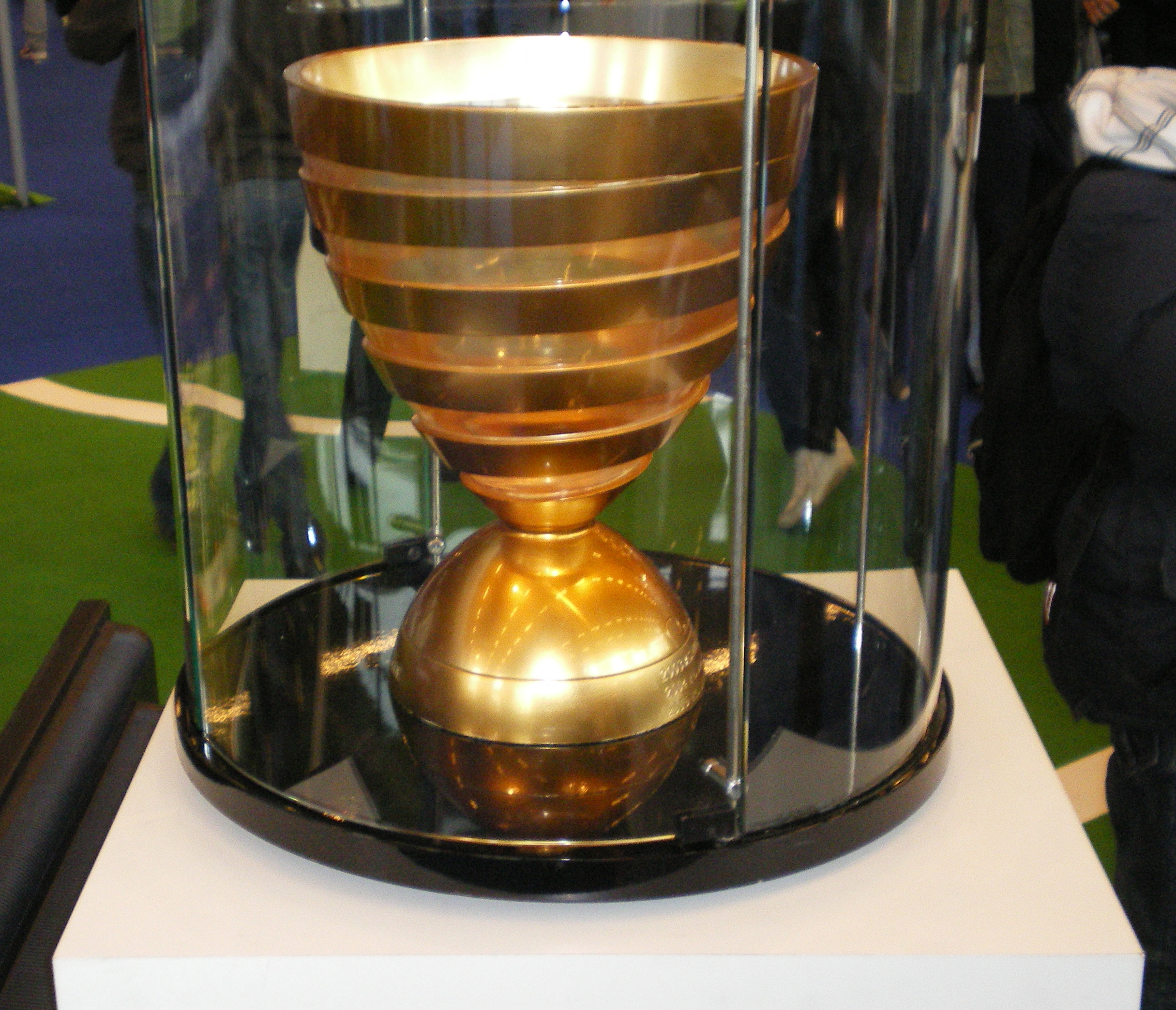
Coupe de la Ligue trophy.

The most important cup competition in France is the Coupe de France. However, several other national cups are targeted at clubs at different levels.

- The Coupe de France is the premier knockout cup competition in French football. It is open to all amateur and professional football clubs in France, including clubs based in the overseas departments and territories. The final is played at the Stade de France and, during the 2016–17 season, celebrated its 100th anniversary.
- The Coupe de la Ligue was the second major cup competition in France. It was known outside France as the French League Cup and was a knockout league cup competition organised by the Ligue de Football Professionnel. Unlike the Coupe de France, it was only open to professional clubs who were members of the LFP. The competition was discontinued in 2020 to prevent fixture congestion.
- The Trophée des Champions is played each July or January as a one-off match between the Coupe de France winners and the Ligue 1 champions.
- Regional amateur leagues of France organise their own cup competitions that are run by the French Football Federation. For example, the Coupe Bourgogne only features amateur clubs that are based in the region of Burgundy.
- Men's youth cups include the Coupe Gambardella, Coupe Nationale, and the Coupe Fédérale. The Coupe Gambardella cup competition held between the under-19s of the French football clubs. The Coupe Nationale holds dual competitions for the under-13 and under-15 teams of football clubs, while the Coupe Fédérale holds a national cup competition for under-16 teams.
- The Coupe de l'Outre-Mer is a football cup competition that was created in 2008. It was designed to have the national football teams of the overseas territories compete against each other

=== Women's ===
- The Coupe de France féminine, a premier cup competition reserved exclusively for French football clubs. The competition is open to all professional and non-professional teams in the country.
- Trophée des Championnes, an annual match between the league champions of Division 1 and the winners of the Coupe de France. The league runners-up play if the same team won the league and the cup.
- Coupe Nationale
- Coupe Fédérale
- The Coupe National holds a youth cup competition for the under-14 teams, while the Coupe Fédérale holds cup competitions for the under-13 and under-16 teams.

== Competition records ==
=== UEFA Champions League ===
The following teams have qualified for the last eight of the European Cup / UEFA Champions League.

- Marseille (1989–90 – Semi-finals, 1990–91 – Runners-up, 1992–93 – Champions, 2011–12 – Quarter-finals)
- Monaco (1993–94 – Semi-finals, 1997–98 – Semi-finals, 2003–04 – Runners-up, 2016–17 – Semi-finals)
- Saint-Étienne (1974–75 – Semi-finals, 1975–76 – Runners-up, 1976–77 – Quarter-finals)
- Lyon (2003–04 – Quarter-finals, 2004–05 – Quarter-finals, 2005–06 – Quarter-finals, 2009–10 – Semi-finals, 2019–20 – Semi-finals)
- Reims (1955–56 – Runners-up, 1958–59 – Runners-up, 1962–63 – Quarter-finals)
- Bordeaux (1984–85 – Semi-finals, 2009–10 – Quarter-finals)
- Paris Saint-Germain (1994–95 – Semi-finals, 2012–13 – Quarter-finals, 2013–14 – Quarter-finals, 2014–15 – Quarter-finals, 2015–16 – Quarter-finals, 2019–20 – Runners-up, 2020–21 – Semi-finals, 2023–24 – Semi-finals, 2024–25 – Champions, 2025–26 – Champions)
- Nantes (1995–96 – Semi-finals)
- Auxerre (1996–97 – Quarter-finals)

=== UEFA Women's Champions League ===
- Lyon (Winners: 2010–11, 2011–12, 2016–17, 2017–18, 2018–19, 2019–20, 2021–22; Runners-up: 2009–10, 2012–13, 2023–24, 2025–26; Semi-finals: 2024–25; Quarter-finals: 2020–21, 2022–23)
- Paris Saint-Germain (Runners-up: 2014–15, 2016–17; Semi-finals: 2023–24)
- Paris FC (Semi-finals: 2012–13; Quarter-finals: 2010–11)
- Montpellier (Quarter-finals: 2009–10, 2017–18)

== National teams ==
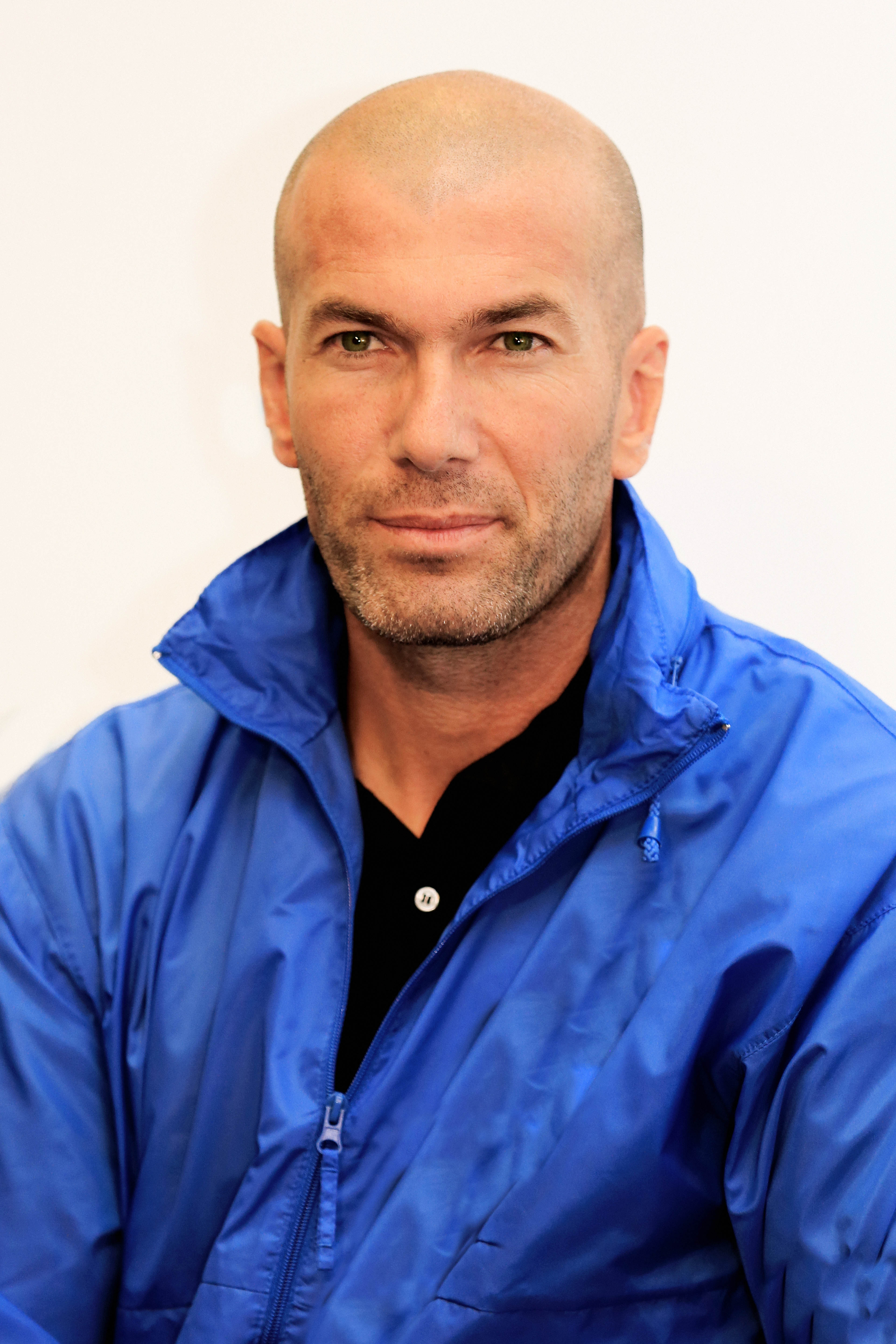
Zinedine Zidane, member of the national team from 1994 to 2006.

The France national football team represents France in international football. France was one of the four European teams that participated at the inaugural World Cup in 1930 and are one of eight national teams to have won the competition, which they did in 1998 when they hosted the Cup, defeating Brazil 3–0 in the final. They won their second world title 20 years later, after defeating Croatia 4–2 in the final of the 2018 edition in Russia. France also won two European Championships in 1984 and 2000, and hosted the tournament on three occasions, including their victorious 1984 campaign. Following France's 2001 Confederations Cup victory, they became the first national team to win the three most important men's titles organised by FIFA: the FIFA World Cup, the FIFA Confederations Cup, and the Olympic Tournament. This would be followed with Argentina and Brazil's victories at the Summer Olympics in 2004 and 2016. France additionally went on to win a UEFA Nations League title in 2021.

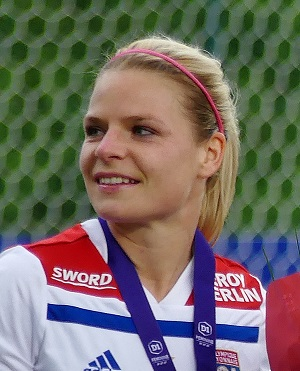
Eugénie Le Sommer, member of the national team since 2009.

The France women's national football team represents the country in international women's football. France initially struggled on the international stage failing to qualify for three of the first FIFA Women's World Cups and the six straight UEFA European Championships before reaching the quarter-finals in the 1997 edition of the competition. However, since the beginning of the new millennium, France have become a mid-tier national team and one of the most consistent in Europe, having qualified for their first-ever FIFA Women's World Cup in 2003 and reaching the quarter-finals in the last three consecutive European Championships. They also hosted the 2019 Women's World Cup, reaching the quarter-finals.

The France national youth football teams consists of age-specific national teams beginning with the France national under-16 football team and ending with the France national under-21 football team. Since the coaching tenure of Aimé Jacquet, there is an unwritten rule among senior national team coaches that players called up to the national team must have had prior international experience with the under-21 team.

=== Overseas departments national teams ===
The following overseas department national teams act as feeder teams for the France national football team. All teams are run by their respective federation under the authority of the French Football Federation.

National team	Elo Ranking	Manager	Stadium	Member Association(s)
French Guiana	159	(France) Ghislain Zulémaro	Stade de Baduel	CONCACAF and CFU
Guadeloupe	91	(France) Roger Salnot	Stade René Serge Nabajoth	CONCACAF and CFU
Martinique	115	(France) Theodore Antonin	Stade d'Honneur de Dillon	CONCACAF and CFU
Réunion	138	TBD	Stade Jean-Ivoula	CAF
Saint Martin	193	(France) Andy Gerard	TBD	CONCACAF and CFU

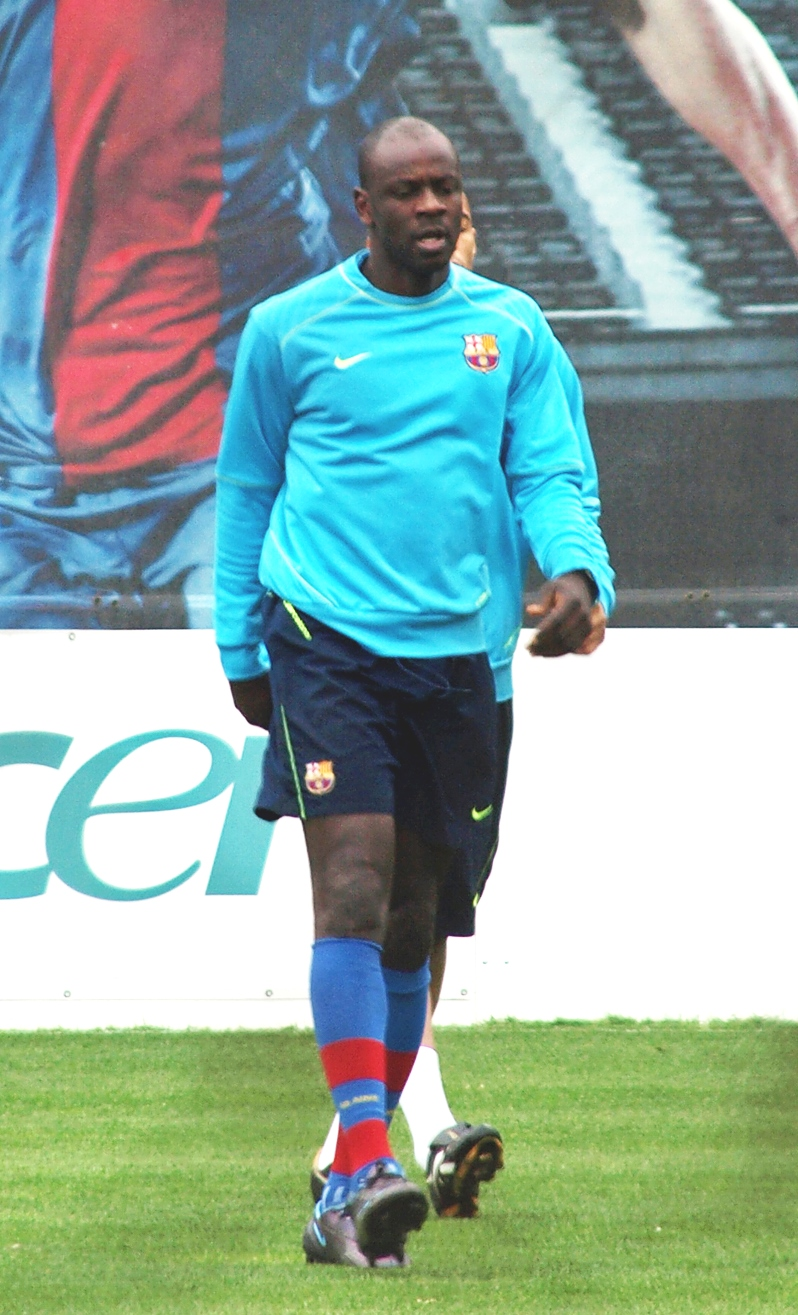
Lilian Thuram, from Guadeloupe, is the nation's second-most capped male football player.

As an overseas department of the French Republic, each national team is not a member of FIFA, therefore they are not eligible to enter the World Cup. However, since inhabitants of the overseas departments are French citizens, players are eligible to play for the France national football team. Guadeloupe, Martinique, Saint Martin, and French Guiana are associate members of CONCACAF and are full members of the Caribbean Football Union, and are thus eligible for all competitions organized by both, while Réunion are associate members of CAF. Indeed, according to the status of the FFF (article 34, paragraph 6): "[...]Under the control of related continental confederations, and with the agreement of the FFF, those leagues can organize international sport events at a regional level or set up teams in order to participate to them."

A special rule of the CONCACAF Gold Cup only allows players to join the team if they have not played for France during the previous five years. On the other hand, any player joining the team is allowed to join the France national team afterward with no time restrictions.

The use of overseas department players has been extremely beneficial for the France national team. Lilian Thuram and Bernard Lama, who were born in Guadeloupe and Martinique, respectively, were a part of the winning team at the 1998 FIFA World Cup. Also on the team were Thierry Henry and Bernard Diomède, who, though born in metropolitan France, were descendants of parents from overseas departments. Currently, Florent Malouda (French Guiana), William Gallas, Mikaël Silvestre, Michaël Ciani (Guadeloupe), Nicolas Anelka (Martinique), and Guillaume Hoarau and Florent Sinama Pongolle (Réunion) are members of the national team who either hail from or whose families hail from the overseas departments.

== French football stadiums ==
Stadiums with a capacity of 40,000 or higher are included.

#	Image	Stadium	Capacity	City	Region	Home team	Opened	Notes
1		Stade de France	81,338	Saint-Denis	Île-de-France	France national football team	1998	UEFA Category 4 stadium
2		Stade Vélodrome	67,394	Marseille	Provence-Alpes-Côte d'Azur	Olympique de Marseille	1937	UEFA Category 4 stadium
3		Parc Olympique Lyonnais	59,186	Décines-Charpieu	Auvergne-Rhône-Alpes	Olympique Lyonnais	2016	UEFA Category 4 stadium
4		Stade Pierre-Mauroy	50,157	Villeneuve-d'Ascq	Hauts-de-France	Lille OSC	2012	UEFA Category 4 stadium
5		Parc des Princes	48,583	Paris	Île-de-France	Paris Saint-Germain FC	1972	UEFA Category 4 stadium
6		Matmut Atlantique	42,115	Bordeaux	Nouvelle-Aquitaine	FC Girondins de Bordeaux	2015	UEFA Category 4 stadium
7		Stade Geoffroy-Guichard	41,965	Saint-Étienne	Auvergne-Rhône-Alpes	AS Saint-Étienne	1931	

== List of club owners ==
=== Ligue 1 ===
Club	Owner(s)	Estimated combined net worth	Source of wealth
Angers	(Algeria) Chabane Family		Meat
Auxerre	(China) James Zhou	1.1B$	Product Packaging
Brest	(France) Denis Le Saint		Fruits and Vegetables
Le Havre	(United States) Vincent Volpe		Business
Le Mans	(Brazil) OutField Inc (Brazil) Pedro Oliveira		Business Consortium
Lens	(France) Joseph Oughourlian (United States) Amber Capital		Investments
Lille	(Luxembourg) Merlyn Partners		Investments
Lorient	(France) Loïc Féry (United States) Bill Foley	300M€	Investments
Lyon	(United States) Eagle Football Holdings LLC (United States) John Textor		Sport Investments
Marseille	(United States) Frank McCourt	1.2M$	Sport investments
Monaco	(Russia) Dmitry Rybolovlev (Monaco) House of Grimaldi		Specialized chemicals, investments, royal family
Nice	(England) INEOS		Chemical industries
Paris FC	(France) Agache Sports (France) Alter Paris (Austria) Red Bull GmbH (Sri Lanka) (England) BRI Sports		Luxury Goods, Beverages, Telecommunications
Paris Saint-Germain	Qatar Sports Investments (United States) Arctos Partners	4.4B$	Gas & Oil, Private Equity
Rennes	(France) Francois Pinault	23M€	Luxury
Strasbourg	(United States) BlueCo		Sport Investments
Toulouse	(United States) RedBird Capital Partners		Sport Investments
Troyes	(England) City Football Group		Sport Investments

=== Ligue 2 ===
Club	Owner(s)	Estimated combined net worth	Source of wealth
Ajaccio	(France) Alain Orsoni		
Amiens	(France) Bernard Joannin		Retail
Angers	(France) Saïd Chabane		
Annecy	(France) Sebastien Faraglia		
Auxerre	(China) James Zhou		
Bastia	(France) Familles Luiggi et Ferrandi		
Bordeaux	(Luxembourg) (Spain) Gérard Lopez		Investments
Caen	(United States) Oaktree Capital		Investments
Concarneau			
Dunkerque	(Turkey) Amissos / Yildirim		
Grenoble	(France) Stéphane Rosnoblet		Supermarket
Guingamp	(France) Noël Le Graët		
Laval	(France) Laurent Lairy		
Paris FC	(France) Pierre Ferracci; Bahrain Mumtalakat Holding Company (Sri Lanka) Allirajah Subaskaran (Armenia) Noah Football Group		
Pau	(France) Bernard Laporte-Fray		
Quevilly	(France) Michel Mallet		
Rodez	(France) Pierre Olivier Murat		
Saint-Étienne	(Canada) Kilmer Sports Venture		
Troyes	(United Arab Emirates) City Football Group		Sport investments
Valenciennes	(England) Sport Republic		United Group

=== National ===
Club	Owner(s)	Estimated combined net worth	Source of wealth
Chateauroux	(United Arab Emirates) United World Group (United Arab Emirates) Abdullah bin Mossad		Sport Investments
Dijon	(France) Olivier Delcourt		
Le Mans	(France) Thierry Gomez		
Nancy	(United States) Chien Lee		Sport Investments
Nîmes	(France) Rani Assaf		Telecommunications
Niort	(France) Ethan Hanouna		
Red Star	(United States) 777 Partners		
Sedan	(France)		
Rouen	(France)		
Sochaux	(France) Romain Peugeot		
Versailles	(France) Alexandre Mulliez		

== Support ==
=== Public image of clubs ===
Most and least liked Ligue 1 clubs (L'Actu Sport, 2022)
Club	%		Net %
Club	Like	Dislike	Net %
Angers	15.3%	13.0%	+2.3%
Bordeaux	13.3%	31.7%	–18.4%
Brest	16.3%	11.3%	+5.0%
Clermont	19.2%	6.4%	+12.8%
Lens	57.1%	10.8%	+46.3%
Lille	17.6%	21.0%	–1.4%
Lorient	15.7%	9.8%	+5.9%
Lyon	16.3%	48.5%	–32.2%
Marseille	10.5%	45.4%	–34.9%
Metz	5.1%	21.0%	–15.9%
Monaco	33.4%	8.3%	+25.1%
Montpellier	15.5%	18.5%	–3.0%
Nantes	32.6%	20.4%	+12.2%
Nice	21.1%	37.5%	–16.4%
Paris Saint-Germain	10.7%	54.3%	–43.6%
Reims	11.7%	10.6%	+1.1%
Rennes	26.6%	12.9%	+13.7%
Saint-Étienne	29.6%	29.2%	+0.2%
Strasbourg	45.6%	7.6%	+38.0%
Troyes	5.0%	11.2%	–6.2%

== Attendances ==
The average attendance per top-flight football league season and the club with the highest average attendance:

Season	League average	Best club	Best club average
2024–25	27,937	Olympique de Marseille	63,553
2023–24	26,879	Olympique de Marseille	60,799
2022–23	23,803	Olympique de Marseille	62,739
2021–22	—	—	—
2020–21	—	—	—
2019–20	22,526	Olympique de Marseille	52,804
2018–19	22,836	Olympique de Marseille	50,361
2017–18	22,548	Paris Saint-Germain	46,929
2016–17	20,963	Paris Saint-Germain	45,160
2015–16	20,896	Paris Saint-Germain	46,160
2014–15	22,250	Olympique de Marseille	53,130
2013–14	20,953	Paris Saint-Germain	45,420
2012–13	19,211	Paris Saint-Germain	43,239
2011–12	18,870	Paris Saint-Germain	42,892
2010–11	19,742	Olympique de Marseille	51,081
2009–10	20,089	Olympique de Marseille	50,045
2008–09	21,050	Olympique de Marseille	52,276
2007–08	21,841	Olympique de Marseille	52,601
2006–07	21,940	Olympique de Marseille	51,604
2005–06	21,552	Olympique de Marseille	49,625
2004–05	21,294	Olympique de Marseille	52,996
2003–04	20,178	Olympique de Marseille	51,795
2002–03	19,846	Olympique de Marseille	50,813
2001–02	21,755	Olympique de Marseille	50,072
2000–01	23,160	Olympique de Marseille	50,785
1999–2000	22,314	Olympique de Marseille	51,918
1998–99	19,941	Olympique de Marseille	51,409
1997–98	16,572	Paris Saint-Germain	36,723
1996–97	14,163	Paris Saint-Germain	35,582
1995–96	13,230	Paris Saint-Germain	37,353
1994–95	13,156	Paris Saint-Germain	34,700
1993–94	12,556	Paris Saint-Germain	28,370
1992–93	13,276	Olympique de Marseille	27,010
1991–92	11,493	Olympique de Marseille	28,995
1990–91	10,610	Olympique de Marseille	31,025
1989–90	11,798	Olympique de Marseille	31,727
1988–89	10,285	Olympique de Marseille	26,530
1987–88	11,467	Olympique de Marseille	25,233
1986–87	11,425	Olympique de Marseille	31,544
1985–86	10,156	Paris Saint-Germain	24,572
1984–85	9,906	Girondins de Bordeaux	19,621
1983–84	10,084	Paris Saint-Germain	23,840
1982–83	10,886	Paris Saint-Germain	23,928
1981–82	10,146	Paris Saint-Germain	24,082
1980–81	9,821	Paris Saint-Germain	23,329
1979–80	10,625	Paris Saint-Germain	21,361
1978–79	11,145	RC Strasbourg	21,086
1977–78	11,206	Paris Saint-Germain	21,754
1976–77	11,405	Paris Saint-Germain	22,410
1975–76	10,627	AS Saint-Étienne	19,469
1974–75	10,936	Olympique de Marseille	24,033
1973–74	10,325	RC Lens	17,731
1972–73	9,364	Olympique de Marseille	20,681
1971–72	9,084	Olympique de Marseille	22,864
1970–71	8,742	Olympique de Marseille	26,559
1969–70	7,636	Olympique de Marseille	17,451
1968–69	7,161	Olympique de Marseille	12,917
1967–68	7,798	AS Saint-Étienne	14,537
1966–67	8,558	FC Nantes	16,747
1965–66	7,877	FC Nantes	16,707
1964–65	8,668	FC Nantes	12,793
1963–64	9,569	Racing	16,508
1962–63	8,835	Racing	14,867
1961–62	8,789	Racing	18,618
1960–61	8,218	Racing	20,734
1959–60	8,638	Racing	16,804
1958–59	8,727	Racing	20,455
1957–58	9,642	Racing	19,803
1956–57	10,014	Racing	19,186
1955–56	10,514	Racing	19,687
1954–55	10,777	Olympique de Marseille	20,455
1953–54	9,928	Olympique de Marseille	16,792
1952–53	11,209	Racing	20,695
1951–52	11,041	Racing	21,131
1950–51	11,408	Racing	21,621
1949–50	9,220	Racing	15,857
1948–49	9,346	Racing	19,108
1947–48	9,738	Olympique de Marseille	18,799

== See also ==
- Football in Paris
- Sport in France
- List of football stadiums in France
