= Chabane =

Chabane is a surname. Notable people with the surname include:

- Hadj Ahmed Chabane (born 1695), fourth Dey of Algiers
- Collins Chabane (1960-2015), South African politician
- Saïd Chabane (born 1964), Algerian businessman
- Steve Chabane (born 1978), South African politician
- Lina Chabane (born 1997), Algerian footballer
- Amine Chabane (born 2006), Moroccan footballer
