= Marie-Ange Rousselot =

French politician (born 1987)

Member of the French National Assembly for Sixth constituency for citizens abroad
- Incumbent
- Assumed office 22 October 2024
- Preceded by: Marc Ferracci

Personal details
- Born: 9 September 1987 (age 38)
- Party: Renaissance; Green Liberal Party of Switzerland
- Parent: Colette Nouvel-Rousselot (adoptive mother)

Marie-Ange Rousselot (born 9 September 1987) is a French politician serving as a member of the National Assembly since 2024. She is concurrently a municipal councillor of Touques.
