= Eva Son-Forget =

Korean French politician (b. 1983)

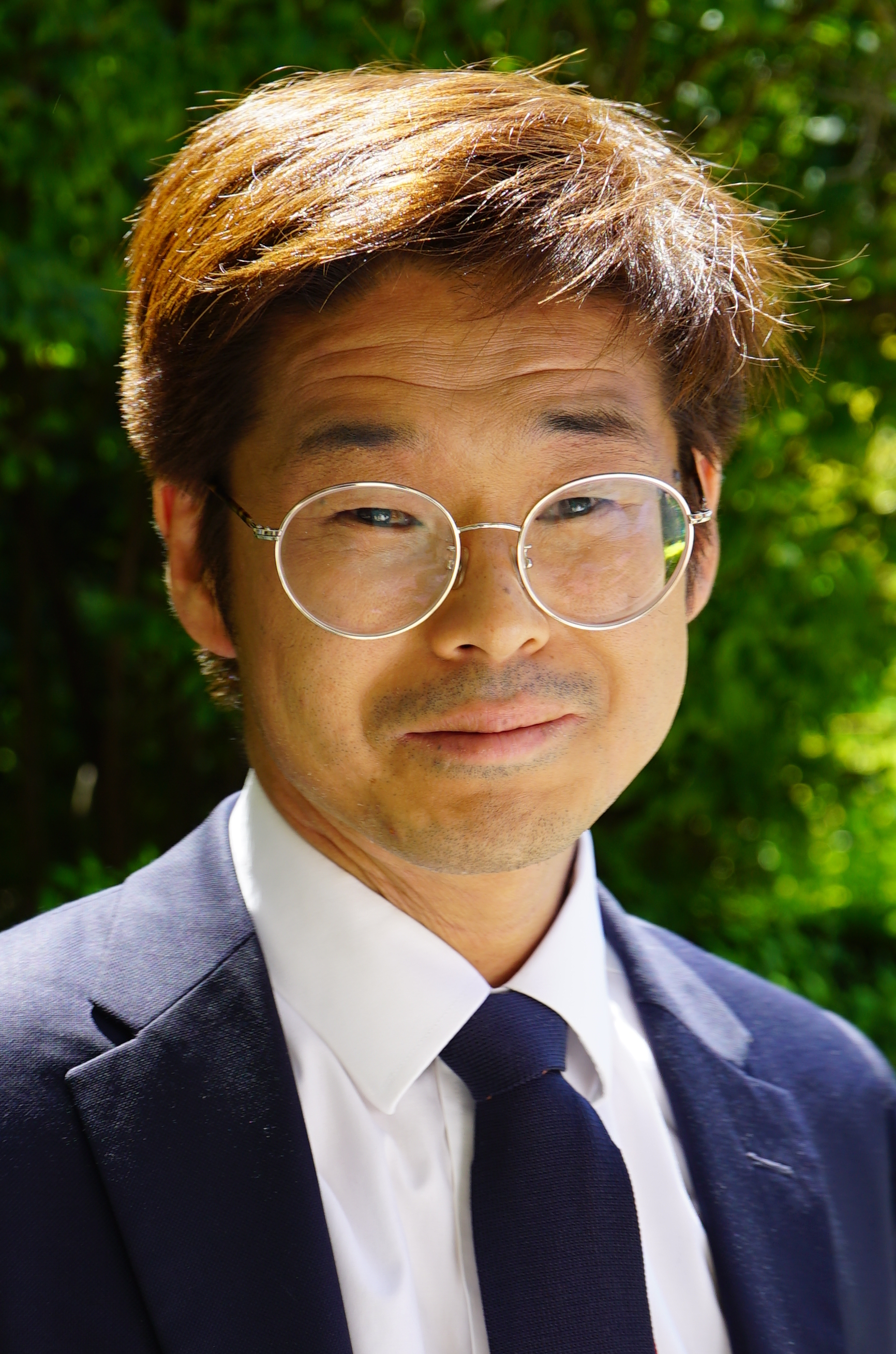
- Son-Forget in 2017

Member of the National Assembly for the 6th constituency for French residents overseas
- In office 21 June 2017 – 21 June 2022
- Preceded by: Claudine Schmid
- Succeeded by: Marc Ferracci

Personal details
- Born: Kim Jae Duk; 15 April 1983 (age 42) Seoul, South Korea
- Party: Independent (since 2022)
- Other political affiliations: Socialist Party (until 2014); La République En Marche! (2017–2018); Valeur Absolue (2019–2021); Reconquête (2022)
- Children: 3
- Profession: Radiologist

Eva Son-Forget (née Kim Jae Duk; Korean: 김재덕; born 15 April 1983), formerly known as Joachim Son-Forget, is a South Korean-born French politician who lives in Switzerland. She also holds Kosovar (since 2018) and Swiss citizenships (since 2020).

Adopted by a French family as a child, Son-Forget holds a doctorate in neuroscience and has experience working as a radiologist in Switzerland. She was previously active within the Socialist Party (PS), then liberal party La République En Marche! (LREM) until she resigned from the party in late 2018. She then founded her own political party Valeur Absolue, and between 2021 and 2022 was active alongside far-right party Reconquête. Son-Forget has variously labeled herself a liberal, a right-winger, a supporter of the European Union and of French President Emmanuel Macron.

Since her election as a member of the National Assembly in 2017, Son-Forget has made multiple appearances in interviews and talk shows and is an active user of social media. On the Internet, her publishing of satirical content and memes drew attention from the press; her use of social media has been described as "trolling" by various media outlets, and has been the subject of controversy within French politics.

== Biography ==
=== Early life ===
Born in South Korea, Son-Forget was adopted by a French family as a child and grew up in Langres, before studying in Dijon, Paris and Lausanne.

In 2005, she received a Master 2 in cognitive science from CogMaster (co-accredited by Paris Descartes University, EHESS and ENS Ulm) with cognitive psychologist Stanislas Dehaene. In 2008 she graduated at the end of the second cycle (Master 2) of medical studies at the University of Burgundy. In 2015, she obtained a doctorate MD-PhD in medicine and cognitive neuroscience. The subject of her thesis was "Visuo-vestibular mechanisms of bodily self-consciousness".

=== Political career ===
Son-Forget supported Socialist candidate François Hollande during the 2012 French presidential election. She was secretary of the Geneva section of the French Socialist Party within the Federation of French Abroad, and chairman of the committee of activists of the Party of European Socialists in Switzerland, before taking leave in 2014. In 2017, she joined then-presidential candidate Emmanuel Macron's political movement, "En Marche!" which later became La République En Marche (LREM).

==== 2017 French legislative election ====
Son-Forget was the LREM candidate in the 2017 French legislative election for the sixth constituency for French residents overseas, which covers Switzerland and Liechtenstein. She progressed to the second round and defeated Republican candidate Claudine Schmid with 74.94% of the vote and 18.78% turnout.

==== Member of the National Assembly ====
As a member of the National Assembly, Son-Forget sat on the Foreign Affairs Committee and served as president of the France-South Korea relations group and vice-president of the France-Kosovo relations group. With La France Insoumise (LFI) member Jean-Luc Mélenchon, she co-wrote a report on France's strategy on seas and oceans.

In October 2018, she was a candidate in an internal election for Executive Officer of LREM, opposing fellow Member of Parliament Stanislas Guerini. She was defeated with 18% of the vote.

On 29 December 2018, Son-Forget resigned from both LREM and its parliamentary group amidst controversy on social networks and a spat with Green Senator Esther Benbassa. She declared she was still supporting President Macron.

On 31 December 2018, Son-Forget announced she would create her own political party, Je suis français et européen ("I am French and European") abbreviated as JSFee. (Note: The abbreviation capitalizes "JSF", which stands for both je suis français (I am French) and the initials of her name at the time.) The party was renamed in July 2019 as Valeur Absolue (which translates to "absolute value").

In January 2019, Son-Forget joined center-right parliamentary group UDI, Agir and Independents and left in December of that year. She sat as a Non-Attached member of the National Assembly for the remainder of her mandate.

==== 2022 French elections ====
In February 2020, invited on talk show Touche pas à mon poste !, Son-Forget announced she would run for the 2022 French presidential election, introducing Alexandre Benalla (former deputy chief of staff to Emmanuel Macron) as one of her supporters. Previously, Son-Forget had attempted to have Benalla hired as her parliamentary assistant, but her application was rejected by the National Assembly.

In 2021, Son-Forget began assisting and actively gathering support for far-right presidential candidate Éric Zemmour early in Zemmour's campaign. Responding to reactions of her endorsement, she insisted that neither she nor Zemmour were far-right, labeling herself as a conservative. After Zemmour was eliminated in the first round of the presidential election, Son-Forget endorsed candidate Emmanuel Macron ahead of the second round.

During the presidential campaign, Son-Forget had expressed her desire to run for the upcoming legislative election, representing Reconquête (the party founded by Zemmour). She eventually ran for re-election in her constituency as an independent candidate and was defeated in the first round with 4.5% of the vote.

In December 2022, Son-Forget announced she had joined the Democratic Union of the Centre (also known as Swiss People's Party or SVP), a national-conservative party in Switzerland. It was later reported that Son-Forget would temporarily join the local branch of the SVP in Yverdon-les-Bains. However, the following month, the SVP announced her application was rejected.

== Controversies ==
On 23 December 2018, through her Twitter account, Son-Forget called out Green Senator Esther Benbassa for her recent remarks on the yellow vests movement; additionally, Son-Forget made derogatory comments about Benbassa's makeup habits. The controversy that ensued prompted her to address "haters" through satirical statements and Internet memes. This behavior was criticized by fellow members of LREM; Executive Officer Stanislas Guerini announced the party would issue her a "warning letter". Son-Forget, who stated her intent was to go viral on social media using "cognitive psychology", refused to apologize, and later declared she was quitting the party.

In December 2019, Son-Forget published online a picture of her posing with nationalist politician Marion Maréchal, describing it as a "teaser". This move was condemned by Jean-Christophe Lagarde, president of parliamentary group UDI, Agir and Independents (UAI) of which Son-Forget had become a member; Lagarde explained that the values of the group were incompatible with nationalism. In response, Son-Forget resigned from UAI.

On 18 April 2020, Son-Forget's Twitter account was edited to impersonate president Emmanuel Macron and began posting messages of satirical nature. Son-Forget later changed her account back to normal, claiming that someone had been maliciously using her account. A similar incident happened in January 2021 after Twitter's permanent account suspension of Donald Trump, when Son-Forget edited her account to impersonate Trump; Twitter subsequently suspended Son-Forget's own account.

== Personal life ==
Son-Forget currently lives in Switzerland with her three children.

Son-Forget has reportedly been passionate about Kosovo since she was a teenager and was a Vice-President of the France-Kosovo relations group in the French National Assembly. In 2018, then-President of Kosovo Hashim Thaçi personally awarded Kosovar citizenship to Son-Forget.

Aside from her political and medical career, Son-Forget plays the harpsichord and practices long range shooting and various martial arts such as karate. In 2019, she recorded a song titled En Couleurs, featuring Doc Gynéco.

In 2024, Son-Forget, born as a male, began reflecting on her gender identity. In November 2024, she publicly came out as a trans woman. Her first name was legally changed to Eva and her gender to female in the Canton of Geneva.

== Legal issues ==
On 15 June 2024, Son-Forget was arrested in Paris after being suspected of driving over the speed limit in the streets of the 7th arrondissement of Paris and failing to stop her car after colliding with another vehicle. She then tested positive for cocaine, a small dose of which was found on her. She was taken into custody, and on 17 June was placed under judicial supervision and charged with failure to obey a police order after reckless driving, driving under the influence and fleeing the scene after causing material damage. Her trial was due for 29 August 2024.

In March 2025, Son-Forget used her still active parliamentary pass to access a residential building on the Rue de l'Université, Paris owned by the National Assembly and burgled an apartment belonging to National Rally politician Manon Bouquin. According to reports, she took alcohol from the minibar and stole clothing owned by Bouquin before fleeing the scene pursued by the security service. The incident was referred to the Paris prosecutor's office with Son-Forget charged with offenses related to "theft" and "violation of domicile."
