= Marc Ferracci =

French politician (born 1977)

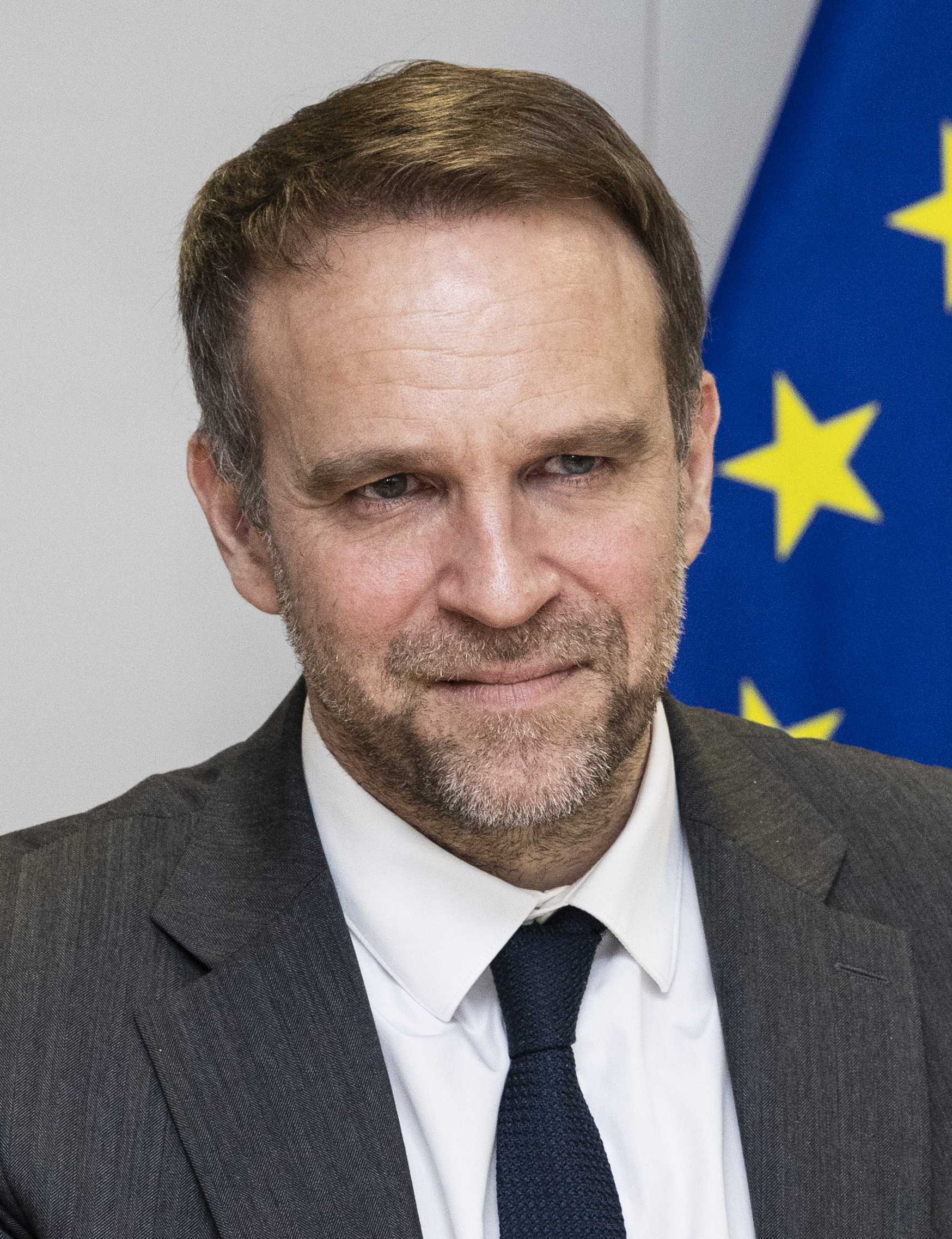
- Marc Ferracci in 2025

Minister for Industry and Energy (Note: Minister Delegate for Industry until 23 December 2024.)
- In office 21 September 2024 – 2025
- Prime Minister: Michel Barnier; François Bayrou
- Preceded by: Roland Lescure

Member of the National Assembly for the 6th constituency for French residents overseas
- Incumbent
- Assumed office 22 June 2022
- Preceded by: Joachim Son-Forget
- Succeeded by: Marie-Ange Rousselot

Personal details
- Born: 19 December 1977 (age 48) Les Lilas, France
- Party: Renaissance
- Spouse: Sophie Ferracci
- Parent: Pierre Ferracci
- Education: HEC Paris; Sciences Po; Paris 1 Panthéon-Sorbonne University

Marc Ferracci (French pronunciation: [maʁk fɛʁatʃi]; born 19 December 1977) is a French politician who served as Minister for Industry and Energy in the government of Prime Minister François Bayrou from 2024 to 2025 and is currently a Member of the National Assembly for the 6th constituency for French residents overseas (Switzerland and Liechtenstein). A member of Renaissance (RE), he previously briefly served as Minister Delegate for Industry in the government of Michel Barnier from September to December 2024.

Ferracci was elected the deputy to the National Assembly for the sixth constituency for French residents overseas in 2022, which encompasses Switzerland and Liechtenstein. He won reelection in 2024. Previously, he had been Emmanuel Macron's economy adviser in Macron's 2017 presidential campaign; he was named a special adviser to Labour Minister Muriel Pénicaud following the election. In 2020, he became an adviser to Prime Minister Jean Castex.

Ferracci has been described as a close friend and political ally to President Macron.

== Private career ==
An economist by occupation, Ferracci graduated from HEC Paris and Sciences Po. He made academic contributions as a professor at Panthéon-Assas University specialising in economics and labour policy, including his involvement in the reform of employment systems in France. His expertise spans various fields earning him recognition as a nominee for the Best Young French Economist Award in 2016.

== Personal life ==
Ferracci met Emmanuel Macron in 1999 when they were students at Sciences Po. Both were each other's best men at their weddings; in 2004, Ferracci married Sophie Gagnant, who was Macron's chief of staff in his 2017 presidential campaign before joining Health Minister Agnès Buzyn as chief of staff following the election. She had previously been an aide to Macron in 2016 in the final months of his tenure as Economy Minister.

His family is from Suartone, a Corsican hamlet in the municipality of Bonifacio.

== See also ==
- List of deputies of the 16th National Assembly of France
