= Lina Chabane =

Association football player (born 1997)

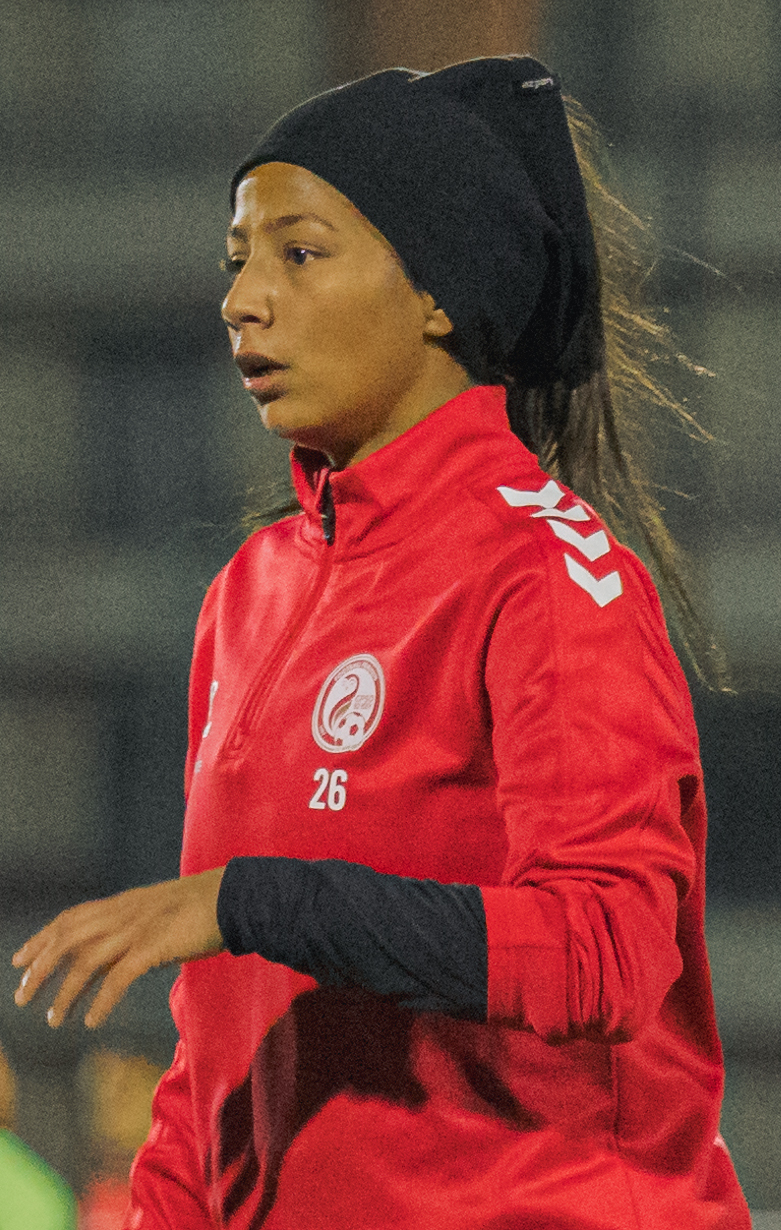
- Chabane in 2023

Personal information
- Date of birth: 14 April 1997 (age 29)
- Place of birth: Les Lilas, France
- Position: Midfielder

Team information
- Current team: Fleury
- Number: 26

Youth career
- –2013: Le Mans

Senior career*
Years	Team	Apps	(Gls)
2013–2016	Tremblay	44	(10)
2016–2017	Brest	11	(1)
2017–2020	Saint-Denis	19	(0)
2020	Montauban	4	(1)
2021–	Fleury	6	(0)

International career^{‡}
2016–	Algeria	5	(0)
2021	Morocco	2	(0)
- * Club domestic league appearances and goals as of 4 June 2021 ‡ National team caps and goals as of 14 June 2021

Lina Chabane (Arabic: لينا شعبان; born 14 April 1997) is a footballer who plays as a midfielder for Division 1 Féminine club FC Fleury 91. Born in France and a two-time international for Morocco, she plays for the Algeria national team.

== Club career ==
Chabane is a Le Mans FC product. She has played for FC Tremblay En France, Stade Brestois 29, RC Saint-Denis, Montauban FC and Fleury in France.

== International career ==
=== Algeria ===
In 2016, Chabane was called up for the first time to the Algeria national team on the occasion of a preparation course for the CAN qualifiers.

=== Morocco ===
Chabane made her senior debut for Morocco on 10 June 2021 as a substitute in a 3–0 friendly home win over Mali. Her first match as a starter player was four days later against the same opponent.

== Personal life ==
Chabane's younger brother, Amine Chabane, is also a professional footballer and youth international for both Algeria and Morocco.

== See also ==
- List of Morocco women's international footballers
