= Amine Chabane =

Moroccan footballer (born 2003)

Personal information
- Full name: Amine Amar Omar Chabane
- Date of birth: 15 August 2006 (age 20)
- Place of birth: Les Lilas, France
- Height: 1.91 m (6 ft 3 in)
- Position: Defender

Team information
- Current team: Amiens
- Number: 39

Youth career
- 2014–2017: FC 93
- 2017–2022: SFC Neuilly-sur-Marne
- 2022–2023: Red Star
- 2023–2024: Amiens

Senior career*
Years	Team	Apps	(Gls)
2024–	Amiens	37	(1)

International career^{‡}
2022	Algeria U17	2	(0)
2024	Morocco U18	2	(0)
2024	Morocco U20	1	(0)
- * Club domestic league appearances and goals as of 12 May 2026 ‡ National team caps and goals as of 19:20, 11 August 2025 (UTC)

Amine Amar Omar Chabane (Arabic: أمين عمار عمر شعبان; born 15 August 2006) is a professional football player who plays as a defender for Ligue 3 club Amiens. Born in France and a former youth international for Algeria, he is most recently a youth international for Morocco.

== Club career ==
Chabane is a product of the youth academies of FC 93, SFC Neuilly-sur-Marne, Red Star and Amiens. He made his senior and professional debut with Amiens in a 3–1 Ligue 2 win over Grenoble on 17 May 2024. On 6 July 2024, he signed his first professional contract with Amiens until 2027 for €45 000 per month

== International career ==
Chabane was born in France to an Algerian father and Moroccan mother, and holds triple French-Algerian-Moroccan citizenship. He was first called up to the Algeria U17s for a set of friendlies in October 2022. He was called up to the Algeria U17s for the 2023 U-17 Africa Cup of Nations, but wasn't released by his club. In May 2024, he opted to play for Morocco internationally and was called up to the Morocco U18s for a set of friendlies.

== Personal life ==
Chabane's older sister, Lina, is also a professional footballer who plays for the Algeria women's national team.
