= James Zhou =

Chinese businessman (born 1961)

- Born: Zhou Yunjie; 28 April 1961 (age 65); China
- Occupation: Football club owner
- Organization: Auxerre

Zhou Yunjie (Chinese: 周云杰; born 28 April 1961) is a Chinese businessman who is the majority owner of Auxerre.

== Career ==
Zhou founded Chinese manufacturing company ORG Technology with his mother in 1984. In 2014, Zhou bought French winery Château Renon. During the autumn of 2016, he became majority owner of French side Auxerre, helping the club achieve promotion from the second tier to the top flight.

== Personal life ==
Zhou was born on 28 April 1961. Born in China, he grew up in Beijing, China. Growing up, he played ice hockey. Married, he has a son.
