= Sophie Ferracci =

French business lawyer (born 1976)

- Born: Sophie Gagnant; 1976 (age 49–50); France
- Education: HEC Paris
- Occupation: Lawyer
- Spouse: Marc Ferracci
- Relatives: Pierre Ferracci (father-in-law)

Sophie Gagnant-Ferracci (born 1976) is a French business lawyer. During the 2017 French presidential election, she headed Emmanuel Macron's staff. She is married to economist and politician Marc Ferracci.

== Biographie ==
In January 2016 she became the head of the staff of Emmanuel Macron at the ministry of Economy. She left her role when Emmanuel Macron resigned and became his chief aide in his movement (En Marche!) for the French presidential election of 2017.
