= Sixth French legislative constituency for citizens abroad =

Constituency for French residents overseas

6th constituency for French residents overseas
- inline Constituency of the National Assembly of France

- Deputy: Marc Ferracci; RE
- Department: None (overseas residents)
- Cantons: None
- Registered voters: 159,733

The Sixth French legislative constituency for citizens abroad (sixième circonscription des Français établis hors de France) is one of eleven constituencies each electing one representative of French people living outside France to the National Assembly.

== Area ==
This constituency is the smallest of the eleven by area. It covers two countries: Switzerland and Liechtenstein. As of New Year's Day 2011, it contained 145,108 registered French voters. Virtually all of these live in Switzerland, which has a greater number of registered French residents than any other country in the world.

This constituency elected its first ever representative at the 2012 French legislative election.

== Deputies ==
Election	Member	Party
2012	Claudine Schmid	UMP
2017	Eva Son-Forget	LREM
2018	Eva Son-Forget	SE
2021	Eva Son-Forget	REC
2022	Marc Ferracci	LREM
2024	Marc Ferracci	RE

== Election results ==
=== 2024 ===
Candidate	Party	Alliance	First round		Second round	
Candidate	Party	Alliance	Votes	%	Votes	%
Marc Ferracci	RE	Ensemble	25,590	40.54	34,771	59.48
Halima Delimi	PS	NFP	19,446	30.81	23,687	40.52
Déborah Merceron	RN		9,158	14.51		
Olivier Corticchiato	LR	UDC	4,172	6.61		
Jacques De Causans	DVC		1,888	2.99		
Philippe Tissot	REC		949	1.50		
Marie-Julie Jacquemot	Volt		651	1.03		
Arnaud Dorthe	DIV		627	0.99		
Céline von Auw	ECO		419	0.66		
Michèle Sellès-Lefranc	PRG		222	0.35		
Valid votes			63,122	100.00	58,458	100.00
Blank votes			588	0.92	4,740	7.49
Null votes			88	0.14	99	0.16
Turnout			63,798	39.94	63,297	39.63
Abstentions			95,948	60.06	96,436	60.37
Registered voters			159,746		159,733	
Result			RE HOLD			

=== 2022 ===
Legislative Election 2022: 6th constituency for French citizens overseas
Party	Candidate	Votes	%	±%
LREM (Ensemble)	Marc Ferracci	12,233	36.49	-27.06
LFI (NUPÉS)	Magali Mangin	6,798	20.28	+6.57
DVC	Roxane Corbran	2,988	8.91	N/A
LR (UDC)	Régine Mazloum-Martin	2,866	8.55	−7.21
REC	Philippe Tissot	2,210	6.59	N/A
PRG	Guillaume Grosso	2,017	6.02	+5.94
DVD	Joachim Son-Forget	1,503	4.48	N/A
RN	Chantal Rusail	1,297	3.87	+0.98
Others	N/A	1,615	4.81	−
Turnout		33,527	22.63	+2.44
2nd round result
LREM (Ensemble)	Marc Ferracci	23,441	64.97	-9.97
LFI (NUPÉS)	Magali Mangin	12,638	35.03	N/A
Turnout		36,079	25.41	+6.63
LREM hold				

=== 2017 ===
Candidate	Label	First round		Second round	
Candidate	Label	Votes	%	Votes	%
Joachim Son-Forget	REM	16,273	63.55	17,460	74.94
Claudine Schmid	LR	4,036	15.76	5,838	25.06
Jean Rossiaud	ECO	2,037	7.96		
Emmanuelle Boudet	FI	1,404	5.48		
Jean-Claude Marchand	FN	741	2.89		
Geneviève Marion	DVD	383	1.50		
Vincent Souchaud	DIV	224	0.87		
Joseph Kuszli	DVG	131	0.51		
Martine Lerond	EXD	111	0.43		
Tie Watanabe	DIV	70	0.27		
Fabienne Lefebvre	PCF	68	0.27		
Pierre Augustin	DIV	56	0.22		
Ernesto Priarollo	DVD	51	0.20		
Odile Leperre-Verrier	PRG	20	0.08		
Votes		25,605	100.00	23,298	100.00
Valid votes		25,605	99.46	23,298	97.30
Blank votes		47	0.18	521	2.18
Null votes		92	0.36	126	0.53
Turnout		25,744	20.19	23,945	18.78
Abstentions		101,742	79.81	103,525	81.22
Registered voters		127,486		127,470	
Source: Ministry of the Interior

=== 2012 ===
==== Candidates ====
The list of candidates was officially finalised on 14 May. There were twenty-one candidates:

The Socialist Party chose Nicole Castioni, a resident of Geneva, as its candidate. She was a magistrate in the Criminal Court of Geneva, and, having dual French and Swiss citizenship, was an elected representative in the Parliament of Geneva from 1993 to 2001. Her deputy (suppléant) was Louis Lepioufle, also a resident of Geneva.

The Union for a Popular Movement chose Claudine Schmid. Sébastien Brack was her deputy (suppléant).

Europe Écologie–The Greens chose Ximena Kaiser Morris, with Jean Rossiaud as her deputy (suppléant). A resident of Lausanne, Kaiser Morris was also a member of the Green Party of Switzerland.

The Left Front (which unites several parties, most notably the French Communist Party and the Left Party) chose Magali Orsini, a long-term resident of Geneva and active participant in that city's left-wing politics. She was a Chartered Accountant, former lecturer in tax law and former assessor. Pierre Gauthier was her deputy (suppléant).

The National Front chose Christiane Floquet. Serge Mohler was her deputy (suppléant).

The centre-right Radical Party and the centrist Republican, Ecologist and Social Alliance jointly chose Marie-Françoise d'Anglemont as their candidate, with Marcel Paquier as her deputy (suppléant). She had dual French and Swiss citizenship, and had a political career in the Swiss Canton of Geneva.

The Radical Party of the Left chose Laila Barki, who worked in pharmaceuticals in Geneva. Philippe Berger was her deputy (suppléant).

The Pirate Party chose Romain Devouassoux, with Xavier Gillard as his deputy.

Solidarity and Progress, the French branch of the LaRouche movement, was represented by Odile Mojon, with Christophe Laverne as her deputy. Mojon, who worked as a documentarist translator, had dual French and Swiss citizenship.

Joseph Kuzsli was the candidate of the European Social-Democratic Party, with Pierre Baccale-Ramonatxco as his deputy.

Micheline Spoerri, former Minister for Police and Security in the government of the canton of Geneva, stood as the candidate of the "Independent Right". Jean-Patrick Bourcart is her deputy.

Pierre-Jean Duvivier, a resident of Switzerland, was an independent candidate, wishing to "strictly defend the private sector against the multiple attempts to constrain it". Tatiana Zhyvylo was his deputy.

Didier Salavert described himself as an "independent liberal" candidate, in the French meaning of the word (i.e. classical liberalism). Pierre Chappaz was his deputy. He was endorsed by the Liberal Democratic Party.

The other independent candidates were: Bernard Garcia (with Gloria Giol as deputy); Guy Broustine (with Isabelle Lovera as deputy); Sébastien Jacques (with Annat Jacques as deputy); Nicolas Miguet (with Guillaume Barthelemey as deputy); Serge Cyril Vinet (with Sylvie Boutard as deputy); Christian Robert (with Tatiana Robert as deputy); Didier Tailliez (with Jean-Michel Barreyre as deputy); and Gérard Andrieux (with Geneviève Berthin-Hugault as deputy).

==== Results ====
As in the other expatriate constituencies, turnout in the first round was low. It was one of only three expatriate constituencies in which the main candidate of the right finished first.

Independent candidate Sébastien Jacques received a single vote (out of 23,390 votes cast). He had stood as representative of the International Capitalist Party, his main platform being the adoption by France of the Swiss fiscal model, and a rejection of the French government's "nauseating and unhealthy" efforts against tax evasion by expatriates.

Legislative Election 2012: Overseas residents 6 - 2nd round
Party	Candidate	Votes	%	±%
UMP	Claudine Schmid	13,525	57.54	−
PS	Nicole Castioni	9,982	42.46	−
Turnout		23,872	22.38	
UMP win (new seat)				

Legislative Election 2012: Overseas residents 6 - 1st round
Party	Candidate	Votes	%	±%
UMP	Claudine Schmid	7 925	34.20	−
PS	Nicole Castioni	6 276	27.09	−
EELV	Ximena Kaiser Morris	1 280	5.52	−
FN	Christiane Floquet	1 223	5.28	−
DVD	Micheline Spoerri	1 151	4.97	−
DVD	Didier Salavert	1 106	4.77	−
FG	Magali Orsini	900	3.88	−
Radical	Marie-Françoise d'Anglemont	867	3.74	−
Independent	Bernard Garcia	625	2.70	−
Independent	Serge Cyril Vinet	517	2.24	−
ESDP	Joseph Kuzsli	248	1.07	−
PP	Romain Devouassoux	245	1.06	−
Independent	Gérard Andrieux	223	0.96	−
Independent	Nicolas Miguet	214	0.92	−
PRG	Laila Barki	113	0.49	−
Independent	Christian Robert	85	0.37	−
SP	Odile Mojon	75	0.32	−
DVD	Pierre-Jean Duvivier	71	0.31	−
Independent	Didier Tailliez	19	0.08	−
Independent	Guy Broustine	5	0.02	−
Independent	Sébastien Jacques	1	0.00	−
Turnout		23 390	21.9	−
