= Saïd Chabane =

Algerian businessman

Saïd Chabane (Arabic: سعيد شعبان; born 1964) is an Algerian businessman. He founded the Cosnelle meat company in France in 1997. He was the owner of Angers SCO football club from 2011 to 2023, during which time the club returned to Ligue 1 and reached a Coupe de France final. He resigned due to accusations of sexual assault, for which he was convicted and sentenced to two years in prison.

== Early life and career ==
Born in Algiers, Chabane is of Algerian Kabyle origin and was born in a family of seven children. Chabane studied at the Polytechnic University in his home city before enrolling at Mines Paris – PSL. In 1991 he trained as a consultant in Angers.

Unemployed in 1997, Chabane put his 30,000 French franc wealth into establishing Cosnelle, a meat company that had a turnover of €55 million in 2011. As of 2011, he and his wife Isabelle had three children.

== Angers SCO ==
In November 2011, Chabane became the owner and president of French football club Angers SCO. He named Jean-Michel Aulas of Olympique Lyonnais and Louis Nicollin of Montpellier HSC as his favourite other owners in French football, due to the former's results and the latter's outspokenness.

Chabane's club were promoted from Ligue 2 in 2014–15, reaching Ligue 1 for the first time since 1994. They finished 9th the following season, having led early in the season. They reached the 100th final of the Coupe de France in 2017, losing to Paris Saint-Germain F.C.; they had also lost on their only other appearance 60 years earlier.

== Sexual assault convictions ==
In February 2020, four current or former employees of Chabane made police reports accusing him of sexual assault between 2014 and 2019. The victims were aged 20 to 25 at the time of the assaults.

Chabane resigned in March 2023, with Angers in last place and soon to be relegated from Ligue 1; he was succeeded by his son Romain. Earlier the same month, manager Abdel Bouhazama had resigned over remarks about sexual harassment.

In March 2024, Chabane was sentenced to two years in prison for six counts of sexual assault against female employees of Angers SCO and Cosnelle, with a further year as a suspended sentence. He was acquitted of a seventh charge.
