= Pierre Ferracci =

French businessman (born 1952)

- Born: 11 June 1952 (age 74); Corse-du-Sud, France
- Occupation: Businessman
- Known for: President of Paris FC
- Children: 2, including Marc
- Relatives: Sophie Ferracci (daughter-in-law)

Pierre Ferracci (born 11 June 1952) is a French businessman and an expert in social policy. He heads the Groupe Alpha, a consulting group he founded. He has been president of Paris FC since 2012.

== Early life ==
Pierre Ferracci was born on 11 June 1952 in Suartone, Corse-du-Sud. He is the son of Albert Ferracci, a figure of the Resistance and leader of the Communist Party in Corsica, and a teacher unionist mother. He is a chartered accountant by training. He also holds a master's degree in applied economics from Paris-Dauphine University and a graduate degree in economics.

He is the father of the economist Marc Ferracci and François Ferracci, a former player of the Paris FC, and the father-in-law of the lawyer Sophie Ferracci.
