= Opinion polling for the 2022 French presidential election =

This page lists public opinion polls conducted for the 2022 French presidential election, of which the first round was held on 10 April 2022. Since no candidate won a majority of the vote in the first round, the second round election was held between the top two candidates on 24 April 2022.

== First round ==
=== Graphical summary ===
The following graphical summary represents the polling numbers of the following candidates: (Note: The candidates are listed according to their rough position on the political spectrum, beginning with left-wing candidate and ending with right-wing candidates.)

- Nathalie Arthaud (Lutte Ouvrière)
- Philippe Poutou (Nouveau Parti anticapitaliste)
- Fabien Roussel (Parti communiste français)
- Jean-Luc Mélenchon (La France insoumise)
- Christiane Taubira (divers gauche, withdrawn)
- Anne Hidalgo (Parti socialiste)
- Arnaud Montebourg (divers gauche, withdrawn)
- Yannick Jadot (Europe Écologie Les Verts)
- Emmanuel Macron (La République en Marche!)
- Jean Lassalle (Résistons!)
- Valérie Pécresse (Les Républicains)
- Nicolas Dupont-Aignan (Debout la France)
- Marine Le Pen (Rassemblement national)
- Éric Zemmour (Reconquête)
Local regression of polls conducted since 2021

=== 2022 ===
==== Official campaign ====
This table below lists polls completed since the publication of the official list of candidates on 7 March.

Polling firm	Fieldwork date	Sample size												
Polling firm	Fieldwork date	Sample size	Arthaud LO	Poutou NPA	Roussel PCF	Mélenchon LFI	Hidalgo PS	Jadot EELV	Macron LREM	Pécresse LR	Lassalle RES	Dupont- Aignan DLF	Le Pen RN	Zemmour REC
2022 election	10 Apr 2022	-	0.56%	0.76%	2.28%	21.95%	1.74%	4.63%	27.85%	4.78%	3.13%	2.06%	23.15%	7.07%
Ipsos	8 Apr 2022	10,425	0.5%	1%	3%	17.5%	2%	5%	26.5%	8.5%	2%	2.5%	22.5%	9%
Harris-Interactive	7–8 Apr 2022	1,889	0.5%	1%	2.5%	18%	2%	4.5%	27%	8%	2%	2%	24%	8.5%
Elabe	7–8 Apr 2022	1,691	0.5%	1%	2.5%	17.5%	2%	4%	26%	8%	2.5%	2.5%	25%	8.5%
Cluster17	6–8 Apr 2022	3,097	0.5%	1%	2.5%	18%	2%	4%	26%	9%	3%	3%	21%	9.5%
Ipsos-Sopra Steria	6–8 Apr 2022	1,709	0.5%	1%	3%	16.5%	2.5%	5%	26.5%	8.5%	2%	2.5%	23%	9%
OpinionWay-Kéa	5–8 Apr 2022	2,041	1%	1%	3%	17%	2%	5%	26%	9%	3%	2%	22%	9%
Ifop-Fiducial	5–8 Apr 2022	3,016	0.5%	1%	2.5%	17%	2%	5%	26%	9%	2.5%	1.5%	24%	9%
BVA	6–7 Apr 2022	1,010	0.5%	1%	2.5%	17.5%	2.5%	4.5%	26%	8.5%	2.5%	2%	23%	9.5%
Ipsos-Sopra Steria	5–7 Apr 2022	1,716	0.5%	1%	3.5%	16.5%	2%	5.5%	26.5%	8.5%	2.5%	2%	23%	8.5%
OpinionWay-Kéa	4–7 Apr 2022	2,043	1%	1%	3%	17%	2%	5%	26%	9%	3%	2%	22%	9%
Ifop-Fiducial	4–7 Apr 2022	3,010	0.5%	1%	2.5%	17.5%	2%	4.5%	26.5%	9%	2.5%	1.5%	24%	8.5%
YouGov	4–7 Apr 2022	1,783	1%	1%	2%	16%	1%	5%	26%	6%	3%	2%	23%	13%
Odoxa	5–6 Apr 2022	1,897	1%	1%	3%	16%	2%	5%	28%	7%	3%	2%	24%	8%
AtlasIntel	4–6 Apr 2022	1,946	0.6%	0.4%	2.2%	18.6%	2.3%	5%	27.8%	5.3%	1.3%	2.9%	21.3%	12%
Ipsos-Sopra Steria	4–6 Apr 2022	1,712	0.5%	1%	3.5%	17%	2%	6%	27%	8%	2.5%	2%	22%	8.5%
OpinionWay-Kéa	3–6 Apr 2022	1,902	<1%	1%	3%	16%	2%	5%	27%	9%	3%	2%	23%	9%
Ifop-Fiducial	2–6 Apr 2022	3,010	0.5%	0.5%	2.5%	17.5%	2%	4.5%	27%	9%	2%	2%	23.5%	9%
Kantar	4–5 Apr 2022	1,394	0.5%	1%	3%	16%	2.5%	5%	25%	8%	3%	2%	23%	11%
Elabe	4–5 Apr 2022	1,538	0.5%	1.5%	2.5%	15.5%	2%	5%	28%	8%	3%	2%	23%	9%
Ipsos-Sopra Steria	3–5 Apr 2022	1,719	0.5%	1%	3.5%	16.5%	2%	5.5%	27%	8%	3%	2.5%	20.5%	10%
OpinionWay-Kéa	2–5 Apr 2022	1,777	<1%	1%	3%	15%	2%	6%	27%	9%	3%	2%	23%	9%
Ifop-Fiducial	1–5 Apr 2022	3,007	0.5%	0.5%	3%	16.5%	2.5%	4.5%	27%	9.5%	2%	1.5%	23%	9.5%
Ipsos	2–4 Apr 2022	12,600	0.5%	1%	3.5%	16%	2%	6%	26.5%	8.5%	2.5%	2%	21.5%	10%
Cluster17	2–4 Apr 2022	2,793	0.5%	1%	2.5%	17%	2%	4%	26%	10%	3%	3%	20%	11%
Harris-Interactive	1–4 Apr 2022	2,531	0.5%	1%	2.5%	17%	2%	5%	26.5%	9.5%	2%	1.5%	23%	9.5%
OpinionWay-Kéa	1–4 Apr 2022	1,666	<1%	1%	3%	14%	2%	6%	28%	9%	3%	3%	22%	9%
Ipsos-Sopra Steria	1–4 Apr 2022	1,687	0.5%	1%	3.5%	16%	2%	5.5%	26.5%	8.5%	3%	2%	21%	10.5%
Ifop-Fiducial	31 Mar–4 Apr 2022	3,008	0.5%	1%	3%	15.5%	2%	4.5%	27.5%	10%	2%	2%	22%	10%
OpinionWay	2–3 Apr 2022	1,091	<1%	1%	4%	14%	2%	6%	27%	10%	3%	2%	22%	9%
Ipsos-Sopra Steria	30 Mar–2 Apr 2022	1,963	0.5%	1.5%	3%	15.5%	2%	6%	26%	9.5%	2.5%	1.5%	21%	11%
Ifop	31 Mar–1 Apr 2022	1,405	0.5%	1%	3.5%	15%	2%	5%	27%	9%	2.5%	2%	22%	10.5%
Elabe	31 Mar–1 Apr 2022	1,377	0.5%	1.5%	3.5%	15%	1.5%	4.5%	28.5%	8.5%	2.5%	2.5%	22%	9.5%
OpinionWay-Kéa	29 Mar–1 Apr 2022	1,576	1%	1%	3%	15%	3%	5%	28%	9%	3%	2%	20%	10%
Ipsos-Sopra Steria	29 Mar–1 Apr 2022	1,708	0.5%	1%	3%	16%	2%	6.5%	26.5%	9.5%	2.5%	1.5%	20%	11%
Ifop-Fiducial	29 Mar–1 Apr 2022	2,994	0.5%	1%	3.5%	15%	1.5%	4.5%	28%	9.5%	2%	2%	21.5%	11%
BVA	30–31 Mar 2022	1,502	1%	1%	3.5%	15.5%	2%	5%	27%	9.5%	2.5%	2.5%	21%	9.5%
OpinionWay	30–31 Mar 2022	1,044	1%	1%	4%	15%	2%	5%	27%	10%	2%	3%	21%	10%
Cluster17	29–31 Mar 2022	2,515	0.5%	1%	3%	16%	2%	5%	27%	10%	2.5%	3%	18%	12%
YouGov	28–31 Mar 2022	1,434	0%	1%	2%	15%	1%	6%	27%	8%	3%	2%	25%	9%
OpinionWay-Kéa	28–31 Mar 2022	1,562	1%	1%	3%	15%	2%	5%	28%	10%	3%	2%	20%	10%
Ipsos-Sopra Steria	28–31 Mar 2022	1,728	0.5%	1.5%	3%	15.5%	2%	6%	27%	9%	2.5%	1.5%	20%	11.5%
Ifop-Fiducial	28–31 Mar 2022	2,995	0.5%	0.5%	4%	15.5%	1.5%	4.5%	28%	10%	2%	1.5%	21%	11%
Elabe	28–30 Mar 2022	1,531	0.5%	1.5%	2.5%	15.5%	2%	4%	28%	9.5%	2.5%	2.5%	21%	10.5%
OpinionWay-Kéa	27–30 Mar 2022	1,633	1%	1%	3%	15%	2%	5%	28%	11%	3%	1%	20%	10%
Ipsos-Sopra Steria	27–30 Mar 2022	1,728	0.5%	1.5%	3%	15.5%	1.5%	6%	27%	9%	2%	2%	20.5%	11.5%
Ifop-Fiducial	26–30 Mar 2022	2,494	0.5%	0.5%	4%	15%	2%	4.5%	28%	10.5%	1.5%	1.5%	21.5%	10.5%
OpinionWay-Kéa	26–29 Mar 2022	1,617	1%	1%	3%	15%	2%	5%	28%	11%	3%	1%	20%	10%
Ipsos-Sopra Steria	25–29 Mar 2022	1,738	0.5%	1.5%	3.5%	15%	2%	6%	27%	9%	2%	2%	19.5%	12%
Ifop-Fiducial	25–29 Mar 2022	2,004	0.5%	1%	3.5%	14.5%	2%	5%	27.5%	10.5%	2%	1.5%	21%	11%
Harris-Interactive	25–28 Mar 2022	2,384	0.5%	1%	3%	15%	2.5%	5%	28.5%	9.5%	2%	2%	21%	10%
OpinionWay-Kéa	25–28 Mar 2022	1,627	1%	1%	3%	14%	2%	5%	28%	11%	3%	2%	20%	10%
Ifop-Fiducial	25–28 Mar 2022	1,501	0.5%	0.5%	3.5%	14%	2.5%	5%	28%	11%	1.5%	1.5%	21%	11%
Ipsos-Sopra Steria	24–28 Mar 2022	1,723	0.5%	1%	3.5%	15.5%	2%	6%	27.5%	10%	2%	2%	18.5%	11.5%
OpinionWay	26–27 Mar 2022	1,072	1%	1%	4%	14%	2%	6%	27%	10%	3%	2%	20%	10%
Cluster17	25–27 Mar 2022	2,578	1%	1.5%	3%	15%	2%	5.5%	27%	10%	3%	2.5%	17%	12.5%
Ipsos-Sopra Steria	23–26 Mar 2022	1,726	0.5%	1%	3.5%	14.5%	2.5%	6%	28.5%	10%	2.5%	2.5%	17.5%	11%
OpinionWay-Kéa	22–25 Mar 2022	1,636	1%	1%	4%	13%	2%	5%	27%	12%	3%	1%	21%	10%
Ipsos-Sopra Steria	22–25 Mar 2022	1,718	0.5%	1%	3.5%	13.5%	2.5%	6%	29%	10%	2.5%	2.5%	18.5%	10.5%
Ifop-Fiducial	22–25 Mar 2022	1,504	0.5%	0.5%	3.5%	14%	2%	5%	28%	11.5%	2%	1.5%	20.5%	11%
Cluster17	22–24 Mar 2022	2,353	0.5%	1.5%	4%	14.5%	1.5%	5%	27%	11%	3%	2.5%	17%	12.5%
Ipsos	21–24 Mar 2022	13,269	0.5%	1.5%	3.5%	14%	2%	7%	28%	10%	2.5%	2%	17.5%	11.5%
OpinionWay-Kéa	21–24 Mar 2022	1,619	1%	1%	4%	14%	2%	5%	28%	12%	3%	1%	20%	9%
Ipsos-Sopra Steria	21–24 Mar 2022	1,724	0.5%	1%	4%	12.5%	2%	6.5%	29.5%	10%	2.5%	2%	19%	10.5%
Ifop-Fiducial	21–24 Mar 2022	1,505	0.5%	0.5%	3.5%	14%	2%	4.5%	28.5%	11.5%	2%	1.5%	20%	11.5%
BVA	22–23 Mar 2022	958	0.5%	1.5%	3%	14.5%	2%	6%	28%	10.5%	2.5%	1.5%	19%	11%
Kantar	21–23 Mar 2022	1,388	1%	1%	3%	14%	2%	4.5%	29%	10%	2%	2.5%	20%	11%
OpinionWay-Kéa	20–23 Mar 2022	1,614	1%	2%	3%	14%	2%	6%	28%	11%	2%	2%	20%	9%
Ipsos-Sopra Steria	20–23 Mar 2022	1,721	1%	1%	4%	12.5%	2%	7%	29.5%	9.5%	2.5%	1.5%	18.5%	11%
Ifop-Fiducial	19–23 Mar 2022	1,507	0.5%	0.5%	3.5%	14%	2%	5%	28%	11%	2.5%	1%	20%	12%
OpinionWay-Kéa	19–22 Mar 2022	1,626	1%	2%	3%	14%	2%	5%	29%	12%	2%	2%	19%	9%
Ipsos-Sopra Steria	18–22 Mar 2022	1,741	1%	1%	4%	13%	2.5%	7%	29.5%	9.5%	2.5%	1.5%	17.5%	11%
Ifop-Fiducial	18–22 Mar 2022	1,506	0.5%	0.5%	4%	13.5%	2%	5.5%	28%	10.5%	2.5%	1%	19.5%	12.5%
Elabe	20–21 Mar 2022	1,551	0.5%	1.5%	3.5%	15%	1.5%	4.5%	27.5%	10%	3%	3%	20%	10%
Harris-Interactive	18–21 Mar 2022	2,344	0.5%	1%	3%	14%	2.5%	5%	29.5%	10%	2%	2%	19.5%	11%
OpinionWay-Kéa	18–21 Mar 2022	1,636	1%	1%	4%	13%	3%	5%	29%	13%	2%	2%	18%	9%
Ipsos-Sopra Steria	17–21 Mar 2022	1,748	0.5%	1%	3.5%	13%	3%	6.5%	30.5%	10%	3%	2%	17%	10%
Ifop-Fiducial	18–21 Mar 2022	1,508	0%	0.5%	4%	14%	2%	5.5%	28%	10.5%	3%	1.5%	18.5%	12.5%
OpinionWay	19–20 Mar 2022	1,092	1%	1%	4%	13%	3%	5%	29%	13%	3%	1%	17%	10%
Cluster17	18–20 Mar 2022	2,527	0.5%	1.5%	3.5%	14.5%	1.5%	5.5%	28%	10.5%	3%	2.5%	16.5%	12.5%
Ipsos-Sopra Steria	16–19 Mar 2022	1,723	0.5%	1%	3.5%	13%	3%	6%	30.5%	10%	3%	2%	16.5%	11%
Ifop	17–18 Mar 2022	1,359	0%	0.5%	4%	13%	2%	5.5%	29.5%	11%	2%	2%	18.5%	12%
OpinionWay-Kéa	15–18 Mar 2022	1,542	<1%	1%	4%	13%	3%	5%	29%	12%	3%	2%	17%	11%
Ipsos-Sopra Steria	15–18 Mar 2022	1,684	0.5%	1.5%	3.5%	12%	2.5%	6%	31%	11%	3%	2%	15.5%	11.5%
Ifop-Fiducial	15–18 Mar 2022	1,507	0%	0.5%	4.5%	13.5%	2%	5%	29%	11%	2.5%	1.5%	17.5%	13%
OpinionWay-Kéa	14–17 Mar 2022	1,550	<1%	1%	4%	12%	3%	6%	29%	12%	3%	2%	17%	11%
Ipsos-Sopra Steria	14–17 Mar 2022	1,650	0.5%	1.5%	3.5%	12%	2.5%	6%	31%	11%	2.5%	2%	15.5%	12%
Ifop-Fiducial	14–17 Mar 2022	1,506	0.5%	0.5%	4.5%	12.5%	2%	5%	30%	10.5%	2.5%	1.5%	17.5%	13%
OpinionWay	15–16 Mar 2022	1,032	1%	1%	4%	11%	2%	6%	29%	11%	2%	3%	18%	12%
BVA	15–16 Mar 2022	1,505	0.5%	0.5%	3.5%	13%	2.5%	5.5%	30%	10%	1.5%	2%	18%	13%
Elabe	15–16 Mar 2022	1,580	0.5%	1%	3.5%	14%	1.5%	5%	31%	11.5%	2%	1.5%	18%	10.5%
Cluster17	14–16 Mar 2022	1,945	0.5%	1.5%	3.5%	14%	2%	5%	29.5%	10.5%	3%	2.5%	16%	12%
OpinionWay-Kéa	13–16 Mar 2022	1,597	<1%	1%	4%	12%	3%	6%	29%	11%	3%	2%	17%	12%
Ipsos-Sopra Steria	13–16 Mar 2022	1,651	0.5%	1.5%	4%	11%	2.5%	6.5%	31%	10.5%	2.5%	2%	16%	12%
Ifop-Fiducial	12–16 Mar 2022	1,506	0%	0.5%	4.5%	12%	2%	5.5%	30%	11%	2.5%	1%	18%	13%
OpinionWay-Kéa	12–15 Mar 2022	1,644	1%	1%	4%	11%	3%	6%	30%	11%	2%	2%	18%	11%
Ipsos-Sopra Steria	11–15 Mar 2022	1,651	0.5%	1.5%	4%	11%	2.5%	6%	30%	11%	2.5%	2.5%	15.5%	13%
Ifop-Fiducial	11–15 Mar 2022	1,506	0%	1%	4.5%	12%	2%	5%	31%	11%	2%	1%	18%	12.5%
Harris-Interactive	11–14 Mar 2022	2,390	0.5%	1%	3%	13.5%	2.5%	5%	30%	10.5%	2%	1.5%	19.5%	11%
OpinionWay-Kéa	11–14 Mar 2022	1,688	1%	1%	4%	11%	3%	6%	30%	11%	2%	2%	18%	11%
Ipsos	10–14 Mar 2022	13,749	0.5%	1.5%	4%	12%	2.5%	7%	29%	10.5%	2%	2%	16%	13%
Ipsos-Sopra Steria	10–14 Mar 2022	1,651	0.5%	1.5%	3.5%	11.5%	2.5%	6.5%	30%	11%	2%	2%	16%	13%
Ifop-Fiducial	10–14 Mar 2022	1,507	0%	1%	4.5%	11.5%	2%	5%	31%	11%	2%	1%	18%	13%
Ipsos-Sopra Steria	9–12 Mar 2022	1,653	0.5%	1.5%	3%	12%	2.5%	6.5%	30.5%	11%	1.5%	1.5%	16%	13.5%
Odoxa	9–11 Mar 2022	2,010	1%	2%	3.5%	11.5%	1.5%	4.5%	29.5%	11%	3%	2%	19.5%	11%
OpinionWay-Kéa	8–11 Mar 2022	1,639	0%	1%	3%	12%	3%	6%	30%	12%	2%	2%	17%	12%
Ifop-Fiducial	8–11 Mar 2022	1,505	0.5%	0.5%	4.5%	10.5%	2%	6%	31%	12%	2%	1%	17.5%	12.5%
OpinionWay-Kéa	7–10 Mar 2022	1,638	1%	1%	4%	11%	3%	5%	30%	12%	2%	2%	18%	11%
Ifop-Fiducial	7–10 Mar 2022	1,505	0.5%	0.5%	4%	10.5%	2%	6%	31%	12.5%	2%	1%	18%	12%
BVA	8–9 Mar 2022	977	0.5%	1%	3%	12.5%	2.5%	5.5%	30%	12%	1.5%	1.5%	17%	13%
Kantar	7–9 Mar 2022	1,394	0.5%	2%	3%	11%	1.5%	4%	31%	12%	2%	3%	17%	13%
OpinionWay-Kéa	6–9 Mar 2022	1,661	1%	1%	4%	11%	3%	5%	30%	12%	2%	2%	18%	11%
Ifop-Fiducial	5–9 Mar 2022	1,505	0%	0.5%	4%	11%	2%	5.5%	31.5%	12%	2%	1%	18.5%	12%
Elabe	7–8 Mar 2022	1,580	1%	1%	3.5%	13%	1.5%	5%	33.5%	10.5%	2.5%	2.5%	15%	11%
OpinionWay-Kéa	5–8 Mar 2022	1,677	1%	1%	5%	10%	3%	5%	30%	12%	2%	2%	18%	11%
Ifop-Fiducial	4–8 Mar 2022	1,505	0%	0.5%	4%	11.5%	2%	5.5%	30.5%	12%	1%	1.5%	18.5%	12.5%
Harris-Interactive	4–7 Mar 2022	2,394	0.5%	1%	3.5%	12.5%	2%	5%	30.5%	10.5%	2%	1.5%	18.5%	12.5%
OpinionWay-Kéa	4–7 Mar 2022	1,672	1%	1%	5%	10%	3%	5%	30%	13%	2%	1%	18%	11%
Ifop-Fiducial	3–7 Mar 2022	1,506	0%	0.5%	4%	11.5%	2.5%	5%	30%	13%	1.5%	1.5%	18%	12.5%

==== March ====
Polling firm	Fieldwork date	Sample size	Nathalie Arthaud	Philippe Poutou	Fabien Roussel	Jean-Luc Mélenchon	Christiane Taubira	Anne Hidalgo	Yannick Jadot	Hélène Thouy	Emmanuel Macron	Jean Lassalle	Valérie Pécresse	Nicolas Dupont-Aignan	Marine Le Pen	Éric Zemmour	François Asselineau
Cluster17	3–6 Mar 2022	2,056	1%	1%	3.5%	13.5%	–	1.5%	5.5%	–	28%	2%	13%	2%	14.5%	14.5%	–
OpinionWay-Kéa	1–4 Mar 2022	1,624	<1%	1%	4%	11%	2%	2%	5%	–	28%	2%	13%	2%	18%	12%	–
Ifop-Fiducial	1–4 Mar 2022	1,504	0.5%	1%	4%	11.5%	0%	3%	5%	0%	29%	1.5%	14%	1.5%	17%	12%	–
Ipsos	2–3 Mar 2022	3,599	0.5%	1%	4%	12%	–	2.5%	7.5%	–	30.5%	1.5%	11.5%	1.5%	14.5%	13%	–
OpinionWay-Kéa	28 Feb–3 Mar 2022	1,608	1%	1%	4%	10%	2%	2%	5%	–	27%	2%	14%	2%	18%	12%	–
Ifop-Fiducial	28 Feb–3 Mar 2022	1,508	0.5%	0.5%	4%	11.5%	1%	3%	4.5%	0.5%	28%	1.5%	14%	2%	17%	12%	–
BVA	1–2 Mar 2022	1,500	0.5%	0.5%	3.5%	11.5%	1.5%	2%	5.5%	<0.5%	29%	2%	13%	2%	16%	13%	<0.5%
OpinionWay-Kéa	27 Feb–2 Mar 2022	1,642	1%	1%	4%	10%	2%	3%	4%	–	26%	1%	15%	2%	19%	12%	–
Ifop-Fiducial	26 Feb–2 Mar 2022	1,505	0.5%	0.5%	4.5%	11%	1.5%	2.5%	4.5%	0.5%	28%	1.5%	13.5%	2%	17%	12.5%	–
Cluster17	27 Feb–1 Mar 2022	2,195	0.5%	0.5%	4%	13.5%	1.5%	1.5%	4.5%	–	25.5%	1%	12.5%	2%	16%	16%	1%
OpinionWay-Kéa	26 Feb–1 Mar 2022	1,651	1%	1%	4%	11%	2%	2%	4%	–	26%	1%	15%	2%	19%	12%	–
Ifop-Fiducial	25 Feb–1 Mar 2022	1,504	0.5%	0.5%	4.5%	10.5%	1.5%	2.5%	5%	0%	28%	1.5%	13%	2.5%	17%	13%	–

==== February ====
Polling firm	Fieldwork date	Sample size	Nathalie Arthaud	Philippe Poutou	Fabien Roussel	Jean-Luc Mélenchon	Christiane Taubira	Anne Hidalgo	Yannick Jadot	Hélène Thouy	Emmanuel Macron	Valérie Pécresse	Jean Lassalle	Nicolas Dupont-Aignan	Marine Le Pen	Florian Philippot	Éric Zemmour	François Asselineau
Elabe	27–28 Feb 2022	1,431	0.5%	1%	4%	12.5%	1.5%	1.5%	6.5%	0%	25%	12%	2%	2%	17%	–	14%	0.5%
Harris-Interactive	25–28 Feb 2022	2,311	0.5%	1%	3.5%	12.5%	1.5%	2%	5%	–	27%	11%	1.5%	1%	18%	–	15%	0.5%
OpinionWay-Kéa	25–28 Feb 2022	1,656	1%	1%	4%	11%	2%	2%	5%	–	24%	15%	1%	2%	19%	–	13%	–
Ifop-Fiducial	24–28 Feb 2022	1,504	0.5%	0.5%	3.5%	10.5%	1.5%	2.5%	5%	0.5%	28%	13%	2%	2.5%	16%	–	14%	–
Ipsos	24–27 Feb 2022	13,651	0.5%	1%	4%	11.5%	–	2.5%	7.5%	–	26.5%	12.5%	1.5%	2%	15.5%	–	15%	–
OpinionWay-Kéa	22–25 Feb 2022	1,598	1%	1%	4%	12%	3%	2%	5%	–	24%	14%	1%	2%	17%	–	14%	–
Ifop-Fiducial	22–25 Feb 2022	1,503	0%	0.5%	4%	11%	2%	2.5%	5%	0%	26%	14%	1.5%	1.5%	16.5%	–	15.5%	–
OpinionWay-Kéa	21–24 Feb 2022	1,603	1%	1%	5%	11%	3%	2%	5%	–	24%	14%	2%	2%	16%	–	14%	–
Ifop-Fiducial	21–24 Feb 2022	1,502	0.5%	0%	4.5%	11%	2.5%	2.5%	5%	0%	25%	14%	1%	2%	16%	–	16%	–
Kantar	21–23 Feb 2022	1,500	0.5%	1%	4%	12%	2.5%	2%	4%	–	25%	12%	1%	2.5%	16.5%	–	16.5%	0.5%
Cluster17	20–23 Feb 2022	2,615	0.5%	0.5%	4%	13.5%	2%	2%	4.5%	–	24%	13%	1%	2%	16%	–	16%	1%
OpinionWay-Kéa	20–23 Feb 2022	1,639	1%	1%	5%	11%	2%	2%	5%	–	25%	14%	2%	2%	16%	–	14%	–
Ifop-Fiducial	19–23 Feb 2022	1,502	0.5%	0.5%	4.5%	11.5%	2%	2%	5.5%	0%	25%	14.5%	0.5%	2%	15.5%	–	16%	–
Elabe	21–22 Feb 2022	1,490	1%	1%	4%	11%	2.5%	2.5%	5.5%	0.5%	24.5%	11.5%	1.5%	2.5%	18%	–	13.5%	0.5%
OpinionWay-Kéa	19–22 Feb 2022	1,633	1%	1%	4%	10%	2%	3%	5%	–	25%	14%	2%	2%	17%	–	14%	–
Ifop-Fiducial	18–22 Feb 2022	1,501	0%	0.5%	4.5%	11.5%	2%	2%	5%	0%	25%	14.5%	1%	2%	16%	–	16%	–
Harris-Interactive	18–21 Feb 2022	2,457	0.5%	0.5%	4%	12%	2.5%	2%	5%	–	24%	13.5%	2%	1%	17%	–	15.5%	0.5%
OpinionWay-Kéa	18–21 Feb 2022	1,638	1%	1%	4%	10%	2%	3%	5%	–	25%	14%	2%	2%	17%	–	14%	–
Ifop-Fiducial	17–21 Feb 2022	1,502	0%	0.5%	4%	11.5%	2%	2%	5.5%	0%	24.5%	15%	1%	1.5%	16.5%	–	16%	–
OpinionWay-Kéa	15–18 Feb 2022	1,597	1%	<1%	5%	11%	3%	3%	5%	–	24%	15%	1%	2%	15%	–	15%	–
Ifop-Fiducial	15–18 Feb 2022	1,505	0%	0%	4%	10.5%	2.5%	2%	5.5%	0%	25%	15%	1%	2%	16%	–	16.5%	–
OpinionWay-Kéa	14–17 Feb 2022	1,578	1%	<1%	5%	11%	3%	3%	5%	–	24%	15%	1%	2%	15%	–	15%	–
Ifop-Fiducial	14–17 Feb 2022	1,505	0%	0%	3.5%	11%	2.5%	2%	5%	0%	26%	15%	1%	1.5%	16.5%	–	16%	–
BVA	15–16 Feb 2022	893	0.5%	1%	4.5%	10.5%	4%	2%	4.5%	<0.5%	24%	13.5%	1%	2%	17.5%	–	14.5%	0.5%
Odoxa	15–16 Feb 2022	2,010	0.5%	1.5%	4.5%	11%	3%	2%	5%	–	24.5%	12%	2%	2%	18%	–	14%	–
Elabe	14–16 Feb 2022	1,449	0.5%	1%	4.5%	10.5%	4.5%	1.5%	5.5%	1%	24%	14%	1.5%	2%	15%	0%	13.5%	1%
OpinionWay-Kéa	13–16 Feb 2022	1,604	<1%	<1%	5%	10%	3%	3%	5%	–	25%	16%	1%	2%	15%	–	15%	–
Ifop-Fiducial	12–16 Feb 2022	1,504	0%	0.5%	3%	11%	2.5%	2.5%	5%	0%	26%	15%	1%	1.5%	16.5%	–	15.5%	–
OpinionWay-Kéa	12–15 Feb 2022	1,746	<1%	<1%	5%	10%	3%	3%	5%	–	25%	16%	2%	2%	15%	–	14%	–
Ifop-Fiducial	11–15 Feb 2022	1,503	0.5%	1%	3%	11.5%	3%	2%	4.5%	0%	25.5%	14.5%	1%	1.5%	17.5%	–	15%	–
Harris-Interactive	11–14 Feb 2022	2,476	0.5%	0.5%	3.5%	10.5%	3.5%	2.5%	5.5%	–	25%	14%	1%	1%	17.5%	–	14.5%	0.5%
OpinionWay-Kéa	11–14 Feb 2022	1,646	<1%	1%	5%	10%	3%	3%	4%	–	24%	16%	2%	2%	16%	–	14%	–
Ifop-Fiducial	10–14 Feb 2022	1,503	0.5%	1%	3%	11%	3%	2.5%	4.5%	0%	25.5%	15%	0.5%	1.5%	17%	–	15%	–
OpinionWay-Kéa	8–11 Feb 2022	1,615	<1%	1%	5%	9%	3%	3%	5%	–	24%	16%	2%	1%	17%	–	14%	–
Ifop-Fiducial	8–11 Feb 2022	1,503	0.5%	0.5%	3%	10.5%	2.5%	2.5%	5%	0.5%	25.5%	15%	0.5%	2%	17%	–	15%	–
Cluster17	8–11 Feb 2022	2,085	0.5%	0.5%	4%	13%	2.5%	2%	5%	–	23%	15%	0.5%	1%	16.5%	1%	15%	0.5%
OpinionWay-Kéa	7–10 Feb 2022	1,648	<1%	1%	4%	9%	4%	3%	4%	–	23%	16%	2%	2%	17%	–	15%	–
Ifop-Fiducial	7–10 Feb 2022	1,502	0.5%	0.5%	3%	10.5%	3%	2%	5%	0%	25.5%	15%	1%	2%	17.5%	–	14.5%	–
BVA	7–9 Feb 2022	1,505	0.5%	1.5%	4%	9%	4%	2%	4.5%	<0.5%	25%	14.5%	1.5%	2%	17%	–	14%	0.5%
OpinionWay-Kéa	6–9 Feb 2022	1,669	<1%	1%	4%	9%	4%	3%	4%	–	23%	16%	2%	2%	17%	–	15%	–
Ifop-Fiducial	5–9 Feb 2022	1,504	0%	0.5%	3.5%	10.5%	3.5%	2.5%	4.5%	0%	25.5%	15%	1%	1.5%	17.5%	–	14.5%	–
Elabe	7–8 Feb 2022	1,488	0.5%	1%	4%	10%	3.5%	1.5%	4.5%	0%	26%	15%	2%	1.5%	15.5%	1.5%	13%	0.5%
OpinionWay-Kéa	5–8 Feb 2022	1,658	<1%	1%	4%	9%	4%	3%	4%	–	24%	17%	1%	2%	17%	–	14%	–
Ifop-Fiducial	4–8 Feb 2022	1,504	0%	0.5%	3.5%	10%	4%	2.5%	4.5%	0%	25%	15.5%	1%	1.5%	17%	–	15%	–
Harris-Interactive	4–7 Feb 2022	2,421	<0.5%	<0.5%	3%	10%	5%	3%	6%	–	24%	15%	1%	1%	17%	–	14.5%	0.5%
OpinionWay-Kéa	4–7 Feb 2022	1,630	<1%	1%	4%	9%	4%	3%	4%	–	24%	17%	1%	2%	17%	–	14%	–
Ifop-Fiducial	3–7 Feb 2022	1,504	0%	0.5%	3.5%	10%	4.5%	2.5%	4.5%	0%	25%	15.5%	1%	1%	17.5%	–	14.5%	–
Ipsos-Sopra Steria	3–7 Feb 2022	12,499	0.5%	1%	3.5%	9%	5%	2.5%	7%	–	24%	15.5%	1%	1.5%	15%	–	14.5%	–
Cluster17	1–5 Feb 2022	2,204	0.5%	1%	3.5%	13%	3%	1.5%	5%	–	23%	13.5%	1.5%	1.5%	15.5%	1.5%	15.5%	0.5%
Ifop	3–4 Feb 2022	1,391	<0.5%	0.5%	3.5%	9.5%	4%	3%	5%	<0.5%	25%	16%	1%	1.5%	17%	–	14%	–
OpinionWay-Kéa	1–4 Feb 2022	1,609	<1%	1%	4%	10%	4%	3%	4%	–	24%	16%	1%	2%	17%	–	14%	–
Ifop-Fiducial	1–4 Feb 2022	1,503	0%	0.5%	3%	10%	4.5%	2.5%	4.5%	0%	25.5%	15%	1%	2%	18%	–	13.5%	–
Ipsos	1–3 Feb 2022	1,535	0.5%	1%	3%	9%	4%	3%	8%	–	24%	16.5%	1%	2%	14%	–	14%	–
OpinionWay-Kéa	31 Jan–3 Feb 2022	1,609	<1%	1%	4%	10%	4%	3%	5%	–	24%	16%	1%	2%	17%	–	14%	–
Ifop-Fiducial	31 Jan–3 Feb 2022	1,504	0%	0.5%	3%	10%	4.5%	3%	4.5%	0%	25%	15.5%	0.5%	1.5%	18%	–	14%	–
Elabe	31 Jan–2 Feb 2022	1,482	0%	0.5%	2.5%	9.5%	6%	2%	4.5%	0.5%	25%	16%	1%	2.5%	16.5%	0.5%	12.5%	0.5%
OpinionWay-Kéa	30 Jan–2 Feb 2022	1,639	<1%	<1%	3%	10%	5%	3%	5%	–	24%	16%	1%	2%	17%	–	14%	–
Ifop-Fiducial	29 Jan–2 Feb 2022	1,503	0%	0.5%	3%	10%	4.5%	3%	5%	0%	24.5%	16%	0.5%	1.5%	18%	–	13.5%	–
OpinionWay-Kéa	29 Jan–1 Feb 2022	1,666	<1%	<1%	3%	10%	5%	3%	5%	–	24%	16%	1%	2%	17%	–	14%	–
Ifop-Fiducial	29 Jan–1 Feb 2022	1,504	0%	0.5%	3.5%	9.5%	4%	3.5%	5%	0%	24%	16%	1%	1.5%	17.5%	–	14%	–

==== January ====
Polling firm	Fieldwork date	Sample size	Nathalie Arthaud	Philippe Poutou	Fabien Roussel	Jean-Luc Mélenchon	Christiane Taubira	Arnaud Montebourg	Anne Hidalgo	Hélène Thouy	Yannick Jadot	Emmanuel Macron	Valérie Pécresse	Jean Lassalle	Nicolas Dupont-Aignan	Marine Le Pen	Florian Philippot	Éric Zemmour	François Asselineau
Harris-Interactive	28–31 Jan 2022	2,562	<0.5%	1%	2%	11%	5%	–	2%	–	6%	24%	15%	1%	2%	17%	0.5%	14%	<0.5%
OpinionWay-Kéa	28–31 Jan 2022	1,655	<1%	<1%	3%	10%	5%	–	3%	–	5%	24%	17%	1%	2%	17%	–	13%	–
Ifop-Fiducial	27–31 Jan 2022	1,503	0%	0.5%	3.5%	9.5%	4%	–	3.5%	0%	5%	24%	16.5%	1%	1.5%	17.5%	–	13.5%	–
Cluster17	25–29 Jan 2022	1,197	0%	1%	2%	13%	6%	–	2%	–	5%	22.5%	14%	1%	1.5%	14.5%	1.5%	14.5%	1%
OpinionWay	25–28 Jan 2022	1,568	<1%	1%	3%	9%	5%	–	3%	–	5%	24%	17%	1%	2%	17%	–	13%	–
Ifop-Fiducial	25–28 Jan 2022	1,503	0%	0.5%	3%	9.5%	4%	–	3.5%	0%	5.5%	24%	16.5%	1%	1%	18%	–	13.5%	–
OpinionWay	24–27 Jan 2022	1,567	<1%	1%	3%	9%	5%	–	3%	–	5%	24%	17%	1%	2%	17%	–	13%	–
Ifop-Fiducial	24–27 Jan 2022	1,504	0%	0.5%	3%	9%	3.5%	–	3%	0.5%	5.5%	24.5%	16%	1%	1.5%	18.5%	–	13.5%	–
BVA	24–26 Jan 2022	1,503	<0.5%	0.5%	3%	10%	4%	–	3%	–	6%	24%	16%	0.5%	2%	18%	–	12.5%	0.5%
Elabe	24–26 Jan 2022	1,508	0%	1%	2.5%	9%	5%	–	2.5%	0.5%	5.5%	24%	17%	2%	2%	16.5%	0.5%	11.5%	0.5%
Elabe	24–26 Jan 2022	1,508	0.5%	1.5%	3%	10%	–	–	3%	0.5%	6.5%	25%	17%	2%	1.5%	17%	0.5%	11.5%	0.5%
OpinionWay	23–26 Jan 2022	1,629	<1%	1%	3%	9%	5%	–	3%	–	5%	25%	17%	1%	1%	16%	–	14%	–
Ifop-Fiducial	22–26 Jan 2022	1,505	0.5%	0.5%	3%	9%	3.5%	–	3%	0%	5.5%	24.5%	16%	1%	2%	18.5%	–	13%	–
OpinionWay	22–25 Jan 2022	1,634	<1%	1%	3%	9%	5%	–	3%	–	5%	25%	17%	1%	1%	16%	–	14%	–
Ifop-Fiducial	21–25 Jan 2022	1,504	0.5%	0.5%	3%	10%	3%	–	3.5%	0%	5%	24.5%	16.5%	0.5%	2%	18.5%	–	12.5%	–
Harris-Interactive	21–24 Jan 2022	2,496	<0.5%	1%	2%	10%	5%	–	3%	–	5%	24%	15%	1%	2%	17%	1%	14%	<0.5%
Harris-Interactive	21–24 Jan 2022	2,496	<0.5%	1%	2%	11%	–	–	4%	–	7%	25%	15%	1%	2%	17%	1%	14%	<0.5%
OpinionWay	21–24 Jan 2022	1,650	<1%	1%	3%	9%	5%	–	3%	–	5%	25%	18%	1%	1%	16%	–	13%	–
Ifop-Fiducial	20–24 Jan 2022	1,507	0.5%	0.5%	3%	10.5%	3%	–	3.5%	0%	5%	24.5%	16.5%	1%	2%	18%	–	12%	–
Cluster17	18–22 Jan 2022	2,548	0%	1%	2%	13%	6%	0.5%	2%	–	5%	22%	14%	1.5%	1.5%	15%	1.5%	14%	1%
OpinionWay	18–21 Jan 2022	1,613	<1%	1%	2%	9%	6%	<1%	2%	–	5%	25%	18%	1%	1%	17%	–	13%	–
Ifop-Fiducial	18–21 Jan 2022	1,507	0.5%	0.5%	2.5%	10%	3%	–	3%	0.5%	6%	25.5%	16.5%	1%	1.5%	17.5%	–	12%	–
OpinionWay	17–20 Jan 2022	1,603	<1%	1%	2%	9%	6%	<1%	3%	–	5%	24%	18%	1%	1%	17%	–	13%	–
Ifop-Fiducial	17–20 Jan 2022	1,505	0.5%	1%	2%	10.5%	3%	–	3%	0.5%	5.5%	25.5%	16%	1%	1.5%	18%	–	12%	–
OpinionWay	16–19 Jan 2022	1,626	<1%	1%	3%	9%	5%	1%	3%	–	5%	24%	17%	2%	1%	17%	–	12%	–
Ifop-Fiducial	15–19 Jan 2022	1,504	0.5%	1%	2%	10%	3.5%	0.5%	3%	0.5%	5.5%	25%	16%	1.5%	1.5%	18%	–	11.5%	–
OpinionWay	15–18 Jan 2022	1,624	<1%	1%	3%	9%	5%	1%	3%	–	5%	24%	17%	2%	1%	17%	–	12%	–
Ifop-Fiducial	14–18 Jan 2022	1,514	0.5%	1%	2%	10%	4%	0.5%	3%	0.5%	5.5%	24.5%	16.5%	1.5%	2%	17%	–	11.5%	–
OpinionWay	15–17 Jan 2022	1,093	<1%	1%	3%	10%	4%	1%	3%	–	5%	24%	18%	1%	1%	18%	–	11%	–
Ipsos	14–17 Jan 2022	12,542	0.5%	1.5%	2.5%	8%	5%	–	3.5%	–	7%	25%	15.5%	1%	2%	15.5%	–	13%	–
Ipsos	14–17 Jan 2022	12,542	0.5%	1.5%	2.5%	8.5%	–	1.5%	4.5%	–	8.5%	25.5%	15.5%	1%	2%	15.5%	–	13%	–
Harris-Interactive	14–17 Jan 2022	2,599	<0.5%	<0.5%	2%	10%	4%	1%	3%	–	6%	25%	16%	<0.5%	1%	17%	1%	14%	<0.5%
Harris-Interactive	14–17 Jan 2022	2,599	<0.5%	1%	2%	11%	–	1%	3%	–	7%	26%	16%	<0.5%	1%	17%	1%	14%	<0.5%
Ifop-Fiducial	13–17 Jan 2022	1,517	0.5%	1%	2%	9%	4%	1%	3%	0.5%	5.5%	24.5%	16.5%	1.5%	1.5%	17%	–	12.5%	–
Cluster17	11–15 Jan 2022	2,558	0.5%	1.5%	2%	12.5%	5.5%	1%	2%	–	4.5%	22.5%	13%	1%	2.5%	14.5%	1.5%	14%	1.5%
OpinionWay	11–14 Jan 2022	1,577	<1%	1%	3%	10%	–	1%	4%	–	6%	24%	18%	1%	2%	18%	–	12%	–
Ifop-Fiducial	11–14 Jan 2022	1,511	0.5%	0.5%	2%	8.5%	4.5%	0.5%	3.5%	0%	6%	25%	16.5%	1%	1.5%	16%	–	14%	–
Ifop-Fiducial	11–14 Jan 2022	1,511	0.5%	0.5%	2.5%	9%	–	1%	3.5%	0%	7%	26%	17%	1%	1.5%	17%	–	13.5%	–
OpinionWay	10–13 Jan 2022	1,575	<1%	1%	2%	9%	–	1%	4%	–	7%	25%	17%	1%	2%	18%	–	13%	–
Ifop-Fiducial	10–13 Jan 2022	1,509	0.5%	0%	2%	9%	4%	0.5%	3.5%	0%	6%	25%	17%	1%	1.5%	16%	–	14%	–
Ifop-Fiducial	10–13 Jan 2022	1,509	0.5%	0.5%	2%	9.5%	–	0.5%	3.5%	0.5%	6.5%	26.5%	17%	1%	2%	16.5%	–	13.5%	–
OpinionWay	9–12 Jan 2022	1,604	1%	1%	2%	9%	–	1%	4%	–	7%	25%	16%	2%	2%	18%	–	12%	–
Ifop-Fiducial	8–12 Jan 2022	1,505	0.5%	0%	2%	9%	4%	0.5%	3.5%	0%	5.5%	25.5%	16%	1%	2%	16.5%	–	14%	–
Ifop-Fiducial	8–12 Jan 2022	1,505	0.5%	0.5%	2%	9.5%	–	0.5%	3.5%	0.5%	6.5%	27%	16.5%	1%	2%	16.5%	–	13.5%	–
Elabe	10–11 Jan 2022	1,465	0.5%	1%	1.5%	10%	4%	1%	2.5%	0.5%	6%	22.5%	16%	2%	2%	16.5%	1%	12.5%	0.5%
Elabe	10–11 Jan 2022	1,465	1%	1.5%	1.5%	9.5%	–	1%	3.5%	0.5%	7%	23%	17%	2%	1.5%	17%	1%	13%	0%
OpinionWay	8–11 Jan 2022	1,613	1%	1%	2%	9%	–	1%	4%	–	8%	25%	16%	2%	2%	17%	–	12%	–
Ifop-Fiducial	7–11 Jan 2022	1,504	0.5%	1%	2%	8.5%	3.5%	0.5%	3%	0.5%	6%	26%	16%	1%	2%	17%	–	12.5%	–
Ifop-Fiducial	7–11 Jan 2022	1,504	0.5%	1%	2%	9%	–	0.5%	4%	0.5%	6.5%	27%	16.5%	1%	2%	17%	–	12.5%	–
Harris-Interactive	7–10 Jan 2022	2,600	<0.5%	1%	2%	11%	–	1%	4%	–	7%	25%	16%	<0.5%	2%	16%	<0.5%	15%	<0.5%
OpinionWay	7–10 Jan 2022	1,644	1%	1%	2%	9%	–	1%	4%	–	8%	25%	16%	2%	2%	17%	–	12%	–
Ifop-Fiducial	6–10 Jan 2022	1,502	0.5%	1%	2%	8.5%	3.5%	0.5%	3.5%	0.5%	5.5%	26%	16%	1%	2%	17%	–	12.5%	–
Ifop-Fiducial	6–10 Jan 2022	1,502	0.5%	1%	2.5%	9.5%	–	0.5%	4%	0.5%	6%	27%	15.5%	1%	2%	17.5%	–	12.5%	–
Cluster17	4–8 Jan 2022	2,291	0.5%	1.5%	2%	12.5%	5.5%	0.5%	2%	–	4.5%	23%	14%	1%	2%	15%	1.5%	13.5%	1%
OpinionWay	4–7 Jan 2022	1,561	1%	1%	3%	9%	–	1%	4%	–	7%	25%	17%	1%	2%	17%	–	12%	–
Ipsos	5–6 Jan 2022	1,500	1%	1%	2%	9%	3%	1%	3%	–	7%	25.5%	16%	1%	1.5%	17%	–	12%	–
Ipsos	5–6 Jan 2022	1,500	1%	1%	2%	9%	–	1%	4.5%	–	8%	26%	16%	1%	1.5%	17%	–	12%	–
BVA	5–6 Jan 2022	1,510	0.5%	1%	1.5%	10%	–	1.5%	3.5%	–	8%	25%	16%	1.5%	2%	17%	–	12%	0.5%
OpinionWay	3–6 Jan 2022	1,534	1%	1%	3%	9%	–	1%	4%	–	7%	25%	17%	1%	2%	17%	–	12%	–
Ifop-Fiducial	3–5 Jan 2022	1,332	0.5%	1%	2.5%	8.5%	5%	–	–	–	6.5%	26.5%	16.5%	1%	2.5%	16.5%	–	13%	–
Ifop-Fiducial	3–5 Jan 2022	1,332	0.5%	1%	2.5%	8.5%	2.5%	1%	3%	–	6.5%	25.5%	16%	1%	2.5%	16.5%	–	13%	–
Ifop-Fiducial	3–5 Jan 2022	1,332	0.5%	1%	2.5%	8.5%	–	1%	3.5%	–	7%	27%	16%	1%	2.5%	16%	–	13.5%	–
OpinionWay	2–5 Jan 2022	1,501	1%	1%	3%	9%	–	1%	4%	–	7%	25%	17%	1%	2%	16%	–	13%	–
OpinionWay	2–4 Jan 2022	1,568	1%	1%	3%	9%	–	1%	4%	–	7%	25%	17%	1%	2%	16%	–	13%	–
OpinionWay	2–3 Jan 2022	1,059	1%	1%	3%	9%	–	1%	4%	–	7%	26%	16%	1%	2%	16%	–	13%	–

=== 2021 ===
==== December ====
Polling firm	Fieldwork date	Sample size	Nathalie Arthaud	Philippe Poutou	Fabien Roussel	Jean-Luc Mélenchon	Christiane Taubira	Arnaud Montebourg	Anne Hidalgo	Hélène Thouy	Yannick Jadot	Emmanuel Macron	Valérie Pécresse	Jean Lassalle	Nicolas Dupont-Aignan	Marine Le Pen	Florian Philippot	Éric Zemmour	François Asselineau
Harris-Interactive	28–31 Dec 2021	2,550	<0.5%	1%	4%	12%	–	–	7%	–	–	26%	16%	<0.5%	2%	16%	<0.5%	16%	<0.5%
Harris-Interactive	28–31 Dec 2021	2,550	1%	1%	3%	11%	8%	–	–	–	–	25%	17%	<0.5%	2%	16%	<0.5%	16%	<0.5%
Harris-Interactive	28–31 Dec 2021	2,550	1%	1%	3%	10%	–	–	–	–	9%	25%	17%	<0.5%	2%	16%	<0.5%	16%	<0.5%
Harris-Interactive	28–31 Dec 2021	2,550	<0.5%	1%	3%	10%	–	1%	4%	–	7%	24%	16%	<0.5%	2%	16%	<0.5%	16%	<0.5%
Cluster17	27–31 Dec 2021	2,252	0.5%	1%	1.5%	13%	4.5%	1.5%	2%	–	4%	23%	15%	1%	1.5%	14.5%	1%	15%	1%
OpinionWay	21–22 Dec 2021	1,048	<1%	1%	2%	8%	3%	1%	4%	–	6%	26%	18%	1%	2%	16%	–	12%	–
Cluster17	19–22 Dec 2021	1,466	0.5%	1.5%	1.5%	12%	7%	1.5%	2%	–	5%	20%	16%	1%	2%	13%	1%	14%	1%
Elabe	17–20 Dec 2021	1,455	1%	1%	1%	11%	–	2%	3%	<1%	5%	26%	17%	1%	2%	16%	1%	13%	<1%
Ifop-Fiducial	14–15 Dec 2021	1,122	<0.5%	0.5%	3%	9.5%	–	1%	4.5%	–	7.5%	25.5%	18%	0.5%	2%	16%	–	12%	–
OpinionWay	13–15 Dec 2021	1,470	1%	1%	3%	9%	–	2%	4%	–	8%	24%	17%	1%	2%	16%	–	12%	–
Cluster17	12–15 Dec 2021	1,520	0.5%	1%	2%	13%	–	1%	3%	–	5%	22%	18%	1%	1.5%	15%	1%	15%	1%
Harris-Interactive	10–13 Dec 2021	2,613	<0.5%	1%	2%	11%	–	1%	4%	–	7%	24%	17%	<0.5%	2%	16%	<0.5%	15%	<0.5%
Ipsos	7–13 Dec 2021	10,928	0.5%	1.5%	2%	8.5%	–	1.5%	4.5%	–	8.5%	24%	17%	1%	2%	14.5%	–	14.5%	–
OpinionWay	8–9 Dec 2021	962	<1%	2%	2%	8%	2%	1%	5%	–	8%	25%	17%	–	2%	16%	–	12%	–
Odoxa	7–9 Dec 2021	2,010	1%	1.5%	2%	10%	–	1%	3%	–	6%	24%	19%	1%	2.5%	17%	–	12%	–
BVA	6–8 Dec 2021	1,655	0.5%	1.5%	2.5%	9%	–	1%	5%	–	7%	24%	17%	1%	2.5%	16%	–	13%	<0.5%
Ipsos	6–8 Dec 2021	1,500	0.5%	1.5%	2%	8%	–	2.5%	5%	–	7%	25%	16%	1%	1.5%	16%	–	14%	–
Cluster17	4–8 Dec 2021	1,612	0.5%	1%	2%	13%	–	1%	3%	–	5%	23%	16%	1%	2%	16%	1%	15%	0.5%
Elabe	6–7 Dec 2021	1,474	1%	2%	1%	8%	–	2%	3%	<1%	7%	23%	20%	2%	2%	15%	<1%	14%	<1%
Ifop-Fiducial	4–6 Dec 2021	1,341	0.5%	0.5%	2.5%	9%	–	1.5%	5%	–	6%	25%	17%	0.5%	2.5%	17%	–	13%	–
Harris-Interactive	3–6 Dec 2021	2,613	1%	1%	2%	11%	–	1%	5%	–	7%	23%	14%	<0.5%	2%	18%	1%	14%	<0.5%

==== September–November ====
Polling firm	Fieldwork date	Sample size	Nathalie Arthaud	Philippe Poutou	Fabien Roussel	Jean-Luc Mélenchon	Arnaud Montebourg	Anne Hidalgo	Yannick Jadot	Emmanuel Macron	Jean-Christophe Lagarde	Michel Barnier	Xavier Bertrand	Éric Ciotti	Philippe Juvin	Denis Payre	Valérie Pécresse	Jean-Frédéric Poisson	Jean Lassalle	Nicolas Dupont-Aignan	Marine Le Pen	Florian Philippot	Éric Zemmour	François Asselineau
Harris-Interactive	26–29 Nov 2021	2,601	1%	1%	2%	10%	2%	5%	7%	23%	–	–	14%	–	–	–	–	–	<0.5%	2%	19%	1%	13%	<0.5%
Harris-Interactive	26–29 Nov 2021	2,601	1%	1%	2%	10%	2%	5%	8%	24%	–	–	–	–	–	–	11%	–	<0.5%	2%	20%	1%	13%	<0.5%
Harris-Interactive	26–29 Nov 2021	2,601	1%	1%	2%	10%	2%	5%	8%	24%	–	10%	–	–	–	–	–	–	<0.5%	2%	20%	2%	13%	<0.5%
Ifop-Fiducial	23–25 Nov 2021	1,351	0%	1%	2%	7.5%	2%	6%	7%	25%	–	–	13%	–	–	–	–	–	0.5%	3%	19%	–	14%	–
Ifop-Fiducial	23–25 Nov 2021	1,351	0.5%	1%	2%	8.5%	2%	6%	6.5%	25%	–	–	–	–	–	–	10%	–	0%	4%	19.5%	–	15%	–
Ifop-Fiducial	23–25 Nov 2021	1,351	0.5%	1%	2.5%	8.5%	2%	6%	6.5%	25%	–	10%	–	–	–	–	–	–	0.5%	3.5%	19%	–	15%	–
Ifop-Fiducial	23–25 Nov 2021	1,351	0.5%	1%	2%	8.5%	2.5%	6%	7%	28%	–	–	–	6%	–	–	–	–	1%	3.5%	20%	–	14%	–
Ifop-Fiducial	23–25 Nov 2021	1,351	0.5%	1%	2.5%	8%	2.5%	6.5%	7.5%	28%	–	–	–	–	3%	–	–	–	1.5%	4%	20%	–	15%	–
Elabe	23–24 Nov 2021	1,491	1%	1%	2%	9%	1%	4%	8%	25%	–	–	13%	–	–	–	–	<1%	1%	2%	20%	1%	12%	<1%
Elabe	23–24 Nov 2021	1,491	1%	2%	2%	9%	2%	4%	8%	25%	–	–	–	–	–	–	9%	<1%	1%	3%	20%	<1%	13%	1%
Elabe	23–24 Nov 2021	1,491	1%	1%	2%	9%	2%	4%	8%	25%	–	9%	–	–	–	–	–	<1%	1%	3%	20%	1%	13%	1%
Elabe	23–24 Nov 2021	1,491	1%	1%	2%	9%	3%	5%	8%	26%	–	–	–	5%	–	–	–	<1%	1%	3%	21%	1%	13%	1%
Elabe	23–24 Nov 2021	1,491	<1%	1%	2%	9%	2%	4%	9%	27%	–	–	–	–	3%	–	–	<1%	1%	3%	22%	1%	15%	1%
Harris-Interactive	19–22 Nov 2021	2,624	1%	1%	2%	10%	1%	5%	8%	23%	–	–	14%	–	–	–	–	–	<0.5%	2%	16%	1%	16%	<0.5%
Harris-Interactive	19–22 Nov 2021	2,624	1%	1%	2%	10%	1%	5%	9%	24%	–	–	–	–	–	–	11%	–	<0.5%	2%	16%	2%	16%	<0.5%
Harris-Interactive	19–22 Nov 2021	2,624	1%	1%	2%	10%	1%	5%	9%	24%	–	10%	–	–	–	–	–	–	<0.5%	2%	16%	2%	17%	<0.5%
Harris-Interactive	19–22 Nov 2021	2,624	1%	1%	2%	10%	1%	5%	9%	29%	–	–	–	5%	–	–	–	–	<0.5%	2%	17%	1%	17%	<0.5%
Harris-Interactive	19–22 Nov 2021	2,624	1%	1%	2%	10%	1%	5%	9%	30%	–	–	–	–	4%	–	–	–	<0.5%	2%	17%	1%	17%	<0.5%
OpinionWay	15–17 Nov 2021	1,521	1%	1%	2%	9%	3%	5%	8%	24%	–	–	13%	–	–	–	–	–	–	3%	19%	–	12%	–
OpinionWay	15–17 Nov 2021	1,521	1%	1%	2%	9%	3%	5%	8%	24%	–	–	–	–	–	–	11%	–	–	3%	20%	–	12%	–
OpinionWay	15–17 Nov 2021	1,521	1%	1%	2%	9%	3%	6%	8%	25%	–	9%	–	–	–	–	–	–	–	3%	21%	–	12%	–
Harris-Interactive	12–15 Nov 2021	2,609	1%	1%	2%	10%	2%	4%	8%	23%	–	–	14%	–	–	–	–	–	<0.5%	1%	16%	1%	17%	<0.5%
Harris-Interactive	12–15 Nov 2021	2,609	1%	1%	2%	10%	2%	4%	9%	24%	–	–	–	–	–	–	10%	–	<0.5%	2%	16%	2%	17%	<0.5%
Harris-Interactive	12–15 Nov 2021	2,609	1%	1%	2%	10%	2%	4%	9%	24%	–	10%	–	–	–	–	–	–	<0.5%	2%	16%	1%	18%	<0.5%
Elabe	10–11 Nov 2021	1,484	1%	2%	2%	8%	2%	7%	5%	25%	–	–	13%	–	–	–	–	<0.5%	1%	2%	17%	0.5%	14%	0.5%
Elabe	10–11 Nov 2021	1,484	1%	2%	2%	8%	2%	7%	5%	27%	–	–	–	–	–	–	11%	<0.5%	0.5%	2%	18%	0.5%	14%	<0.5%
Elabe	10–11 Nov 2021	1,484	1%	2%	2%	8%	2%	8%	5%	28%	–	9%	–	–	–	–	–	<0.5%	1%	2%	18%	0.5%	13%	0.5%
Elabe	10–11 Nov 2021	1,484	1%	2%	2%	8%	2%	8%	5%	30%	–	–	–	5%	–	–	–	<0.5%	1%	2%	17%	1%	15%	1%
Elabe	10–11 Nov 2021	1,484	1%	1%	2%	9%	2%	8%	6%	29%	–	–	–	–	4%	–	–	<0.5%	1%	2%	18%	1%	15%	1%
Odoxa	5–8 Nov 2021	3,005	1%	2%	2%	8.5%	2%	4.5%	6.5%	25%	–	–	12%	–	–	–	–	–	1,5%	3%	18%	–	14%	–
Odoxa	5–8 Nov 2021	3,005	1%	2.5%	2%	8.5%	2%	5%	6.5%	25%	–	–	–	–	–	–	9%	–	1.5%	4%	18.5%	–	14.5%	–
Odoxa	5–8 Nov 2021	3,005	1%	2%	2%	9%	2%	5%	7%	25%	–	9%	–	–	–	–	–	–	1%	3%	19%	–	14.5%	–
Harris-Interactive	5–8 Nov 2021	2,569	1%	1%	2%	10%	2%	4%	8%	23%	<0.5%	–	14%	–	–	–	–	–	<0.5%	1%	15%	1%	18%	<0.5%
Harris-Interactive	5–8 Nov 2021	2,569	1%	1%	2%	10%	2%	4%	9%	24%	<0.5%	–	–	–	–	–	10%	–	<0.5%	2%	16%	1%	18%	<0.5%
Harris-Interactive	5–8 Nov 2021	2,569	1%	1%	2%	10%	2%	4%	9%	24%	<0.5%	10%	–	–	–	–	–	–	<0.5%	2%	15%	1%	19%	<0.5%
Ifop-Fiducial	4–5 Nov 2021	1,358	0.5%	0.5%	2%	8.5%	2.5%	5%	7%	25%	–	–	13%	–	–	–	–	–	0.5%	2.5%	16%	–	17%	–
Ifop-Fiducial	4–5 Nov 2021	1,358	0.5%	1%	2.5%	8%	4%	6%	7%	25%	–	10%	–	–	–	–	–	–	0.5%	4%	17%	–	16.5%	–
Ifop-Fiducial	4–5 Nov 2021	1,358	0,5%	1%	2%	8%	4%	6%	7%	26%	–	–	–	–	–	–	9%	–	1%	4.5%	16.5%	–	16.5%	–
Ifop-Fiducial	4–5 Nov 2021	1,358	0.5%	1%	2%	8.5%	4.5%	6.5%	7%	29%	–	–	–	4%	–	–	–	–	1%	4%	17%	–	18%	–
Ifop-Fiducial	4–5 Nov 2021	1,358	0.5%	1%	2%	9%	4.5%	6%	7%	28%	–	–	–	–	2%	–	–	–	1%	4%	18%	–	18%	<0.5%
Harris-Interactive	28–30 Oct 2021	2,505	1%	1%	2%	10%	2%	5%	8%	23%	<0.5%	–	14%	–	–	–	–	–	<0.5%	1%	15%	1%	17%	<0.5%
Harris-Interactive	28–30 Oct 2021	2,505	1%	1%	2%	10%	2%	5%	9%	24%	<0.5%	–	–	–	–	–	10%	–	<0.5%	2%	16%	1%	17%	<0.5%
Harris-Interactive	28–30 Oct 2021	2,505	1%	1%	2%	10%	2%	5%	9%	24%	<0.5%	9%	–	–	–	–	–	–	<0.5%	2%	16%	1%	18%	<0.5%
Elabe	25–27 Oct 2021	1,300	1%	1%	2%	7%	4%	5%	6%	23%	<1%	–	13%	–	–	–	–	<1%	1%	4%	19%	1%	15%	<1%
Elabe	25–27 Oct 2021	1,300	1%	1%	2%	6%	4%	5%	8%	24%	<1%	–	–	–	–	–	10%	<1%	2%	2%	19%	<1%	16%	<1%
Elabe	25–27 Oct 2021	1,300	<1%	1%	2%	7%	4%	5%	7%	26%	1%	8%	–	–	–	–	–	1%	2%	4%	19%	<1%	15%	<1%
Harris-Interactive	22–25 Oct 2021	2,497	1%	1%	2%	10%	2%	5%	8%	23%	<0.5%	–	14%	–	–	–	–	–	<0.5%	1%	16%	<0.5%	17%	<0.5%
Harris-Interactive	22–25 Oct 2021	2,497	1%	1%	2%	10%	2%	5%	9%	25%	<0.5%	–	–	–	–	–	10%	–	<0.5%	2%	16%	<0.5%	17%	<0.5%
Harris-Interactive	22–25 Oct 2021	2,497	1%	1%	2%	10%	2%	6%	9%	25%	<0.5%	8%	–	–	–	–	–	–	<0.5%	2%	16%	<0.5%	18%	<0.5%
OpinionWay	18–20 Oct 2021	1,066	1%	1%	2%	9%	4%	5%	8%	25%	–	–	12%	–	–	–	–	–	–	4%	18%	–	13%	–
OpinionWay	18–20 Oct 2021	1,066	1%	1%	2%	9%	4%	5%	8%	25%	–	–	–	–	–	–	8%	–	–	4%	19%	–	13%	–
OpinionWay	18–20 Oct 2021	1,066	1%	1%	2%	9%	4%	6%	8%	26%	–	8%	–	–	–	–	–	–	–	4%	20%	–	13%	–
OpinionWay	18–20 Oct 2021	1,066	1%	1%	2%	8%	4%	6%	8%	26%	–	–	13%	–	–	–	–	–	–	6%	26%	–	–	–
Harris-Interactive	15–18 Oct 2021	2,544	1%	1%	2%	10%	4%	4%	8%	23%	<0.5%	–	14%	–	–	–	–	–	<0.5%	1%	16%	<0.5%	17%	<0.5%
Harris-Interactive	15–18 Oct 2021	2,544	1%	1%	2%	10%	4%	4%	9%	25%	<0.5%	–	–	–	–	–	10%	–	<0.5%	2%	16%	<0.5%	17%	<0.5%
Harris-Interactive	15–18 Oct 2021	2,544	1%	1%	2%	10%	4%	5%	9%	25%	<0.5%	8%	–	–	–	–	–	–	<0.5%	2%	16%	<0.5%	18%	<0.5%
Ifop-Fiducial	14–15 Oct 2021	1,516	0.5%	0.5%	2%	8%	1.5%	6%	7%	24%	–	–	15%	–	–	–	–	–	0.5%	2%	17%	–	16%	–
Ifop-Fiducial	14–15 Oct 2021	1,516	0.5%	1%	2.5%	8.5%	2%	6.5%	7%	24%	–	–	–	–	–	–	10%	–	1%	4%	17%	–	17%	–
Ifop-Fiducial	14–15 Oct 2021	1,516	0.5%	0.5%	2%	8%	2%	6%	7%	25%	–	10%	–	–	–	–	–	–	1%	4%	18%	–	17%	–
Ifop-Fiducial	9–13 Oct 2021	4,503	0.5%	0.5%	1.5%	8%	1.5%	5%	7%	25%	–	–	15%	–	–	–	–	–	0.5%	2.5%	17%	–	16%	–
Ifop-Fiducial	9–13 Oct 2021	4,503	0.5%	0.5%	2%	8%	2%	5.5%	7%	26%	–	–	–	–	–	–	10%	–	1%	2.5%	18%	–	17%	–
Ifop-Fiducial	9–13 Oct 2021	4,503	0.5%	0.5%	2%	8%	2%	5%	7%	27%	–	8%	–	–	–	–	–	–	1%	4%	18.5%	–	17%	–
Ipsos	7–13 Oct 2021	16,228	1%	1%	2%	8%	2%	5%	9%	24%	–	–	13%	–	–	–	–	–	1%	3%	15%	–	16%	–
Ipsos	7–13 Oct 2021	16,228	1%	1%	2%	8%	2%	5%	9.5%	25.5%	–	–	–	–	–	–	10%	–	1%	3%	16%	–	16%	–
Ipsos	7–13 Oct 2021	16,228	1%	1%	2%	8%	2%	5%	9.5%	26%	–	9%	–	–	–	–	–	–	1%	3%	16%	–	16.5%	–
Ipsos	7–13 Oct 2021	16,228	1%	1%	2%	8%	2%	5%	9.5%	26%	–	–	16%	–	–	–	–	–	1%	4.5%	24%	–	–	–
Ipsos	7–13 Oct 2021	16,228	1%	1%	2%	8%	2%	5%	10%	27%	–	–	–	–	–	–	13%	–	1%	5%	25%	–	–	–
Ipsos	7–13 Oct 2021	16,228	1%	1%	2%	8%	2%	5%	10%	28%	–	12%	–	–	–	–	–	–	1%	5%	25%	–	–	–
Harris-Interactive	8–11 Oct 2021	1,337	1%	1%	2%	11%	2%	5%	7%	24%	<0.5%	–	14%	–	–	–	–	<0.5%	<0.5%	1%	15%	<0.5%	17%	<0.5%
Harris-Interactive	8–11 Oct 2021	1,337	1%	1%	2%	11%	2%	5%	8%	25%	<0.5%	–	–	–	–	–	11%	<0.5%	<0.5%	2%	15%	<0.5%	17%	<0.5%
Harris-Interactive	8–11 Oct 2021	1,337	1%	1%	2%	11%	2%	5%	8%	27%	<0.5%	7%	–	–	–	–	–	<0.5%	<0.5%	2%	16%	<0.5%	18%	<0.5%
Harris-Interactive	8–11 Oct 2021	1,337	1%	1%	2%	11%	2%	5%	7%	25%	<0.5%	–	15%	–	–	–	–	<0.5%	<0.5%	4%	26%	1%	–	<0.5%
Harris-Interactive	8–11 Oct 2021	1,337	1%	1%	2%	11%	4%	5%	8%	27%	<0.5%	–	–	–	–	–	11%	<0.5%	<0.5%	4%	26%	1%	–	<0.5%
Harris-Interactive	8–11 Oct 2021	1,337	1%	1%	2%	11%	4%	5%	8%	28%	<0.5%	9%	–	–	–	–	–	<0.5%	<0.5%	4%	27%	1%	–	<0,5%
BVA	7–11 Oct 2021	1,503	1.5%	0.5%	1.5%	8%	4%	4%	8%	26%	–	–	12%	–	–	–	–	–	1%	2.5%	16%	–	14%	1%
BVA	7–11 Oct 2021	1,503	1%	1%	1.5%	8%	4%	4%	8%	27%	–	–	–	–	–	–	10%	–	1.5%	2.5%	17%	–	14%	0.5%
BVA	7–11 Oct 2021	1,503	1%	1%	1.5%	8.5%	4%	4%	8%	28%	–	8.5%	–	–	–	–	–	–	1.5%	4%	17%	–	13%	1%
BVA	7–11 Oct 2021	1,503	1%	0.5%	1%	8%	4%	4%	8%	28%	–	–	15%	–	–	–	–	–	2%	4.5%	24%	–	–	1%
BVA	7–11 Oct 2021	1,503	1%	1%	1.5%	8%	4%	4%	8%	29%	–	–	–	–	–	–	12%	–	2%	4.5%	25%	–	–	1%
BVA	7–11 Oct 2021	1,503	1.5%	1%	1.5%	8%	4%	4%	8%	30%	–	10%	–	–	–	–	–	–	2%	4%	25%	–	–	1%
Odoxa	5–11 Oct 2021	4,010	1%	2%	2%	8%	2%	4.5%	6.5%	25%	–	–	13%	–	–	–	–	–	–	2%	18%	–	16%	–
Odoxa	5–11 Oct 2021	4,010	1%	2%	2%	9%	2.5%	4%	7%	26.5%	–	–	–	–	–	–	8.5%	–	–	2.5%	18.5%	–	16.5%	–
Odoxa	5–11 Oct 2021	4,010	1%	2%	2%	8.5%	–	–	11%	26%	–	–	13%	–	–	–	–	–	–	2.5%	18%	–	16%	–
Ifop	5–6 Oct 2021	921	0.5%	0.5%	2%	7%	2%	6%	8%	25%	–	–	16%	–	–	–	–	–	1%	2%	16%	–	14%	–
Ifop	5–6 Oct 2021	921	0.5%	0.5%	1.5%	8%	2.5%	6%	8%	26%	–	–	–	–	–	–	11%	–	1%	4%	18%	–	14%	–
Elabe	5–6 Oct 2021	1,309	1%	1%	2%	7%	1%	5%	9%	25%	1%	–	13%	–	–	–	–	<1%	1%	4%	16%	1%	13%	1%
Elabe	5–6 Oct 2021	1,309	1%	1%	2%	8%	2%	5%	9%	27%	<1%	–	–	–	–	–	8%	<1%	1%	4%	17%	1%	14%	1%
Elabe	5–6 Oct 2021	1,309	1%	1%	2%	8%	2%	5%	9%	28%	<1%	5%	–	–	–	–	–	<1%	1%	4%	18%	1%	14%	1%
Elabe	5–6 Oct 2021	1,309	1%	1%	2%	8%	2%	5%	10%	25%	1%	–	14%	–	–	–	–	<1%	2%	4%	23%	1%	–	1%
Elabe	5–6 Oct 2021	1,309	1%	1%	2%	8%	1%	4%	10%	27%	1%	–	–	–	–	–	11%	1%	2%	5%	24%	1%	–	1%
Elabe	5–6 Oct 2021	1,309	1%	1%	2%	8%	2%	5%	11%	29%	<1%	8%	–	–	–	–	–	<1%	2%	4%	25%	1%	–	1%
Harris-Interactive	1–4 Oct 2021	1,310	1%	1%	2%	11%	2%	6%	6%	24%	<0.5%	–	13%	–	–	–	–	<0.5%	<0.5%	2%	15%	<0.5%	17%	<0.5%
Harris-Interactive	1–4 Oct 2021	1,310	1%	1%	2%	11%	2%	6%	7%	25%	<0.5%	–	–	–	–	–	11%	<0.5%	<0.5%	2%	15%	<0.5%	17%	<0.5%
Harris-Interactive	1–4 Oct 2021	1,310	1%	1%	2%	11%	2%	6%	7%	27%	<0.5%	7%	–	–	–	–	–	<0.5%	<0.5%	2%	16%	<0.5%	18%	<0.5%
Ifop	29 Sep–1 Oct 2021	1,351	0.5%	1%	2%	7%	3.5%	5.5%	8%	24%	–	–	15%	–	–	–	–	–	1%	2.5%	18%	–	12%	–
Ifop	29 Sep–1 Oct 2021	1,351	0.5%	1%	2%	7%	3%	6%	8%	26%	–	–	–	–	–	–	11%	–	1%	2.5%	19%	–	13%	–
Ifop	29 Sep–1 Oct 2021	1,351	0.5%	1%	1.5%	7%	3%	6%	8.5%	26%	–	9.5%	–	–	–	–	–	–	1%	2.5%	19.5%	–	14%	–
Ifop	29 Sep–1 Oct 2021	1,351	0.5%	1%	2%	7.5%	3.5%	5.5%	8%	27%	–	–	–	5%	–	–	–	–	1%	3%	21%	–	15%	–
Ifop	29 Sep–1 Oct 2021	1,351	0.5%	1%	2%	7.5%	4%	6%	8.5%	26%	–	–	18%	–	–	–	–	–	1%	2.5%	23%	–	–	–
Ifop	29 Sep–1 Oct 2021	1,351	0.5%	1%	2.5%	8%	4%	6%	8.5%	27%	–	–	–	–	–	–	13%	–	1%	3.5%	25%	–	–	–
Ifop	29 Sep–1 Oct 2021	1,351	0.5%	1%	2%	8%	3.5%	6%	9%	27%	–	12%	–	–	–	–	–	–	2%	4%	25%	–	–	–
Ipsos	29–30 Sep 2021	1,500	1%	1%	1.5%	9%	1.5%	5.5%	9%	24%	–	–	14%	–	–	–	–	–	1%	1.5%	16%	–	15%	–
Ipsos	29–30 Sep 2021	1,500	1%	1%	1.5%	9%	1.5%	5.5%	9%	25%	–	–	–	–	–	–	12%	–	1%	1.5%	17%	–	15%	–
Ipsos	29–30 Sep 2021	1,500	1%	1%	1.5%	9%	1.5%	5.5%	9.5%	25.5%	–	11%	–	–	–	–	–	–	1%	1.5%	17%	–	15%	–
Ipsos	29–30 Sep 2021	1,500	1%	1%	1.5%	8.5%	1.5%	5.5%	9%	25%	–	–	17%	–	–	–	–	–	1%	4%	25%	–	–	–
Ipsos	29–30 Sep 2021	1,500	1%	1%	1.5%	8.5%	1.5%	5.5%	9%	26%	–	–	–	–	–	–	14%	–	1%	5%	26%	–	–	–
Ipsos	29–30 Sep 2021	1,500	1%	1%	1.5%	8.5%	1.5%	5.5%	9%	27%	–	13%	–	–	–	–	–	–	1%	5%	26%	–	–	–
Harris-Interactive	24–27 Sep 2021	1,379	1%	1%	1%	13%	2%	7%	6%	23%	<0.5%	–	14%	–	–	–	–	<0.5%	<0.5%	2%	16%	1%	13%	<0.5%
Harris-Interactive	24–27 Sep 2021	1,379	1%	1%	2%	13%	2%	7%	6%	24%	<0.5%	–	–	–	–	–	12%	<0.5%	<0.5%	2%	16%	1%	13%	<0.5%
Harris-Interactive	24–27 Sep 2021	1,379	1%	1%	2%	13%	2%	7%	6%	26%	<0.5%	8%	–	–	–	–	–	<0.5%	<0.5%	4%	16%	1%	14%	<0.5%
OpinionWay	22–23 Sep 2021	980	1%	1%	4%	8%	4%	6%	7%	24%	–	–	15%	–	–	–	–	–	–	2%	20%	–	10%	–
OpinionWay	22–23 Sep 2021	980	1%	1%	4%	7%	2%	7%	8%	25%	–	–	16%	–	–	–	–	–	–	5%	25%	–	–	–
OpinionWay	22–23 Sep 2021	980	1%	1%	4%	7%	2%	7%	8%	26%	–	–	–	–	–	–	15%	–	–	5%	25%	–	–	–
OpinionWay	22–23 Sep 2021	980	1%	1%	4%	8%	4%	7%	8%	28%	–	9%	–	–	–	–	–	–	–	6%	26%	–	–	–
Odoxa	22–23 Sep 2021	1,005	1.5%	2%	2%	8%	4%	4%	6%	26%	–	–	14%	–	–	–	–	–	–	2%	20.5%	–	10%	–
Odoxa	22–23 Sep 2021	1,005	2%	1.5%	4%	7.5%	4.5%	4%	5%	25%	–	–	–	–	–	–	13%	–	–	4%	21%	–	10.5%	–
Odoxa	22–23 Sep 2021	1,005	2%	1%	2%	8%	4%	5%	4%	26%	–	–	15%	–	–	–	–	–	–	4%	21%	–	10%	–
Odoxa	22–23 Sep 2021	1,005	2%	1%	4%	8%	4%	5%	4%	26%	–	–	–	–	–	–	12.5%	–	–	2.5%	21.5%	–	10.5%	–
Harris-Interactive	17–20 Sep 2021	1,314	1%	1%	4%	11%	2%	7%	6%	23%	<0.5%	–	14%	–	–	–	–	<0.5%	<0.5%	2%	18%	1%	11%	<0.5%
Harris-Interactive	17–20 Sep 2021	1,314	1%	1%	4%	11%	4%	8%	2%	23%	<0.5%	–	15%	–	–	–	–	<0.5%	<0.5%	2%	18%	1%	11%	<0.5%
Harris-Interactive	17–20 Sep 2021	1,314	1%	1%	4%	11%	4%	7%	6%	23%	<0.5%	–	–	–	–	–	12%	<0.5%	<0.5%	2%	19%	1%	11%	<0.5%
Ifop	14–15 Sep 2021	893	<0.5%	1%	4%	8%	2%	7%	6%	26%	<0.5%	–	15%	–	–	–	–	–	–	4%	20%	–	9%	–
Elabe	11–13 Sep 2021	1,334	<1%	1%	2%	8%	2%	7%	6%	26%	<1%	–	16%	–	–	–	–	<1%	2%	5%	23%	1%	–	<1%
Elabe	11–13 Sep 2021	1,334	<1%	1%	2%	8%	2%	6%	8%	26%	1%	–	–	–	–	–	14%	<1%	2%	6%	23%	1%	–	<1%
Elabe	11–13 Sep 2021	1,334	<1%	1%	2%	8%	2%	7%	7%	25%	1%	–	15%	–	–	–	–	<1%	1%	4%	18%	1%	8%	<1%
Elabe	11–13 Sep 2021	1,334	<1%	1%	2%	8%	1%	6%	7%	26%	1%	–	–	–	–	–	13%	<1%	2%	5%	19%	1%	8%	<1%
Harris-Interactive	10–13 Sep 2021	1,340	1%	1%	4%	11%	–	7%	7%	24%	1%	–	15%	–	–	–	–	–	1%	5%	22%	1%	–	1%
Harris-Interactive	10–13 Sep 2021	1,340	1%	1%	4%	11%	–	7%	7%	25%	1%	–	–	–	–	–	13%	–	1%	5%	23%	1%	–	1%
Harris-Interactive	10–13 Sep 2021	1,340	1%	1%	4%	11%	–	7%	7%	26%	1%	9%	–	–	–	–	–	–	1%	5%	26%	1%	–	1%
Harris-Interactive	10–13 Sep 2021	1,340	1%	1%	4%	11%	–	7%	7%	29%	1%	–	–	6%	–	–	–	–	1%	5%	26%	1%	–	1%
Harris-Interactive	10–13 Sep 2021	1,340	1%	1%	4%	11%	–	7%	7%	29%	1%	–	–	–	5%	–	–	–	1%	5%	27%	1%	–	1%
Harris-Interactive	10–13 Sep 2021	1,340	1%	1%	4%	12%	–	7%	7%	30%	1%	–	–	–	–	1%	–	–	1%	5%	29%	1%	–	1%
Harris-Interactive	10–13 Sep 2021	1,340	1%	1%	4%	11%	–	7%	7%	23%	1%	–	14%	–	–	–	–	–	1%	2%	19%	<0.5%	10%	<0.5%

==== January–September ====
Polling firm	Fieldwork date	Sample size	Nathalie Arthaud	Philippe Poutou	Fabien Roussel	Jean-Luc Mélenchon	Arnaud Montebourg	Anne Hidalgo	François Hollande	Éric Piolle	Yannick Jadot	Emmanuel Macron	Jean-Christophe Lagarde	Xavier Bertrand	Valérie Pécresse	Michel Barnier	François Baroin	Bruno Retailleau	Laurent Wauquiez	Jean-Frédéric Poisson	Jean Lassalle	Nicolas Dupont-Aignan	Marine Le Pen	Éric Zemmour	François Asselineau
Harris-Interactive	3–6 Sep 2021	1,330	1%	1%	2%	11%	–	8%	–	–	7%	23%	1%	16%	–	–	–	–	–	–	1%	5%	22%	–	1%
Harris-Interactive	3–6 Sep 2021	1,330	1%	1%	2%	11%	–	8%	–	–	7%	24%	1%	–	14%	–	–	–	–	–	1%	5%	23%	–	1%
Harris-Interactive	3–6 Sep 2021	1,330	1%	1%	3%	12%	–	8%	–	–	7%	25%	1%	–	–	9%	–	–	–	–	1%	5%	24%	–	1%
Harris-Interactive	3–6 Sep 2021	1,330	1%	1%	2%	11%	5%	–	–	–	7%	25%	1%	16%	–	–	–	–	–	–	1%	5%	23%	–	1%
Harris-Interactive	3–6 Sep 2021	1,330	1%	1%	2%	10%	–	8%	–	–	7%	23%	1%	15%	–	–	–	–	–	–	1%	3%	19%	7%	1%
Ipsos	2–3 Sep 2021	925	1.5%		1.5%	8%	2%	9%	–	–	10%	25%	–	17%	–	–	–	–	–	–	–	4%	22%	–	–
Ipsos	2–3 Sep 2021	925	1.5%		1.5%	8%	2%	9%	–	–	10%	25.5%	–	–	16%	–	–	–	–	–	–	4%	22%	–	–
Ipsos	2–3 Sep 2021	925	1.5%		1.5%	8%	2%	9%	–	–	11%	26%	–	–	–	13%	–	–	–	–	–	4%	23%	–	–
Ipsos	2–3 Sep 2021	925	1.5%		1.5%	8%	2%	9%	–	–	10%	24%	–	15%	–	–	–	–	–	–	–	4%	19%	8%	–
Ipsos	2–3 Sep 2021	925	1.5%		1.5%	8%	2%	9%	–	–	10%	24%	–	–	14%	–	–	–	–	–	–	4%	19%	8%	–
Ipsos	2–3 Sep 2021	925	1.5%		1.5%	8.5%	2%	9%	–	–	10%	24%	–	–	–	11%	–	–	–	–	–	4%	20%	8.5%	–
Ifop-Fiducial	31 Aug–2 Sep 2021	1,334	0.5%	1.5%	2%	9.5%	–	7%	–	–	8%	24%	–	17%	–	–	–	–	–	0.5%	2%	4%	24%	–	–
Ifop-Fiducial	31 Aug–2 Sep 2021	1,334	0.5%	1.5%	2.5%	9%	–	8%	–	–	8%	26%	–	–	14%	–	–	–	–	0.5%	1.5%	4%	25%	–	–
Ifop-Fiducial	31 Aug–2 Sep 2021	1,334	0.5%	1.5%	2.5%	10%	–	9%	–	–	8%	29%	–	–	–	–	–	–	–	–	2.5%	4%	26%	–	–
Ifop-Fiducial	31 Aug–2 Sep 2021	1,334	0.5%	1.5%	2.5%	9%	–	8%	–	–	8%	28%	–	–	–	11%	–	–	–	–	2%	3%	26%	–	–
Ifop-Fiducial	31 Aug–2 Sep 2021	1,334	0.5%	2%	2.5%	9%	–	9%	–	–	8%	29%	–	–	–	–	–	–	–	–	2%	5.5%	27%	–	–
Ifop-Fiducial	31 Aug–2 Sep 2021	1,334	0.5%	1.5%	2%	9%	–	7%	–	–	7.5%	24%	–	15%	–	–	–	–	–	–	1.5%	3%	22%	–	–
Ifop-Fiducial	31 Aug–2 Sep 2021	1,334	0.5%	1%	2.5%	9%	–	8.5%	–	–	8%	26%	–	–	12%	–	–	–	–	0.5%	1.5%	3.5%	21%	–	–
Ifop-Fiducial	31 Aug–2 Sep 2021	1,334	0.5%	1.5%	2.5%	8%	3%	8.5%	–	–	8%	23%	–	16%	–	–	–	–	–	–	2%	3%	23%	–	–
Harris Interactive	27–30 Aug 2021	1,328	1%	1%	3%	12%	–	7%	–	–	6%	24%	<0.5%	16%	–	–	–	–	–	–	1%	4%	23%	–	1%
Harris Interactive	27–30 Aug 2021	1,328	1%	1%	2%	12%	–	7%	–	–	6%	26%	<0.5%	–	13%	–	–	–	–	–	1%	4%	24%	–	1%
Harris Interactive	27–30 Aug 2021	1,328	1%	1%	3%	12%	–	7%	–	–	6%	30%	<0.5%	16%	–	–	–	–	–	–	1%	4%	24%	–	1%
Harris Interactive	27–30 Aug 2021	1,328	1%	1%	2%	13%	5%	–	–	–	6%	26%	<0.5%	11%	8%	–	–	–	–	–	1%	4%	24%	–	1%
Harris Interactive	20–23 Aug 2021	1,343	1%	1%	2%	11%	–	7%	–	–	7%	24%	1%	16%	–	–	–	–	–	–	1%	4%	24%	–	1%
Harris Interactive	20–23 Aug 2021	1,343	1%	1%	2%	11%	–	7%	–	–	8%	25%	1%	14%	–	–	–	–	–	–	1%	4%	26%	–	1%
Harris Interactive	20–23 Aug 2021	1,343	1%	1%	2%	11%	5%	–	–	–	8%	24%	1%	–	–	–	–	–	11%	–	1%	4%	24%	–	1%
Harris Interactive	20–23 Aug 2021	1,343	1%	1%	2%	11%	–	7%	–	–	8%	21%	1%	16%	–	–	–	–	–	–	1%	4%	23%	–	1%
Ipsos	20–22 Aug 2021	2,000	1%		2%	8%	–	9%	–	–	11%	24.5%	–	–	–	11%	–	–	–	–	–	4%	22.5%	7%	–
Ipsos	20–22 Aug 2021	2,000	1%		2%	7%	–	9%	–	–	11%	23%	–	15%	–	–	–	–	–	–	–	4%	21%	7%	–
Ipsos	20–22 Aug 2021	2,000	1%		2%	8%	–	9%	–	–	11%	23%	–	–	14%	–	–	–	–	–	–	4%	21%	7%	–
Ipsos	20–22 Aug 2021	2,000	1%		2%	8%	–	9%	–	–	11%	25.5%	–	–	–	–	–	–	10.5%	–	–	4%	22%	7%	–
Harris Interactive	2–5 Jul 2021	1,260	1%	1%	2%	10%	–	7%	–	–	7%	24%	1%	16%	–	–	–	–	–	<0.5%	1%	2%	22%	5%	1%
Harris Interactive	2–5 Jul 2021	1,260	1%	1%	2%	10%	–	7%	–	–	8%	26%	–	–	12%	–	–	–	–	<0.5%	1%	4%	24%	–	1%
Harris Interactive	2–5 Jul 2021	1,260	1%	1%	2%	10%	–	7%	–	–	7%	24%	–	17%	–	–	–	–	–	<0.5%	1%	4%	24%	–	1%
Ifop-Fiducial	29 Jun–2 Jul 2021	1,337	0.5%	1%	4%	7%	–	–	–	–	9%	26%	0.5%	18.5%	–	–	–	–	–	0.5%	2%	4%	27%	–	–
Ifop-Fiducial	29 Jun–2 Jul 2021	1,337	0.5%	1%	4%	7%	–	8%	–	–	–	28%	0.5%	18%	–	–	–	–	–	0.5%	2%	4.5%	26%	–	–
Ifop-Fiducial	29 Jun–2 Jul 2021	1,337	0.5%	1%	3.5%	7.5%	–	6%	–	–	7%	28%	0.5%	–	–	–	–	–	13%	0.5%	3%	3.5%	26%	–	–
Ifop-Fiducial	29 Jun–2 Jul 2021	1,337	0.5%	1%	3.5%	7.5%	–	6.5%	–	–	7%	26%	0.5%	–	14%	–	–	–	–	0.5%	2.5%	4.5%	26%	–	–
Ifop-Fiducial	29 Jun–2 Jul 2021	1,337	0.5%	1%	3.5%	7%	–	6%	–	–	7%	24%	0.5%	18%	–	–	–	–	–	0.5%	2%	4%	26%	–	–
Elabe	28–29 Jun 2021	1,124	1%	1%	1%	9%	–	5%	–	–	6%	29%	<1%	14%	–	–	–	–	–	1%	2%	5%	25%	–	1%
Elabe	28–29 Jun 2021	1,124	<1%	2%	2%	10%	–	5%	–	–	7%	30%	1%	–	11%	–	–	–	–	1%	2%	4%	26%	–	2%
Elabe	28–29 Jun 2021	1,124	1%	2%	2%	10%	–	4%	–	–	6%	31%	<1%	–	–	–	–	–	12%	1%	1%	5%	24%	–	1%
Harris Interactive	27–28 Jun 2021	1,003	1%	1%	1%	10%	–	6%	–	–	7%	25%	1%	17%	–	–	–	–	–	<0.5%	1%	4%	24%	–	1%
Harris Interactive	27–28 Jun 2021	1,003	1%	1%	1%	10%	–	7%	–	–	8%	28%	1%	–	11%	–	–	–	–	<0.5%	1%	4%	26%	–	1%
Harris Interactive	27–28 Jun 2021	1,003	1%	1%	1%	10%	–	7%	–	–	8%	27%	1%	–	–	–	–	–	11%	<0.5%	1%	4%	27%	–	1%
OpinionWay	27 Jun 2021	–	0%	1%	–	9%	–	7%	–	–	8%	26%	–	20%	–	–	–	–	–	–	–	5%	24%	–	–
OpinionWay	27 Jun 2021	–	1%	1%	–	10%	–	7%	–	–	8%	30%	–	–	12%	–	–	–	–	–	–	6%	25%	–	–
OpinionWay	27 Jun 2021	–	1%	1%	–	9%	–	7%	–	–	9%	31%	–	–	–	–	–	–	13%	–	–	5%	24%	–	–
Ipsos	25–26 Jun 2021	1,499	1.5%		2.5%	7%	–	8%	–	–	10%	24%	–	18%	–	–	–	–	–	–	–	5%	24%	–	–
Ipsos	25–26 Jun 2021	1,499	1.5%		2.5%	7%	–	9%	–	–	10%	26%	–	–	13%	–	–	–	–	–	–	5%	26%	–	–
Ipsos	25–26 Jun 2021	1,499	1.5%		2.5%	7%	–	9%	–	–	10%	27%	–	–	–	–	–	–	13%	–	–	5%	25%	–	–
Harris Interactive	20–21 Jun 2021	1,279	1%	1%	1%	10%	–	6%	–	–	7%	25%	1%	16%	–	–	–	–	–	<0.5%	1%	4%	26%	–	1%
Harris Interactive	20–21 Jun 2021	1,279	1%	1%	1%	10%	–	7%	–	–	7%	28%	1%	–	10%	–	–	–	–	<0.5%	1%	4%	28%	–	1%
Harris Interactive	20–21 Jun 2021	1,279	1%	1%	1%	10%	–	7%	–	–	8%	28%	1%	–	–	–	–	–	10%	<0.5%	1%	4%	27%	–	1%
Harris Interactive	11–14 Jun 2021	1,304	1%	2%	3%	13%	–	–	–	–	–	29%	1%	14%	–	–	–	–	–	<0.5%	1%	5%	29%	–	1%
Harris Interactive	11–14 Jun 2021	1,304	2%	3%	4%	–	–	–	–	–	12%	28%	1%	14%	–	–	–	–	–	<0.5%	1%	4%	29%	–	1%
Harris Interactive	11–14 Jun 2021	1,304	3%	3%	4%	–	–	9%	–	–	–	28%	1%	15%	–	–	–	–	–	<0.5%	1%	5%	29%	–	1%
Harris Interactive	11–14 Jun 2021	1,304	1%	1%	2%	11%	–	7%	–	–	6%	26%	1%	13%	–	–	–	–	–	<0.5%	1%	3%	27%	–	1%
Ifop	8–9 Jun 2021	901	0.5%	1%	2%	9%	–	5%	–	–	5.5%	26%	0.5%	13.5%	–	–	–	–	–	–	0.5%	3.5%	28%	5.5%	–
Harris Interactive	4–7 Jun 2021	1,295	1%	1%	1%	11%	–	7%	–	–	6%	28%	1%	–	–	–	10%	–	–	1%	1%	3%	28%	–	1%
Harris Interactive	4–7 Jun 2021	1,295	1%	1%	1%	11%	–	7%	–	–	6%	25%	1%	14%	–	–	–	–	–	<0.5%	1%	3%	28%	–	1%
Harris Interactive	28–31 May 2021	1,316	1%	1%	1%	12%	–	6%	–	–	6%	25%	<0.5%	14%	–	–	–	–	–	1%	1%	4%	28%	–	<0.5%
Harris Interactive	28–31 May 2021	1,316	1%	1%	1%	13%	–	6%	–	–	6%	27%	<0.5%	–	10%	–	–	–	–	1%	1%	4%	28%	–	1%
Harris Interactive	21–24 May 2021	1,272	1%	1%	1%	13%	–	6%	–	–	6%	25%	1%	14%	–	–	–	–	–	<0.5%	1%	4%	27%	–	<0.5%
Harris Interactive	21–24 May 2021	1,272	1%	1%	1%	13%	–	7%	–	–	6%	27%	1%	–	–	6%	–	–	–	<0.5%	1%	4%	27%	–	<0.5%
Ifop	18–20 May 2021	1,363	0.5%	1%	1.5%	11%	–	6%	–	–	6%	25%	0%	16%	–	–	–	–	–	0.5%	1.5%	5%	27%	–	–
Ifop	18–20 May 2021	1,363	0.5%	1%	2%	12%	–	6%	–	–	6%	26%	0.5%	–	10%	–	–	–	–	0.5%	1.5%	5%	29%	–	–
Ifop	18–20 May 2021	1,363	0.5%	1%	2%	12%	–	6%	–	–	5%	27%	1%	–	–	8%	–	–	–	0.5%	2%	6%	29%	–	–
Ifop	18–20 May 2021	1,363	0.5%	1%	2%	11%	–	6%	–	–	6%	28%	1.5%	–	–	–	–	6%	–	1%	2%	6%	29%	–	–
Ifop	18–20 May 2021	1,363	0.5%	0.5%	2%	12%	–	7%	–	–	6%	27%	0.5%	–	–	–	–	–	8%	0.5%	1%	5%	30%	–	–
Harris Interactive	14–17 May 2021	1,236	1%	1%	2%	12%	–	6%	–	–	6%	25%	1%	14%	–	–	–	–	–	0%	–	4%	27%	–	1%
Harris Interactive	14–17 May 2021	1,236	1%	1%	2%	13%	–	6%	–	–	6%	27%	2%	–	–	6%	–	–	–	0%	–	4%	29%	–	1%
Harris Interactive	16–19 Apr 2021	1,210	1%	1%	1%	11%	–	6%	–	–	6%	26%	1%	15%	–	–	–	–	–	0%	0%	5%	26%	–	1%
Harris Interactive	16–19 Apr 2021	1,210	1%	1%	1%	11%	–	6%	–	–	6%	28%	2%	–	12%	–	–	–	–	0%	0%	5%	26%	–	1%
Redfield & Wilton; Strategies	14–15 Apr 2021	2,200	–	–	–	16%	–	6%	–	–	8%	20%	–	10%	3%	6%	–	–	–	–	–	5%	23%	–	–
Ipsos	9–15 Apr 2021	10,000	1%		2%	8%	–	8%	–	–	10%	25%	–	16%	–	–	–	–	–	–	–	4%	26%	–	–
Ipsos	9–15 Apr 2021	10,000	1%		2%	8%	–	9%	–	–	10%	27%	–	–	11%	–	–	–	–	–	–	5%	27%	–	–
Ipsos	9–15 Apr 2021	10,000	1%		2%	8%	–	9%	–	–	10%	29%	–	–	–	–	–	8%	–	–	–	5%	28%	–	–
Elabe	12–14 Apr 2021	2,021	0%	2%	1%	11%	–	5%	–	–	6%	25%	1%	15%	–	–	–	–	–	0%	2%	5%	26%	–	1%
Elabe	12–14 Apr 2021	2,021	0%	2%	1%	11%	–	5%	–	–	5%	27%	2%	–	9%	–	–	–	–	0%	3%	6%	28%	–	1%
Ifop	2–8 Apr 2021	1,730	0.5%	1.5%	2%	11%	–	10%	–	2%	–	24%	0%	18%	–	–	–	–	–	0.5%	1.5%	4%	25%	–	–
Ifop	2–8 Apr 2021	1,730	1%	1%	2.5%	11%	–	7%	–	–	6%	24%	0%	16%	–	–	–	–	–	0.5%	1%	5%	25%	–	–
Ifop	2–8 Apr 2021	1,730	1%	1.5%	3%	11%	–	7%	–	–	7%	25%	0.5%	–	11%	–	–	–	–	0.5%	1.5%	5%	26%	–	–
Ifop	2–8 Apr 2021	1,730	1%	1.5%	3%	11%	–	7%	–	–	7%	26%	1%	–	–	–	–	6%	–	0.5%	3%	6%	27%	–	–
Ifop	2–8 Apr 2021	1,730	1%	1.5%	2.5%	10%	–	8%	–	–	7%	27%	1%	–	–	–	–	–	7%	0.5%	2%	5.5%	27%	–	–
Ifop	2–8 Apr 2021	1,730	0.5%	1%	–	13.5%	–	–	–	–	9%	25%	–	19%	–	–	–	–	–	0.5%	1.5%	4%	26%	–	–
Ifop	2–8 Apr 2021	1,730	1.5%	1%	–	13%	–	–	–	–	9%	28%	1%	–	13%	–	–	–	–	0.5%	1%	5%	27%	–	–
Ifop	2–8 Apr 2021	1,730	1%	1%	–	12%	–	10%	–	–	–	25%	–	20%	–	–	–	–	–	0.5%	1.5%	4%	25%	–	–
Ifop	2–8 Apr 2021	1,730	0.5%	1.5%	–	13%	–	10%	–	–	–	27%	1%	–	12%	–	–	–	–	1%	2%	5%	27%	–	–
Ifop	2–8 Apr 2021	1,730	1%	1%	2%	12%	5%	–	–	–	7%	23%	0.5%	18%	–	–	–	–	–	0.5%	1%	4%	25%	–	–
Ifop	5–11 Mar 2021	2,554	1%	1%	2%	10%	–	8%	–	–	6%	24%	0.5%	14%	–	–	–	–	–	–	1.5%	4%	28%	–	–
Harris Interactive	3–4 Mar 2021	1,000	1%	1%	1%	11%	–	6%	–	–	7%	25%	1%	15%	–	–	–	–	–	–	–	6%	25%	–	1%
Harris Interactive	3–4 Mar 2021	1,000	1%	1%	1%	11%	–	7%	–	–	8%	26%	1%	–	12%	–	–	–	–	–	–	6%	25%	–	1%
Ifop	23–24 Feb 2021	902	2%		–	12%	–	8%	–	–	9%	31%	–	21%	–	–	–	–	–	–	–	–	–	17%	–
Ipsos	27–28 Jan 2021	1,000	2%		–	10%	–	12%	–	2%	–	27%	–	14.5%	–	–	–	–	–	–	–	7.5%	25%	–	–
Ipsos	27–28 Jan 2021	1,000	2%		–	9%	–	–	–	–	17%	25%	–	15%	–	–	–	–	–	–	–	7%	25%	–	–
Ipsos	27–28 Jan 2021	1,000	2%		–	9%	–	16%	–	–	–	25%	–	16%	–	–	–	–	–	–	–	7%	25%	–	–
Ipsos	27–28 Jan 2021	1,000	2%		–	10%	–	9%	–	–	7.5%	24%	–	14.5%	–	–	–	–	–	–	–	7%	26%	–	–
Ipsos	27–28 Jan 2021	1,000	2.5%		–	10%	–	–	6%	–	9%	26%	–	14.5%	–	–	–	–	–	–	–	6%	26%	–	–
Ipsos	27–28 Jan 2021	1,000	2%		–	10%	4.5%	–	–	–	10%	25%	–	15%	–	–	–	–	–	–	–	7%	26.5%	–	–
Ipsos	27–28 Jan 2021	1,000	2%		–	9%	4%	8%	–	–	7%	24%	–	14%	–	–	–	–	–	–	–	7%	25%	–	–
Harris Interactive	19–20 Jan 2021	1,403	1%	1%	–	11%	–	6%	–	–	7%	24%	–	16%	–	–	–	–	–	–	–	7%	26%	–	1%
Harris Interactive	19–20 Jan 2021	1,403	1%	1%	–	11%	–	7%	–	–	8%	24%	–	–	14%	–	–	–	–	–	–	7%	26%	–	1%
Harris Interactive	19–20 Jan 2021	1,403	1%	1%	–	10%	5%	–	–	–	10%	23%	–	16%	–	–	–	–	–	–	–	7%	26%	–	1%
Harris Interactive	19–20 Jan 2021	1,403	1%	1%	–	11%	5%	–	–	–	9%	24%	–	–	14%	–	–	–	–	–	–	7%	27%	–	1%

=== 2017–2020 ===
Polling firm	Fieldwork date	Sample size	Nathalie Arthaud	Philippe Poutou	Fabien Roussel	Jean-Luc Mélenchon	Benoît Hamon	Bernard Cazeneuve	Olivier Faure	Anne Hidalgo	François Hollande	Ségolène Royal	Yannick Jadot	Emmanuel Macron	Jean-Christophe Lagarde	Xavier Bertrand	Valérie Pécresse	François Baroin	Rachida Dati	François Fillon	Bruno Retailleau	Laurent Wauquiez	Jean Lassalle	Nicolas Dupont-Aignan	Marine Le Pen	François Asselineau	Jacques Cheminade
Ifop	28 Sep–1 Oct 2020	1,805	1.5%	2.5%	–	15%	–	–	–	–	–	–	–	26%	2%	19%	–	–	–	–	–	–	3.5%	6.5%	24%	–	–
Ifop	28 Sep–1 Oct 2020	1,805	1.5%	3.5%	–	–	13%	–	–	–	–	–	–	26%	1%	19%	–	–	–	–	–	–	4%	6%	26%	–	–
Ifop	28 Sep–1 Oct 2020	1,805	2%	3.5%	–	–	–	–	–	13%	–	–	–	25%	1.5%	18%	–	–	–	–	–	–	4%	7%	26%	–	–
Ifop	28 Sep–1 Oct 2020	1,805	1%	1.5%	1%	11%	–	–	–	9%	–	–	6%	24%	0.5%	15.5%	–	–	–	–	–	–	2%	5.5%	23%	–	–
Ifop	28 Sep–1 Oct 2020	1,805	1%	1.5%	1%	12%	–	–	4%	–	–	–	7.5%	25%	1%	16%	–	–	–	–	–	–	2%	5%	24%	–	–
Ifop	28 Sep–1 Oct 2020	1,805	1%	2%	1%	11%	–	–	4%	–	–	–	8%	25%	1%	–	11%	–	–	–	–	–	2%	7%	27%	–	–
Ifop	28 Sep–1 Oct 2020	1,805	1%	1.5%	1%	11%	–	–	5%	–	–	–	8%	24%	1%	–	–	14%	–	–	–	–	2.5%	6%	25%	–	–
Ifop	28 Sep–1 Oct 2020	1,805	1%	2%	2%	13%	–	–	4%	–	–	–	8%	25%	2%	–	–	–	8%	–	–	–	3%	8%	24%	–	–
Ifop	28 Sep–1 Oct 2020	1,805	1%	2%	1.5%	12%	–	–	4%	–	–	–	8%	26%	2%	–	–	–	–	–	8%	–	3.5%	6%	26%	–	–
Ifop	28 Sep–1 Oct 2020	1,805	1%	2.5%	1%	10%	–	–	–	–	–	5%	8%	23%	0.5%	17%	–	–	–	–	–	–	2.5%	5.5%	24%	–	–
Ifop	28 Sep–1 Oct 2020	1,805	1%	2%	1%	10%	–	–	–	–	7%	–	7%	23%	0.5%	16%	–	–	–	–	–	–	2%	6%	24%	–	–
Harris Interactive	2–3 Jul 2020	1,429	1%	3%	–	12%	–	–	3%	–	–	–	8%	28%	–	13%	–	–	–	–	–	–	–	6%	25%	1%	<0.5%
Harris Interactive	2–3 Jul 2020	1,429	1%	3%	–	12%	–	–	3%	–	–	–	9%	28%	–	–	12%	–	–	–	–	–	–	6%	25%	1%	<0.5%
Harris Interactive	2–3 Jul 2020	1,429	1%	3%	–	12%	–	–	3%	–	–	–	8%	27%	–	–	–	14%	–	–	–	–	–	6%	25%	1%	<0.5%
Harris Interactive	2–3 Jul 2020	1,429	1%	3%	–	13%	–	–	3%	–	–	–	8%	32%	–	–	–	–	–	–	6%	–	–	6%	27%	1%	<0.5%
Elabe	30 Jun–1 Jul 2020	893	0.5%	1.5%	–	12.5%	–	–	2.5%	–	–	–	8.5%	30%	–	11%	–	–	–	–	–	–	–	5%	27.5%	1%	–
Elabe	30 Jun–1 Jul 2020	893	1%	1.5%	–	12.5%	–	–	–	–	–	–	9%	31%	–	12%	–	–	–	–	–	–	–	5.5%	26.5%	1%	–
Elabe	30 Jun–1 Jul 2020	893	1%	2.5%	–	11.5%	–	–	2.5%	–	–	–	8.5%	31%	–	–	–	12%	–	–	–	–	–	5.5%	24.5%	1%	–
Elabe	30 Jun–1 Jul 2020	893	1%	2%	–	12.5%	–	–	–	–	–	–	10%	31%	–	–	–	11%	–	–	–	–	–	5%	26.5%	1%	–
Ifop	18–19 Jun 2020	992	1%	0.5%	2%	11%	–	–	3%	–	–	–	8%	26%	0.5%	12%	–	–	–	–	–	–	2%	5.5%	28%	0.5%	–
Ifop	18–19 Jun 2020	992	1%	0.5%	1%	12%	–	–	3%	–	–	–	8%	28%	0.5%	–	–	12%	–	–	–	–	1.5%	5%	27%	0.5%	–
Ifop	28–30 Oct 2019	1,396	0.5%	1%	1.5%	11%	–	–	3%	–	–	–	8%	27%	1%	10%	–	–	–	–	–	–	1%	6%	28%	1%	0.5%
Ifop	28–30 Oct 2019	1,396	0.5%	1%	1.5%	11%	–	–	3%	–	–	–	9%	28%	1%	–	7%	–	–	–	–	–	1.5%	7%	28%	1%	0.5%
Ifop	28–30 Oct 2019	1,396	0.5%	1%	1.5%	11%	–	–	2.5%	–	–	–	7.5%	27%	1%	–	–	11%	–	–	–	–	1.5%	6.5%	28%	1%	<0.5%
Elabe	28–29 Oct 2019	1,003	1%	3%	–	13%	–	5%	–	–	–	–	6.5%	27%	–	9%	–	–	–	–	–	–	–	6%	28%	1.5%	–
Elabe	28–29 Oct 2019	1,003	0.5%	3.5%	–	12.5%	–	5.5%	–	–	–	–	7%	29%	–	–	5%	–	–	–	–	–	–	6%	29%	2%	–
Elabe	28–29 Oct 2019	1,003	0.5%	3%	–	13%	–	4.5%	–	–	–	–	6.5%	27.5%	–	–	–	9.5%	–	–	–	–	–	6.5%	27.5%	1.5%	–
Ifop	27–28 May 2019	927	1%	1%	–	9%	–	–	4%	–	–	–	12%	30%	–	–	–	–	–	–	–	8%	1%	5%	28%	1%	<0.5%
Ifop	1–2 Feb 2019	912	<0.5%	1%	–	12%	6%	–	3%	–	–	–	2%	30%	2%	–	–	–	–	–	–	8%	2%	6%	27%	1%	<0.5%
Ifop	11–13 Dec 2018	1,125	1%	1%	–	14%	8%	–	–	–	–	–	–	25%	–	–	–	–	–	13%	–	–	3%	7%	27%	1%	<0.5%
Ifop	11–13 Dec 2018	1,125	1.5%	1%	–	13%	8.5%	–	–	–	–	–	–	27.5%	–	–	–	–	–	–	–	10%	3%	7%	27.5%	1%	<0.5%
Ifop	12–16 Apr 2018	1,131	0.5%	1%	–	16.5%	6%	–	–	–	–	–	–	33%	–	–	–	–	–	12%	–	–	1%	6%	23%	1%	<0.5%
Ifop	12–16 Apr 2018	1,131	0.5%	1%	–	16.5%	7%	–	–	–	–	–	–	36%	–	–	–	–	–	–	–	8%	1%	6%	23%	1%	<0.5%
Ifop	13–18 Oct 2017	1,908	1%	1.5%	–	18%	7%	–	–	–	–	–	–	28%	–	–	–	–	–	15%	–	–	1.5%	5%	21.5%	1%	0.5%
2017 election	23 Apr 2017	–	0.6%	1.1%	–	19.6%	6.4%	–	–	–	–	–	–	24.0%	–	–	–	–	–	20.0%	–	–	1.2%	4.7%	21.3%	0.9%	0.2%

== Second round ==
=== Macron vs. Le Pen ===
==== Graphical summary ====
Local regression of polls conducted since 2021

Polling firm	Fieldwork date	Sample size	Abstention		
Polling firm	Fieldwork date	Sample size	Abstention	Macron LREM	Le Pen RN
2022 election	24 Apr 2022		28,01%	58.55%	41.45%
Ipsos	22 Apr 2022	12,129	26,5%	56.5%	43.5%
Cluster17	21–22 Apr 2022	3,099	25%	56%	44%
Elabe	21–22 Apr 2022	1,709	28%-32%	55.5%	44.5%
Harris-Interactive	21–22 Apr 2022	2,379	–	55%	45%
Ipsos-Sopra Steria	21–22 Apr 2022	1,600	26,5%	57%	43%
OpinionWay-Kéa	20–22 Apr 2022	2,329	28%	57%	43%
Ifop-Fiducial	18–22 Apr 2022	3,008	25.5%	55%	45%
BVA	21-21 Apr 2022	1,504	–	55.5%	44.5%
Odoxa	20–21 Apr 2022	1,427	–	53%	47%
OpinionWay-Kéa	20–21 Apr 2022	1,334	28%	56%	44%
AtlasIntel	19–21 Apr 2022	2,219	–	53%	47%
YouGov	19–21 Apr 2022	2,521	–	56%	44%
Ipsos-Sopra Steria	19–21 Apr 2022	1,600	27%	57.5%	42.5%
Cluster17	19–20 Apr 2022	2,726	26%	55%	45%
Ipsos-Sopra Steria	18–20 Apr 2022	1,698	28%	56.5%	43.5%
OpinionWay-Kéa	17–20 Apr 2022	1,709	29%	56%	44%
Ifop-Fiducial	16–20 Apr 2022	3,008	26.5%	55.5%	44.5%
Elabe	18–19 Apr 2022	1,598	–	54.5%	45.5%
Ipsos-Sopra Steria	17–19 Apr 2022	1,687	29%	56.5%	43.5%
OpinionWay-Kéa	16–19 Apr 2022	1,597	30%	56%	44%
Ifop-Fiducial	15–19 Apr 2022	3,012	26%	55%	45%
Cluster17	17–18 Apr 2022	2,793	27%	53.5%	46.5%
Kantar	15–18 Apr 2022	1,504	–	55%	45%
Harris-Interactive	15–18 Apr 2022	2,363	–	54%	46%
Ipsos-Sopra Steria	15–18 Apr 2022	1,682	28%	56%	44%
Ifop-Fiducial	14–18 Apr 2022	3,015	25.5%	54.5%	45.5%
Ipsos-Sopra Steria	14–16 Apr 2022	1,676	28%	55.5%	44.5%
Odoxa	14–15 Apr 2022	1,005	–	53%	47%
Ipsos-Sopra Steria	13–15 Apr 2022	1,674	29%	56%	44%
OpinionWay-Kéa	12–15 Apr 2022	1,602	26%	54%	46%
Ifop-Fiducial	12–15 Apr 2022	1,500	25%	53.5%	46.5%
Cluster17	13–14 Apr 2022	3,329	27%	53%	47%
BVA	13–14 Apr 2022	1,502	–	54%	46%
OpinionWay	13–14 Apr 2022	1,024	–	53%	47%
AtlasIntel	12–14 Apr 2022	2,431	17.4%	52%	48%
Ipsos-Sopra Steria	12–14 Apr 2022	1,692	28%	55%	45%
Ifop-Fiducial	11–14 Apr 2022	1,500	25%	53.5%	46.5%
OpinionWay-Kéa	11–14 Apr 2022	1,611	27.8%	53%	47%
Elabe	12–13 Apr 2022	1,627	–	53.5%	46.5%
OpinionWay-Kéa	11–13 Apr 2022	1,623	26%	53%	47%
Ipsos-Sopra Steria	11–13 Apr 2022	1,693	27%	55%	45%
Ifop-Fiducial	10–13 Apr 2022	1,500	25.5%	53%	47%
OpinionWay-Kéa	10–12 Apr 2022	1,600	–	54%	46%
Ifop-Fiducial	10–12 Apr 2022	2,004	25.5%	52.5%	47.5%
Harris-Interactive	10–11 Apr 2022	2,477	–	53%	47%
OpinionWay	10–11 Apr 2022	1,059	–	54%	46%
OpinionWay-Kéa	10–11 Apr 2022	2,174	26%	55%	45%
Ifop-Fiducial	10–11 Apr 2022	1,003	25%	52.5%	47.5%
Odoxa	10 Apr 2022	1,505	–	54.5%	45.5%
Ipsos-Sopra Steria	10 Apr 2022	1,172	–	54%	46%
Elabe	10 Apr 2022	1,509	–	52%	48%
OpinionWay	10 Apr 2022	1,739	–	54%	46%
Ipsos	10 Apr 2022	2,000	–	54%	46%
Ifop-Fiducial	10 Apr 2022	1,004	–	51%	49%
Harris-Interactive	7–8 Apr 2022	1,889	18%	51.5%	48.5%
Elabe	7–8 Apr 2022	1,691	–	51%	49%
Ipsos-Sopra Steria	6–8 Apr 2022	1,709	–	53%	47%
OpinionWay-Kéa	5–8 Apr 2022	2,041	–	54%	46%
Ifop-Fiducial	5–8 Apr 2022	3,016	27%	52%	48%
BVA	6–7 Apr 2022	1,010	–	53%	47%
Ipsos-Sopra Steria	5–7 Apr 2022	1,716	–	53%	47%
OpinionWay-Kéa	4–7 Apr 2022	2,043	–	53%	47%
Ifop-Fiducial	4–7 Apr 2022	3,010	–	52%	48%
YouGov	4–7 Apr 2022	1,783	–	51%	49%
Odoxa	5–6 Apr 2022	1,897	25%	55%	45%
AtlasIntel	4–6 Apr 2022	1,946	18%	49.5%	50.5%
Ipsos-Sopra Steria	4–6 Apr 2022	1,712	–	54%	46%
OpinionWay-Kéa	3–6 Apr 2022	1,902	–	53%	47%
Ifop-Fiducial	2–6 Apr 2022	3,010	–	52.5%	47.5%
Elabe	4–5 Apr 2022	1,538	–	53%	47%
Ipsos-Sopra Steria	3–5 Apr 2022	1,719	–	54%	46%
OpinionWay-Kéa	2–5 Apr 2022	1,777	–	53%	47%
Ifop-Fiducial	1–5 Apr 2022	3,007	–	53%	47%
Ipsos	2–4 Apr 2022	12,600	–	54%	46%
Harris-Interactive	1–4 Apr 2022	2,531	–	51.5%	48.5%
OpinionWay-Kéa	1–4 Apr 2022	1,666	–	53%	47%
Ipsos-Sopra Steria	1–4 Apr 2022	1,687	–	54%	46%
Ifop-Fiducial	31 Mar–4 Apr 2022	3,008	–	53%	47%
Ipsos-Sopra Steria	30 Mar–2 Apr 2022	1,963	–	53%	47%
Ifop	31 Mar–1 Apr 2022	1,405	–	53%	47%
Elabe	31 Mar–1 Apr 2022	1,377	–	53%	47%
OpinionWay-Kéa	29 Mar–1 Apr 2022	1,576	–	55%	45%
Ipsos-Sopra Steria	29 Mar–1 Apr 2022	1,708	–	54%	46%
Ifop-Fiducial	29 Mar–1 Apr 2022	2,994	–	53.5%	46.5%
BVA	30–31 Mar 2022	1,502	–	54.5%	45.5%
YouGov	28–31 Mar 2022	1,434	–	54%	46%
OpinionWay-Kéa	28–31 Mar 2022	1,562	–	55%	45%
Ipsos-Sopra Steria	28–31 Mar 2022	1,736	–	54%	46%
Ifop-Fiducial	28–31 Mar 2022	2,995	–	54%	46%
Elabe	28–30 Mar 2022	1,531	–	52.5%	47.5%
OpinionWay-Kéa	27–30 Mar 2022	1,633	–	55%	45%
Ipsos-Sopra Steria	27–30 Mar 2022	1,728	–	55%	45%
Ifop-Fiducial	26–30 Mar 2022	2,494	–	53.5%	46.5%
OpinionWay-Kéa	26–29 Mar 2022	1,617	–	56%	44%
Ipsos-Sopra Steria	25–29 Mar 2022	1,738	–	56%	44%
Ifop-Fiducial	25–29 Mar 2022	2,004	–	53%	47%
Harris-Interactive	25–28 Mar 2022	2,384	–	54%	46%
OpinionWay-Kéa	25–28 Mar 2022	1,627	–	56%	44%
Ipsos-Sopra Steria	24–28 Mar 2022	1,723	–	57%	43%
Ifop-Fiducial	25–28 Mar 2022	1,501	–	53%	47%
Ipsos-Sopra Steria	23–26 Mar 2022	1,726	–	58%	42%
OpinionWay-Kéa	22–25 Mar 2022	1,636	–	55%	45%
Ipsos-Sopra Steria	22–25 Mar 2022	1,718	–	58%	42%
Ifop-Fiducial	22–25 Mar 2022	1,504	–	53.5%	46.5%
Ipsos	21–24 Mar 2022	13,269	–	57%	43%
OpinionWay-Kéa	21–24 Mar 2022	1,619	–	55%	45%
Ipsos-Sopra Steria	21–24 Mar 2022	1,724	–	59%	41%
Ifop-Fiducial	21–24 Mar 2022	1,505	–	54%	46%
BVA	22–23 Mar 2022	958	–	56%	44%
OpinionWay-Kéa	20–23 Mar 2022	1,614	–	56%	44%
Ipsos-Sopra Steria	20–23 Mar 2022	1,721	–	59%	41%
Ifop-Fiducial	19–23 Mar 2022	1,507	–	54.5%	45.5%
OpinionWay-Kéa	19–22 Mar 2022	1,626	–	56%	44%
Ipsos-Sopra Steria	18–22 Mar 2022	1,741	–	59%	41%
Ifop-Fiducial	18–22 Mar 2022	1,506	–	55%	45%
Elabe	20–21 Mar 2022	1,551	–	56%	44%
Harris-Interactive	18–21 Mar 2022	2,344	–	57%	43%
OpinionWay-Kéa	18–21 Mar 2022	1,636	–	57%	43%
Ipsos-Sopra Steria	17–21 Mar 2022	1,748	–	61%	39%
Ifop-Fiducial	17–21 Mar 2022	1,508	–	56%	44%
Ipsos-Sopra Steria	16–19 Mar 2022	1,723	–	62%	38%
Ifop	17–18 Mar 2022	1,359	–	62%	38%
OpinionWay-Kéa	15–18 Mar 2022	1,542	–	58%	42%
Ipsos-Sopra Steria	15–18 Mar 2022	1,684	–	62%	38%
Ifop-Fiducial	15–18 Mar 2022	1,507	–	57%	43%
OpinionWay-Kéa	14–17 Mar 2022	1,550	–	58%	42%
Ipsos-Sopra Steria	14–17 Mar 2022	1,650	–	61%	39%
Ifop-Fiducial	14–17 Mar 2022	1,506	–	57.5%	42.5%
BVA	15–16 Mar 2022	1,505	–	58%	42%
Elabe	15–16 Mar 2022	1,580	–	59.5%	40.5%
OpinionWay-Kéa	13–16 Mar 2022	1,597	–	58%	42%
Ipsos-Sopra Steria	13–16 Mar 2022	1,651	–	61%	39%
Ifop-Fiducial	12–16 Mar 2022	1,506	–	57%	43%
OpinionWay-Kéa	12–15 Mar 2022	1,644	–	58%	42%
Ipsos-Sopra Steria	11–15 Mar 2022	1,651	–	60%	40%
Ifop-Fiducial	11–15 Mar 2022	1,506	–	58%	42%
Harris-Interactive	11–14 Mar 2022	2,390	–	58%	42%
OpinionWay-Kéa	11–14 Mar 2022	1,688	–	58%	42%
Ipsos	10–14 Mar 2022	13,749	–	59%	41%
Ipsos-Sopra Steria	10–14 Mar 2022	1,651	–	60%	40%
Ifop-Fiducial	10–14 Mar 2022	1,507	–	58%	42%
Ipsos-Sopra Steria	9–12 Mar 2022	1,653	–	60%	40%
Odoxa	9–11 Mar 2022	2,010	–	58%	42%
OpinionWay-Kéa	8–11 Mar 2022	1,639	–	59%	41%
Ifop-Fiducial	8–11 Mar 2022	1,505	–	57.5%	42.5%
OpinionWay-Kéa	7–10 Mar 2022	1,638	–	59%	41%
Ifop-Fiducial	7–10 Mar 2022	1,505	–	57.5%	42.5%
BVA	8–9 Mar 2022	977	–	59%	41%
OpinionWay-Kéa	6–9 Mar 2022	1,661	–	59%	41%
Ifop-Fiducial	5–9 Mar 2022	1,505	–	57%	43%
Elabe	7–8 Mar 2022	1,580	–	61%	39%
OpinionWay-Kéa	5–8 Mar 2022	1,677	–	59%	41%
Ifop-Fiducial	4–8 Mar 2022	1,505	–	56%	44%
Harris-Interactive	4–7 Mar 2022	2,394	–	55%	45%
OpinionWay-Kéa	4–7 Mar 2022	1,672	–	59%	41%
Ifop-Fiducial	3–7 Mar 2022	1,506	–	56%	44%
OpinionWay-Kéa	1–4 Mar 2022	1,624	–	57%	43%
Ifop-Fiducial	1–4 Mar 2022	1,504	–	56.5%	43.5%
Ipsos	2–3 Mar 2022	3,599	–	59%	41%
OpinionWay-Kéa	28 Feb–3 Mar 2022	1,608	–	56%	44%
Ifop-Fiducial	28 Feb–3 Mar 2022	1,508	–	56.5%	43.5%
BVA	1–2 Mar 2022	1,500	–	60%	40%
OpinionWay-Kéa	27 Feb–2 Mar 2022	1,642	–	55%	45%
Ifop-Fiducial	26 Feb–2 Mar 2022	1,505	–	56.5%	43.5%
OpinionWay-Kéa	26 Feb–1 Mar 2022	1,651	–	54%	46%
Ifop-Fiducial	25 Feb–1 Mar 2022	1,504	–	56.5%	43.5%
Elabe	27–28 Feb 2022	1,431	–	57.5%	42.5%
Harris-Interactive	25–28 Feb 2022	2,311	–	55%	45%
OpinionWay-Kéa	25–28 Feb 2022	1,656	–	54%	46%
Ifop-Fiducial	24–28 Feb 2022	1,504	–	56.5%	43.5%
Ipsos	24–27 Feb 2022	13,651	–	59%	41%
OpinionWay-Kéa	22–25 Feb 2022	1,598	–	55%	45%
Ifop-Fiducial	22–25 Feb 2022	1,503	–	56%	44%
OpinionWay-Kéa	21–24 Feb 2022	1,603	–	56%	44%
Ifop-Fiducial	21–24 Feb 2022	1,502	–	55%	45%
OpinionWay-Kéa	20–23 Feb 2022	1,639	–	56%	44%
Ifop-Fiducial	19–23 Feb 2022	1,502	–	55.5%	44.5%
Elabe	21–22 Feb 2022	1,490	–	55.5%	44.5%
OpinionWay-Kéa	19–22 Feb 2022	1,633	–	55%	45%
Ifop-Fiducial	18–22 Feb 2022	1,501	–	55.5%	44.5%
Harris-Interactive	18–21 Feb 2022	2,457	–	55%	45%
OpinionWay-Kéa	18–21 Feb 2022	1,638	–	55%	45%
Ifop-Fiducial	17–21 Feb 2022	1,502	–	56%	44%
OpinionWay-Kéa	15–18 Feb 2022	1,597	–	56%	44%
Ifop-Fiducial	15–18 Feb 2022	1,505	–	55%	45%
OpinionWay-Kéa	14–17 Feb 2022	1,578	–	56%	44%
Ifop-Fiducial	14–17 Feb 2022	1,505	–	54.5%	45.5%
BVA	15–16 Feb 2022	893	–	56%	44%
Odoxa	15–16 Feb 2022	2,010	–	56%	44%
Elabe	14–16 Feb 2022	1,449	–	57%	43%
OpinionWay-Kéa	13–16 Feb 2022	1,604	–	57%	43%
Ifop-Fiducial	12–16 Feb 2022	1,504	–	55%	45%
OpinionWay-Kéa	12–15 Feb 2022	1,746	–	57%	43%
Ifop-Fiducial	11–15 Feb 2022	1,503	–	55%	45%
Harris-Interactive	11–14 Feb 2022	2,476	–	56%	44%
OpinionWay-Kéa	11–14 Feb 2022	1,646	–	56%	44%
Ifop-Fiducial	10–14 Feb 2022	1,503	–	55%	45%
OpinionWay-Kéa	8–11 Feb 2022	1,615	–	56%	44%
Ifop-Fiducial	8–11 Feb 2022	1,503	–	55%	45%
OpinionWay-Kéa	7–10 Feb 2022	1,648	–	55%	45%
Ifop-Fiducial	7–10 Feb 2022	1,502	–	54.5%	45.5%
BVA	7–9 Feb 2022	1,505	–	56%	44%
OpinionWay-Kéa	6–9 Feb 2022	1,669	–	55%	45%
Ifop-Fiducial	5–9 Feb 2022	1,504	–	54%	46%
Elabe	7–8 Feb 2022	1,488	–	56%	44%
OpinionWay-Kéa	5–8 Feb 2022	1,658	–	55%	45%
Ifop-Fiducial	4–8 Feb 2022	1,504	–	55%	45%
Harris-Interactive	4–7 Feb 2022	2,421	–	56%	44%
OpinionWay-Kéa	4–7 Feb 2022	1,630	–	56%	44%
Ifop-Fiducial	3–7 Feb 2022	1,504	–	55.5%	44.5%
Ipsos-Sopra Steria	3–7 Feb 2022	12,499	–	57%	43%
OpinionWay-Kéa	1–4 Feb 2022	1,609	–	56%	44%
Ifop-Fiducial	1–4 Feb 2022	1,503	–	55.5%	44.5%
Ipsos	1–3 Feb 2022	1,535	–	57%	43%
OpinionWay-Kéa	31 Jan–3 Feb 2022	1,609	–	56%	44%
Ifop-Fiducial	31 Jan–3 Feb 2022	1,504	–	55%	45%
Elabe	31 Jan–2 Feb 2022	1,482	–	56%	44%
OpinionWay-Kéa	30 Jan–2 Feb 2022	1,639	–	55%	45%
Ifop-Fiducial	29 Jan–2 Feb 2022	1,503	–	55%	45%
OpinionWay-Kéa	29 Jan–1 Feb 2022	1,666	–	56%	44%
Ifop-Fiducial	29 Jan–1 Feb 2022	1,504	–	54.5%	45.5%
Harris-Interactive	28–31 Jan 2022	2,562	–	55%	45%
OpinionWay-Kéa	28–31 Jan 2022	1,655	–	56%	44%
Ifop-Fiducial	27–31 Jan 2022	1,503	–	55%	45%
OpinionWay-Kéa	25–28 Jan 2022	1,568	–	56%	44%
Ifop-Fiducial	25–28 Jan 2022	1,503	–	55.5%	44.5%
OpinionWay-Kéa	24–27 Jan 2022	1,567	–	56%	44%
Ifop-Fiducial	24–27 Jan 2022	1,504	–	56.5%	43.5%
Elabe	24–26 Jan 2022	1,508	–	57%	43%
OpinionWay-Kéa	23–26 Jan 2022	1,629	–	56%	44%
Ifop-Fiducial	22–26 Jan 2022	1,505	–	56.5%	43.5%
OpinionWay-Kéa	22–25 Jan 2022	1,634	–	56%	44%
Ifop-Fiducial	21–25 Jan 2022	1,504	–	56%	44%
Harris-Interactive	21–24 Jan 2022	2,496	–	54%	46%
OpinionWay-Kéa	21–24 Jan 2022	1,650	–	57%	43%
Ifop-Fiducial	20–24 Jan 2022	1,507	–	56%	44%
OpinionWay-Kéa	18–21 Jan 2022	1,613	–	57%	43%
Ifop-Fiducial	18–21 Jan 2022	1,507	–	55.5%	44.5%
OpinionWay-Kéa	17–20 Jan 2022	1,603	–	57%	43%
Ifop-Fiducial	17–20 Jan 2022	1,505	–	54.5%	45.5%
OpinionWay-Kéa	16–19 Jan 2022	1,626	–	57%	43%
Ifop-Fiducial	15–19 Jan 2022	1,504	–	54%	46%
OpinionWay-Kéa	15–18 Jan 2022	1,624	–	57%	43%
Ifop-Fiducial	14–18 Jan 2022	1,514	–	54.5%	45.5%
OpinionWay-Kéa	15–17 Jan 2022	1,093	–	56%	44%
Ipsos	14–17 Jan 2022	12,542	–	57%	43%
Harris-Interactive	14–17 Jan 2022	2,599	–	55%	45%
Ifop-Fiducial	13–17 Jan 2022	1,517	–	55.5%	44.5%
OpinionWay-Kéa	11–14 Jan 2022	1,577	–	56%	44%
Ifop-Fiducial	11–14 Jan 2022	1,511	–	57%	43%
OpinionWay-Kéa	10–13 Jan 2022	1,575	–	56%	44%
Ifop-Fiducial	10–13 Jan 2022	1,509	–	58%	42%
OpinionWay-Kéa	9–12 Jan 2022	1,604	–	56%	44%
Ifop-Fiducial	8–12 Jan 2022	1,505	–	57%	43%
Elabe	10–11 Jan 2022	1,465	–	54.5%	45.5%
OpinionWay-Kéa	8–11 Jan 2022	1,613	–	56%	44%
Ifop-Fiducial	7–11 Jan 2022	1,504	–	57%	43%
Harris-Interactive	7–10 Jan 2022	2,600	–	55%	45%
OpinionWay-Kéa	7–10 Jan 2022	1,644	–	57%	43%
Ifop-Fiducial	6–10 Jan 2022	1,502	–	58%	42%
OpinionWay-Kéa	4–7 Jan 2022	1,561	–	57%	43%
Ipsos	5–6 Jan 2022	1,500	–	58%	42%
OpinionWay-Kéa	3–6 Jan 2022	1,534	–	56%	44%
Ifop-Fiducial	3–5 Jan 2022	1,332	–	59%	41%
OpinionWay-Kéa	2–5 Jan 2022	1,501	–	57%	43%
OpinionWay-Kéa	2–4 Jan 2022	1,568	–	57%	43%
OpinionWay-Kéa	2–3 Jan 2022	1,059	–	58%	42%
Harris-Interactive	28–31 Dec 2021	2,550	–	55%	45%
Harris-Interactive	10–13 Dec 2021	2,613	–	56%	44%
Ifop-Fiducial	4–6 Dec 2021	1,341	–	56%	44%
Harris-Interactive	3–6 Dec 2021	2,613	–	55%	45%
Harris-Interactive	26–29 Nov 2021	2,601	–	54%	46%
Ifop-Fiducial	23–25 Nov 2021	1,351	–	54%	46%
Elabe	23–24 Nov 2021	1,491	–	55%	45%
Harris-Interactive	19–22 Nov 2021	2,624	–	55%	45%
OpinionWay	15–17 Nov 2021	1,521	31%	56%	44%
Harris-Interactive	12–15 Nov 2021	2,609	–	56%	44%
Elabe	10–11 Nov 2021	1,484	–	58%	42%
Harris-Interactive	5–8 Nov 2021	2,569	–	55%	45%
Ifop-Fiducial	3–5 Nov 2021	1,358	–	56%	44%
Harris-Interactive	1–2 Nov 2021	2,505	–	54%	46%
Elabe	25–27 Oct 2021	1,300	–	55%	45%
Harris-Interactive	22–25 Oct 2021	2,497	–	55%	45%
OpinionWay	18–20 Oct 2021	1,066	–	58%	42%
Harris-Interactive	15–18 Oct 2021	2,544	–	54%	46%
Ifop-Fiducial	14–15 Oct 2021	1,516	–	56%	44%
Harris-Interactive	8–11 Oct 2021	1,337	–	54%	46%
Elabe	5–6 Oct 2021	1,309	–	60%	40%
Harris-Interactive	1–4 Oct 2021	1,310	–	53%	47%
Ifop	29 Sep–1 Oct 2021	1,351	–	58%	42%
Harris-Interactive	24–27 Sep 2021	1,379	–	54%	46%
Odoxa	20–23 Sep 2021	1,005	–	58%	42%
Harris-Interactive	17–20 Sep 2021	1,314	–	55%	45%
Elabe	11–13 Sep 2021	1,320	–	59%	41%
Harris-Interactive	10–13 Sep 2021	1,340	–	54%	46%
Harris-Interactive	3–6 Sep 2021	1,330	–	54%	46%
Ifop	31 Aug–2 Sep 2021	1,334	–	56%	44%
Harris Interactive	27–30 Aug 2021	1,328	–	55%	45%
Harris Interactive	20–23 Aug 2021	1,343	–	55%	45%
Harris Interactive	2–5 Jul 2021	1,260	–	55%	45%
Ifop	29 Jun–2 Jul 2021	1,337	–	57%	43%
Elabe	28–29 Jun 2021	1,006	–	60%	40%
Harris Interactive	27–28 Jul 2021	1,279	–	55%	45%
Harris Interactive	20–21 Jun 2021	1,279	–	54%	46%
Harris Interactive	11–14 Jun 2021	1,304	–	53%	47%
Harris Interactive	4–7 Jun 2021	1,295	–	53%	47%
Harris Interactive	28–31 May 2021	1,316	–	54%	46%
Harris Interactive	21–24 May 2021	1,272	–	54%	46%
Ifop	18–20 May 2021	1,363	–	54%	46%
Harris Interactive	14–17 May 2021	1,236	–	53%	47%
Harris Interactive	16–19 Apr 2021	1,210	–	54%	46%
Redfield & Wilton Strategies	14–15 Apr 2021	2,200	–	56%	44%
Ipsos	9–15 Apr 2021	10,000	23%	57%	43%
Elabe	12–14 Apr 2021	2001	26%	56%	44%
Ifop	2–8 Apr 2021	1,730	–	54%	46%
Ifop	5–11 Mar 2021	2,254	–	53%	47%
Harris Interactive	2–4 Mar 2021	1,209	–	53%	47%
Ipsos	27–28 Jan 2021	1,000	27%	56%	44%
Harris Interactive	19–20 Jan 2021	1,403	–	52%	48%
Harris Interactive	2–3 Jul 2020	1,429	–	58%	42%
Elabe	30 Jun–1 Jul 2020	893	38%	58.5%	41.5%
Ifop	18–19 Jun 2020	992	–	55%	45%
Ifop	28–30 Oct 2019	1,396	–	55%	45%
Ifop	27–28 May 2019	927	–	57%	43%
Ifop	1–2 Feb 2019	912	–	56%	44%
2017 election	7 May 2017	–	25.44%	66.10%	33.90%

=== Other potential matchups ===
The following polls reflect matchups involving a candidate who did not place in the top two in the first round.

==== Mélenchon vs. Macron ====
===== Graphical summary =====
Local regression of polls conducted since 2021

Polling firm	Fieldwork date	Sample size		
Polling firm	Fieldwork date	Sample size	Mélenchon LFI	Macron LREM
Harris-Interactive	7–8 Apr 2022	1,889	43%	57%
Ifop-Fiducial	5–8 Apr 2022	3,016	41%	59%
BVA	6–7 Apr 2022	1,010	42%	58%
Ifop-Fiducial	4–7 Apr 2022	3,010	42%	58%
YouGov	4–7 Apr 2022	1,783	42%	58%
AtlasIntel	4–6 Apr 2022	1,946	46.1%	53.9%
Ipsos-Sopra Steria	4–6 Apr 2022	1,712	40%	60%
Ifop-Fiducial	2–6 Apr 2022	3,010	41%	59%
Ipsos-Sopra Steria	3–5 Apr 2022	1,719	41%	59%
Ifop-Fiducial	1–5 Apr 2022	3,007	40.5%	59.5%
Harris-Interactive	1–4 Apr 2022	2,531	42%	58%
Ipsos-Sopra Steria	1–4 Apr 2022	1,687	42%	58%
Ifop-Fiducial	31 Mar–4 Apr 2022	3,008	40%	60%
Ipsos-Sopra Steria	29 Mar–1 Apr 2022	1,708	42%	58%
Ifop-Fiducial	29 Mar–1 Apr 2022	2,994	39.5%	60.5%
BVA	30–31 Mar 2022	1,502	38%	62%
Ipsos-Sopra Steria	28–31 Mar 2022	1,736	40%	60%
Ifop-Fiducial	28–31 Mar 2022	2,995	40%	60%
Ifop-Fiducial	26–30 Mar 2022	2,494	41%	59%
Ipsos-Sopra Steria	25–29 Mar 2022	1,738	40%	60%
Ifop-Fiducial	25–29 Mar 2022	2,004	41.5%	58.5%
Harris-Interactive	25–28 Mar 2022	2,384	39%	61%
Ipsos-Sopra Steria	24–28 Mar 2022	1,723	40%	60%
Ifop-Fiducial	25–28 Mar 2022	1,501	40.5%	59.5%
Ipsos-Sopra Steria	23–26 Mar 2022	1,726	38%	62%
Ifop-Fiducial	22–25 Mar 2022	1,504	40%	60%
Ifop-Fiducial	21–24 Mar 2022	1,505	39.5%	60.5%
BVA	22–23 Mar 2022	958	36%	64%
Ifop-Fiducial	19–23 Mar 2022	1,507	39%	61%
Ipsos-Sopra Steria	18–22 Mar 2022	1,741	36%	64%
Ifop-Fiducial	18–22 Mar 2022	1,506	38%	62%
Harris-Interactive	18–21 Mar 2022	2,344	37%	63%
Ipsos-Sopra Steria	17–21 Mar 2022	1,748	36%	64%
Ifop-Fiducial	17–21 Mar 2022	1,508	37%	63%
Ipsos-Sopra Steria	16–19 Mar 2022	1,723	36%	64%
Ipsos-Sopra Steria	15–18 Mar 2022	1,684	34%	66%
Ifop-Fiducial	15–18 Mar 2022	1,507	36%	64%
Ipsos-Sopra Steria	14–17 Mar 2022	1,650	33%	67%
Ifop-Fiducial	14–17 Mar 2022	1,506	37%	63%
BVA	15–16 Mar 2022	1,505	35%	65%
Elabe	15–16 Mar 2022	1,580	33.5%	66.5%
Ifop-Fiducial	12–16 Mar 2022	1,506	36%	64%
Ipsos-Sopra Steria	11–15 Mar 2022	1,651	33%	67%
Ifop-Fiducial	11–15 Mar 2022	1,506	35.5%	64.5%
Harris-Interactive	11–14 Mar 2022	2,390	36%	64%
Ipsos-Sopra Steria	10–14 Mar 2022	1,651	35%	65%
Ifop-Fiducial	10–14 Mar 2022	1,507	35%	65%
Ifop-Fiducial	8–11 Mar 2022	1,505	34%	66%
Ifop-Fiducial	7–10 Mar 2022	1,505	34%	66%
BVA	8–9 Mar 2022	977	34%	66%
Ifop-Fiducial	5–9 Mar 2022	1,505	35.5%	64.5%
Elabe	7–8 Mar 2022	1,580	31.5%	68.5%
Ifop-Fiducial	4–8 Mar 2022	1,505	36.5%	63.5%
Harris-Interactive	4–7 Mar 2022	2,394	33%	67%
Ifop-Fiducial	3–7 Mar 2022	1,506	37%	63%
Ipsos	2–3 Mar 2022	3,599	33%	67%
Harris-Interactive	25–28 Feb 2022	2,311	37%	63%
Harris-Interactive	26–29 Nov 2021	2,601	36%	64%
Harris-Interactive	19–22 Nov 2021	2,624	36%	64%
Harris-Interactive	12–15 Nov 2021	2,609	36%	64%
Harris-Interactive	5–8 Nov 2021	2,569	37%	63%
Harris-Interactive	28–30 Oct 2021	2,505	38%	62%
Harris-Interactive	22–25 Oct 2021	2,497	38%	62%
Harris-Interactive	15–18 Oct 2021	2,544	38%	62%
Harris-Interactive	8–11 Oct 2021	1,337	37%	63%
Harris-Interactive	1–4 Oct 2021	1,310	38%	62%

==== Macron vs. Zemmour ====
===== Graphical summary =====
Local regression of polls conducted since 2021

Polling firm	Fieldwork date	Sample size		
Polling firm	Fieldwork date	Sample size	Macron LREM	Zemmour REC
Harris-Interactive	7–8 Apr 2022	1,889	66%	34%
Ifop-Fiducial	5–8 Apr 2022	3,016	66%	34%
Ifop-Fiducial	4–7 Apr 2022	3,010	66.5%	33.5%
YouGov	4–7 Apr 2022	1,783	65%	35%
AtlasIntel	4–6 Apr 2022	1,946	60.8%	39.2%
Ifop-Fiducial	2–6 Apr 2022	3,010	66.5%	33.5%
Ifop-Fiducial	1–5 Apr 2022	3,007	67%	33%
Harris-Interactive	1–4 Apr 2022	2,531	65%	35%
Ifop-Fiducial	31 Mar–4 Apr 2022	3,008	66.5%	33.5%
Ifop-Fiducial	29 Mar–1 Apr 2022	2,994	66%	34%
YouGov	28–31 Mar 2022	1,434	70%	30%
Ifop-Fiducial	28–31 Mar 2022	2,995	66%	34%
Ifop-Fiducial	26–30 Mar 2022	2,494	65.5%	34.5%
Ifop-Fiducial	25–29 Mar 2022	2,004	65%	35%
Harris-Interactive	25–28 Mar 2022	2,384	67%	33%
Ifop-Fiducial	25–28 Mar 2022	1,501	64%	36%
Ifop-Fiducial	22–25 Mar 2022	1,504	64.5%	35.5%
Ifop-Fiducial	21–24 Mar 2022	1,505	65%	35%
Ifop-Fiducial	19–23 Mar 2022	1,507	65.5%	34.5%
Ifop-Fiducial	18–22 Mar 2022	1,506	65%	35%
Harris-Interactive	18–21 Mar 2022	2,344	67%	33%
Ifop-Fiducial	17–21 Mar 2022	1,508	65%	35%
Ipsos-Sopra Steria	15–18 Mar 2022	1,684	69%	31%
Ifop-Fiducial	15–18 Mar 2022	1,507	66.5%	33.5%
Ipsos-Sopra Steria	14–17 Mar 2022	1,650	68%	32%
Ifop-Fiducial	14–17 Mar 2022	1,506	65.5%	34.5%
BVA	15–16 Mar 2022	1,505	66%	34%
Ipsos-Sopra Steria	13–16 Mar 2022	1,651	68%	32%
Ifop-Fiducial	12–16 Mar 2022	1,506	65%	35%
Ipsos-Sopra Steria	11–15 Mar 2022	1,651	66%	34%
Ifop-Fiducial	11–15 Mar 2022	1,506	66%	34%
Harris-Interactive	11–14 Mar 2022	2,390	69%	31%
Ipsos-Sopra Steria	10–14 Mar 2022	1,651	67%	33%
Ifop-Fiducial	10–14 Mar 2022	1,507	66%	34%
Ipsos-Sopra Steria	9–12 Mar 2022	1,653	66%	34%
Ifop-Fiducial	8–11 Mar 2022	1,505	65%	35%
Ifop-Fiducial	7–10 Mar 2022	1,505	66%	34%
BVA	8–9 Mar 2022	977	66%	34%
Ifop-Fiducial	5–9 Mar 2022	1,505	66.5%	33.5%
Elabe	7–8 Mar 2022	1,580	69.5%	30.5%
Ifop-Fiducial	4–8 Mar 2022	1,505	65.5%	34.5%
Harris-Interactive	4–7 Mar 2022	2,394	67%	33%
Ifop-Fiducial	3–7 Mar 2022	1,506	64%	36%
OpinionWay-Kéa	1–4 Mar 2022	1,624	65%	35%
Ifop-Fiducial	1–4 Mar 2022	1,504	64.5%	35.5%
Ipsos	2–3 Mar 2022	3,599	65%	35%
OpinionWay-Kéa	28 Feb–3 Mar 2022	1,608	64%	36%
Ifop-Fiducial	28 Feb–3 Mar 2022	1,508	63%	37%
BVA	1–2 Mar 2022	1,500	65%	35%
OpinionWay-Kéa	27 Feb–2 Mar 2022	1,642	63%	37%
Ifop-Fiducial	26 Feb–2 Mar 2022	1,505	63%	37%
OpinionWay-Kéa	26 Feb–1 Mar 2022	1,651	62%	38%
Ifop-Fiducial	25 Feb–1 Mar 2022	1,504	63%	37%
Elabe	27–28 Feb 2022	1,431	65.5%	34.5%
Harris-Interactive	25–28 Feb 2022	2,311	63%	37%
OpinionWay-Kéa	25–28 Feb 2022	1,656	62%	38%
Ifop-Fiducial	24–28 Feb 2022	1,504	64%	36%
Ipsos	24–27 Feb 2022	13,651	63%	37%
OpinionWay-Kéa	22–25 Feb 2022	1,598	62%	38%
Ifop-Fiducial	22–25 Feb 2022	1,503	62%	38%
OpinionWay-Kéa	21–24 Feb 2022	1,603	63%	37%
Ifop-Fiducial	21–24 Feb 2022	1,502	61%	39%
OpinionWay-Kéa	20–23 Feb 2022	1,639	62%	38%
Ifop-Fiducial	19–23 Feb 2022	1,502	61.5%	38.5%
Elabe	21–22 Feb 2022	1,490	66%	34%
OpinionWay-Kéa	19–22 Feb 2022	1,633	62%	38%
Ifop-Fiducial	18–22 Feb 2022	1,501	62%	38%
Harris-Interactive	18–21 Feb 2022	2,457	62%	38%
OpinionWay-Kéa	18–21 Feb 2022	1,638	63%	37%
Ifop-Fiducial	17–21 Feb 2022	1,502	62.5%	37.5%
OpinionWay	15–18 Feb 2022	1,597	60%	40%
Ifop-Fiducial	15–18 Feb 2022	1,505	62%	38%
OpinionWay-Kéa	14–17 Feb 2022	1,578	61%	39%
Ifop-Fiducial	14–17 Feb 2022	1,505	62%	38%
Odoxa	15–16 Feb 2022	2,010	66%	34%
Elabe	14–16 Feb 2022	1,449	64%	36%
OpinionWay-Kéa	13–16 Feb 2022	1,604	61%	39%
Ifop-Fiducial	12–16 Feb 2022	1,504	61%	39%
OpinionWay	12–15 Feb 2022	1,746	62%	38%
Ifop-Fiducial	11–15 Feb 2022	1,503	61%	39%
Harris-Interactive	11–14 Feb 2022	2,476	64%	36%
OpinionWay-Kéa	11–14 Feb 2022	1,646	62%	38%
Ifop-Fiducial	10–14 Feb 2022	1,503	61.5%	38.5%
OpinionWay	8–11 Feb 2022	1,615	62%	38%
Ifop-Fiducial	8–11 Feb 2022	1,503	61%	39%
OpinionWay-Kéa	7–10 Feb 2022	1,648	62%	38%
BVA	7–9 Feb 2022	1,505	62%	38%
OpinionWay-Kéa	6–9 Feb 2022	1,669	61%	39%
Elabe	7–8 Feb 2022	1,488	64%	36%
OpinionWay-Kéa	5–8 Feb 2022	1,658	61%	39%
Harris-Interactive	4–7 Feb 2022	2,421	63%	37%
OpinionWay-Kéa	4–7 Feb 2022	1,630	62%	38%
Ipsos-Sopra Steria	3–7 Feb 2022	12,499	62%	38%
OpinionWay-Kéa	1–4 Feb 2022	1,609	62%	38%
Ipsos	1–3 Feb 2022	1,535	61%	39%
OpinionWay-Kéa	31 Jan–3 Feb 2022	1,609	61%	39%
Elabe	31 Jan–2 Feb 2022	1,482	64.5%	35.5%
OpinionWay-Kéa	30 Jan–2 Feb 2022	1,639	60%	40%
OpinionWay-Kéa	29 Jan–1 Feb 2022	1,666	61%	39%
Harris-Interactive	28–31 Jan 2022	2,562	62%	38%
OpinionWay-Kéa	28–31 Jan 2022	1,655	62%	38%
OpinionWay-Kéa	25–28 Jan 2022	1,568	65%	35%
OpinionWay-Kéa	24–27 Jan 2022	1,567	62%	38%
OpinionWay-Kéa	23–26 Jan 2022	1,629	63%	37%
OpinionWay-Kéa	22–25 Jan 2022	1,634	62%	38%
Harris-Interactive	21–24 Jan 2022	2,496	63%	37%
OpinionWay-Kéa	21–24 Jan 2022	1,650	63%	37%
OpinionWay-Kéa	18–21 Jan 2022	1,613	64%	36%
OpinionWay-Kéa	17–20 Jan 2022	1,603	62%	38%
OpinionWay-Kéa	16–19 Jan 2022	1,626	62%	38%
OpinionWay-Kéa	15–18 Jan 2022	1,624	64%	36%
OpinionWay-Kéa	15–17 Jan 2022	1,093	66%	34%
Harris-Interactive	14–17 Jan 2022	2,599	63%	37%
OpinionWay-Kéa	11–14 Jan 2022	1,577	65%	35%
OpinionWay-Kéa	10–13 Jan 2022	1,575	64%	36%
OpinionWay-Kéa	9–12 Jan 2022	1,604	62%	38%
Elabe	10–11 Jan 2022	1,465	63%	37%
OpinionWay-Kéa	8–11 Jan 2022	1,613	63%	37%
Harris-Interactive	7–10 Jan 2022	2,600	61%	39%
OpinionWay-Kéa	7–10 Jan 2022	1,644	64%	36%
OpinionWay-Kéa	4–7 Jan 2022	1,561	63%	37%
OpinionWay-Kéa	3–6 Jan 2022	1,534	65%	35%
Ifop-Fiducial	3–5 Jan 2022	1,332	63%	37%
OpinionWay-Kéa	2–5 Jan 2022	1,501	65%	35%
OpinionWay-Kéa	2–4 Jan 2022	1,568	64%	36%
OpinionWay-Kéa	2–3 Jan 2022	1,059	65%	35%
Harris-Interactive	28–31 Dec 2021	2,562	62%	38%
OpinionWay	21–22 Dec 2021	1,048	66%	34%
Elabe	17–20 Dec 2021	1,455	67%	33%
Harris-Interactive	10–13 Dec 2021	2,613	62%	38%
Ifop-Fiducial	4–6 Dec 2021	1,341	63%	37%
Harris-Interactive	3–6 Dec 2021	2,613	62%	38%
Harris-Interactive	26–29 Nov 2021	2,601	60%	40%
Harris-Interactive	19–22 Nov 2021	2,624	59%	41%
Harris-Interactive	12–15 Nov 2021	2,609	59%	41%
Elabe	10–11 Nov 2021	1,484	65%	35%
Harris-Interactive	5–8 Nov 2021	2,569	58%	42%
Ifop-Fiducial	3–5 Nov 2021	1,358	59%	41%
Harris-Interactive	1–2 Nov 2021	2,505	57%	43%
Elabe	25–27 Oct 2021	1,300	61%	38%
Harris-Interactive	22–25 Oct 2021	2,497	58%	42%
Harris-Interactive	15–18 Oct 2021	2,544	57%	43%
Ifop	14–15 Oct 2021	1,516	60%	40%
Harris-Interactive	8–11 Oct 2021	1,337	57%	43%
Elabe	5–6 Oct 2021	1,309	63%	37%
Harris-Interactive	1–4 Oct 2021	1,310	55%	45%

==== Macron vs. Pécresse ====
===== Graphical summary =====
Local regression of polls conducted since 2021

Polling firm	Fieldwork date	Sample size		
Polling firm	Fieldwork date	Sample size	Macron LREM	Pécresse LR
Harris-Interactive	7–8 Apr 2022	1,889	65%	35%
Ifop-Fiducial	5–8 Apr 2022	3,016	64%	36%
Ifop-Fiducial	4–7 Apr 2022	3,010	64%	36%
YouGov	4–7 Apr 2022	1,783	67%	33%
AtlasIntel	4–6 Apr 2022	1,946	65.9%	34.1%
Ifop-Fiducial	2–6 Apr 2022	3,010	64%	36%
Ifop-Fiducial	1–5 Apr 2022	3,007	63.5%	36.5%
Harris-Interactive	1–4 Apr 2022	2,531	62%	38%
Ifop-Fiducial	31 Mar–4 Apr 2022	3,008	64%	36%
Ifop-Fiducial	29 Mar–1 Apr 2022	2,994	65%	35%
YouGov	28–31 Mar 2022	1,434	70%	30%
Ifop-Fiducial	28–31 Mar 2022	2,995	64.5%	35.5%
Ifop-Fiducial	26–30 Mar 2022	2,494	64%	36%
Ifop-Fiducial	25–29 Mar 2022	2,004	63.5%	36.5%
Harris-Interactive	25–28 Mar 2022	2,384	67%	33%
Ifop-Fiducial	25–28 Mar 2022	1,501	63%	37%
Ifop-Fiducial	22–25 Mar 2022	1,504	63%	37%
Ifop-Fiducial	21–24 Mar 2022	1,505	63%	37%
Ifop-Fiducial	19–23 Mar 2022	1,507	63%	37%
Ifop-Fiducial	18–22 Mar 2022	1,506	63.5%	36.5%
Harris-Interactive	18–21 Mar 2022	2,344	66%	34%
Ifop-Fiducial	17–21 Mar 2022	1,508	63%	37%
Ipsos-Sopra Steria	15–18 Mar 2022	1,684	67%	33%
Ifop-Fiducial	15–18 Mar 2022	1,507	64%	36%
Ipsos-Sopra Steria	14–17 Mar 2022	1,650	66%	34%
Ifop-Fiducial	14–17 Mar 2022	1,506	63%	37%
Ifop-Fiducial	12–16 Mar 2022	1,506	63%	37%
Ifop-Fiducial	11–15 Mar 2022	1,506	63%	37%
Harris-Interactive	11–14 Mar 2022	2,390	68%	32%
Ipsos-Sopra Steria	10–14 Mar 2022	1,651	63%	37%
Ifop-Fiducial	10–14 Mar 2022	1,507	63%	37%
Ifop-Fiducial	8–11 Mar 2022	1,505	62.5%	37.5%
Ifop-Fiducial	7–10 Mar 2022	1,505	62%	38%
BVA	8–9 Mar 2022	977	64%	36%
Ifop-Fiducial	5–9 Mar 2022	1,505	62%	38%
Ifop-Fiducial	4–8 Mar 2022	1,505	61.5%	38.5%
Harris-Interactive	4–7 Mar 2022	2,394	67%	33%
Ifop-Fiducial	3–7 Mar 2022	1,506	61%	39%
OpinionWay-Kéa	1–4 Mar 2022	1,624	59%	41%
Ifop-Fiducial	1–4 Mar 2022	1,504	60.5%	39.5%
Ipsos	2–3 Mar 2022	3,599	64%	36%
OpinionWay-Kéa	28 Feb–3 Mar 2022	1,608	58%	42%
Ifop-Fiducial	28 Feb–3 Mar 2022	1,508	60%	40%
BVA	1–2 Mar 2022	1,500	61%	39%
OpinionWay-Kéa	27 Feb–2 Mar 2022	1,642	57%	43%
Ifop-Fiducial	26 Feb–2 Mar 2022	1,505	61%	39%
OpinionWay-Kéa	26 Feb–1 Mar 2022	1,651	56%	44%
Ifop-Fiducial	25 Feb–1 Mar 2022	1,504	60.5%	39.5%
Harris-Interactive	25–28 Feb 2022	2,311	61%	39%
OpinionWay-Kéa	25–28 Feb 2022	1,656	56%	44%
Ifop-Fiducial	24–28 Feb 2022	1,504	59.5%	40.5%
Ipsos	24–27 Feb 2022	13,651	59%	41%
OpinionWay-Kéa	22–25 Feb 2022	1,598	55%	45%
Ifop-Fiducial	22–25 Feb 2022	1,503	58%	42%
OpinionWay-Kéa	21–24 Feb 2022	1,603	56%	44%
Ifop-Fiducial	21–24 Feb 2022	1,502	57.5%	42.5%
OpinionWay-Kéa	20–23 Feb 2022	1,639	56%	44%
Ifop-Fiducial	19–23 Feb 2022	1,502	58%	42%
OpinionWay-Kéa	19–22 Feb 2022	1,633	55%	45%
Ifop-Fiducial	18–22 Feb 2022	1,501	57%	43%
Harris-Interactive	18–21 Feb 2022	2,457	57%	43%
OpinionWay-Kéa	18–21 Feb 2022	1,638	55%	45%
Ifop-Fiducial	17–21 Feb 2022	1,502	56%	44%
OpinionWay-Kéa	15–18 Feb 2022	1,597	54%	46%
Ifop-Fiducial	15–18 Feb 2022	1,505	56%	44%
OpinionWay-Kéa	14–17 Feb 2022	1,578	54%	46%
Ifop-Fiducial	14–17 Feb 2022	1,505	56%	44%
Odoxa	15–16 Feb 2022	2,010	59%	41%
Elabe	14–16 Feb 2022	1,449	58%	42%
OpinionWay-Kéa	13–16 Feb 2022	1,604	54%	46%
Ifop-Fiducial	12–16 Feb 2022	1,504	56%	44%
OpinionWay-Kéa	12–15 Feb 2022	1,746	54%	46%
Ifop-Fiducial	11–15 Feb 2022	1,503	56.5%	43.5%
Harris-Interactive	11–14 Feb 2022	2,476	57%	43%
OpinionWay-Kéa	11–14 Feb 2022	1,646	54%	46%
Ifop-Fiducial	10–14 Feb 2022	1,503	56.5%	43.5%
OpinionWay-Kéa	8–11 Feb 2022	1,615	53%	47%
Ifop-Fiducial	8–11 Feb 2022	1,503	56%	44%
OpinionWay-Kéa	7–10 Feb 2022	1,648	53%	47%
Ifop-Fiducial	7–10 Feb 2022	1,502	55%	45%
BVA	7–9 Feb 2022	1,505	56%	44%
OpinionWay-Kéa	6–9 Feb 2022	1,669	53%	47%
Ifop-Fiducial	5–9 Feb 2022	1,504	54.5%	45.5%
Elabe	7–8 Feb 2022	1,488	54%	46%
OpinionWay-Kéa	5–8 Feb 2022	1,658	53%	47%
Ifop-Fiducial	4–8 Feb 2022	1,504	54.5%	45.5%
Harris-Interactive	4–7 Feb 2022	2,421	55%	45%
OpinionWay-Kéa	4–7 Feb 2022	1,630	54%	46%
Ifop-Fiducial	3–7 Feb 2022	1,504	55%	45%
Ipsos-Sopra Steria	3–7 Feb 2022	12,499	54%	46%
OpinionWay-Kéa	1–4 Feb 2022	1,609	53%	47%
Ifop-Fiducial	1–4 Feb 2022	1,503	56%	44%
Ipsos	1–3 Feb 2022	1,535	53%	47%
OpinionWay-Kéa	31 Jan–3 Feb 2022	1,609	53%	47%
Ifop-Fiducial	31 Jan–3 Feb 2022	1,504	55%	45%
Elabe	31 Jan–2 Feb 2022	1,482	55.5%	44.5%
OpinionWay-Kéa	30 Jan–2 Feb 2022	1,639	52%	48%
Ifop-Fiducial	29 Jan–2 Feb 2022	1,503	54%	46%
OpinionWay-Kéa	29 Jan–1 Feb 2022	1,666	52%	48%
Ifop-Fiducial	29 Jan–1 Feb 2022	1,504	53%	47%
Harris-Interactive	28–31 Jan 2022	2,562	54%	46%
OpinionWay-Kéa	28–31 Jan 2022	1,655	52%	48%
Ifop-Fiducial	27–31 Jan 2022	1,503	54%	46%
OpinionWay-Kéa	25–28 Jan 2022	1,568	53%	47%
Ifop-Fiducial	25–28 Jan 2022	1,503	54.5%	45.5%
OpinionWay-Kéa	24–27 Jan 2022	1,567	53%	47%
Ifop-Fiducial	24–27 Jan 2022	1,504	54.5%	45.5%
Elabe	24–26 Jan 2022	1,508	52%	48%
OpinionWay-Kéa	23–26 Jan 2022	1,629	54%	46%
Ifop-Fiducial	22–26 Jan 2022	1,505	54.5%	45.5%
OpinionWay-Kéa	22–25 Jan 2022	1,634	54%	46%
Ifop-Fiducial	21–25 Jan 2022	1,504	54.5%	45.5%
Harris-Interactive	21–24 Jan 2022	2,496	54%	46%
OpinionWay-Kéa	21–24 Jan 2022	1,650	54%	46%
Ifop-Fiducial	20–24 Jan 2022	1,507	55%	45%
OpinionWay-Kéa	18–21 Jan 2022	1,613	53%	47%
Ifop-Fiducial	18–21 Jan 2022	1,507	55%	45%
OpinionWay-Kéa	17–20 Jan 2022	1,603	53%	47%
Ifop-Fiducial	17–20 Jan 2022	1,505	54.5%	45.5%
OpinionWay-Kéa	16–19 Jan 2022	1,626	54%	46%
Ifop-Fiducial	15–19 Jan 2022	1,504	54%	46%
OpinionWay-Kéa	15–18 Jan 2022	1,624	54%	46%
Ifop-Fiducial	14–18 Jan 2022	1,514	53%	47%
OpinionWay-Kéa	15–17 Jan 2022	1,093	54%	46%
Ipsos	14–17 Jan 2022	12,542	54%	46%
Harris-Interactive	14–17 Jan 2022	2,599	54%	46%
Ifop-Fiducial	13–17 Jan 2022	1,517	53%	47%
OpinionWay-Kéa	11–14 Jan 2022	1,577	54%	46%
Ifop-Fiducial	11–14 Jan 2022	1,511	53.5%	46.5%
OpinionWay-Kéa	10–13 Jan 2022	1,575	54%	46%
Ifop-Fiducial	10–13 Jan 2022	1,509	53.5%	46.5%
OpinionWay-Kéa	9–12 Jan 2022	1,604	54%	46%
Ifop-Fiducial	8–12 Jan 2022	1,505	53.5%	46.5%
Elabe	10–11 Jan 2022	1,465	50%	50%
OpinionWay-Kéa	8–11 Jan 2022	1,613	54%	46%
Ifop-Fiducial	7–11 Jan 2022	1,504	53%	47%
Harris-Interactive	7–10 Jan 2022	2,600	52%	48%
OpinionWay-Kéa	7–10 Jan 2022	1,644	54%	46%
Ifop-Fiducial	6–10 Jan 2022	1,502	54%	46%
OpinionWay-Kéa	4–7 Jan 2022	1,561	52%	48%
Ipsos	5–6 Jan 2022	1,500	55%	45%
OpinionWay-Kéa	3–6 Jan 2022	1,534	52%	48%
Ifop-Fiducial	3–5 Jan 2022	1,332	55%	45%
OpinionWay-Kéa	2–5 Jan 2022	1,501	53%	47%
OpinionWay-Kéa	2–4 Jan 2022	1,568	53%	47%
OpinionWay-Kéa	2–3 Jan 2022	1,059	54%	46%
Harris-Interactive	28–31 Dec 2021	2,550	51%	49%
Elabe	17–20 Dec 2021	1,455	51%	49%
OpinionWay	13–15 Dec 2021	1,470	54%	46%
Harris-Interactive	10–13 Dec 2021	2,613	51%	49%
Odoxa	7–9 Dec 2021	2,010	51%	49%
Elabe	6–7 Dec 2021	1,474	48%	52%
Ifop-Fiducial	4–6 Dec 2021	1,341	52%	48%
Harris-Interactive	3–6 Dec 2021	2,613	53%	47%
Harris-Interactive	26–29 Nov 2021	2,601	59%	41%
Harris-Interactive	19–22 Nov 2021	2,624	58%	42%
Harris-Interactive	12–15 Nov 2021	2,609	58%	42%
Harris-Interactive	5–8 Nov 2021	2,569	57%	43%
Ifop-Fiducial	3–5 Nov 2021	1,358	55%	45%
Harris-Interactive	28–30 Oct 2021	2,505	57%	43%
Harris-Interactive	22–25 Oct 2021	2,497	58%	42%
Harris-Interactive	15–18 Oct 2021	2,544	57%	43%
Harris-Interactive	8–11 Oct 2021	1,337	56%	44%
Harris-Interactive	1–4 Oct 2021	1,310	57%	43%
Ifop	29 Sep–1 Oct 2021	1,351	59%	41%
Ifop	31 Aug–2 Sep 2021	1,334	50%	50%

=== Polls involving withdrawn candidates ===
The head-to-head polls below included Xavier Bertrand, before he failed to secure his party's nomination at the 2021 The Republicans congress.

==== Macron vs. Bertrand ====
This graph shows all polls conducted by Harris Interactive since October 2021.

Polling firm	Fieldwork date	Sample size		
Polling firm	Fieldwork date	Sample size	Macron LREM	Bertrand LR
Harris-Interactive	19–22 Nov 2021	2,624	54%	46%
Harris-Interactive	26–29 Nov 2021	2,601	55%	45%
Harris-Interactive	12–15 Nov 2021	2,609	54%	46%
Elabe	10–11 Nov 2021	1,484	55%	45%
Harris-Interactive	5–8 Nov 2021	2,569	55%	45%
Ifop-Fiducial	3–5 Nov 2021	1,358	51%	49%
Harris-Interactive	28–30 Oct 2021	2,505	54%	46%
Harris-Interactive	22–25 Oct 2021	2,497	54%	46%
Harris-Interactive	15–18 Oct 2021	2,544	53%	47%
Ifop-Fiducial	14–15 Oct 2021	1,516	50%	50%
Harris-Interactive	8–11 Oct 2021	1,337	52%	48%
Elabe	5–6 Oct 2021	1,309	53%	47%
Harris-Interactive	1–4 Oct 2021	1,310	51%	49%
Ifop	29 Sep–1 Oct 2021	1,351	51%	49%
Odoxa	20–23 Sep 2021	1,005	53%	47%
Elabe	11–13 Sep 2021	1,320	52%	48%
Ifop	31 Aug–2 Sep 2021	1,334	47%	53%
Ifop	29 Jun–2 Jul 2021	1,337	48%	52%
Ifop	18–20 May 2021	1,363	51%	49%
Ipsos	9–15 Apr 2021	10,000	52%	48%

==== Bertrand vs. Le Pen ====
Polling firm	Fieldwork date	Sample size	Abs.		
Polling firm	Fieldwork date	Sample size	Abs.	Bertrand LR	Le Pen RN
Ifop	29 Sep–1 Oct 2021	1,351	–	62%	38%
Ifop	31 Aug–2 Sep 2021	1,334	–	60%	40%
Ifop	29 Jun–2 Jul 2021	1,337	–	61%	39%
Ifop	18–20 May 2021	1,363	–	60%	40%
Ipsos	9–15 Apr 2021	10,000	24%	61%	39%
Ifop	10 Apr 2021	1,730	–	59%	41%
Ifop	5–11 Mar 2021	2,254	–	57%	43%
