= 2017 French presidential election =

Election of Emmanuel Macron

- 23 April 2017 (first round); 7 May 2017 (second round)
- Opinion polls
- Turnout: 77.77% (first round) ▼1.71pp 74.56% (second round) ▼5.79pp
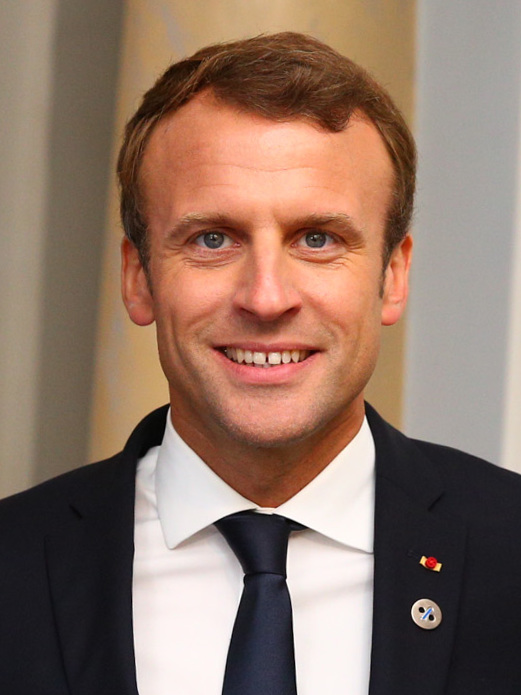

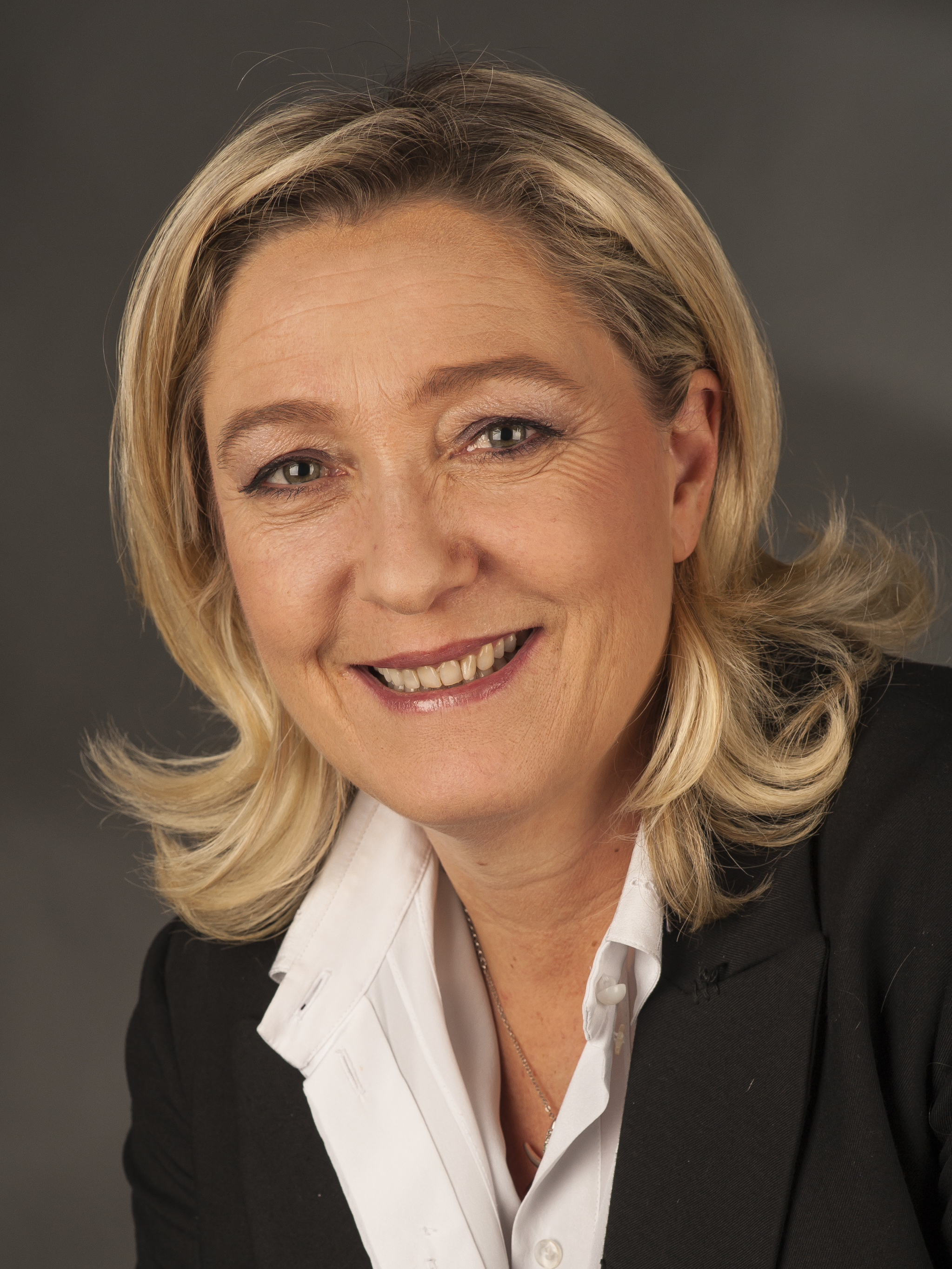
Nominee	Emmanuel Macron	Marine Le Pen
Party	EM	FN
Popular vote	20,743,128	10,638,475
Percentage	66.10%	33.90%
President before election
François Hollande
PS
Elected President
Emmanuel Macron
EM

Presidential elections were held in France on 23 April and 7 May 2017. Incumbent president François Hollande of the Socialist Party (PS) was eligible to run for a second term, but declared on 1 December 2016 that he would not seek reelection in light of low approval ratings, making him the first incumbent head of state of the Fifth Republic not to seek reelection. As no candidate won a majority in the first round, a runoff was held between the top two candidates, Emmanuel Macron of En Marche! (EM) and Marine Le Pen of the National Front (FN), which Macron won with a difference of more than 30% of the vote.

François Fillon of The Republicans (LR)—after winning the party's first open primary—and Le Pen of the National Front led first-round opinion polls in November 2016 and mid-January 2017. Polls tightened considerably by late January; after the publication of revelations that Fillon employed family members in possibly fictitious jobs in a series of politico-financial affairs that came to be colloquially known as "Penelopegate", Macron overtook Fillon to place consistently second in first-round polling. At the same time, Benoît Hamon won the Socialist primary, entering fourth place in the polls. After strong debate performances, Jean-Luc Mélenchon of La France Insoumise (FI) rose significantly in polls in late March, overtaking Hamon to place just below Fillon.

The first round was held under a state of emergency that was declared following the November 2015 Paris attacks. Following the result of the first round, Macron and Le Pen continued to the 7 May runoff. It was the first time since 2002 that a National Front candidate continued to the second round and the first time in the history of the Fifth Republic that the runoff did not include a nominee of the traditional left or right parties; their combined share of the vote from eligible voters, at approximately 26%, was also a historic low.

Estimations of the result of the second round on 7 May indicated that Macron had been elected by a decisive margin; Le Pen immediately conceded defeat. After the Interior Ministry published preliminary results, the official result of the second round was proclaimed by the Constitutional Council on 10 May. Overall, 43.6% of the registered electorate voted for Macron; in 2002, by contrast, two-thirds of eligible voters voted against then-FN candidate Jean-Marie Le Pen. When Macron took office on 14 May, he became the youngest holder of the presidency in French history and the youngest French head of state since Napoleon. He named Édouard Philippe as Prime Minister the next day. The initial government was assembled on 17 May; legislative elections on 11 and 18 June gave En Marche! a substantial majority.

== Background ==
The President of the French Republic and French Co-Prince of Andorra is elected to a five-year term in a two-round election under Article 7 of the Constitution: if no candidate secures an absolute majority of votes in the first round, a second round is held two weeks later between the two candidates who received the most votes. In 2017, the first and second rounds were held 23 April and 7 May.

Each presidential candidate must meet a specific set of requirements in order to run. They must be a French citizen of at least 18 years old. It is also necessary for candidates to be on an electoral roll, proving their eligibility to vote.

To be listed on the first-round ballot, candidates must secure 500 signatures (often referred to as parrainages) from national or local elected officials from at least 30 different departments or overseas collectivities, with no more than a tenth of these signatories from any single department. The official signature collection period followed the publication of the Journal officiel on 25 February to 17 March. The collection period had initially been scheduled to begin on 23 February, but a visit by Prime Minister Bernard Cazeneuve to China on that date forced a delay. French prefectures mailed sponsorship forms to the 42,000 elected officials eligible to give their signature to a candidate, which must then be delivered to the Constitutional Council for validation. Unlike in previous years, a list of validated signatures was posted on Tuesday and Thursday of every week on the council's website; in the past, signatories were published only after the official candidate list had been verified after the end of the collection period. The end of the signature collection period also marked the deadline for the declaration of personal assets required of prospective candidates. The final list of candidates was declared on 21 March.

Speaking time of candidates and supporters from 1 February to 10 April recorded by the CSA
Fillon	300h58
Hamon	255h51
Macron	234h03
Le Pen	229h02
Mélenchon	160h36
Dupont-Aignan	44h00
Others	82h33

The Conseil supérieur de l'audiovisuel (CSA) ensured that all candidates receive equal time in broadcast media "under comparable programming conditions" from 19 March onward. The CSA warned on 8 March that the amount of speaking time broadcasters had given Fillon and his supporters was "unusually high", even given the unusual circumstances surrounding his candidacy. After the official start of the campaign on 10 April, the CSA strictly enforced equal time in broadcast media. Campaigning for the first round of the election ended at midnight on 21 April, two days before the vote. The Constitutional Council verified the results of the first round between the 24–26 April and officially certified the vote tallies on 26 April, with the same procedure being used for the second round. The new President of the French Republic was set to be proclaimed on 11 May and undergo their investiture ceremony on 14 May at the latest.

== Candidates ==
On 18 March 2017, the Constitutional Council published the names of the 11 candidates who received 500 valid sponsorships, with the order of the list determined by drawing lots.

Candidate name and age, political party		Political office(s)	Campaign logo	Details
Nicolas Dupont-Aignan (56); Debout la France (DLF)	Nicolas Dupont-Aignan	President of Debout la France (since 2008); Deputy for Essonne (since 1997); Mayor of Yerres (1995–2017)	Logo of Nicolas Dupont-Aignan	A former member of the RPR, RPF and UMP, Dupont-Aignan left the latter party on the eve of the 2007 presidential election due to disagreements with Nicolas Sarkozy. He subsequently founded the sovereignist political party Debout la République (DLR), which was later renamed Debout la France (DLF) in 2014. He previously stood as a candidate in the 2012 presidential election, in which he garnered 1.79% of the vote in the first round. Claiming the mantle of Gaullism, he sought to position himself between Le Pen and Fillon. Five days after his elimination in the first round, he announced his support for Le Pen in the second round.
Marine Le Pen (48); National Front (FN)	Marine Le Pen	President of the National Front (2011–2017); MEP for North-West France (2004–2017)	Logo of Marine Le Pen	Main article: 2017 Marine Le Pen presidential campaign When Le Pen, a lawyer by occupation, stood in the 2012 presidential election, she came in third with 17.90% of first-round votes. She rose within the ranks of the National Front (FN), founded and previously led by her father Jean-Marie Le Pen, culminating in a bitter leadership struggle which she won in 2011. Her campaign programme prioritised the national interests of France and an exit from the eurozone, emphasising her party's traditional concern about security and immigration, as well as socioeconomic issues and the sovereignty of the French state, on matters of currency, borders, the economy and rule of law. Her campaign was punctuated by judicial inquiries into her party and personal associates.
Emmanuel Macron (39); En Marche! (EM)		President of En Marche! (2016–2017); Minister of the Economy, Industry and Digital Affairs (2014–2016)	Logo of En Marche!	The youngest candidate in the race and a former cabinet member who had never run for elected office, Macron described himself as "neither of the right nor the left". He was appointed deputy Secretary-General of the Élysée in 2012 and became Economy Minister in 2014, lending his name to the "Macron law" to promote economic growth and opportunities. He founded the En Marche! movement in April 2016 before resigning from the cabinet on 30 August. The most explicitly pro-European of the candidates, Macron intends to implement reforms to modernize the French economy. Macron secured support across the political spectrum, but primarily among liberal-leaning figures; notable supporters include perennial centrist candidate François Bayrou, president of the Democratic Movement (MoDem), as well as Minister of Defence Jean-Yves Le Drian.
Benoît Hamon (49); Socialist Party (PS)	Benoît Hamon	Deputy for Yvelines (2012 and 2014–2017) Other offices: Minister of National Education, Higher Education and Research in 2014; Deputy Minister of the Economy and Finance responsible for Consumer Affairs and the Social and Solidarity Economy from 2012 to 2014; Deputy Minister of the Economy, Finance and Foreign Trade responsible for the Social and Solidarity Economy in 2012; MEP for East France from 2004 to 2009	Logo of Benoît Hamon	Hamon, a left-wing critic of Hollande's policies, was the surprise winner of the Socialist primary in January 2017, defeating former Prime Minister Manuel Valls. Hamon's primary victory was driven in part by his support for a universal basic income, which remained integral to his program. He negotiated the withdrawal and support of Yannick Jadot of Europe Ecology – The Greens (EELV) in February, becoming the joint candidate of both parties. He also advocated for the legalization of cannabis and reforming the structure of government to a "Sixth Republic". He endorsed Emmanuel Macron in the second round.
Nathalie Arthaud (47); Workers' Struggle (LO)	Nathalie Arthaud	Spokeswoman of Lutte Ouvrière (since 2008)		Arthaud first ran for the presidency in the 2012 election under the LO banner, receiving 0.56% of votes in the first round. A professor of economics, she described the objective of her candidacy as being to, "make the workers' voice heard", hoping to "allow workers, the unemployed and exploited to defend their interests, as opposed to [those who pocketed] millions and millions". She claims that she is the only communist candidate, and wants to see borders disappear and overthrow capitalism. She intended to cast a blank vote in the second round.
Philippe Poutou (50); New Anticapitalist Party (NPA)	Philippe Poutou	Spokesperson of the New Anticapitalist Party (since 2009)		A long-time radical left-wing activist, as well as a trade unionist and Ford mechanic in Blanquefort, Poutou led opposition to the shutdown of the local factory. He also ran in the 2012 presidential election, obtaining 1.15% of votes. He launched his political activities at Lutte Ouvrière before joining the Revolutionary Communist League (LCR) which became the NPA in 2009. With Marxist and anarchist roots, he crusades against capitalism and espouses radical-left ideas. He offered no voting instructions to his supporters for the second round.
Jacques Cheminade (75); Solidarity and Progress (S&P)	Jacques Cheminade	President of Solidarity and Progress (since 1996)	Logo of Jacques Cheminade	Cheminade founded Solidarity and Progress in 1996 and is the figurehead of the LaRouche movement in France. He proposes leaving NATO, the EU, the eurozone and returning to the franc. He supports colonisation of the Moon to facilitate exploration of Mars. He was a candidate twice before, in 1995 and 2012, collecting 0.28% and 0.25% of the vote, respectively, but failed to appear on the ballot in 1981, 1988, 2002 and 2007. His position on the second round is unclear, only specifying that he, personally, would not cast a vote for Le Pen while also denouncing the forces of "financial occupation".
Jean Lassalle (61); Résistons!	Jean Lassalle	Deputy for Pyrénées-Atlantiques (since 2002); Mayor of Lourdios-Ichère (since 1977)	Logo of Jean Lassalle	Lassalle, a former member of the Democratic Movement (MoDem) and associate of François Bayrou running under the banner of Résistons!, considered himself the "defender of rural territories and a humanist ecology". He became famous for a successful 39-day hunger strike protesting the movement of the Total factory from Accous to the Lacq basin 65 km (40 mi) away. In 2013, he walked 6,000 km (3,700 mi) on foot to "meet the French". He opted to cast a blank vote in the second round.
Jean-Luc Mélenchon (65); La France Insoumise (FI)	Jean-Luc Mélenchon	MEP for South-West France (2009–2017) Other offices: President, then co-president of the Left Party from 2009 to 2014; Senator for Essonne from 1986 to 2000 and from 2004 to 2010; Deputy Minister of Vocational Education from 2000 to 2002	Logo of Jean-Luc Mélenchon	Denouncing the "liberal drift" of the party, Mélenchon left the PS in 2008 to found the Left Party. He made a previous presidential run in 2012, coming in fourth with 11.10% of votes, with the backing of the French Communist Party (PCF). A critic of the presidency of François Hollande, he launched his 2017 bid without consulting the PCF, instead choosing to start his own movement, La France Insoumise (FI). He later won the PCF's support by a narrow margin. His programme underlined left-wing and environmental principles, including the establishment of a Sixth Republic, redistribution of wealth, renegotiating EU treaties, environmental planning and protecting the independence of France, namely from the United States. He sought a withdrawal from NATO and was largely criticised for refusing to denounce authoritarian leaders, most notably Nicolas Maduro. He ran an innovative campaign, gathering a large following on social media and holding simultaneous meetings in multiple cities via hologram. He intended to consult with his movement before making any pronouncement on the second round. After a few days, he stated that he would not vote for the FN, but never explicitly provided any further voting instructions.
François Asselineau (59); Popular Republican Union (UPR)	François Asselineau	President of the Popular Republican Union (since 2007)	Logo of François Asselineau	A sovereignist, Asselineau surprised political observers with his ability to secure the 500 sponsorships required to stand as a candidate. Formerly of the RPF and UMP, he founded the Popular Republican Union (UPR) in 2007 and has agitated for the French to exit from the EU. Sometimes classified as a far-right Eurosceptic, he has denounced "American imperialism" and proposed leaving NATO. He offered no endorsement in the second round.
François Fillon (63); The Republicans (LR)	François Fillon	Deputy for Paris (2012–2017); Prime Minister (2007–2012) Other offices: Co-president of the Union for a Popular Movement (interim) in 2014; President of the Rassemblement-UMP group in the National Assembly from 2012 to 2013; Minister of Ecology, Sustainable Development, Transport and Housing in 2012; Deputy for Sarthe from 1981 to 1993, from 1997 to 2002 and in 2007; Senator for the Sarthe in 2004 and from 2005 to 2007; Minister of National Education, Higher Education and Research from 2004 to 2005; Minister of Social Affairs, Labour and Solidarity from 2002 to 2004; President of the regional council of Pays de la Loire from 1998 to 2002; Mayor of Sablé-sur-Sarthe from 1983 to 2001; President of the general council of the Sarthe from 1992 to 1998; Deputy Minister responsible for Post, Telecommunications and Space from 1995 to 1997; Minister of Information Technology and Post in 1995; Minister of Higher Education and Research from 1993 to 1995	Logo of François Fillon	Fillon led a prolific political career starting from the early 1970s. The surprise winner of the primary of the right offered a liberal economic program ending the 35-hour workweek, dismissing 500,000 civil servants, abolishing the wealth tax (ISF), streamlining the labour code, and reforming the health insurance system. However, his campaign was hobbled in January 2017 following the publication of allegations of fictitious employment of family members, including his wife, collectively known as "Penelopegate". He initially said he would drop his bid if placed under formal investigation, but continued his candidacy after such investigations began on 15 March. He endorsed Emmanuel Macron in the second round.

=== Sponsorships ===
A candidate must secure 500 signatures from elected officials in order to appear on the first-round ballot, with the signature collection period ending on 17 March. The table below lists sponsorships received by the Constitutional Council by candidate.

Colour legend

1–50	51–100	101–150	151–200	201–250	251–300	301–350	351–400	401–450	451–500	500+

Signatures received by the Constitutional Council as of 18 March
Candidate	Party	1 Mar	3 Mar	7 Mar	10 Mar	14 Mar	18 Mar	Total	Notes
Michèle Alliot-Marie	DVD	4	4	18	12	15	21	74	
Nathalie Arthaud	LO	201	113	243	36	30	14	637	500 signatures validated by 7 March
François Asselineau	UPR	60	0	420	44	45	18	587	500 signatures validated by 10 March
François Baroin	LR	0	0	5	4	18	18	45	Not a candidate
Éric Besson	SE	0	0	0	0	0	1	1	
Jérôme Blanal	SE	0	0	0	0	1	0	1	
Jean-Louis Borloo	UDI	0	0	0	0	2	1	3	Not a candidate
Philippe Bouriachi	EELV	0	0	0	0	0	1	1	Not the nominee of EELV
Renaud Camus	SE	0	0	0	1	0	0	1	
Bernard Cazeneuve	PS	0	0	0	0	1	0	1	Not a candidate
Jacques Cheminade	SP	61	102	207	27	72	59	528	500 signatures validated by 18 March
Daniel Cohn-Bendit	EELV	0	0	0	0	0	1	1	Not a candidate
Robert de Prévoisin	AR	0	0	0	1	0	0	1	
Olivier Delafon	SE	0	0	1	0	0	0	1	
Nicolas Dupont-Aignan	DLF	31	174	354	64	49	35	707	500 signatures validated by 7 March
Bastien Faudot	MRC	3	1	6	8	7	4	29	Withdrew candidacy on 12 March
Bertrand Fessard de Foucault	SE	0	1	0	0	0	0	1	
François Fillon	LR	738	417	634	322	842	682	3,635	500 signatures validated by 1 March
Jean-Pierre Gorges	DVD	1	10	22	13	11	13	70	
Michael Goué	SE	0	0	0	1	0	0	1	Not a candidate
Henri Guaino	DVD	2	3	3	4	5	16	33	
Jean-Paul Guilbert	SE	0	0	0	0	1	0	1	
Stéphane Guyot	SE	0	2	1	1	2	3	9	
Benoît Hamon	PS	184	150	705	278	400	322	2,039	500 signatures validated by 7 March
Laurent Hénart	UDI	0	0	0	0	3	4	7	Not a candidate
François Hollande	PS	0	0	0	0	1	6	7	Not a candidate
Yannick Jadot	EELV	1	1	0	1	0	2	5	Withdrew candidacy to support Benoît Hamon
Alexandre Jardin	SE	7	10	39	8	43	58	165	
Lionel Jospin	PS	0	0	0	0	0	1	1	Not a candidate
Alain Juppé	LR	0	1	241	46	14	11	313	Renounced potential candidacy on 6 March
Patrick Kanner	PS	0	0	0	0	0	1	1	Not a candidate
Nathalie Kosciusko-Morizet	LR	0	0	0	0	0	1	1	Not a candidate
Camille Laine	SE	0	0	0	0	0	1	1	
Pierre Larrouturou	ND	1	4	6	4	10	8	33	
Jean Lassalle	SE	14	56	163	56	164	255	708	500 signatures validated by 18 March
Marine Le Pen	FN	25	59	399	94	41	9	627	500 signatures validated by 10 March
Bruno Le Maire	LR	0	0	0	0	0	1	1	Not a candidate
Jean-Michel Levacher	SE	0	0	0	0	0	1	1	Not a candidate
Emmanuel Macron	EM	229	235	610	192	282	281	1,829	500 signatures validated by 7 March
Charlotte Marchandise	LP	4	3	21	7	36	64	135	
Jean-Claude Martinez	SE	0	1	1	0	1	0	3	
Jean-Luc Mélenchon	FI	87	49	220	76	234	139	805	500 signatures validated by 14 March
Kamel Messaoudi	SE	0	0	0	0	1	2	3	
Nicolas Miguet	RCF	1	3	2	0	2	7	15	
Jean-Luc Millo	SE	0	0	0	1	0	0	1	Self-sponsored
Hervé Morin	LC	0	0	0	0	0	1	1	Not a candidate
Alain Mourguy	SE	0	0	0	0	0	1	1	
Paul Mumbach	SE	2	0	4	3	4	1	14	
Jacques Nikonoff	SE	0	0	3	2	0	1	6	
Régis Passerieux	DVG	0	0	0	0	1	0	1	
Philippe Poutou	NPA	35	1	161	48	112	216	573	500 signatures validated by 18 March
Olivier Régis	SE	0	0	1	1	3	2	7	
Didier Tauzin	SE	4	4	21	12	19	24	84	
Oscar Temaru	TH	1	1	14	20	46	27	109	
Emmanuel Toniutti	SE	0	2	1	0	1	5	9	
Bernard Trambouze	DVG	0	1	0	0	0	0	1	Self-sponsored
Christian Troadec	SE	12	8	15	14	2	2	53	Withdrew candidacy on 6 March
Michel Vergne	SE	0	1	0	1	0	1	3	Non-candidate; sponsored by friend as a joke
Antoine Waechter	MEI	1	0	1	2	2	5	11	
Laurent Wauquiez	LR	0	0	0	0	0	1	1	Not a candidate
Rama Yade	DVD	8	21	84	38	66	136	353	
Total		1,717	1,438	4,626	1,442	2,589	2,484	14,296	

== Non-candidates ==
=== Socialist Party (PS) ===
The 2017 presidential election was the first in the history of the Fifth Republic in which a sitting president did not seek a second term. On 1 December 2016, incumbent president François Hollande, acknowledging his low approval ratings, announced he would not seek a second term. His then-Prime Minister Manuel Valls declared on 5 December 2016 that he would run in the Socialist primary on 22 January 2017, but he was defeated by Benoît Hamon in its second round on 29 January.

=== Democratic Movement (MoDem) ===
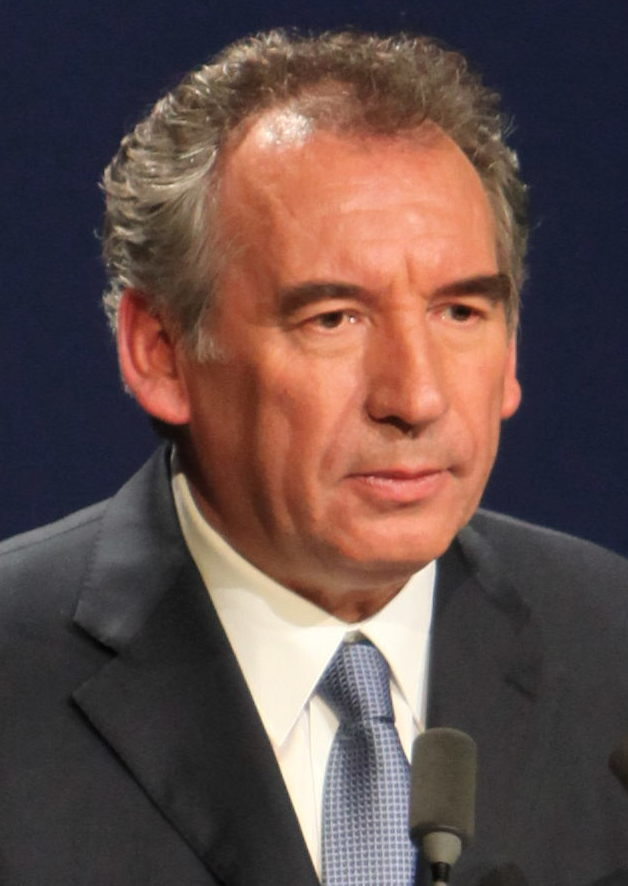
François Bayrou in 2012

François Bayrou, the three-time centrist presidential candidate and leader of the Democratic Movement (MoDem) – who came fourth in 2002, third in 2007, and fifth in 2012 – initially supported the candidacy of Alain Juppé in the primary of the right against his long-time adversary Nicolas Sarkozy, whom he vowed to run against if he won the primary. However, Fillon's victory in the primary – which saw the elimination of Sarkozy in the first round and the defeat of Juppé in the runoff – led Bayrou to reconsider lodging a bid for the presidency, despite his 2014 election promise during his successful mayoral campaign in Pau that he would not seek the presidency if he won. After an extended period of suspense, he finally announced on 22 February that he would not run for a fourth time, instead proposing a conditional alliance with Emmanuel Macron, who accepted his offer.

=== Europe Ecology – The Greens (EELV) ===
On 9 July 2016, Europe Ecology – The Greens (EELV) announced that it would hold a primary election before the 2017 presidential election. Those wishing to be nominated required the support of 36 of its "federal councilors" out of 240; nominations were open to individuals in civic society as well. The vote was open to both party members as well as sympathizers who could register to vote in the primary. The announcement came just days after prominent environmentalist Nicolas Hulot's surprise declaration that he would not offer himself as a presidential candidate on 5 July. EELV were the first party to hold a presidential primary for the 2017 election, with two rounds held on 19 October and 7 November 2016. It was contested by deputy, former Minister of Territorial Equality and Housing, and ex-party leader Cécile Duflot, as well as three MEPs – Karima Delli, Yannick Jadot, and Michèle Rivasi.

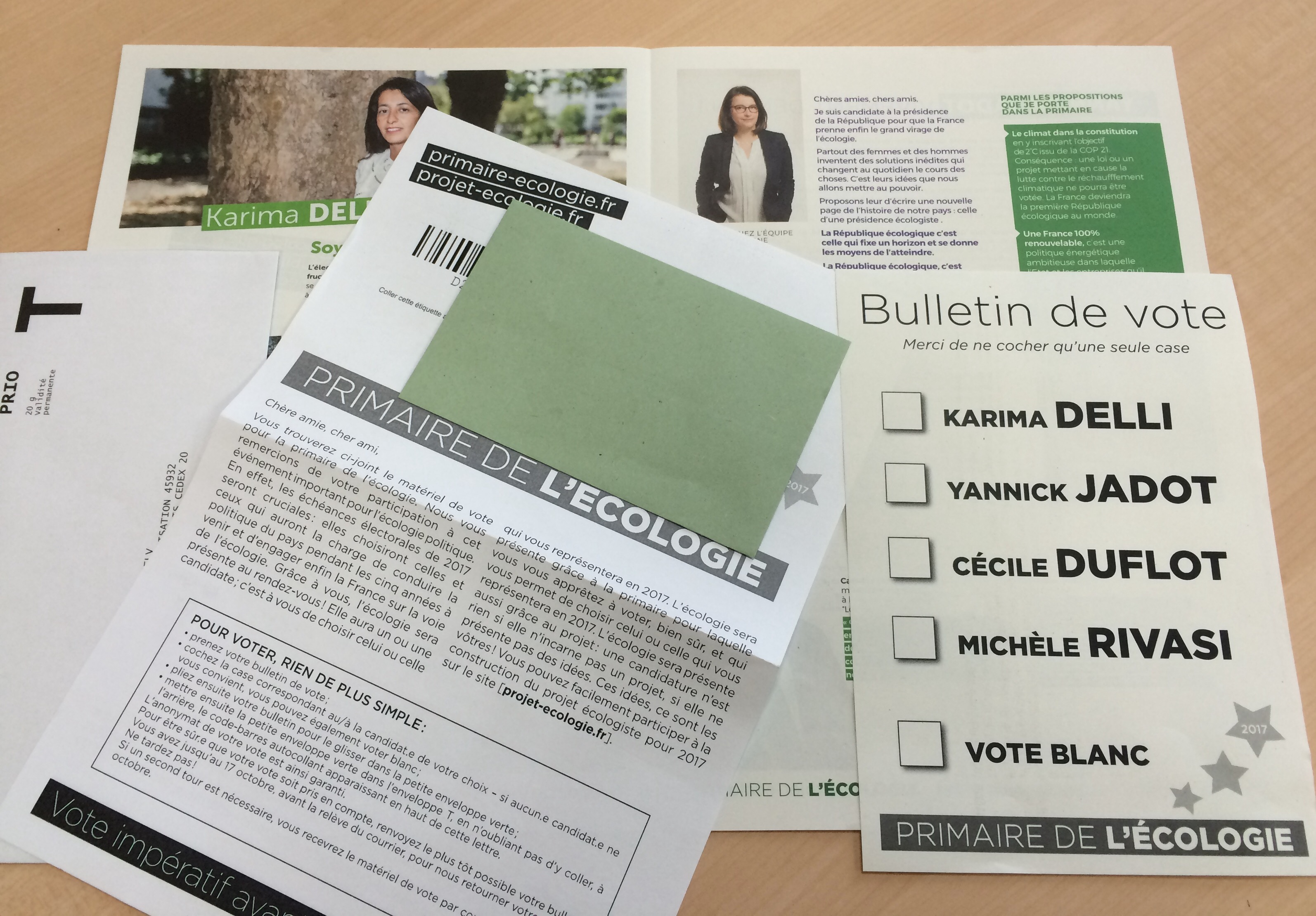
Voting materials for the first round of the ecologist primary

Duflot was considered the early favorite, though she initially opposed holding a primary, aware of the risk that she might lose it; and highlighted her experience in government. Her main proposal was to incorporate the fight against climate change into the Constitution. Jadot was perceived as her main challenger; elected as an MEP in 2009, he worked with Greenpeace France from 2002 to 2008, specializing in transatlantic trade and climate issues. With Thomas Piketty and Daniel Cohn-Bendit, he sought a "primary of all the left", which failed to materialize. He rejected the "candidacy awaited by the political-media world" – that of Duflot, among others – and represented an anti-Duflot force from the party's right wing. Rivasi only barely managed to qualify for the primary, earlier lacking the necessary sponsorships. Like Jadot, she represented the radical wing of the party – albeit on its left flank – and served as deputy for Drôme from 1997 to 2002 and led Greenpeace France from 2003 to 2004. Delli, the daughter of Algerian immigrants, first became involved in politics as part of collective movements, and sought to become an MEP in 2009 after a stint as parliamentary assistant to Marie-Christine Blandin. Also of the party's left-wing, she declared that she would defend a "popular ecology".

Jadot and Rivasi advanced to the runoff after scoring 35.61% and 30.16%, respectively, in the first round; the other two candidates were eliminated, with Duflot garnering 24.41% and Delli 9.82%. Jadot won the second round of the primary on 7 November, obtaining 54.25% of the vote against Rivasi's 40.75%, becoming the nominee of the EELV in the presidential election. Jadot, who claimed 496 sponsorships just before the opening of the collection period, withdrew his candidacy on 23 February and endorsed Hamon, the pair having agreed on a common platform. An online vote among EELV primary voters from 24 and 26 February was required to confirm the agreement; an earlier vote to open talks with Hamon and Mélenchon was approved by 89.7% of those electors. The Hamon–Jadot alliance was consummated on 26 February; among those who cast a vote, 79.53% voted to support it, with 15.39% opposed and 5.08% submitting blank ballots, and an overall voter turnout of 55.25% (9,433 votes). This marks the first election since 1969 without a green candidate.

== Primaries ==
=== The Republicans (LR) ===
Results of the first round by department and region

After his loss as the nominee of the Union for a Popular Movement (UMP) in the 2012 presidential election, ex-president Nicolas Sarkozy pledged to return to being a "Frenchman among the French". However, he announced on 19 September 2014 that he would seek the presidency of the party, a position he secured in an online vote on 29 November online vote with the backing of 64.50% of party members, against his main opponent Bruno Le Maire's 29.18%. He succeeded the triumvirate of Alain Juppé, François Fillon, and Jean-Pierre Raffarin, which assumed the party's leadership after the resignation of Jean-François Copé. Sarkozy was initially reluctant to accept the idea of holding a right-wing primary for the 2017 presidential election, but on 25 September 2014 he declared his support for a primary of the right after a warning from Juppé, who on 20 August made public his intention to run for the nomination.

The rules of the primary were confirmed in April 2015, scheduling the first round of an open primary for 20 November 2016, with a runoff on 27 November if no candidate received more than 50% of the vote. Those wishing to vote were required to pay €2 per ballot and sign a charter indicating their adherence to "Republican values of the right and centre". In order to appear on the ballot, prospective candidates needed to present sponsorships from 250 elected officials from at least 30 departments, with no more than a tenth from the same department, including at least 20 parliamentarians, in addition to the signatures of at least 2,500 party members across at least 15 departments, with no more than a tenth from the same department. The charter permitted other parties wishing to participate to set their own sponsorship requirements. The High Authority ultimately determined that seven candidates qualified to compete in the open primary of the right and centre: Fillon, Juppé, Le Maire, Copé, Sarkozy, and Nathalie Kosciusko-Morizet of the Republicans, the party's name after May 2015, as well as Jean-Frédéric Poisson of the Christian Democratic Party (PCD), who was not required to present signatures as the leader of another party. The National Centre of Independents and Peasants (CNIP) were also allowed to participate, but not to present a candidate.

Results of the second round by department and region

The primary was initially fought primarily between Juppé and Sarkozy, the top two candidates in primary polls. Sarkozy's program emphasized the themes of Islam, immigration, security, and defense. He proposed to end family reunifications and reform the right to birthright citizenship, halt the flow of economic migrants, and increase residence requirements to secure French nationality. He reaffirmed his interest in the "assimilation" of immigrants, and intended to ban other menus for school canteens (i.e., options for Muslim students) as well as Muslim headscarves at universities. Sarkozy also suggested that radical imams be expelled and suspected terrorists be detained by authorities and tried by a special anti-terrorist court, in addition a reduction in the age of criminal responsibility from 18 to 16. He proposed to postpone the increase the retirement age to 64 until 2024, permit exemptions to the 35-hour workweek, cut 300,000 civil service jobs by increasing working hours to 37 per week, and abolish the wealth tax (ISF). Like Le Maire, he did not rule out the possibility of a referendum on the European Union (EU). He also sought a European treaty "refounding", the creation of a European monetary fund, to commit 2% to defense spending by 2025, and to reduce public spending by €100 billion and taxes by €40 billion while reducing the budget deficit to under 3% of GDP.

In contrast to Sarkozy, Juppé spoke of a "happy identity" and emphasized the importance of integration as opposed to assimilation. He supported drawing up a common list of "safe countries" to differentiate refugees from economic migrants, setting a "quota" on immigrants as necessary, and to stop providing foreign aid to countries refusing to comply with their obligation to accept deported citizens. He questioned Sarkozy's proposals on Schengen and instead merely acknowledged that it was not functioning correctly, but concurred with him in exempting the acquisition of French nationality by foreigners at the age of 18 if previously convicted. Juppé also demanded transparency on the funding of places of worship, civic training for imams, and, unlike Sarkozy, favored allowing women to wear the Muslim headscarf at universities. On economic issues, he proposed to end the 35-hour workweek, abolish the wealth tax, reduce corporate taxation, and set the retirement age at 65. He also pledged to slash in half the number of parliamentarians, renegotiate Schengen, and increase defense spending in absolute terms by at least €7 billion by 2022.

After several strong debate performances by Fillon, however, a second-round Juppé–Sarkozy duel no longer appeared inevitable. Fillon's rise was propelled by his proposals for a rigorous economic program. Seeking €100 billion in cuts, he proposed eliminating 500,000 civil service jobs by 2022 and a return to the 39-hour workweek for civil servants. Like the other primary candidates, he planned to eliminate the wealth tax; in addition, Fillon suggested abolishing the 35-hour workweek – capping it at the 48-hour maximum allowed within the EU – and the implementation of other liberal economic measures. He also adopted a staunchly conservative social program, opposing adoption by same-sex couples and arguing France had no religious problem apart from Islam itself. Like Sarkozy, he sought to expand the capacity of French prisons, but unlike his former superior, he opposed banning religious symbols in public places. He also professed a more pro-Russian stance than other candidates, urging cooperation in Syria against the Islamic State and supporting the "pragmatism" of Vladimir Putin's intervention in the Syrian civil war.

The first round of the primary on 20 November saw the unexpected elimination of Sarkozy, with Fillon coming in first with 44.1%, Juppé at 28.6%, and Sarkozy at 20.7% of the vote, and all other candidates far behind. A second round between Fillon and Juppé was confirmed, and Sarkozy announced that he would vote for his former Prime Minister soon after the results became clear. Fillon scored a landslide victory in the 27 November runoff with 66.5% of the vote to Juppé's 33.5% and became the Republicans' nominee; voter turnout – at 4.4 million – was even higher than in the first round.

=== Socialist Party (PS) ===
Results of the first round by department and region

At the 2012 Toulouse Congress, the Socialist Party (PS) modified its statutes to guarantee the selection of a candidate of the left through open primaries, with the National Council of the Socialist Party announcing the timetable and organization of the primaries at least one year beforehand. On 11 January, Libération published an editorial in favor of a "primary of the left and ecologists", and on 9 April the National Council of the Socialist Party unanimously approved the idea of holding such a primary in early December. On 18 June, the National Council finally confirmed that it would organize a primary to select a candidate for the 2017 presidential election. Applications could be submitted from 1 to 15 December, with two rounds of voting planned for 22 and 29 January 2017. Prospective PS candidates were required to sign the primary's charter of ethics requiring candidates to rally behind its winner and to secure the support of 5% of one of the following groups: members of the National Council; Socialist parliamentarians, regional and departmental Socialist councilors in at least 4 regions and 10 departments; or Socialist mayors representing more than 10,000 people in at least 4 regions and 10 departments. The conditions for becoming a candidate of other member parties of the BAP – the PRG, UDE, PE, and Democratic Front (FD) – were determined by the respective parties' leadership.

The EELV declared on 20 June that it would not participate in the primary, and the French Communist Party (PCF) did likewise the following day. After declaring his candidacy for the presidential election, Emmanuel Macron of En Marche! also declined to participate, as did Jean-Luc Mélenchon under the banner of la France Insoumise, saying that he did not want to run in a primary with François Hollande since he would not be able to support Hollande if he won. He later reaffirmed this by saying that with the exclusion of the EELV and PRG the primary was not truly "of the left" but a "primary of the Socialist Party". On 1 December, Hollande declared that he would not seek a second term, becoming the first President of the Fifth Republic to renounce a reelection bid. His announcement reflected his high personal unpopularity and resentment among Socialist colleagues regarding remarks he made about cabinet members and other associates in the book Un président ne devrait pas dire ça... (A president should not say that...) by Gérard Davet and Fabrice Lhomme, journalists at Le Monde.

Results of the second round by department and region

On 17 December, the High Authority declared that seven candidates qualified to appear on the ballot: four from the Socialist Party – former Prime Minister Manuel Valls, Arnaud Montebourg, Benoît Hamon, and Vincent Peillon – and François de Rugy of the PE, Sylvia Pinel of the PRG, and Jean-Luc Bennahmias of the PD. Early opinion polling placed Valls and Montebourg first and second, respectively, with Hamon a close third. Shortly after declaring his candidacy on 5 December, Valls proposed to abolish article 49.3 of the French constitution, a procedure that allows bypassing legislative approval, in a "democratic renaissance"; as Prime Minister, he invoked it on six occasions, using it to pass the Macron and El Khomri laws. He also proposed a 2.5% increase in public spending while keeping the budget deficit under 3%, guaranteeing a "decent income" of €800, reducing the gender pay gap by half, pausing the enlargement of the European Union, appending a charter of secularism to the Constitution, consolidating the nuclear industry, and mandating six months of civic service. He was twice physically attacked during the primary campaign: on 22 December, he was flour-bombed by a protester in Strasbourg saying "we do not forget [the 49.3]!", and on 17 January, he was slapped by a young Breton regionalist in Lamballe, who was subsequently charged.

Former Minister of the Economy Arnaud Montebourg, a Socialist rebel known for promoting "made in France", presented a firmly left-wing project shortly after declaring his candidacy in August 2016. He promised to offer French enterprises preference in bidding, reverse the 2011 tax increases on the French middle class, and repeal most of the El Khomri labor law while preserving certain "interesting" social protections such as the "right to disconnect" and "personal activity account". Critical of European austerity, he declared that he would defy the requirement to maintain a budget deficit under 3% of GDP and intended to strengthen intelligence services, require six months of civic service, and achieve gender equality. He also proposed €30 billion in spending to stimulate economic growth, lower the general social contribution (CSG) to increase individuals' purchasing power by €800 a year, create 5,000 new posts in hospitals, call a referendum on a new republic, promulgate a law on the separation of banking activities (as Hollande did), impose a European carbon tax, and establish a national anti-terrorism prosecutor.

The signature proposal of Benoît Hamon was the implementation a universal basic income for all French citizens, rolled out in stages beginning in 2018, partially funded by a tax levied on property combining the existing property tax (taxe foncière) and the solidarity tax on wealth (ISF), in addition to a tax on robots to fund social protections in general. Like fellow Socialist dissidents, Hamon criticized the El Khomri labor law and promised to repeal it if elected, and suggested that it be replaced with legislation acknowledging the need for greater social protections, including the right to disconnect and recognizing burnout as an occupational disease. He also proposed to reduce the 35-hour workweek to 32 hours, saying that it was time to put an end to the "myth" of economic growth. Another of his flagship proposals was to legalize cannabis, using funds for "prevention" rather than "repression".

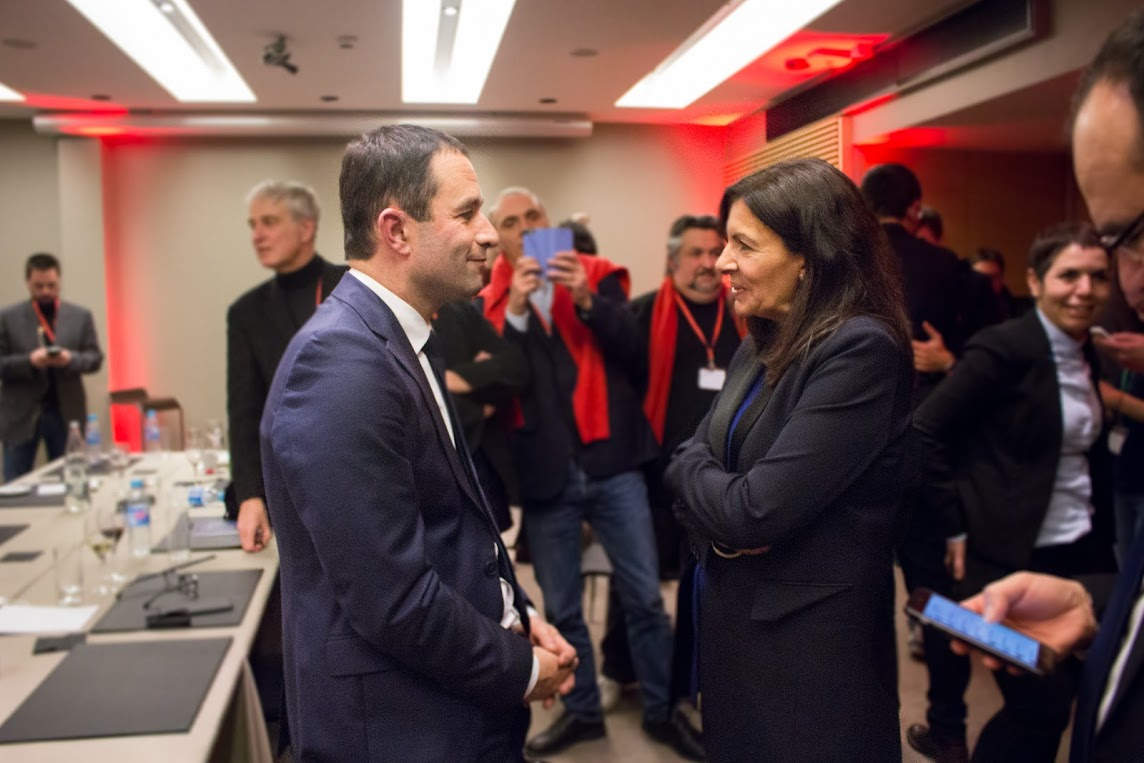
Benoît Hamon congratulated by Mayor of Paris Anne Hidalgo after his primary victory on 29 January

In the first round of the primary on 22 January, Hamon and Valls received 36.03% and 31.48%, respectively, and advanced to the runoff on 29 January. Montebourg, who secured only 17.52% of votes, declared that he would cast his second-round vote for Hamon soon after the result became apparent. Among the remaining candidates, Peillon secured 6.81% of the vote, de Rugy 3.83%, Pinel 2.00%, and Bennahmias 1.02%. Overall turnout stood at 1.66 million. The legitimacy of the first-round results published by the organizers of the primary was questioned by observers in the French press, who noted that an overnight update added 352,013 votes without significantly changing each candidate's percentage, with vote totals for each candidate increasing by 28%. Christophe Borgel, president of the organizing committee of the primary, claimed that the anomaly was nothing more than a "bug" induced by pressure to update the level of participation in the first round, effectively acknowledging that the results of the primary were manipulated. Only on 23 January did the High Authority of the primary publish "validated" results. In the second round of the primary on 29 January, Hamon defeated Valls by a comfortable margin, 58.69% to 41.31%; turnout, at 2.05 million, was considerably higher than in the first round. As the winner of the primary, Hamon became the Socialist nominee for president.

On 22 February, François de Rugy announced his support for Emmanuel Macron, breaking the commitment requested of former candidates to back the winner of the primary. While acknowledging that Hamon was the legitimate PS nominee, de Rugy said he preferred "coherence to obedience". On 13 March, Le Parisien reported that Valls, rather than backing Hamon, would urge voters to support Macron in the first round of the presidential election; Valls denied the report at the time, but on 29 March declared that he would vote for Macron but would not rally behind his candidacy. On 8 April the High Authority of the PS reminded party members to abide by the "principle of loyalty". On 15 March, the PRG announced its support for Hamon, securing concessions on issues pertaining to European governance, and confirmed an agreement with the Socialist Party for the legislative elections; this followed a period of hesitation after the primary in which the party contemplated Macron's candidacy, which secured several of its parliamentarians' support.

== Fillon affair (Penelopegate) ==
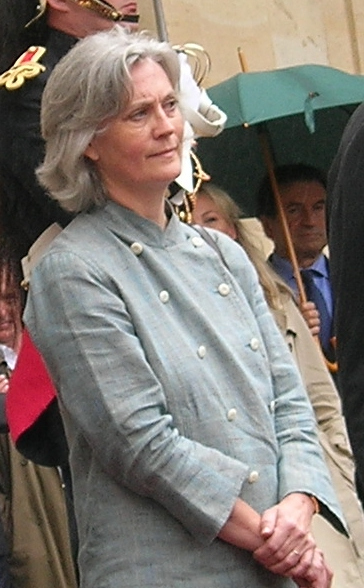
Penelope Fillon in 2007

On 25 January 2017, the satirical weekly Le Canard enchaîné first alleged that François Fillon employed his wife Penelope as his parliamentary assistant from 1998 and 2002 and for six months in 2012, with no evidence that she completed any substantial work. She collected a monthly salary of €3,900 to €4,600. After her husband's appointment as Minister of Social Affairs in 2002 and during his later tenure as Minister of National Education, she went on to serve until 2007 as a parliamentary aide to Marc Joulaud, Fillon's substitute, earning an increased salary upwards of €7,900 and with still no evidence of substantial work. The article claimed that she received a total of over €500,000 as a parliamentary aide, as well as €100,000 as a literary adviser to the Revue des deux Mondes. Its owner, billionaire Marc Ladreit de Lacharrière, is a close friend of François Fillon. While deputies in the National Assembly can employ family members, those are still required to complete legitimate work, evidence of which the paper was unable to find. Based on that information and on the same day, the National Financial Prosecutor's office (PNF) initiated a preliminary investigation into possible embezzlement and misuse of public funds.

On 26 January, François Fillon appeared on TF1 to respond to these allegations, stating that his wife had "edited my speeches" and "stood in for me at events when I couldn’t be there", also claiming that the reason that she was never seen working in the Palais Bourbon was because "she was never on the front line". In the interview, he disclosed that he also paid two of his children while a Senator for the Sarthe between 2005 and 2007, claiming that he employed them in their capacity as lawyers. He also pledged to resign if he would be personally placed under investigation. However, on 27 January, it was revealed that both Marie and Charles Fillon were only law students when their father employed them during his stint in the Senate, contrary to his statements the previous day. Interrogated by investigators the same day, former editor-in-chief of the Revue des deux Mondes Michel Crépu claimed that only "two or maybe three" bylines in the review were attributed to her, also saying that he had seen "no trace" of any work by her that would "resemble [that of] a literary adviser".

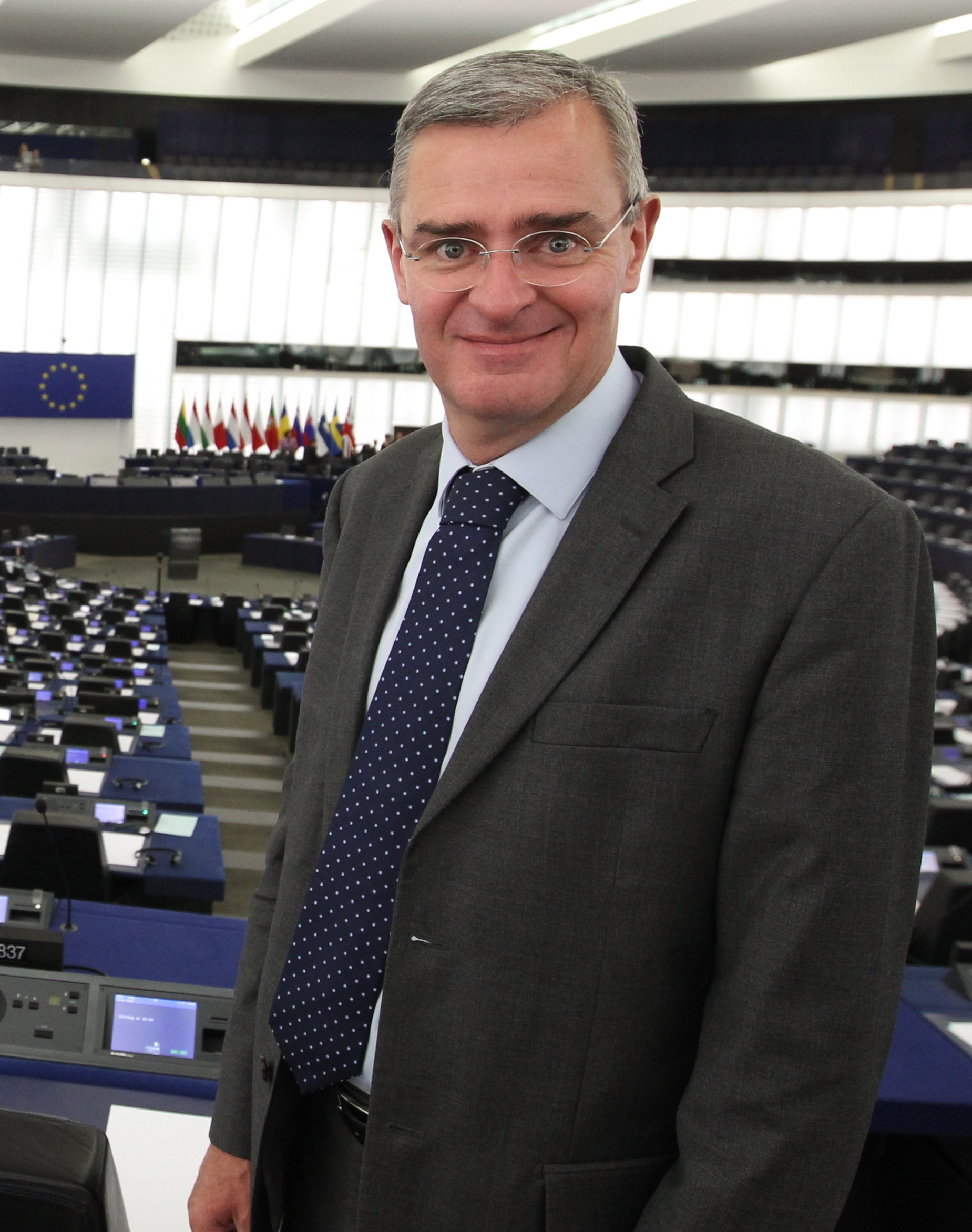
Marc Joulaud in 2014

On 1 February, a week after its initial report, Le Canard enchaîné published revelations that the total sum received by Penelope Fillon in fictitious jobs apparently totaled more than €930,000; with the addition of the period from 1988 to 1990, her income as a parliamentary assistant now totaled €831,440. In addition, the satirical weekly also revealed that the payments to two of Fillon's children reached nearly €84,000, with €57,084 net for Marie Fillon and €26,651 for Charles Fillon. Video excerpts of a May 2007 Sunday Telegraph interview with Penelope Fillon surfaced on 2 February, in which she claimed that she had "never been his assistant", referring to her husband; The footage aired on Envoyé spécial on France 2 that evening. The PNF expanded investigation into the fictitious employment affair to include Fillon's two eldest children the same day to verify the veracity of their work, after Le Canard enchaîné reported that neither Marie nor Charles Fillon were lawyers at the time their father served in the Senate. In a video on 3 February, François Fillon insisted that he would maintain his candidacy and called on his supporters to "hold the line", seeking to assuage worries from within his own camp about the maintenance of his candidacy.

On 6 February, Fillon held a press conference at which he "apologized to the French people" and acknowledged that he had committed an "error" in employing family members as parliamentary assistants, but appended that he "never broke the law". He also argued that his wife's "salary was perfectly justified", adding that everything reported by the press on the issue was "legal and transparent". He said he would not reimburse the payments received by his wife or children, and, saying that he had "nothing to hide", divulged his property holdings. In addition to promising that his lawyers would question the competency of the PNF to carry out the investigation, he lambasted a "media lynching" of his campaign. His remarks followed Juppé's declaration that "NO means NO" earlier in the day in response to rumors that he might replace Fillon as the party's candidate should he decide to drop his bid.

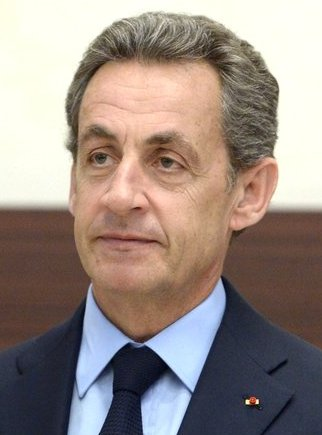
Sarkozy in 2015

Le Canard enchaîné continued its run of stories on Fillon in its issue of 8 February, revealing that Penelope Fillon collected severance payments totaling €45,000, with €16,000 in August 2002 for the period 1998–2002 and €29,000 in 2013 for seventeen months of employment for which she earned €65,839. The satirical weekly also asserted that she received a double salary during the summer of 2002, as she was hired by Joulaud's office on 13 July, more than a month before her contract as a parliamentary assistant with her husband expired, on 21 August. Although aides are eligible to collect severance payments, the law does not permit such a high level for parliamentary assistants. An article in the same issue reported that Marie Fillon was simultaneously employed as a parliamentary assistant while training to become a lawyer, taking the first post in October 2005 and entering the EFB in January 2006. Fillon responded to the claims in a press release by saying that Le Canard enchaîné conflated the amount his wife collected in November 2013 with reported earnings in August 2007 after the conclusion of her work with Joulaud, and denounced the paper's allegations as "lies".

On 16 February, Fillon seemingly withdrew his earlier promise that he would terminate his candidacy if placed under formal investigation, saying "even if I am put under investigation, nothing will stop me" in private. In an interview with Le Figaro published on 17 February, he insisted on continuing his campaign, declaring "I am the candidate and I will continue until victory" and that the closer to the election it was, the "more scandalous it would be to deprive the right and centre of a candidate". On 24 February the PNF finally opened a judicial investigation into the "embezzlement of public funds, [...] influence-peddling and failure to comply with transparency obligations of the HATVP" against François Fillon, his wife, two of his children, and Marc Joulaud (who were left unnamed, presumably, to allow for expanding the investigation to other suspects, if necessary). The OCLCIFF, which failed to unearth any tangible proof of work by Fillon's wife as a parliamentary assistant to her husband from 1988 to 1990, 1998 to 2000, and 2012 to 2013 or to Marc Joulaud from 2002 to 2007, and was unconvinced by the two reviews in the Revue des deux Mondes attributed to Penelope Fillon, tasked three investigative judges to continue pursuing the affair. These three judges were identified on 27 February as Serge Tournaire, Stéphanie Tacheau, and Aude Buresi.

On 1 March, Fillon was informed that he was summoned to appear before the judges and likely to be placed under formal investigation – generally a precursor to an eventual indictment – on 15 March. In the subsequent hours and days, hundreds of campaign members, allies, and supporters rescinded their support for Fillon, including the Union of Democrats and Independents (UDI), a centre-right party whose president Jean-Christophe Lagarde backed Juppé in the primary, suspended its participation in the campaign. fifteen campaign staffers, and hundreds of others; a total of 306 elected officials and members of the Fillon campaign withdrew their support for the candidate by 5 March. Many of those rescinding their support speculated about the potential return of Juppé to replace Fillon as the party's candidate, with Fenech urging elected officials file sponsorships for the ex-primary candidate. Meanwhile, associates of Juppé indicated that he was apparently warming to the idea of stepping in to run if needed, "ready but loyal".

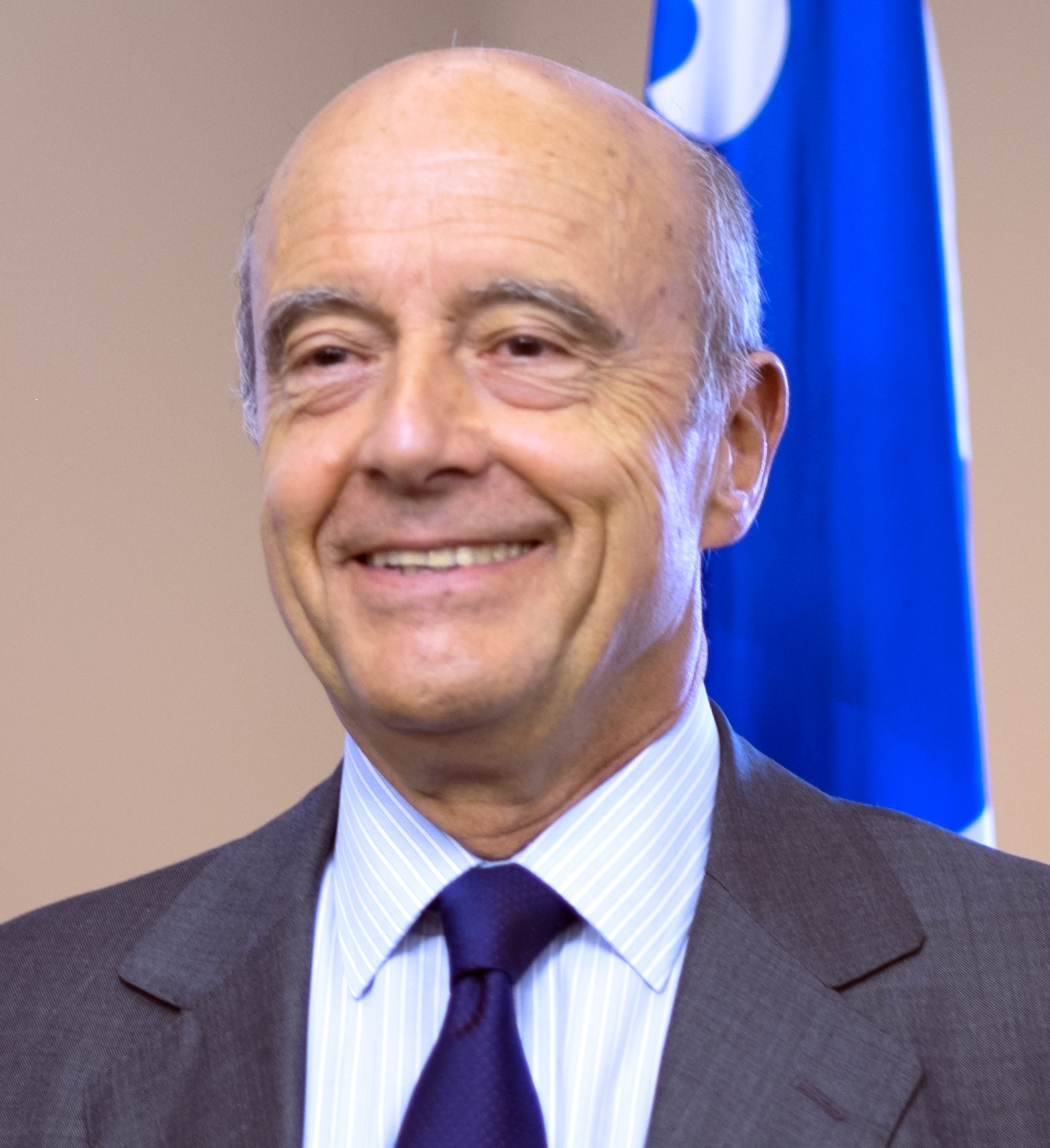
Alain Juppé in 2015

Despite this chain of defections, François Fillon remained defiant, holding a rally at the Trocadéro on that afternoon intended as show of force. He then appeared on 20 heures on France 2 that evening, during which he refused to give up his candidacy, saying that "there is no alternative" and adding that "no one today can stop me from being a candidate", insisting that "it is not the party that will decide" the fate of his candidacy. He said that the rally at the Trocadéro cemented his legitimacy, and that though he would have stepped down two months ago if indicted then, it was now too close to the presidential election and it would be unfair to voters of the right if he quit now. With a "political committee" planned for the following day, he proposed to assemble a modified campaign team, naming François Baroin, Éric Ciotti, and Luc Chatel, in an attempt to rally support around his candidacy. Immediately after Fillon's appearance, Juppé announced on Twitter that he give a statement to the press in Bordeaux at 10:30 CET the day after.

Juppé officially announced his abstention from the race on 6 March, saying that "for me, it is too late", and added that Fillon was at a "dead end" with his allegations of political assassination. The same day, the party's "political committee" rallied behind Fillon, unanimously reaffirming its support for his candidacy. The same day, Le Canard enchaîné revealed that Fillon had failed to declare to the HATVP a €50,000 loan from Marc Ladreit de Lacharrière, president of the Revue des deux Mondes. The UDI renewed its support for Fillon that evening, albeit only conditionally. On 13 March, Le Parisien revealed that investigators discovered suspicious wire transfers made by Marie and Charles Fillon to their father while employed by him, with Marie returning €33,000 of the €46,000 she was paid. Charles Fillon, in his hearing, referred to similar transfers to his parents' joint account, worth about 30% of his salary.

On the morning of 14 March, Fillon was placed under formal investigation for misuse of public funds, embezzlement, and failure to comply with HATVP disclosure requirements. On 16 March the investigation into Fillon was extended to "aggravated fraud, forgery, and falsification of records". In particular, the probe sought to determine whether documents seized during a search of the National Assembly in March were forged in order to corroborate the veracity of Penelope Fillon's work as a parliamentary assistant. The investigation was also expanded into possible influence-peddling related to Fillon's consulting firm 2F Conseil, which was previously hired by billionaire Marc Ladreit de Lacharrière, owner of the Revue des deux Mondes, which employed Penelope Fillon. In 2013 de Lacharrière also provided a €50,000 loan to François Fillon, who failed to declare it as legally required. On L'Émission politique on 23 March, Fillon said that Bienvenue Place Beauvau, a book co-authored by Didier Hassoux of Le Canard enchaîné, suggested President Hollande ran a shadow cabinet to spread rumours about his opponents, a claim Hassoux subsequently denied. On 24 March, Marc Joulaud, Fillon's former substitute, was formally placed under investigation for embezzlement of public funds. Penelope Fillon was placed under formal investigation for complicity in and concealment of embezzlement and misuse of public funds, as well as aggravated fraud, on 28 March.

On 10 April, Mediapart revealed that Penelope Fillon had in fact been paid by the National Assembly starting in 1982, not 1986, as earlier claimed by François Fillon. The edition of Le Canard enchaîné set for publication on 12 April revealed that François Fillon secured his then-fiancée a job three times the minimum wage in a Parisian ministry as early as 1980 while he was serving as deputy chief of staff to Minister of Defence Joël Le Theule; her contract ended in 1981, after 15 months, after the Socialists swept into power.

== Other incidents ==
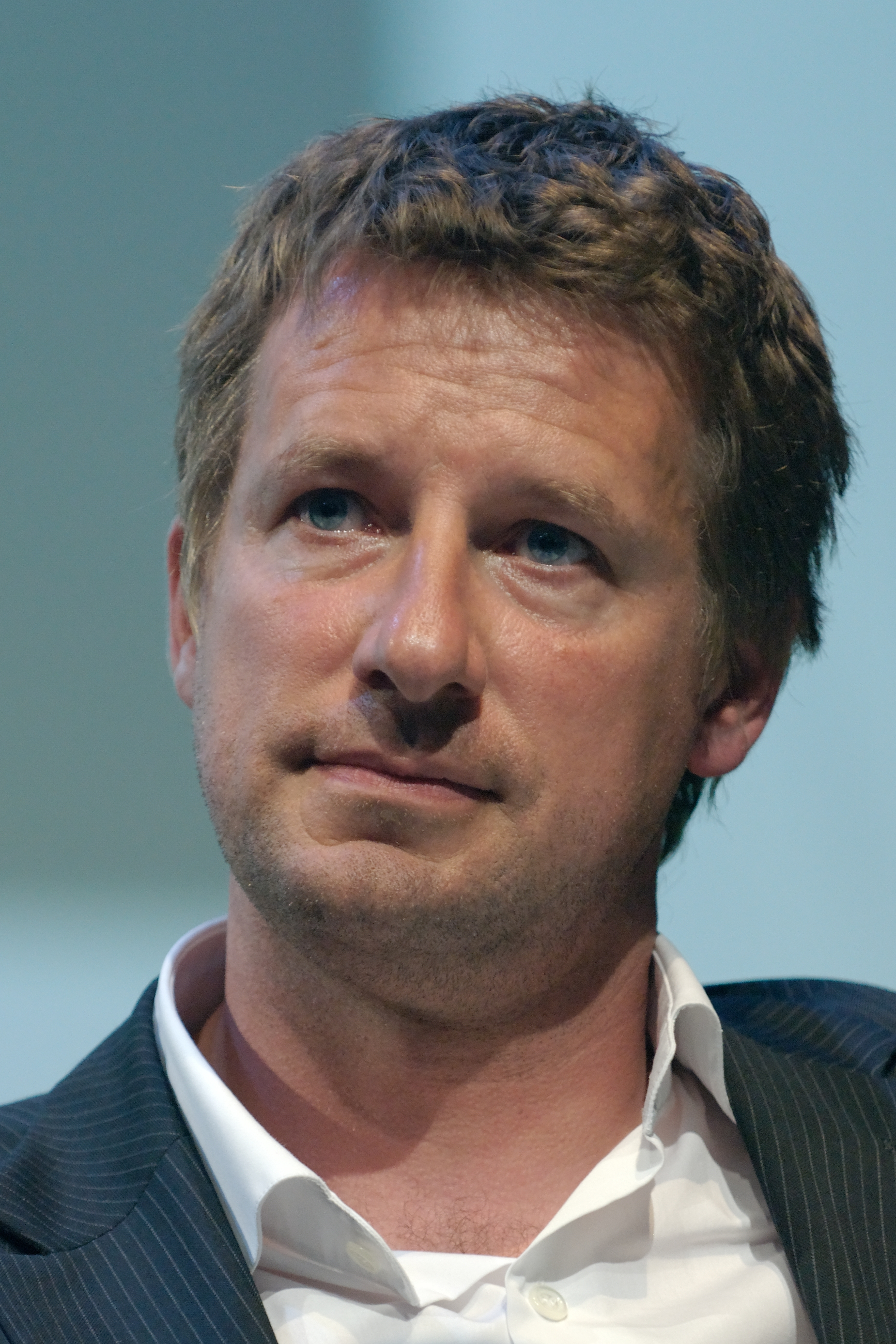
Yannick Jadot (EELV) withdrew to support Hamon

After securing his party's nomination in its presidential primary on 29 January 2017, Socialist Party (PS) dissident Benoît Hamon proposed forming a "governmental majority" with Jean-Luc Mélenchon of la France Insoumise (FI) and Yannick Jadot of Europe Ecology – The Greens (EELV), seeking to "reconcile the left and the environmentalists". Though Mélenchon had earlier demonstrated hostility to the possibility of an alliance, he expressed "satisfaction" with Hamon's sentiments shortly after the primary. On 23 February, Jadot cemented an agreement to withdraw his candidacy in favor of Hamon, but on 26 February Hamon acknowledged that talks to secure an alliance with Mélenchon had failed, the pair only agreeing to a code of mutual respect. The talks failed in part because of the candidates' differing positions on matters related to the European Union (EU), European Central Bank (ECB), EU treaties, European defense, and the obligation to maintain a budget deficit below 3% of GDP, among other divergences.

During a trip to Algeria on 15 February, Emmanuel Macron, candidate of En Marche!, remarked in an interview with local press that the French presence in the country had been a "crime against humanity" and "truly barbaric", drawing the ire of numerous right-wing French politicians. François Fillon of the Republicans denounced Macron's remarks as a "hatred of our history, this constant repentance is unworthy of a candidate for the presidency of the Republic". Seeking to put aside the controversy in a meeting in Toulon on 18 February, he attempted to qualify his remarks, saying that he was "sorry" for having "hurt" and "offended" many as a result, but nevertheless continued to insist on acknowledging that France had a responsibility for its colonial past, not just in Algeria. His remarks were followed by a temporary resurgence for Fillon in polls of voting intentions.

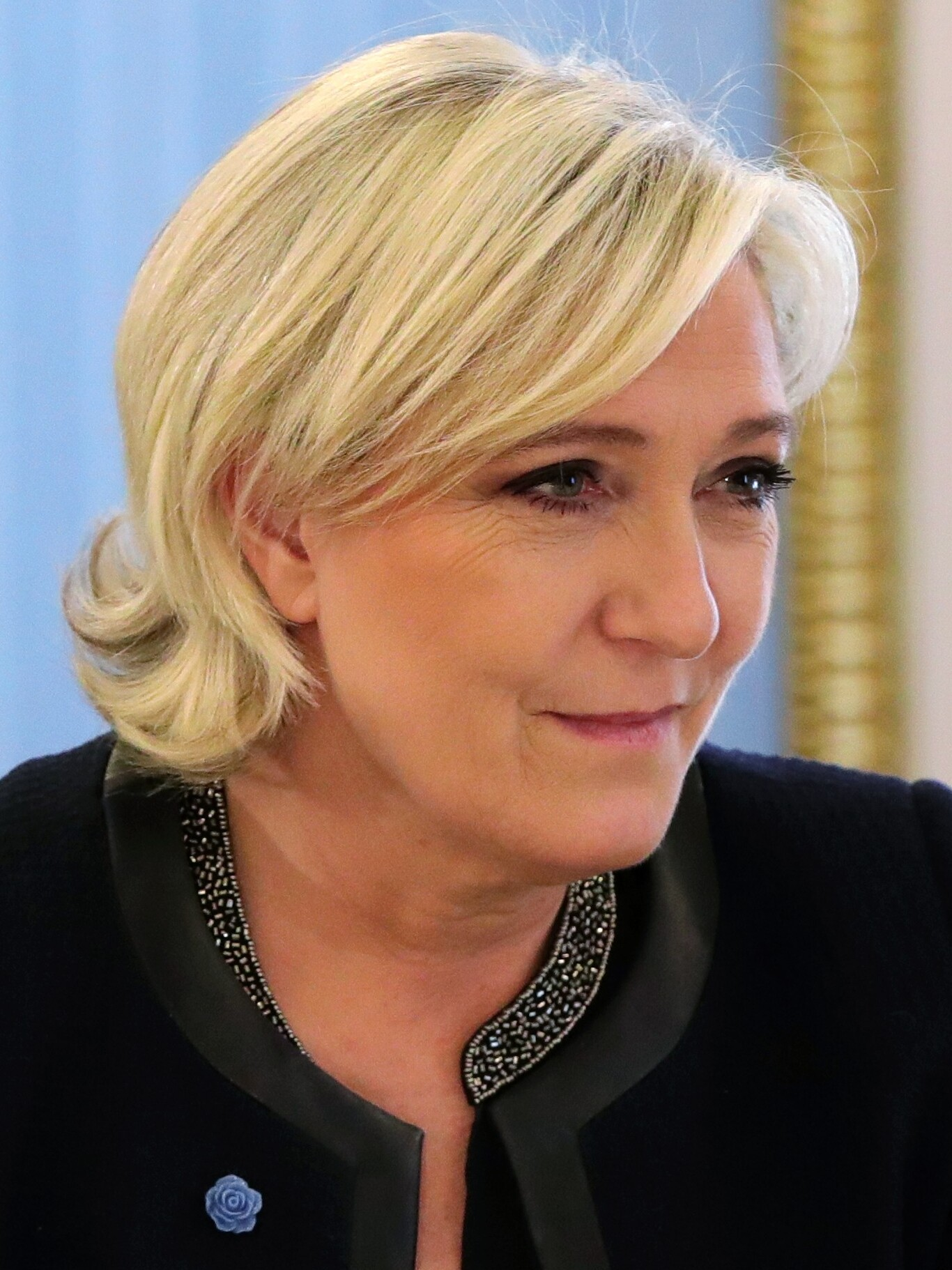
Marine Le Pen at Moscow Kremlin in 2017

The various investigations of the fictitious employment of 29 parliamentary assistants to 23 National Front (FN) MEPs, implicating the entourage of Marine Le Pen, continued through 2017. These fictitious jobs would constitute €7.5 million in losses for European taxpayers from the period 2010 to 2016. The European Anti-fraud Office (OLAF) pursued the case, establishing that one of Le Pen's parliamentary assistants, Catherine Griset, never secured a lease in Brussels during the five years she was employed and only rarely appeared in the European Parliament, while another, Thierry Légier, worked as a bodyguard at the same time. Though the European Parliament demanded that Le Pen return €298,392 by 31 January 2018, representing the salary "unduly paid" to Griset, she refused to do so, and the European Parliament began to reduce her salary to reclaim the money. On 20 February, investigators raided the FN's headquarters in Nanterre for a second time in connection to the case; though Le Pen was summoned to appear before judges on 22 February in the Griset case, she refused to do so until after the June legislative elections, invoking the parliamentary immunity granted to her as an MEP. On 3 March, summoned to appear before judges to potentially be charged for breach of confidence, Le Pen was absent, again affirming that she would not respond to the case before the end of the campaign. On 6 March, Charles Hourcade, who served as parliamentary assistant to FN MEP Marie-Christine Boutonnet, faced charges of "concealment of breach of confidence" in a separate case; like Le Pen, who described the investigations into the FN's fictitious employment of parliamentary assistants as a "political operation", Boutonnet declined to appear before judges.

On 20 April, three days before the first round, three police officers were shot and one killed in an attack on the Champs-Élysées, interrupting the 15 minutes pour convaincre (15 minutes to convince) on France 2, a program featuring successive interviews with the 11 candidates; in the following interviews, the remaining candidates paid tribute to the victims of the attack. In the wake of the attack, Le Pen and Fillon, suspended campaign activities the following day – the final day of campaigning – while Macron canceled two trips and Mélenchon insisted on maintaining his schedule to demonstrate that he would not allow violence to interrupt the democratic process; Hamon made similar remarks, proceeding with one campaign event the following day.

A report published on 25 April by the Japan-based security firm Trend Micro alleged that a group of hackers was targeting the Macron campaign. The group, known as Pawn Storm (better known as Fancy Bear or APT28), is believed to be linked to the Russian state, and was responsible for previous attacks, including on TV5Monde in April and the Bundestag in May 2015. In particular, the group attempted a phishing operation, registering four domains strongly resembling those actually used by En Marche!, of which three were domiciled in Ukraine and one in France.

In an interview with Associated Press the head of the French government's cyber security agency, which investigated leaks from President Emmanuel Macron's election campaign, said that they didn't find any trace of a notorious Russian hacking group behind the attack.

== First round ==
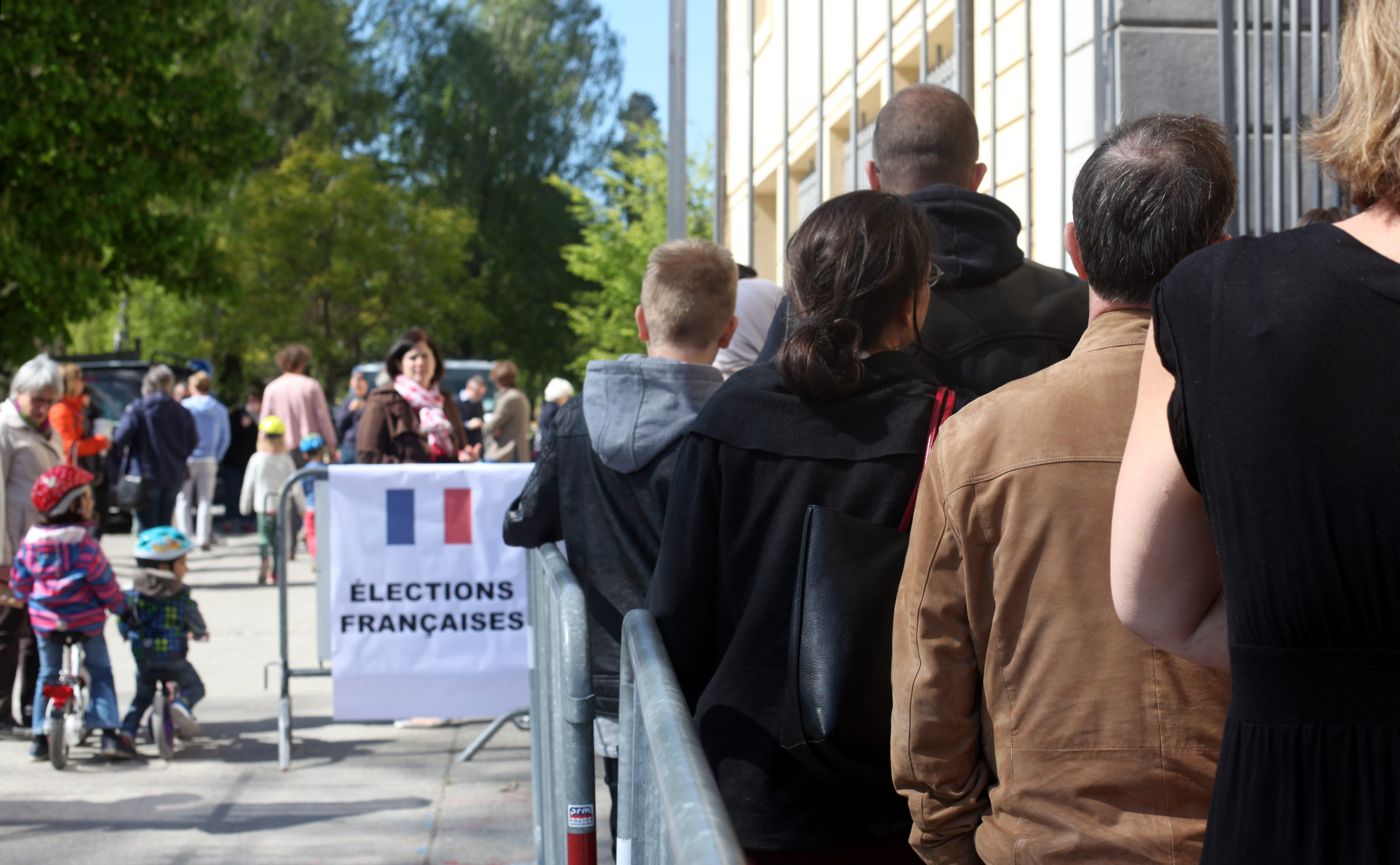
A voting line of French expatriates in Morges, Switzerland

The official campaign began on 10 April and ended at midnight on 21 April. During this period, the Conseil supérieur de l'audiovisuel was to ensure equal speaking time for candidates in audiovisual media. On French public broadcasters, ten slots were allotted to the eleven candidates from 10 to 18 and 20 April, with nine slots on 19 April and eleven slots – one for each candidate – on 21 April, the final day of active campaigning.

Voting in the first round took place on Saturday 22 April from 08:00 to 19:00 (local time) in the French overseas departments and territories situated east of the International Date Line and west of metropolitan France (i.e. French Guiana, French Polynesia, Guadeloupe, Martinique, Saint Martin, Saint Barthélemy and Saint Pierre and Miquelon), as well as at French diplomatic missions in the Americas. Although overseas voting took place one day before that in metropolitan France, the election results and final turnout figures were announced at the same time, starting at 20:00 (Paris time) on 23 April, once voting ended in metropolitan France. Voting in metropolitan France (as well as the French overseas departments and territories of Mayotte, New Caledonia, Réunion and Wallis and Futuna, and French diplomatic missions outside the Americas) took place on 23 April from 08:00 to 19:00 or 20:00 (local time).

The official election results were declared by the Constitutional Council on 26 April, with Macron and Le Pen advancing to the second round.

=== Debates ===
A debate between François Fillon, Benoît Hamon, Marine Le Pen, Emmanuel Macron, and Jean-Luc Mélenchon took place on 20 March, hosted by TF1 and moderated by journalists Anne-Claire Coudray and Gilles Bouleau. It was the first time that a debate prior to the first round was held. The choice of date meant that TF1 would not be required to provide candidates with equal speaking time, as Conseil supérieur de l'audiovisuel (CSA) regulations do not go into force until 9 April, the start of the official campaign. Nicolas Dupont-Aignan, who was not invited, denounced the debate as a "rape of democracy", and the CSA urged TF1 to guarantee fair speaking time for other candidates. Dupont-Aignan filed an appeal that was rejected in part because he had already received airtime proportionate to his support. On 18 March, appearing on TF1, he quit mid-interview, furious at his exclusion from the network's debate. The first debate began with an introductory question – "What kind of president do you want to be?" – followed by segments on three themes lasting about 50 minutes each: what type of society France should have, what type of economic model France should adopt, and the place of France in the world. The five candidates were given two minutes to answer each question, but opponents had the opportunity to interject 90 seconds in. The debate was three and a half hours long, and was watched by 9.8 million (47% of the audience share) on TF1, peaking at 11.5 million.

BFM TV and CNews hosted the second debate on 4 April at 20:40 CEST, moderated by Ruth Elkrief and Laurence Ferrari, inviting all candidates who qualified to appear on the first-round ballot. The start time, earlier than that of the TF1 debate, was chosen to avoid continuing well past midnight. Three themes were addressed: employment, the French social model, and the protection of the French. The final part of the debate concerned the exercise of power and moralization of public officials. Each of the 11 candidates invited had a minute and a half to answer each question, and other candidates were permitted to challenge their answers. This was the first ever debate including all first-round candidates; A total of 6.3 million people representing an audience share of 32% viewed the debate; BFM TV alone claimed 5.5 million viewers, equivalent to 28% audience share – an all-time record for the channel.

France 2 intended to host a debate with all candidates on 20 April, but on 28 March Mélenchon stated he was unhappy with its timing, planning not to attend, and would prefer that it be held before 17 April. Macron also expressed reservations about the proposed third debate, stating that he wanted only one debate with all 11 candidates before the first round, and preferably not just three days before the first round of voting. On 29 March, the CSA indicated that it was "concerned" that the date of the debate was too close to the first round, and recommended that candidates and broadcasters work to find an agreement as quickly as possible. France Télévisions decided to maintain the date of 20 April due to the lack of a consensus on an alternative the following day, but abandoned plans for a third debate on 5 April, instead proposing that individual candidates be interviewed by Léa Salamé and David Pujadas during that timeslot. The plan was finally confirmed on 18 April, with France 2 offering successive 15-minute interviews to the 11 candidates with the two hosts.

2017 French presidential election first-round debates
Date	Organizers	Moderators	P Present NI Non-invitee											Notes
Date	Organizers	Moderators	Arthaud	Poutou	Mélenchon	Hamon	Macron	Lassalle	Fillon	Dupont-Aignan	Asselineau	Le Pen	Cheminade	Notes
20 March; 21:00 CET	TF1; LCI	Anne-Claire Coudray; Gilles Bouleau	NI	NI	P	P	P	NI	P	NI	NI	P	NI	
4 April; 20:40 CEST	BFM TV; CNews	Ruth Elkrief; Laurence Ferrari	P	P	P	P	P	P	P	P	P	P	P	
Candidate viewed as "most convincing" in each debate
Debate		Poll source	Arthaud	Poutou	Mélenchon	Hamon	Macron	Lassalle	Fillon	Dupont-Aignan	Asselineau	Le Pen	Cheminade	Notes
20 March TF1/LCI		Elabe			20%	11%	29%		19%			19%		
20 March TF1/LCI		OpinionWay			17%	8%	25%		20%			18%		
20 March TF1/LCI		Harris*			13%	6%	20%		17%			18%		
20 March TF1/LCI		Ifop-Fiducial*			17%	5%	19%		12%			16%		
4 April BFM TV/CNews		Elabe	3%	5%	25%	9%	21%	1%	15%	6%	3%	11%	0%	
4 April BFM TV/CNews		OpinionWay	1%	3%	20%	8%	19%	2%	17%	5%	3%	10%	0%	
4 April BFM TV/CNews		Harris*	1%	2%	14%	6%	16%	2%	12%	4%	1%	15%	0%	
4 April BFM TV/CNews		Ifop-Fiducial*	2%	6%	24%	7%	19%	2%	16%	5%	2%	16%	1%	
* Harris and Ifop-Fiducial polls were conducted among those aware of the debate; Elabe and OpinionWay polls among debate viewers.

=== Electorate ===
Sociology of the electorate
Demographic	Arthaud/ Poutou	Mélenchon	Hamon	Macron	Fillon	Dupont-Aignan	Le Pen	Others	Turnout
Total vote	1.7%	19.6%	6.4%	24.0%	20.0%	4.7%	21.3%	2.3%	77.8%
First-round vote in 2012
Jean-Luc Mélenchon	1%	80%	5%	10%	0%	1%	3%	0%	80%
François Hollande	1%	24%	15%	47%	3%	3%	6%	1%	83%
François Bayrou	2%	10%	5%	43%	22%	9%	3%	6%	82%
Nicolas Sarkozy	0%	3%	1%	17%	59%	4%	14%	2%	87%
Marine Le Pen	0%	3%	0%	2%	6%	3%	85%	1%	86%
Political party
EXG	7%	62%	2%	7%	8%	0%	14%	0%	84%
FG	3%	84%	5%	3%	3%	1%	0%	1%	83%
EELV	5%	38%	22%	19%	2%	7%	4%	3%	66%
PS	2%	23%	27%	42%	2%	1%	2%	1%	83%
EM	0%	5%	1%	91%	1%	1%	1%	0%	88%
MoDem	1%	11%	3%	46%	24%	12%	0%	3%	84%
UDI	0%	0%	2%	36%	50%	9%	2%	1%	81%
LR	0%	2%	0%	9%	77%	4%	7%	1%	89%
FN	1%	2%	1%	2%	4%	2%	87%	1%	85%
None	4%	23%	3%	19%	10%	12%	21%	8%	57%
Self-described political position
Very left-wing	7%	72%	8%	3%	1%	0%	9%	0%	81%
Left-wing	2%	53%	20%	23%	1%	1%	0%	0%	88%
Rather left-wing	1%	30%	15%	47%	2%	1%	3%	1%	78%
Centre	0%	8%	2%	60%	15%	7%	5%	3%	81%
Rather right-wing	0%	2%	1%	23%	48%	9%	14%	3%	82%
Right-wing	0%	1%	0%	5%	66%	4%	24%	0%	91%
Very right-wing	1%	1%	0%	1%	12%	3%	80%	2%	91%
Neither left nor right	4%	16%	3%	17%	8%	9%	37%	6%	60%
Left subtotal	2%	44%	16%	32%	2%	1%	2%	1%	83%
Right and centre subtotal	0%	1%	1%	10%	47%	5%	34%	2%	88%
Sex
Men	2%	21%	4%	23%	18%	5%	24%	3%	78%
Women	2%	17%	8%	25%	21%	5%	20%	2%	77%
Age
18–24 years old	3%	30%	10%	18%	9%	6%	21%	3%	71%
25–34 years old	1%	24%	8%	28%	8%	3%	24%	4%	72%
35–49 years old	2%	22%	7%	21%	11%	6%	29%	2%	74%
50–59 years old	3%	21%	6%	21%	13%	6%	27%	3%	76%
60–69 years old	1%	15%	5%	26%	27%	5%	19%	2%	84%
70 or older	0%	9%	3%	27%	45%	4%	10%	2%	88%
Socio-occupational classification
Manager/professional	0%	19%	8%	33%	20%	4%	14%	2%	79%
Intermediate occupation	2%	22%	9%	26%	13%	6%	19%	3%	78%
White-collar worker	4%	22%	6%	19%	8%	7%	32%	2%	71%
Blue-collar worker	4%	24%	5%	16%	5%	5%	37%	4%	71%
Retired	1%	12%	4%	26%	36%	5%	14%	2%	87%
Employment status
Employee	3%	21%	7%	24%	11%	5%	26%	3%	74%
Private employee	2%	20%	6%	25%	12%	6%	26%	3%	73%
Public employee	3%	23%	7%	23%	9%	5%	27%	3%	75%
Self-employed	0%	24%	8%	24%	16%	5%	21%	2%	76%
Unemployed	3%	31%	7%	14%	8%	6%	26%	5%	73%
Education
Less than baccalauréat	2%	17%	4%	19%	19%	6%	30%	3%	75%
Baccalauréat	3%	21%	6%	24%	15%	5%	24%	2%	76%
Bac +2	1%	22%	6%	26%	22%	5%	15%	3%	80%
At least bac +3	1%	20%	10%	30%	24%	4%	9%	2%	81%
Monthly household income
Less than €1,250	3%	25%	7%	14%	12%	5%	32%	2%	70%
€1,250 to €2,000	3%	23%	6%	18%	15%	3%	29%	3%	76%
€2,000 to €3,000	2%	18%	7%	25%	17%	7%	20%	4%	80%
More than €3,000	1%	16%	5%	32%	25%	5%	15%	1%	84%
Moment of choice of vote
Several months ago	1%	16%	5%	20%	24%	2%	31%	1%	100%
A few weeks ago	2%	27%	7%	31%	15%	6%	10%	2%	100%
In the last few days	3%	21%	7%	29%	11%	14%	10%	5%	100%
At the last moment	5%	21%	9%	23%	17%	8%	11%	6%	100%
Agglomeration
Rural	3%	18%	5%	21%	19%	7%	23%	4%	80%
Fewer than 20,000 inhabitants	2%	20%	5%	23%	17%	5%	25%	3%	76%
20,000 to 100,000 inhabitants	1%	21%	7%	26%	18%	2%	24%	1%	73%
More than 100,000 inhabitants	1%	20%	7%	24%	21%	4%	21%	2%	78%
Paris agglomeration	1%	19%	6%	29%	25%	5%	14%	1%	76%
Religion
Catholic	2%	13%	4%	23%	28%	6%	22%	2%	80%
Regular practitioner	1%	8%	3%	20%	51%	5%	11%	1%	87%
Occasional practitioner	2%	13%	4%	23%	27%	6%	22%	3%	80%
Non-practitioner	2%	17%	6%	22%	16%	4%	29%	4%	77%
Others	2%	23%	9%	23%	21%	4%	15%	3%	72%
None	2%	28%	9%	25%	7%	4%	23%	2%	74%
Demographic									Turnout
Demographic	Arthaud/ Poutou	Mélenchon	Hamon	Macron	Fillon	Dupont-Aignan	Le Pen	Others	Turnout
Sociology of the electorate
Source: Ipsos France

== Second round ==
Candidates in the second round
Emmanuel Macron	Marine Le Pen
En Marche!	Front National
Minister of the Economy, Industry and Digital Affairs (2014–2016)	Member of the European Parliament for North-West France (2004–2017)

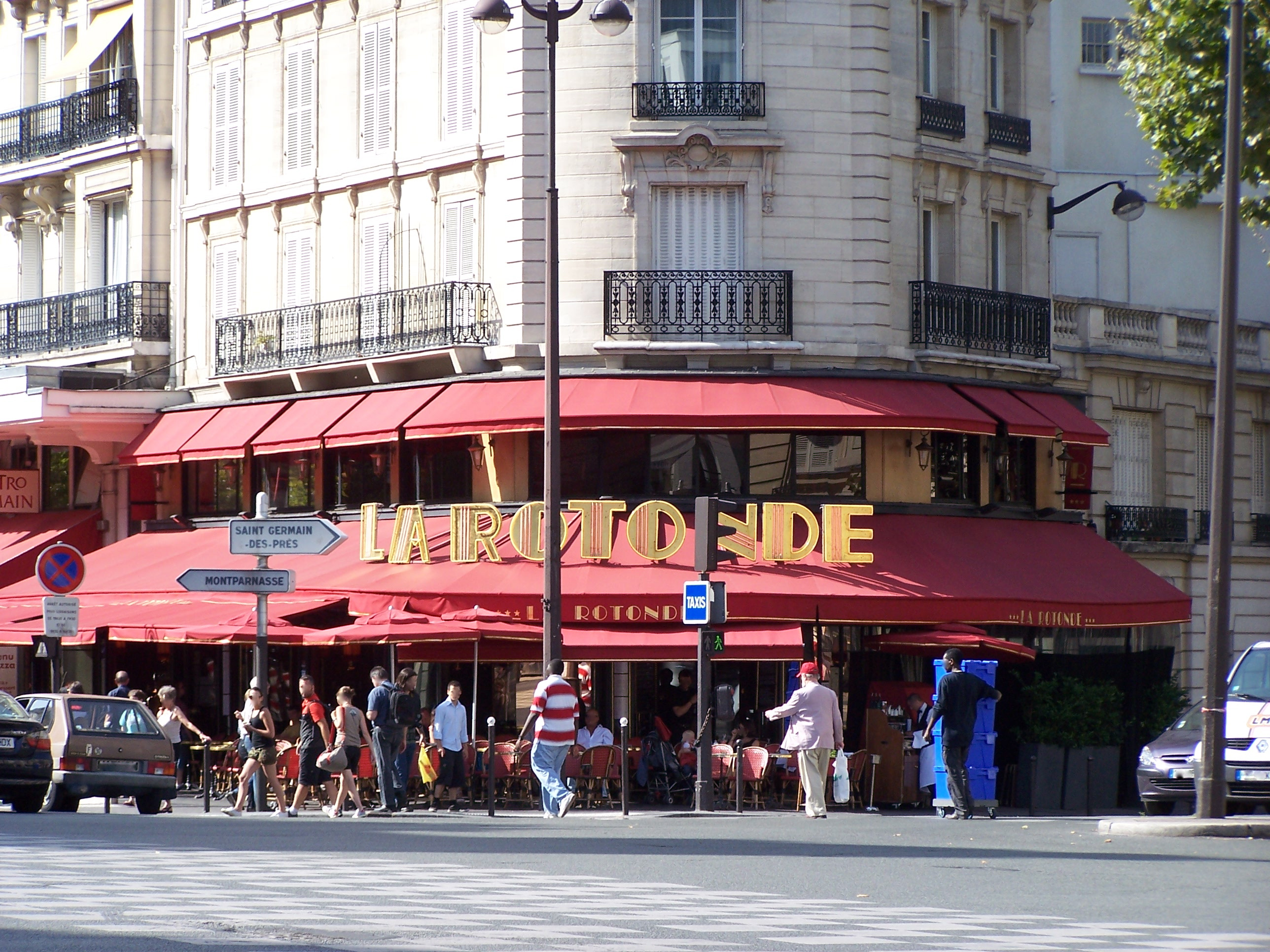
La Rotonde, where Macron celebrated the results of the first round

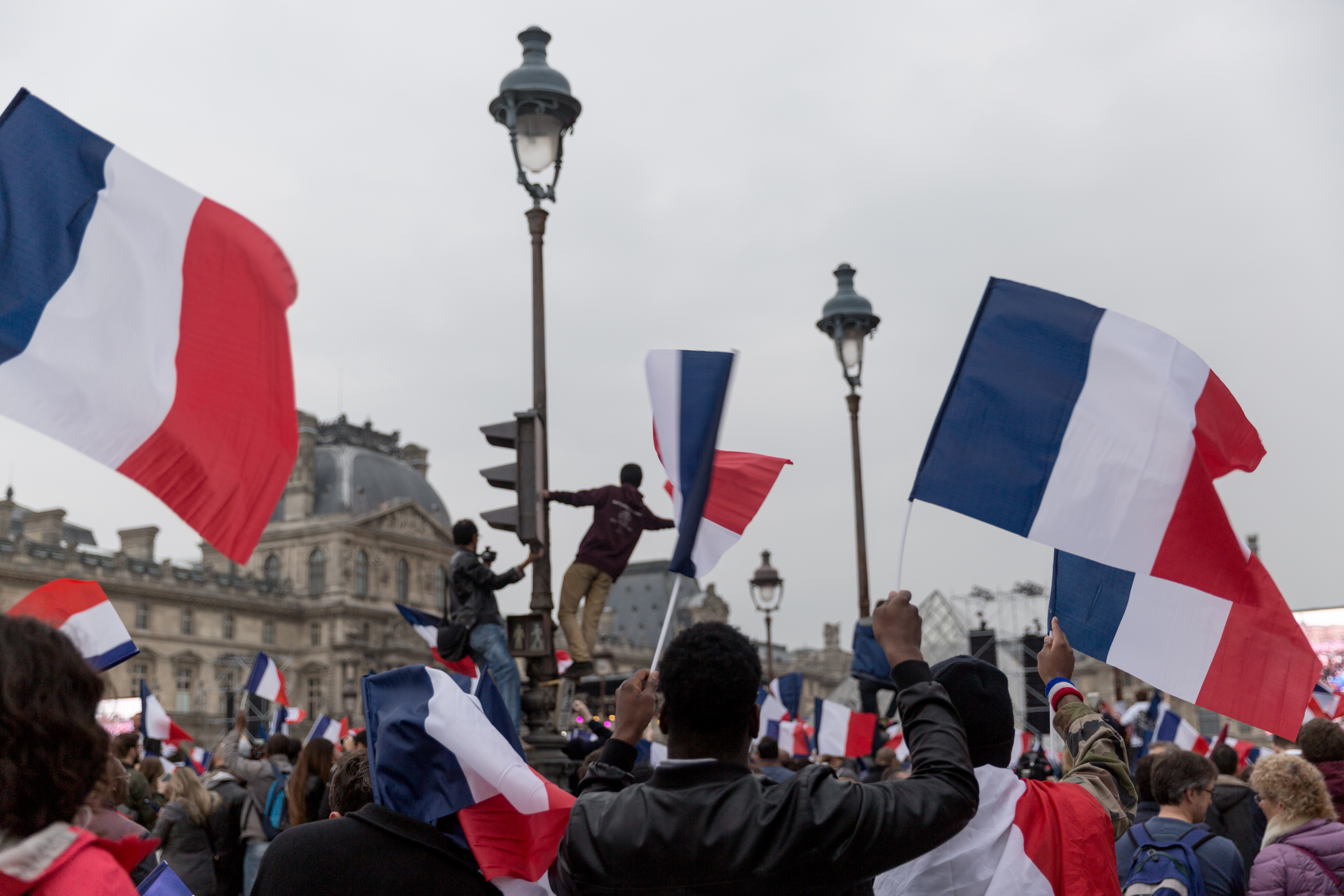
Supporters of Macron celebrating his victory at the Louvre on 7 May

After being eliminated in the first round, both François Fillon and Benoît Hamon called to vote for Emmanuel Macron, while Jean-Luc Mélenchon refused to pronounce in favor of either candidate, preferring to first consult activists from his movement. Jean Lassalle and Nathalie Arthaud opted to cast a blank vote, Philippe Poutou and François Asselineau gave no voting instructions, and Jacques Cheminade only stated that he would personally refuse to vote for Le Pen and denounced the forces of "financial occupation". Nicolas Dupont-Aignan endorsed Le Pen during the evening of 28 April, and was subsequently revealed as her choice for Prime Minister the following day. On 2 May, the result of Mélenchon's consultation was published, with 36.12% voting for a blank vote, 34.83% supporting a vote for Macron, and 29.05% opting to abstain; Mélenchon, for his part, issued no voting instructions, only urging his supporters not to make the "terrible error" of voting for Le Pen. Jean-Marie Le Pen supported his daughter.

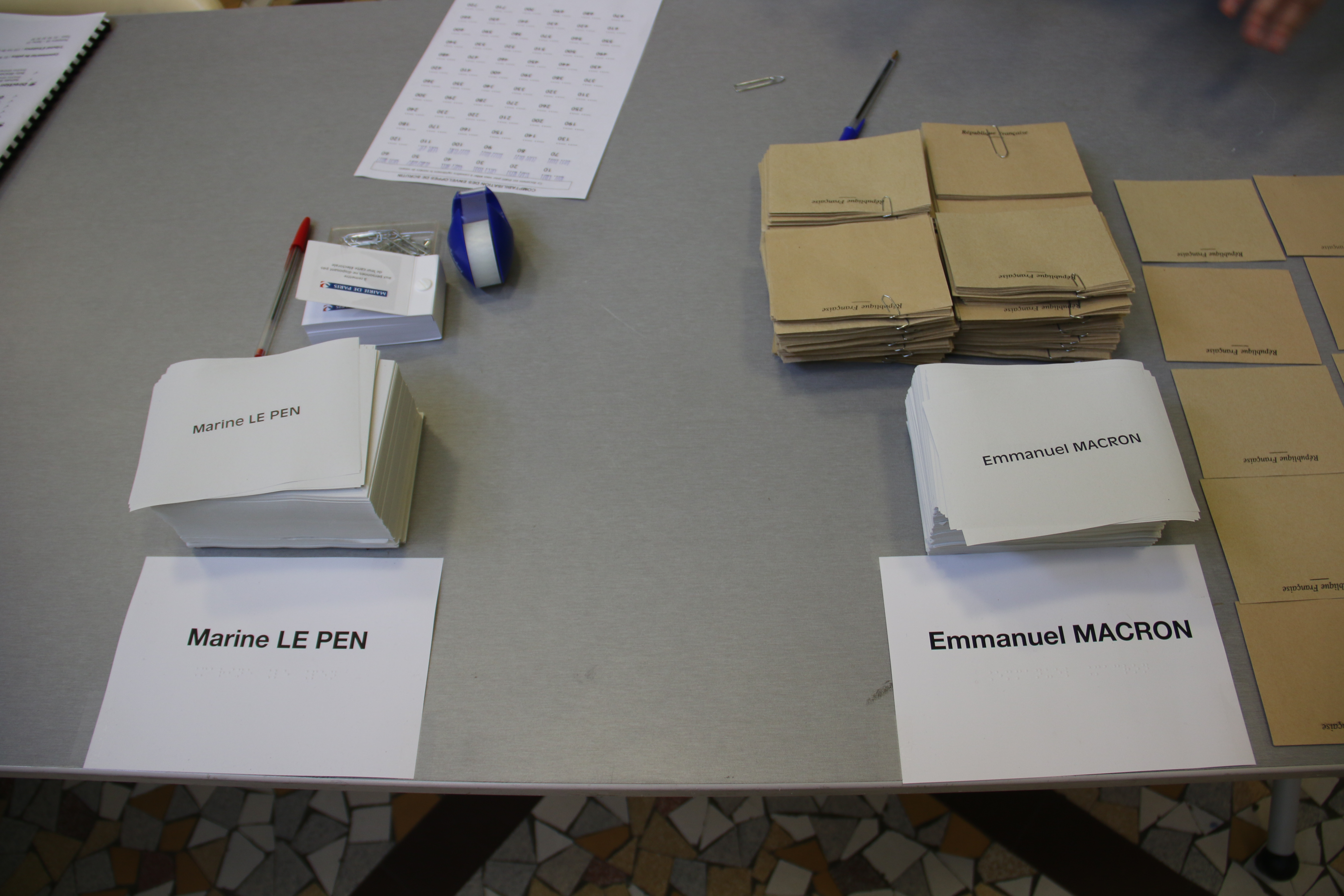
Voting cards for the second round.

On the evening of the first round, Macron and members of his entourage celebrated the result at La Rotonde, a brasserie in the 6th arrondissement of Paris; the move was criticized as premature and complacent, viewed as reminiscent of Nicolas Sarkozy's widely criticized post-election celebration at Fouquet's in 2007. On 24 April, Le Pen vacated her position as leader of the National Front on 24 April to focus on her presidential candidacy but remained a member of the party. On 26 April, while Macron met with union representatives in his hometown of Amiens employed at the local Whirlpool factory, slated to close in 2018, Le Pen arrived at the site of the factory outdoors around noon in a visit to speak with workers, catching Macron by surprise. When Macron subsequently arrived at the factory site in mid-afternoon, he was whistled and heckled by a hostile crowd, with some shouting "Marine présidente", before he subsequently spoke with the workers for half an hour.

The official campaign ended at midnight on 5 May. Just minutes before the election silence went into effect, emails and documents from the Macron campaign were leaked on a file-sharing website. The campaign team subsequently issued a statement claiming that they had been compromised, and alleged that the leak contained both real as well and some fabricated documents. Numerama, an online publication focusing on digital life, described the leaked material as "utterly mundane", consisting of "the contents of a hard drive and several emails of co-workers and En Marche political officials." Leaked documents included "memos, bills, loans for amounts that are hardly over-the-top, recommendations and other reservations, amidst, of course, exchanges that are strictly personal and private — personal notes on the rain and sunshine, a confirmation email for the publishing of a book, reservation of a table for friends, etc.", in addition to some documents unrelated to Macron.

Voting in the second round took place on Saturday 6 May from 08:00 to 19:00 (local time) in the French overseas departments and territories situated east of the International Date Line and west of metropolitan France (i.e. French Guiana, French Polynesia, Guadeloupe, Martinique, Saint Martin, Saint Barthélemy and Saint Pierre and Miquelon), as well as at French diplomatic missions in the Americas. Voting in metropolitan France (as well as the French overseas departments and territories of Mayotte, New Caledonia, Réunion and Wallis and Futuna, and French diplomatic missions outside the Americas) took place on Sunday 7 May from 08:00 to 19:00 or 20:00 (local time). The results of the second round were officially proclaimed on 10 May.

=== Debate ===
Though TF1 initially had plans to hold its own debate between the first and second round, it instead jointly hosted one with France 2. BFM TV also originally intended to host a debate between the two rounds, and it sought to join France 2 and TF1 in co-hosting a single debate but was rebuffed; while all channels were welcome to broadcast the debate, CEO of France Télévisions Delphine Ernotte said, it would not accept such an arrangement with BFM TV, which would mean three journalists moderating the debate. Unlike Jacques Chirac, who refused to debate Jean-Marie Le Pen after the latter's surprise advancement to the second round in the 2002 presidential election, Macron agreed to debate Marine Le Pen on 3 May. The debate, planned to start at 21:00 CEST and last 2 hours and 20 minutes, was originally to be moderated by Gilles Bouleau and David Pujadas; however, after the Conseil supérieur de l'audiovisuel (CSA) raised concerns that the moderators would both be men for the first time since 1995, the final pair of Christophe Jakubyszyn of TF1 and Nathalie Saint-Cricq of France 2 was chosen. A total of 16.5 million people (60% of the audience share) watched the debate.

The debate was considered to have significantly damaged the image of Le Pen and the FN before the second round of the election, with Le Pen criticized for being overly aggressive, arrogant, and amateur in the topics at hand, and was also attributed as a cause of the poor performance of the FN in the subsequent legislative elections.

2017 French presidential election second-round debate
Date	Organizers	Moderators	P Present		Notes
Date	Organizers	Moderators	Macron	Le Pen	Notes
3 May; 21:00 CEST	TF1; France 2	Christophe Jakubyszyn; Nathalie Saint-Cricq	P	P	
Candidate viewed as "most convincing"
Debate		Poll source	Macron	Le Pen	Notes
3 May TF1/France 2		Elabe	63%	34%	
3 May TF1/France 2		Harris*	42%	26%	
3 May TF1/France 2		Ifop-Fiducial*	45%	29%	
3 May TF1/France 2		Odoxa*	48%	19%	
* Elabe poll among viewers; Harris and Ifop-Fiducial polls among those aware of debate; Odoxa poll among a representative sample of the French population

=== Electorate ===
Sociology of the electorate
Demographic	Macron	Le Pen	Blank/null votes	Turnout
Total vote	66.1%	33.9%	11.5%	74.6%
First-round presidential election vote
François Fillon	48%	20%	15%	83%
Jean-Luc Mélenchon	52%	7%	17%	76%
Benoît Hamon	71%	2%	10%	83%
Nicolas Dupont-Aignan	27%	30%	20%	77%
Political party
EXG	59%	41%	–	60%
FG	80%	20%	–	72%
EELV	89%	11%	–	74%
PS	94%	6%	–	85%
EM	100%	0%	–	91%
MoDem	85%	15%	–	81%
UDI	85%	15%	–	87%
LR	70%	30%	–	78%
FN	3%	97%	–	82%
None	62%	38%	–	59%
Self-described political position
Very left-wing	77%	23%	–	62%
Left-wing	95%	5%	–	82%
Rather left-wing	91%	9%	–	79%
Centre	89%	11%	–	83%
Rather right-wing	76%	24%	–	78%
Right-wing	47%	53%	–	79%
Very right-wing	2%	98%	–	86%
Neither left nor right	48%	52%	–	63%
Left subtotal	92%	8%	–	79%
Right subtotal	47%	53%	–	63%
Sex
Men	62%	38%	–	73%
Women	68%	32%	–	76%
Age
18–24 years old	66%	34%	–	66%
25–34 years old	60%	40%	–	68%
35–49 years old	57%	43%	–	73%
50–59 years old	64%	36%	–	76%
60–69 years old	70%	30%	–	81%
70 or older	78%	22%	–	82%
Socio-occupational classification
Manager/professional	82%	18%	–	76%
Intermediate occupation	67%	33%	–	75%
White-collar worker	54%	46%	–	70%
Blue-collar worker	44%	56%	–	68%
Retired	74%	26%	–	83%
Employment status
Employee	62%	38%	–	73%
Private employee	63%	37%	–	72%
Public employee	61%	39%	–	75%
Self-employed	57%	43%	–	69%
Unemployed	53%	47%	–	65%
Education
Less than baccalauréat	55%	45%	–	73%
Baccalauréat	64%	36%	–	72%
Bac +2	69%	31%	–	77%
At least bac +3	81%	19%	–	78%
Monthly household income
Less than €1,250	55%	45%	–	66%
€1,250 to €2,000	59%	41%	–	75%
€2,000 to €3,000	64%	36%	–	76%
More than €3,000	75%	25%	–	80%
Level of financial security with current income
Very difficult	31%	69%	–	73%
Difficult	61%	39%	–	72%
Easily	79%	21%	–	78%
Future of the young generation
Better	80%	20%	–	80%
Worse	59%	41%	–	74%
Neither better nor worse	79%	21%	–	77%
Agglomeration
Rural	57%	43%	–	77%
Fewer than 20,000 inhabitants	65%	35%	–	75%
20,000 to 100,000 inhabitants	62%	38%	–	76%
More than 100,000 inhabitants	72%	28%	–	73%
Religion
Catholic	63%	37%	–	78%
Regular practitioner	66%	34%	–	82%
Occasional practitioner	66%	34%	–	78%
Non-practitioner	62%	38%	–	77%
Others	72%	28%	–	69%
None	68%	32%	–	71%
Demographic				Turnout
Demographic	Macron	Le Pen	Blank/null votes	Turnout
Sociology of the electorate
Source: Ipsos France

== Opinion polls ==
First round

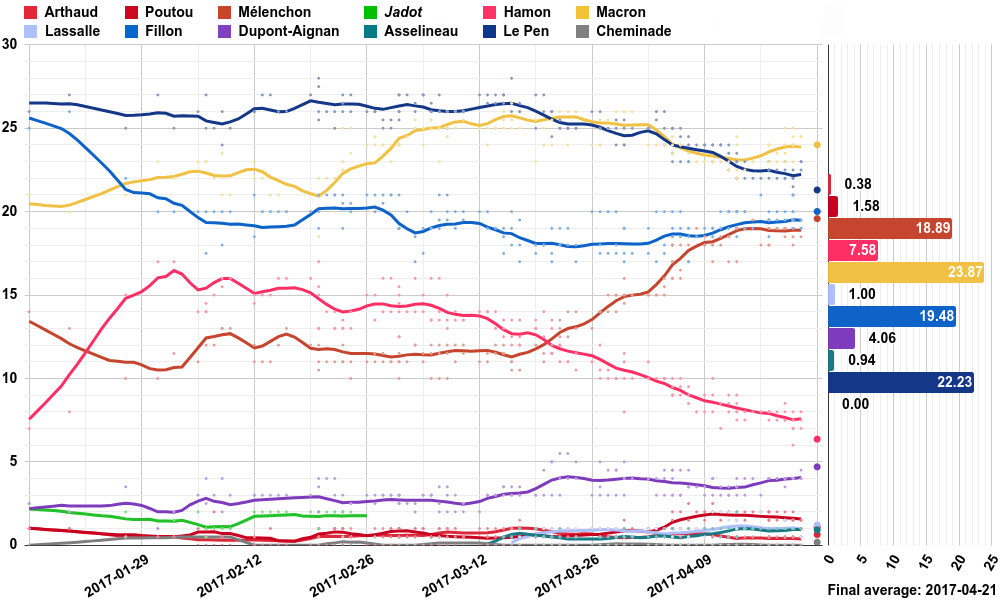

Second round

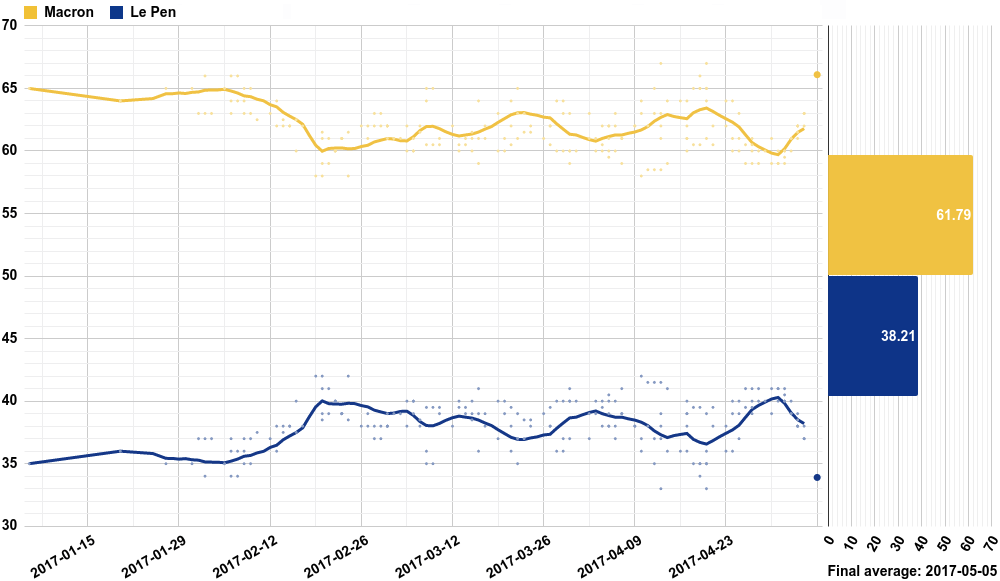

== Results ==
Candidate	Party	First round		Second round	
Candidate	Party	Votes	%	Votes	%
Emmanuel Macron	La République En Marche!	8,656,346	24.01	20,743,128	66.10
Marine Le Pen	National Front	7,678,491	21.30	10,638,475	33.90
François Fillon	The Republicans	7,212,995	20.01		
Jean-Luc Mélenchon	La France Insoumise	7,059,951	19.58		
Benoît Hamon	Socialist Party	2,291,288	6.36		
Nicolas Dupont-Aignan	Debout la France	1,695,000	4.70		
Jean Lassalle	Résistons!	435,301	1.21		
Philippe Poutou	New Anticapitalist Party	394,505	1.09		
François Asselineau	Popular Republican Union	332,547	0.92		
Nathalie Arthaud	Workers' Struggle	232,384	0.64		
Jacques Cheminade	Solidarity and Progress	65,586	0.18		
Total		36,054,394	100.00	31,381,603	100.00
Valid votes		36,054,394	97.43	31,381,603	88.48
Invalid votes		289,337	0.78	1,064,225	3.00
Blank votes		659,997	1.78	3,021,499	8.52
Total votes		37,003,728	100.00	35,467,327	100.00
Registered voters/turnout		47,582,183	77.77	47,568,693	74.56
Source: Constitutional Council (First round · Second round)

=== First round ===
==== By department ====
Department	Emmanuel Macron		Marine Le Pen		François Fillon		Jean-Luc Mélenchon		Benoît Hamon		Nicolas Dupont-Aignan		Jean Lassalle		Philippe Poutou		François Asselineau		Nathalie Arthaud		Jacques Cheminade	
Department	Votes	%	Votes	%	Votes	%	Votes	%	Votes	%	Votes	%	Votes	%	Votes	%	Votes	%	Votes	%	Votes	%
Ain	73,692	22.62	81,455	25.00	69,805	21.43	51,736	15.88	16,711	5.13	19,788	6.07	3,465	1.06	3,098	0.95	3,612	1.11	1,842	0.57	595	0.18
Aisne	51,680	17.94	102,770	35.67	46,969	16.30	48,950	16.99	12,230	4.24	14,651	5.08	2,264	0.79	3,156	1.10	2,171	0.75	2,763	0.96	536	0.19
Allier	45,651	23.72	43,004	22.34	36,457	18.94	38,311	19.91	10,619	5.52	9,795	5.09	2,986	1.55	2,322	1.21	1,422	0.74	1,540	0.80	353	0.18
Alpes-de-Haute-Provence	19,960	20.02	24,463	24.53	18,442	18.49	22,448	22.51	4,983	5.00	4,861	4.87	1,721	1.73	1,178	1.18	932	0.93	521	0.52	205	0.21
Hautes-Alpes	18,948	21.80	18,474	21.25	16,645	19.15	18,796	21.62	5,109	5.88	4,938	5.68	1,609	1.85	1,049	1.21	783	0.90	411	0.47	165	0.19
Alpes-Maritimes	111,953	19.04	163,141	27.75	161,036	27.39	87,941	14.96	21,067	3.58	25,175	4.28	5,262	0.90	3,622	0.62	6,067	1.03	1,729	0.29	939	0.16
Ardèche	42,320	21.64	45,305	23.17	33,835	17.30	42,622	21.80	11,757	6.01	9,926	5.08	3,546	1.81	2,602	1.33	1,969	1.01	1,303	0.67	371	0.19
Ardennes	26,912	18.33	47,578	32.41	25,273	17.22	26,172	17.83	7,234	4.93	7,810	5.32	1,406	0.96	1,693	1.15	1,080	0.74	1,378	0.94	267	0.18
Ariège	19,523	20.92	20,247	21.70	11,892	12.75	24,970	26.76	7,326	7.85	3,369	3.61	3,304	3.54	1,180	1.26	799	0.86	556	0.60	140	0.15
Aube	30,565	18.98	48,846	30.33	37,122	23.05	22,496	13.97	6,545	4.06	10,235	6.35	1,159	0.72	1,387	0.86	1,317	0.82	1,107	0.69	289	0.18
Aude	43,015	20.07	60,585	28.26	32,281	15.06	46,126	21.52	13,614	6.35	8,265	3.86	4,642	2.17	2,507	1.17	1,783	0.83	1,195	0.56	348	0.16
Aveyron	45,584	25.83	28,588	16.20	36,664	20.78	34,689	19.66	10,878	6.16	8,554	4.85	6,461	3.66	2,322	1.32	1,304	0.74	1,106	0.63	313	0.18
Bouches-du-Rhône	203,312	19.37	286,397	27.28	207,466	19.76	231,194	22.02	47,564	4.53	40,447	3.85	10,040	0.96	8,006	0.76	9,418	0.90	4,114	0.39	1,740	0.17
Calvados	99,720	24.83	81,770	20.36	82,340	20.50	75,620	18.83	27,293	6.80	20,079	5.00	2,911	0.72	5,269	1.31	2,830	0.70	3,099	0.77	691	0.17
Cantal	24,477	26.73	16,641	18.17	21,589	23.58	14,566	15.91	4,810	5.25	4,047	4.42	2,840	3.10	1,179	1.29	527	0.58	692	0.76	198	0.22
Charente	49,889	25.07	42,598	21.40	33,744	16.96	40,755	20.48	12,569	6.32	10,008	5.03	3,085	1.55	2,724	1.37	1,540	0.77	1,651	0.83	450	0.23
Charente-Maritime	91,355	23.91	80,764	21.14	78,659	20.59	72,491	18.97	22,023	5.76	20,333	5.32	5,276	1.38	4,876	1.28	3,020	0.79	2,576	0.67	692	0.18
Cher	38,076	22.05	41,753	24.18	32,967	19.09	33,694	19.51	9,157	5.30	9,554	5.53	1,925	1.11	2,106	1.22	1,479	0.86	1,630	0.94	345	0.20
Corrèze	39,218	26.93	25,253	17.34	25,427	17.46	30,357	20.85	9,263	6.36	7,049	4.84	4,253	2.92	2,319	1.59	1,094	0.75	1,051	0.72	329	0.23
Corse-du-Sud	13,022	17.87	20,858	28.62	18,714	25.68	10,085	13.84	2,546	3.49	2,218	3.04	3,948	5.42	657	0.90	485	0.67	218	0.30	117	0.16
Haute-Corse	15,506	19.02	22,183	27.22	20,739	25.44	11,229	13.78	3,234	3.97	2,244	2.75	4,763	5.84	717	0.88	480	0.59	277	0.34	136	0.17
Côte-d'Or	67,436	23.65	64,200	22.52	60,625	21.26	50,859	17.84	16,810	5.90	14,980	5.25	2,635	0.92	2,818	0.99	2,457	0.86	1,795	0.63	509	0.18
Côtes-d'Armor	104,969	27.99	61,703	16.46	68,916	18.38	76,013	20.27	32,260	8.60	15,958	4.26	3,554	0.95	5,468	1.46	2,479	0.66	3,028	0.81	621	0.17
Creuse	15,807	22.50	13,966	19.88	12,637	17.99	14,827	21.11	5,494	7.82	3,521	5.01	1,352	1.92	1,209	1.72	580	0.83	684	0.97	174	0.25
Dordogne	55,945	22.49	52,044	20.93	42,510	17.09	57,132	22.97	15,783	6.35	11,424	4.59	6,050	2.43	3,578	1.44	2,128	0.86	1,626	0.65	490	0.20
Doubs	63,954	22.50	66,635	23.45	59,929	21.09	50,803	17.88	16,318	5.74	14,733	5.18	2,532	0.89	3,565	1.25	3,129	1.10	2,051	0.72	530	0.19
Drôme	63,164	21.88	68,996	23.90	53,403	18.50	58,037	20.10	17,385	6.02	14,997	5.19	3,868	1.34	3,174	1.10	2,988	1.03	2,196	0.76	533	0.18
Eure	66,986	19.89	98,719	29.31	63,436	18.84	58,844	17.47	16,999	5.05	19,096	5.67	2,602	0.77	3,933	1.17	2,927	0.87	2,633	0.78	602	0.18
Eure-et-Loir	51,038	21.74	58,886	25.08	51,275	21.84	38,035	16.20	12,317	5.25	14,103	6.01	1,942	0.83	2,659	1.13	2,253	0.96	1,817	0.77	454	0.19
Finistère	164,095	29.45	77,366	13.89	99,965	17.94	109,607	19.67	60,781	10.91	22,737	4.08	6,192	1.11	8,250	1.48	3,697	0.66	3,638	0.65	857	0.15
Gard	79,006	18.78	123,273	29.30	72,366	17.20	90,905	21.61	20,473	4.87	17,808	4.23	5,946	1.41	4,044	0.96	4,096	0.97	2,092	0.50	673	0.16
Haute-Garonne	190,128	26.43	120,225	16.71	118,608	16.49	170,446	23.69	60,180	8.37	27,833	3.87	14,445	2.01	7,116	0.99	5,955	0.83	3,166	0.44	1,291	0.18
Gers	27,775	23.40	23,387	19.71	21,312	17.96	23,089	19.45	9,527	8.03	5,378	4.53	5,059	4.26	1,254	1.06	1,037	0.87	677	0.57	188	0.16
Gironde	222,287	26.13	155,319	18.26	145,283	17.08	185,888	21.85	64,300	7.56	35,530	4.18	16,460	1.93	13,233	1.56	7,013	0.82	3,980	0.47	1,527	0.18
Hérault	128,621	20.52	161,119	25.70	110,339	17.60	143,996	22.97	36,180	5.77	23,159	3.69	8,461	1.35	5,660	0.90	5,919	0.94	2,496	0.40	894	0.14
Ille-et-Vilaine	181,373	30.26	84,648	14.12	114,034	19.03	118,096	19.70	53,418	8.91	26,822	4.48	4,531	0.76	7,065	1.18	3,994	0.67	4,339	0.72	1,021	0.17
Indre	27,301	20.85	31,985	24.43	25,476	19.46	24,938	19.05	7,786	5.95	7,177	5.48	1,728	1.32	1,757	1.34	1,098	0.84	1,390	1.06	298	0.23
Indre-et-Loire	83,165	24.47	64,522	18.98	72,196	21.24	65,931	19.40	22,898	6.74	18,452	5.43	2,929	0.86	3,907	1.15	2,620	0.77	2,606	0.77	679	0.20
Isère	164,091	24.77	147,910	22.33	112,927	17.05	135,949	20.52	43,652	6.59	33,773	5.10	6,537	0.99	6,382	0.96	6,558	0.99	3,595	0.54	1,140	0.17
Jura	31,896	21.33	36,110	24.14	28,373	18.97	30,331	20.28	7,589	5.07	8,533	5.71	1,994	1.33	1,980	1.32	1,330	0.89	1,148	0.77	285	0.19
Landes	61,043	24.63	44,956	18.14	42,464	17.13	49,949	20.15	21,550	8.69	11,021	4.45	10,485	4.23	2,875	1.16	1,916	0.77	1,235	0.50	372	0.15
Loir-et-Cher	40,639	20.98	48,662	25.12	42,756	22.07	31,576	16.30	10,956	5.66	11,646	6.01	1,843	0.95	2,198	1.13	1,516	0.78	1,542	0.80	404	0.21
Loire	90,677	23.17	94,222	24.08	71,848	18.36	73,388	18.75	22,698	5.80	22,689	5.80	5,041	1.29	4,107	1.05	3,483	0.89	2,547	0.65	667	0.17
Haute-Loire	32,821	23.51	32,185	23.06	25,956	18.60	25,419	18.21	7,435	5.33	8,346	5.98	3,112	2.23	1,928	1.38	1,050	0.75	1,043	0.75	282	0.20
Loire-Atlantique	232,602	28.66	111,194	13.70	159,703	19.68	178,357	21.98	65,140	8.03	36,546	4.50	6,029	0.74	9,618	1.19	6,129	0.76	4,785	0.59	1,354	0.17
Loiret	83,506	23.48	83,662	23.53	75,655	21.28	58,134	16.35	20,438	5.75	21,128	5.94	3,203	0.90	3,655	1.03	3,109	0.87	2,380	0.67	702	0.20
Lot	29,527	26.65	17,865	16.13	18,459	16.66	26,014	23.48	7,951	7.18	4,550	4.11	3,073	2.77	1,528	1.38	871	0.79	723	0.65	226	0.20
Lot-et-Garonne	39,253	20.79	47,271	25.03	34,828	18.44	36,018	19.08	10,639	5.63	9,407	4.98	6,083	3.22	2,292	1.21	1,660	0.88	1,044	0.55	327	0.17
Lozère	10,463	21.73	9,097	18.89	10,986	22.82	9,483	19.70	2,733	5.68	2,197	4.56	1,764	3.66	683	1.42	354	0.74	294	0.61	93	0.19
Maine-et-Loire	121,685	26.51	77,935	16.98	108,888	23.73	78,293	17.06	29,553	6.44	25,321	5.52	3,483	0.76	5,696	1.24	3,439	0.75	3,860	0.84	805	0.18
Manche	74,683	24.86	61,620	20.51	64,909	21.60	51,026	16.98	19,238	6.40	17,052	5.68	2,520	0.84	4,134	1.38	2,048	0.68	2,593	0.86	623	0.21
Marne	60,958	20.75	82,473	28.07	65,081	22.15	44,424	15.12	13,683	4.66	16,896	5.75	2,350	0.80	2,762	0.94	2,441	0.83	2,176	0.74	525	0.18
Haute-Marne	18,438	18.00	34,027	33.22	19,590	19.12	15,380	15.01	4,292	4.19	6,417	6.26	1,126	1.10	1,233	1.20	813	0.79	926	0.90	198	0.19
Mayenne	46,938	26.04	30,465	16.90	48,772	27.06	26,798	14.87	10,247	5.69	10,107	5.61	1,525	0.85	2,242	1.24	1,182	0.66	1,627	0.90	329	0.18
Meurthe-et-Moselle	83,703	22.04	98,194	25.86	62,654	16.50	77,400	20.38	23,632	6.22	19,331	5.09	3,236	0.85	4,483	1.18	3,458	0.91	2,942	0.77	733	0.19
Meuse	20,713	19.35	34,602	32.32	19,287	18.02	16,020	14.97	4,918	4.59	6,802	6.35	1,294	1.21	1,430	1.34	856	0.80	886	0.83	237	0.22
Morbihan	130,639	27.86	82,927	17.69	97,900	20.88	82,020	17.49	34,368	7.33	22,411	4.78	4,820	1.03	6,309	1.35	3,249	0.69	3,291	0.70	901	0.19
Moselle	117,738	21.05	158,542	28.35	96,003	17.17	100,118	17.90	29,480	5.27	32,525	5.82	5,763	1.03	6,975	1.25	5,977	1.07	4,929	0.88	1,167	0.21
Nièvre	27,356	22.71	29,817	24.76	20,773	17.25	23,079	19.16	7,854	6.52	6,446	5.35	1,365	1.13	1,547	1.28	959	0.80	1,004	0.83	234	0.19
Nord	268,723	19.85	382,030	28.22	226,710	16.75	288,115	21.28	76,531	5.65	65,245	4.82	8,535	0.63	13,151	0.97	11,450	0.85	10,975	0.81	2,338	0.17
Oise	86,680	19.80	135,188	30.88	76,783	17.54	77,415	17.68	20,525	4.69	23,936	5.47	3,414	0.78	4,682	1.07	4,666	1.07	3,677	0.84	827	0.19
Orne	35,815	21.57	39,532	23.81	41,084	24.74	24,542	14.78	8,659	5.21	9,644	5.81	1,480	0.89	2,147	1.29	1,291	0.78	1,513	0.91	350	0.21
Pas-de-Calais	153,682	18.45	286,147	34.35	119,077	14.29	159,342	19.13	43,084	5.17	41,427	4.97	5,832	0.70	9,002	1.08	5,484	0.66	8,667	1.04	1,408	0.17
Puy-de-Dôme	96,797	27.15	63,030	17.68	58,432	16.39	78,417	21.99	25,814	7.24	15,635	4.38	7,348	2.06	4,730	1.33	2,910	0.82	2,699	0.76	755	0.21
Pyrénées-Atlantiques	103,958	26.28	54,376	13.74	71,858	18.16	78,803	19.92	30,589	7.73	14,727	3.72	29,882	7.55	6,371	1.61	2,782	0.70	1,799	0.45	508	0.13
Hautes-Pyrénées	35,070	25.11	25,947	18.57	20,220	14.48	32,148	23.01	9,935	7.11	5,876	4.21	6,928	4.96	1,575	1.13	1,023	0.73	767	0.55	200	0.14
Pyrénées-Orientales	49,245	18.46	80,169	30.05	45,865	17.19	56,392	21.14	13,455	5.04	9,741	3.65	4,634	1.74	3,053	1.14	2,303	0.86	1,477	0.55	453	0.17
Bas-Rhin	133,347	22.29	147,714	24.70	131,564	22.00	88,420	14.78	31,931	5.34	39,299	6.57	6,420	1.07	6,549	1.09	6,841	1.14	4,823	0.81	1,197	0.20
Haut-Rhin	79,798	19.76	109,704	27.16	90,237	22.34	57,856	14.32	18,694	4.63	28,562	7.07	5,004	1.24	4,727	1.17	5,217	1.29	3,101	0.77	1,010	0.25
Rhône	236,137	26.58	144,476	16.26	205,781	23.16	175,051	19.70	60,094	6.76	38,429	4.33	6,703	0.75	7,146	0.80	9,188	1.03	4,061	0.46	1,446	0.16
Haute-Saône	27,332	19.59	43,753	31.36	25,184	18.05	22,150	15.88	6,596	4.73	8,176	5.86	1,512	1.08	2,021	1.45	1,206	0.86	1,325	0.95	267	0.19
Saône-et-Loire	69,212	22.33	75,258	24.28	60,100	19.39	55,249	17.83	19,184	6.19	18,961	6.12	3,153	1.02	3,588	1.16	2,535	0.82	2,201	0.71	510	0.16
Sarthe	64,618	20.04	67,083	20.80	92,261	28.61	56,851	17.63	17,195	5.33	13,657	4.24	2,141	0.66	3,565	1.11	2,074	0.64	2,452	0.76	547	0.17
Savoie	55,871	23.13	52,448	21.71	50,815	21.04	45,013	18.63	13,752	5.69	13,673	5.66	3,152	1.30	2,578	1.07	2,608	1.08	1,219	0.50	430	0.18
Haute-Savoie	100,174	24.23	77,919	18.84	105,057	25.41	67,079	16.22	21,805	5.27	24,785	5.99	4,649	1.12	4,263	1.03	5,021	1.21	1,919	0.46	827	0.20
Paris	375,006	34.83	53,719	4.99	284,744	26.45	210,548	19.56	109,550	10.18	17,997	1.67	5,490	0.51	6,799	0.63	8,337	0.77	2,897	0.27	1,472	0.14
Seine-Maritime	145,756	21.23	170,945	24.90	118,336	17.24	152,394	22.20	41,516	6.05	33,036	4.81	4,383	0.64	8,321	1.21	5,205	0.76	5,356	0.78	1,278	0.19
Seine-et-Marne	157,314	23.11	155,521	22.85	120,968	17.77	141,827	20.84	38,772	5.70	41,505	6.10	5,182	0.76	6,354	0.93	8,195	1.20	3,706	0.54	1,247	0.18
Yvelines	219,063	28.86	98,024	12.92	206,835	27.25	126,345	16.65	52,564	6.93	32,906	4.34	5,371	0.71	5,448	0.72	8,148	1.07	2,872	0.38	1,358	0.18
Deux-Sèvres	57,826	26.97	38,640	18.02	40,195	18.75	41,609	19.41	14,950	6.97	11,356	5.30	2,599	1.21	3,483	1.62	1,478	0.69	1,869	0.87	393	0.18
Somme	69,520	21.75	97,081	30.37	51,834	16.22	59,491	18.61	14,260	4.46	15,462	4.84	2,365	0.74	3,661	1.15	2,272	0.71	3,111	0.97	579	0.18
Tarn	51,755	22.14	52,402	22.42	41,052	17.56	48,094	20.57	15,530	6.64	11,440	4.89	7,105	3.04	2,721	1.16	1,822	0.78	1,397	0.60	439	0.19
Tarn-et-Garonne	30,319	20.65	39,183	26.69	25,992	17.71	27,841	18.97	8,567	5.84	7,233	4.93	3,660	2.49	1,573	1.07	1,337	0.91	830	0.57	266	0.18
Var	108,597	17.73	186,376	30.43	152,316	24.87	94,184	15.38	21,089	3.44	29,177	4.76	6,933	1.13	4,655	0.76	5,860	0.96	2,274	0.37	977	0.16
Vaucluse	58,208	18.52	95,930	30.53	59,619	18.97	60,852	19.37	13,553	4.31	14,452	4.60	3,989	1.27	2,804	0.89	2,890	0.92	1,388	0.44	543	0.17
Vendée	109,989	26.26	77,590	18.53	106,804	25.50	63,156	15.08	21,356	5.10	24,211	5.78	3,810	0.91	5,219	1.25	2,705	0.65	3,294	0.79	696	0.17
Vienne	59,146	24.88	47,024	19.78	42,703	17.96	49,061	20.64	16,861	7.09	11,920	5.01	2,861	1.20	3,642	1.53	1,896	0.80	2,074	0.87	560	0.24
Haute-Vienne	55,577	26.67	37,937	18.20	32,522	15.60	46,549	22.33	16,136	7.74	9,285	4.46	3,518	1.69	3,044	1.46	1,557	0.75	1,850	0.89	440	0.21
Vosges	43,604	19.86	63,924	29.12	39,579	18.03	36,524	16.64	10,887	4.96	14,323	6.53	2,750	1.25	3,229	1.47	2,223	1.01	2,004	0.91	455	0.21
Yonne	36,234	19.63	52,640	28.52	36,739	19.91	30,815	16.70	8,846	4.79	11,668	6.32	1,987	1.08	2,128	1.15	1,775	0.96	1,380	0.75	341	0.18
Territoire de Belfort	14,771	20.64	19,249	26.89	12,668	17.70	13,672	19.10	4,189	5.85	3,770	5.27	669	0.93	886	1.24	941	1.31	592	0.83	167	0.23
Essonne	163,389	26.21	102,461	16.43	112,478	18.04	136,392	21.88	42,072	6.75	44,793	7.18	4,468	0.72	5,755	0.92	7,514	1.21	2,924	0.47	1,241	0.20
Hauts-de-Seine	256,687	32.30	60,731	7.64	231,553	29.14	145,289	18.28	57,114	7.19	21,359	2.69	4,747	0.60	5,033	0.63	8,453	1.06	2,447	0.31	1,345	0.17
Seine-Saint-Denis	130,103	24.04	73,534	13.59	69,063	12.76	184,123	34.02	45,506	8.41	16,601	3.07	3,160	0.58	6,050	1.12	8,739	1.61	3,235	0.60	1,088	0.20
Val-de-Marne	172,202	28.33	69,878	11.50	122,814	20.21	149,112	24.53	47,228	7.77	26,252	4.32	3,957	0.65	5,226	0.86	7,303	1.20	2,749	0.45	1,066	0.18
Val-d'Oise	138,752	25.31	94,158	17.18	101,131	18.45	131,342	23.96	37,518	6.84	24,790	4.52	3,975	0.73	5,040	0.92	7,702	1.41	2,752	0.50	978	0.18
Guadeloupe	33,930	30.23	15,159	13.51	16,305	14.53	27,081	24.13	11,165	9.95	2,042	1.82	650	0.58	2,300	2.05	1,312	1.17	1,972	1.76	326	0.29
Martinique	27,893	25.53	11,949	10.94	18,400	16.84	29,903	27.37	10,661	9.76	2,338	2.14	870	0.80	3,217	2.94	1,407	1.29	2,253	2.06	373	0.34
French Guiana	5,031	18.75	6,521	24.30	3,935	14.66	6,633	24.71	1,529	5.70	472	1.76	273	1.02	1,405	5.23	480	1.79	462	1.72	98	0.37
Réunion	66,292	18.91	82,219	23.46	60,508	17.26	85,987	24.53	26,872	7.67	10,123	2.89	1,939	0.55	4,377	1.25	6,029	1.72	5,190	1.48	944	0.27
Mayotte	6,364	19.21	9,008	27.19	10,808	32.62	2,789	8.42	1,434	4.33	1,019	3.08	182	0.55	621	1.87	408	1.23	334	1.01	163	0.49
New Caledonia	11,089	12.75	25,290	29.09	27,065	31.13	7,703	8.86	8,125	9.34	2,521	2.90	695	0.80	1,284	1.48	2,098	2.41	836	0.96	240	0.28
French Polynesia	11,119	14.70	24,604	32.54	26,679	35.28	5,952	7.87	2,203	2.91	1,767	2.34	447	0.59	755	1.00	1,206	1.59	689	0.91	201	0.27
Saint Pierre and Miquelon	473	17.97	478	18.16	261	9.92	933	35.45	217	8.24	79	3.00	54	2.05	64	2.43	36	1.37	28	1.06	9	0.34
Wallis and Futuna	1,630	30.48	380	7.11	1,526	28.53	192	3.59	1,349	25.22	79	1.48	29	0.54	41	0.77	50	0.93	54	1.01	18	0.34
Saint Martin/Saint Barthélemy	1,572	19.99	1,834	23.32	2,518	32.02	1,153	14.66	247	3.14	216	2.75	68	0.86	92	1.17	112	1.42	35	0.45	18	0.23
French residents overseas	223,879	40.40	35,926	6.48	145,829	26.32	87,692	15.83	38,092	6.87	8,837	1.59	2,530	0.46	3,414	0.62	5,578	1.01	1,312	0.24	1,030	0.19
Total	8,656,346	24.01	7,678,491	21.30	7,212,995	20.01	7,059,951	19.58	2,291,288	6.36	1,695,000	4.70	435,301	1.21	394,505	1.09	332,547	0.92	232,384	0.64	65,586	0.18
Source: Ministry of the Interior

==== By region ====
Region	Emmanuel Macron		Marine Le Pen		François Fillon		Jean-Luc Mélenchon		Benoît Hamon		Nicolas Dupont-Aignan		Jean Lassalle		Philippe Poutou		François Asselineau		Nathalie Arthaud		Jacques Cheminade	
Region	Votes	%	Votes	%	Votes	%	Votes	%	Votes	%	Votes	%	Votes	%	Votes	%	Votes	%	Votes	%	Votes	%
Auvergne-Rhône-Alpes	1,025,872	24.50	867,591	20.72	845,905	20.20	805,588	19.24	256,532	6.13	215,883	5.16	53,247	1.27	43,509	1.04	41,336	0.99	24,656	0.59	7,597	0.18
Bourgogne-Franche-Comté	338,191	21.89	387,662	25.09	304,391	19.70	276,958	17.93	87,386	5.66	87,267	5.65	15,847	1.03	18,533	1.20	14,332	0.93	11,496	0.74	2,843	0.18
Brittany	581,076	29.05	306,644	15.33	380,815	19.04	385,736	19.28	180,827	9.04	87,928	4.40	19,097	0.95	27,092	1.35	13,419	0.67	14,296	0.71	3,400	0.17
Centre-Val de Loire	323,725	22.68	329,470	23.08	300,325	21.04	252,308	17.67	83,552	5.85	82,060	5.75	13,570	0.95	16,282	1.14	12,075	0.85	11,365	0.80	2,882	0.20
Corsica	28,528	18.48	43,041	27.88	39,453	25.56	21,314	13.81	5,780	3.74	4,462	2.89	8,711	5.64	1,374	0.89	965	0.63	495	0.32	253	0.16
Grand Est	615,776	20.72	825,604	27.78	586,390	19.73	484,810	16.31	151,296	5.09	182,200	6.13	30,508	1.03	34,468	1.16	30,223	1.02	24,272	0.82	6,078	0.20
Hauts-de-France	630,285	19.50	1,003,216	31.04	521,373	16.13	633,313	19.59	166,630	5.15	160,721	4.97	22,410	0.69	33,652	1.04	26,043	0.81	29,193	0.90	5,688	0.18
Île-de-France	1,612,516	28.63	708,026	12.57	1,249,586	22.19	1,224,978	21.75	430,324	7.64	226,203	4.02	36,350	0.65	45,705	0.81	64,391	1.14	23,582	0.42	9,795	0.17
Normandy	422,960	22.36	452,586	23.93	370,105	19.57	362,426	19.16	113,705	6.01	98,907	5.23	13,896	0.73	23,804	1.26	14,301	0.76	15,194	0.80	3,544	0.19
Nouvelle-Aquitaine	851,304	25.12	640,148	18.89	602,830	17.79	703,439	20.75	240,157	7.09	155,581	4.59	91,904	2.71	49,646	1.46	26,664	0.79	21,439	0.63	6,262	0.18
Occitanie	740,031	22.32	762,087	22.98	566,036	17.07	734,193	22.14	216,349	6.52	135,403	4.08	75,482	2.28	35,216	1.06	28,603	0.86	16,776	0.51	5,524	0.17
Pays de la Loire	575,832	26.27	364,267	16.62	516,428	23.56	403,455	18.41	143,491	6.55	109,842	5.01	16,988	0.78	26,340	1.20	15,529	0.71	16,018	0.73	3,731	0.17
Provence-Alpes-Côte d'Azur	520,978	18.94	774,781	28.16	615,524	22.38	515,415	18.74	113,365	4.12	119,050	4.33	29,554	1.07	21,314	0.77	25,950	0.94	10,437	0.38	4,569	0.17
Guadeloupe	33,930	30.23	15,159	13.51	16,305	14.53	27,081	24.13	11,165	9.95	2,042	1.82	650	0.58	2,300	2.05	1,312	1.17	1,972	1.76	326	0.29
Martinique	27,893	25.53	11,949	10.94	18,400	16.84	29,903	27.37	10,661	9.76	2,338	2.14	870	0.80	3,217	2.94	1,407	1.29	2,253	2.06	373	0.34
French Guiana	5,031	18.75	6,521	24.30	3,935	14.66	6,633	24.71	1,529	5.70	472	1.76	273	1.02	1,405	5.23	480	1.79	462	1.72	98	0.37
Réunion	66,292	18.91	82,219	23.46	60,508	17.26	85,987	24.53	26,872	7.67	10,123	2.89	1,939	0.55	4,377	1.25	6,029	1.72	5,190	1.48	944	0.27
Mayotte	6,364	19.21	9,008	27.19	10,808	32.62	2,789	8.42	1,434	4.33	1,019	3.08	182	0.55	621	1.87	408	1.23	334	1.01	163	0.49
Source: Ministry of the Interior

==== Maps ====

Second-place candidate by department

First-place candidate by constituency

First-place candidate by commune (2012 borders)

First-place candidate by country (overseas French)

First-place candidate in the arrondissements of Paris

Support for Macron by department and major city

Support for Le Pen by department and major city

Support for Fillon by department and major city

Support for Mélenchon by department and major city

=== Second round ===
==== Tables ====
Results by department
Department	Emmanuel Macron		Marine Le Pen	
Department	Votes	%	Votes	%
Ain	173,809	60.94	111,421	39.06
Aisne	119,202	47.09	133,939	52.91
Allier	106,579	63.90	60,207	36.10
Alpes-de-Haute-Provence	48,994	58.46	34,817	41.54
Hautes-Alpes	47,211	64.12	26,417	35.88
Alpes-Maritimes	278,407	55.35	224,544	44.65
Ardèche	104,599	62.37	63,109	37.63
Ardennes	64,424	50.73	62,571	49.27
Ariège	47,983	63.09	28,074	36.91
Aube	75,810	54.15	64,180	45.85
Aude	100,901	55.33	81,452	44.67
Aveyron	109,340	72.81	40,838	27.19
Bouches-du-Rhône	519,335	57.85	378,456	42.15
Calvados	232,615	67.11	114,002	32.89
Cantal	55,411	69.83	23,938	30.17
Charente	113,700	65.49	59,916	34.51
Charente-Maritime	215,465	64.84	116,854	35.16
Cher	90,376	61.17	57,358	38.83
Corrèze	88,029	71.00	35,955	29.00
Corse-du-Sud	31,139	50.59	30,415	49.41
Haute-Corse	35,680	52.28	32,567	47.72
Côte-d'Or	159,645	64.17	89,121	35.83
Côtes-d'Armor	236,953	73.47	85,554	26.53
Creuse	39,239	65.76	20,428	34.24
Dordogne	135,533	64.27	75,335	35.73
Doubs	158,304	63.77	89,935	36.23
Drôme	157,992	62.62	94,312	37.38
Eure	158,858	54.35	133,417	45.65
Eure-et-Loir	122,420	60.27	80,696	39.73
Finistère	371,332	77.33	108,890	22.67
Gard	194,989	54.75	161,125	45.25
Haute-Garonne	436,665	72.38	166,595	27.62
Gers	67,571	66.91	33,424	33.09
Gironde	515,491	70.06	220,261	29.94
Hérault	312,419	59.22	215,147	40.78
Ille-et-Vilaine	403,347	77.67	115,942	22.33
Indre	68,173	60.98	43,627	39.02
Indre-et-Loire	201,211	69.23	89,438	30.77
Isère	383,197	65.81	199,097	34.19
Jura	79,268	61.37	49,888	38.63
Landes	146,619	68.74	66,661	31.26
Loir-et-Cher	100,789	60.47	65,896	39.53
Loire	218,603	63.86	123,714	36.14
Haute-Loire	76,233	63.35	44,112	36.65
Loire-Atlantique	525,200	77.17	155,353	22.83
Loiret	195,004	63.16	113,735	36.84
Lot	66,937	72.18	25,802	27.82
Lot-et-Garonne	97,418	59.47	66,393	40.53
Lozère	26,994	67.03	13,275	32.97
Maine-et-Loire	288,817	72.82	107,781	27.18
Manche	176,664	67.23	86,126	32.77
Marne	144,840	57.01	109,227	42.99
Haute-Marne	45,192	50.48	44,331	49.52
Mayenne	112,192	72.02	43,581	27.98
Meurthe-et-Moselle	198,750	60.66	128,902	39.34
Meuse	48,303	51.62	45,267	48.38
Morbihan	289,594	71.56	115,076	28.44
Moselle	282,717	57.66	207,597	42.34
Nièvre	62,722	59.92	41,946	40.08
Nord	669,806	56.90	507,434	43.10
Oise	202,509	53.28	177,549	46.72
Orne	88,484	61.64	55,070	38.36
Pas-de-Calais	352,558	47.94	382,782	52.06
Puy-de-Dôme	219,437	71.34	88,155	28.66
Pyrénées-Atlantiques	253,617	74.81	85,377	25.19
Hautes-Pyrénées	79,794	68.19	37,225	31.81
Pyrénées-Orientales	118,644	52.84	105,874	47.16
Bas-Rhin	330,941	63.07	193,788	36.93
Haut-Rhin	203,599	57.97	147,599	42.03
Rhône	572,015	73.59	205,317	26.41
Haute-Saône	63,541	51.71	59,341	48.29
Saône-et-Loire	166,945	61.63	103,925	38.37
Sarthe	170,153	63.33	98,523	36.67
Savoie	135,118	64.74	73,598	35.26
Haute-Savoie	249,198	68.66	113,746	31.34
Paris	849,257	89.68	97,770	10.32
Seine-Maritime	355,441	60.42	232,857	39.58
Seine-et-Marne	369,762	63.86	209,221	36.14
Yvelines	503,661	77.15	149,138	22.85
Deux-Sèvres	135,827	71.54	54,039	28.46
Somme	153,326	54.22	129,465	45.78
Tarn	125,591	63.61	71,856	36.39
Tarn-et-Garonne	71,988	57.52	53,166	42.48
Var	266,724	50.85	257,769	49.15
Vaucluse	145,965	53.45	127,113	46.55
Vendée	253,914	69.96	109,035	30.04
Vienne	143,712	68.77	65,255	31.23
Haute-Vienne	126,418	70.95	51,763	29.05
Vosges	106,076	55.26	85,894	44.74
Yonne	88,939	55.04	72,651	44.96
Territoire de Belfort	36,345	58.18	26,128	41.82
Essonne	382,650	72.18	147,509	27.82
Hauts-de-Seine	590,963	85.65	99,032	14.35
Seine-Saint-Denis	367,823	78.82	98,825	21.18
Val-de-Marne	419,145	80.32	102,673	19.68
Val-d'Oise	342,018	72.53	129,518	27.47
Guadeloupe	100,635	75.13	33,310	24.87
Martinique	104,307	77.55	30,195	22.45
French Guiana	21,769	64.89	11,777	35.11
Réunion	212,081	60.25	139,917	39.75
Mayotte	19,140	57.11	14,374	42.89
New Caledonia	47,902	52.57	43,217	47.43
French Polynesia	52,378	58.39	37,319	41.61
Saint Pierre and Miquelon	1,467	63.29	851	36.71
Wallis and Futuna	4,715	79.14	1,243	20.86
Saint Martin/Saint Barthélemy	5,282	65.03	2,840	34.97
French residents overseas	496,344	89.31	59,415	10.69
Total	20,743,128	66.10	10,638,475	33.90
Source: Ministry of the Interior

Results by region
Region	Emmanuel Macron		Marine Le Pen	
Region	Votes	%	Votes	%
Auvergne-Rhône-Alpes	2,452,191	67.13	1,200,726	32.87
Bourgogne-Franche-Comté	815,709	60.48	532,935	39.52
Brittany	1,301,226	75.36	425,462	24.64
Centre-Val de Loire	777,973	63.32	450,750	36.68
Corsica	66,819	51.48	62,982	48.52
Grand Est	1,500,652	57.94	1,089,356	42.06
Hauts-de-France	1,497,401	52.94	1,331,169	47.06
Île-de-France	3,825,279	78.73	1,033,686	21.27
Normandy	1,012,062	61.96	621,472	38.04
Nouvelle-Aquitaine	2,011,068	68.65	918,237	31.35
Occitanie	1,759,816	62.99	1,033,853	37.01
Pays de la Loire	1,350,276	72.42	514,273	27.58
Provence-Alpes-Côte d'Azur	1,306,636	55.47	1,049,116	44.53
Guadeloupe	100,635	75.13	33,310	24.87
Martinique	104,307	77.55	30,195	22.45
French Guiana	21,769	64.89	11,777	35.11
Réunion	212,081	60.25	139,917	39.75
Mayotte	19,140	57.11	14,374	42.89
Source: Ministry of the Interior

==== Maps ====
First-place candidate by department

First-place candidate by commune (2012 borders)

Vote share by department and major city

== Aftermath ==
On 8 May, Macron joined President Hollande on the Champs-Elysées to commemorate the 72nd anniversary of the surrender of Germany. The official transfer of power took place on 14 May, after which Macron nominated his prime minister and government. The legislative elections to elect the 15th National Assembly were held a month after the presidential election, with two rounds on 11 and 18 June 2017, in which En Marche! presented its candidates under the label of La République En Marche!; a list of the movement's candidates for the legislative elections was published on 11 May.

Following the second round of the presidential election on 7 May, Macron announced he would be stepping down as president of En Marche!, Le Pen announced that she would undertake a "profound transformation" of the National Front, and Mélenchon urged his supporters to mobilize in the legislative elections.

== Campaign accounts ==
The campaign accounts of the eleven candidates were submitted by 7 July 2017 and published in August 2017, and were validated and reimbursement announced by the National Commission for Campaign Accounts and Political Financing on 13 February 2018.

Candidate	1st round	Spending	€/vote	Reimbursement
Emmanuel Macron	24.01%	€16,698,320	€1.93	€10,640,794
Marine Le Pen	21.30%	€12,416,567	€1.62	€10,691,775
François Fillon	20.01%	€13,784,073	€1.91	€2,067,625
Jean-Luc Mélenchon	19.58%	€10,676,699	€1.51	€6,031,304
Benoît Hamon	6.36%	€15,072,745	€6.58	€7,949,043
Nicolas Dupont-Aignan	4.70%	€1,823,157	€1.08	€800,423
Jean Lassalle	1.21%	€260,112	€0.60	€228,659
Philippe Poutou	1.09%	€782,448	€1.98	€766,543
François Asselineau	0.92%	€1,230,843	€3.70	€755,139
Nathalie Arthaud	0.64%	€958,237	€4.12	€800,423
Jacques Cheminade	0.18%	€412,983	€6.30	€337,606

== See also ==
- President of France
- Politics of France
- French presidential elections under the Fifth Republic
