= Second French legislative constituency for citizens abroad =

Constituency of the French Fifth Republic

2nd constituency for French residents overseas
- inline Constituency of the National Assembly of France

- Deputy: Benoît Larrouquis; RE
- Department: None (overseas residents)
- Cantons: None
- Registered voters: 81,786 (2024)

The second constituency for French residents overseas (French: Deuxième circonscription des Français établis hors de France) is one of eleven constituencies representing French citizens living abroad. It was created by the 2010 redistricting of French legislative constituencies and elects, since 2012, one representative to the National Assembly.

It represents all French citizens living abroad in Mexico, the Caribbean, South America and Central America, except in territories under another country's sovereignty. It is the least populous constituency of its kind, containing 81,786 registered French voters as of 2024.

== Area ==
It covers all French citizens living in Antigua and Barbuda, Argentina, the Bahamas, Barbados, Belize, Bolivia, Brazil, Chile, Colombia, Costa Rica, Cuba, Dominica, the Dominican Republic, Ecuador, El Salvador, Grenada, Guatemala, Guyana, Haiti, Honduras, Jamaica, Mexico, Nicaragua, Panama, Paraguay, Peru, Saint Kitts and Nevis, Saint Lucia, Saint Vincent and the Grenadines, Suriname, Trinidad and Tobago, Uruguay, and Venezuela. Thus it covers every country in the Americas – other than Canada and the United States, which together constitute the first constituency. Nor does it include the French overseas departments and territories in the Americas, which are part of France and form constituencies of their own: Saint-Pierre-et-Miquelon (one constituency), Guadeloupe (four), Martinique (four) and French Guiana (two).

This constituency elected its first ever representative at the 2012 French legislative election.

== Deputies ==
Election	Member	Party
2012	Sergio Coronado	EELV
2017	Paula Forteza	LREM
2020	Paula Forteza	EDS
2022 (Note: Election was annulled due to malfunctioning online ballot.)	Éléonore Caroit	LREM
2023	Éléonore Caroit	RE
2024	Éléonore Caroit	RE
2025	Benoît Larrouquis	RE

== National Assembly elections ==
=== 2024 ===
Candidate	Party	Alliance	First round		Second round	
Candidate	Party	Alliance	Votes	%	Votes	%
Sergio Coronado	LÉ	NFP	6,952	36.16	8,725	46.73
Éléonore Caroit	RE	Ensemble	6,440	33.49	9,947	53.27
Marie-Nathalie Goncalves	RN		2,553	13.28		
Bertrand Dupont	LR	UDC	1,905	9.91		
Jessica Agostini	DVC		987	5.13		
Nora Courmontagne	REC		373	1.94		
Camille Mercier	DIV		17	0.09		
Valid votes			19,227	100.00	18,672	100.00
Blank votes			233	1.19	996	5.04
Null votes			59	0.30	86	0.44
Turnout			19,519	23.86	19,754	24.15
Abstentions			62,274	76.14	62,032	75.85
Registered voters			81,793		81,786	
Result			RE HOLD			

=== 2023 by-election ===
The election was annulled by the Constitutional Council on January 20, 2023, due to a malfunction in the organization of the online ballot. The election first round took place on 1 April, with the second round schedule for 15 April.

2023 by-election: 2nd constituency for French citizens overseas
Party	Candidate	Votes	%	±%
RE (Ensemble)	Éléonore Caroit	3,543	38.95	+4.38
LFI (NUPÉS)	Christian Rodriguez	2,386	26.23	-1.97
LR (UDC)	Bertrand Dupont	1,217	13.38	+1.13
REC	Yves Thorailler	559	6.15	−0.16
DVE	Tatiana Boteva-Malo	493	5.42	−0.66
RN	Marlon Vandamme	306	3.36	+1.50
GRS (FGR)	David Abrial	283	3.11	+1.84
PA	Catherine Bompard	192	2.11	N/A
Others	N/A	117	1.29	−
Turnout		9,382	11.92	−3.01
2nd round result
RE (Ensemble)	Éléonore Caroit	5,816	62.44	+5.02
LFI (NUPÉS)	Christian Rodriguez	3,499	37.56	−5.02
Turnout				
RE hold				

=== 2022 ===
Legislative Election 2022: 2nd constituency for French citizens overseas
Party	Candidate	Votes	%	±%
LREM (Ensemble)	Éléonore Caroit	3,836	34.57	-8.50
LFI (NUPÉS)	Christian Rodriguez	3,129	28.20	+2.22
LR (UDC)	Bertrand Dupont	1,359	12.25	+1.07
REC	Yves Thorailler	700	6.31	N/A
DVE	Tim Laurence	675	6.08	N/A
DVC	Martin Biurrun	524	4.72	N/A
RN	Léa Lefèbvre	240	2.16	+0.37
DIV	Jeoffrey Collard	227	2.05	N/A
Others	N/A	405	3.66	−
Turnout		11,095	14.93	−0.55
2nd round result
LREM (Ensemble)	Éléonore Caroit	6,737	57.42	-3.50
LFI (NUPÉS)	Christian Rodriguez	4,996	42.58	+3.50
Turnout		11,733	16.29	+3.82
LREM hold				

=== 2017 ===
Summary of the 2017 French legislative election results
Candidate	Party		1st round		2nd round	
Candidate	Party		Votes	%	Votes	%
Paula Forteza	La Republique En Marche!	REM	4,964	43.17%	5,494	60.92%
Sergio Coronado	Europe Ecology – The Greens-FI-PP	EELV	2,715	23.61%	3,525	39.08%
Pascal Drouhaud	The Republicans	LR	1,286	11.18%		
Charles-Henry Chenut	Union of Democrats and Independents	UDI	952	8.28%		
Thierry Rignol	Miscellaneous right	DVD	512	4.45%		
Jean-Marc Millet	National Front	FN	291	2.53%		
Florence Baillon	Socialist Party	PS	273	2.37%		
Martin Biurrun	Miscellaneous right	DVD	160	1.39%		
Jacques Werckmann	Independent Ecological Movement	MEI	109	0.95%		
Jean-Philippe Noël	Popular Republican Union	UPR	104	0.90%		
Lawrence Perea	Communist Party	PCF	58	0.50%		
Hai-Dang Ha-Thuc	#MyVoice		56	0.49%		
Patricio Arenas	Citizens		17	0.15%		
Palmira Pozo	Sans étiquette		2	0.02%		
Alain Videau	Sans étiquette		1	0.01%		
Total			11,500	100%	9,019	100%
Registered voters			75,029		75,022	
Blank ballots			36	0.31%	261	2.79%
Null ballots			79	0.68%	77	0.82%
Turnout			11,615	15.48%	9,357	12.47%
Abstentions			63,414	84.52%	65,665	87.53%

=== 2012 ===
==== Candidates ====
The list of candidates was officially finalised on 14 May. There were twelve candidates:

The Union for a Popular Movement chose Pascal Drouhaud, formerly the party's director of international relations.

Europe Écologie–The Greens chose Sergio Coronado (born in Chile and raised in Argentina), with Cécile Lavergne as his deputy (suppléante). He was a spokesman for Eva Joly during the 2012 presidential election campaign. Coronado was endorsed by the Socialist Party, which did not presenting a candidate of its own.

Raquel Garrido, a member of the Left Party, was the chosen candidate for the Left Front, of which she was a co-founder and which also included the French Communist Party. A lawyer, she was described as "Jean-Luc Mélenchon's international spokeswoman". Born in Chile, she moved to France with her parents after the 1973 Chilean coup d'état. In France, she became a leader of the National Union of Students, then vice-president of SOS Racisme. She was also in charge of international relations at the Workers' Force union federation, and represented France at the International Labour Organization. Her deputy (suppléant) was singer-songwriter Nilda Fernández.

The National Front chose Alain-Gérard Georgi-Samaran, a resident of Paraguay who has been "an entrepreneur in South America for more than thirty years". Jean-Marie Matten was his deputy (suppléant).

The centre-right Radical Party and the centrist Republican, Ecologist and Social Alliance jointly chose Joel Doglioni, a resident of Bogotá, as their candidate. Doglioni was an adviser to France's foreign trade. Jean-Jacques Gaudiot was his deputy (suppléant).

The centre-left Radical Party of the Left chose Thérèse Marianne-Pépin. Catherine Prost was her deputy (suppléante).

Solidarity and Progress, the French branch of the LaRouche movement, was represented by Cédric Manscour, with Silvia Santorio as his deputy (suppléante).

Françoise Lindemann, affiliated to the Union for a Popular Movement, ran as an independent candidate against the party's candidate. A resident of Brazil, she owned and ran a hotel outside Rio de Janeiro. Her deputy (suppléant) was Francis Javelly.

Charles-Henry Chenut, head of a law firm in Brazil, presented himself as an independent centrist candidate. His deputy was Emmanuel Henriet.

Palmira Pozo was an independent candidate. She proposed to allow her constituents to dictate her vote on every bill in Parliament. Francis Le Suave was her deputy.

Jean-Marc Millet was an independent candidate, representing his France Expat Collective Vision (Collectif Vision France Expat) movement. Philippe Gillier was his deputy.

Alain Terrien was an independent candidate, with Bertrang Lalague as his deputy.

==== Results ====
Turnout for the first round was low throughout the constituency, with a low point of 7% in Saint Lucia (where 34 of the 488 registered French citizens voted) and a high point of just 39.8% in El Salvador. Turnout was also comparatively high in Cuba (38.1%). Elsewhere, it was below 30%. The smallest turnout in numeric terms was in Suriname, where only 17 citizens voted, out of 148 (11.5%).

Sergio Coronado, the candidate of the Greens backed by the Socialist Party, obtained a comfortable lead in the first round. He finished first in almost every country (except the Dominican Republic, El Salvador, the Bahamas, Jamaica, Panama, Paraguay and Venezuela), and obtained 13 of the 17 votes cast in Suriname (76.47%). The electorate on the mainstream right was split between the UMP-endorsed candidate, Pascal Drouhaud, and dissident candidate Françoise Lindemann, who succeeded in obtaining over 16% of the vote to finish third. Raquel Garrido, the Left Front's international spokeswoman, obtained her party's joint best result abroad (fourth with 8.6%), matched by Juliette Estivil in the fifth constituency. Coronado went on to win the second round.

Legislative Election 2012: Overseas residents 2 – 2nd round
Party	Candidate	Votes	%	±%
EELV	Sergio Coronado	5,977	53.63	–
UMP	Pascal Drouhaud	5,168	46.37	–
Turnout		11,390	15.55	–
EELV win (new seat)				

Legislative Election 2012: Overseas residents 2 – 1st round
Party	Candidate	Votes	%	±%
EELV	Sergio Coronado	4 128	35.88	–
UMP	Pascal Drouhaud	2 620	22.77	–
DVD	Françoise Lindemann	1 851	16.09	–
FG	Raquel Garrido	990	8.60	–
Independent	Charles-Henry Chenut	466	4.05	–
FN	Alain-Gérard Georgi-Samaran	430	3.74	–
Radical	Joel Doglioni	423	3.68	–
Independent	Jean-Marc Millet	416	3.62	–
PRG	Thérèse Marianne-Pépin	119	1.03	–
SP	Cédric Manscour	41	0.36	–
Independent	Palmira Pozo	13	0.11	–
Independent	Alain Terrien	8	0.07	–
Turnout		11 680	15.9	–

== Presidential elections ==
=== 2017 ===
Summary of the French presidential election results in the 2nd overseas constituency
Candidate	Party		1st round		2nd round	
Candidate	Party		Votes	%	Votes	%
Emmanuel Macron	En Marche!	EM	9,155	37.97%	22,361	89.30%
François Fillon	The Republicans	LR	6,335	26.28%		
Jean-Luc Mélenchon	La France insoumise	FI	4,673	19.38%		
Marine Le Pen	National Front	FN	1,680	6.97%	2,679	10.70%
Benoît Hamon	Socialist Party	PS	1,442	5.98%		
François Asselineau	Popular Republican Union	UPR	244	1.01%		
Nicolas Dupont-Aignan	Debout la France	DLF	216	0.90%		
Philippe Poutou	New Anticapitalist Party	NPA	152	0.63%		
Jean Lassalle	Résistons!		114	0.47%		
Nathalie Arthaud	Lutte Ouvrière	LO	51	0.21%		
Jacques Cheminade	Solidarity and Progress	S&P	47	0.19%		
Total			24,109	100%	25,040	100%
