= Opinion polling for the 2017 French presidential election by region =

This page lists public opinion polls conducted for the 2017 French presidential election, which was held on 23 April 2017 with a run-off on 7 May 2017, within individual regions.

Unless otherwise noted, all polls listed below are compliant with the regulations of the national polling commission (Commission nationale des sondages) and utilize the quota method.

== First round ==
=== By region ===
Auvergne-Rhône-Alpes

Polling firm	Fieldwork date	Sample size	Abs.	Arthaud LO	Poutou NPA	Mélenchon FI	Jadot EELV	Hamon PS	Macron EM	Bayrou MoDem	Lassalle Résistons!	Fillon LR	Dupont-Aignan DLF	Asselineau UPR	Le Pen FN	Cheminade S&P
2017 election	23 Apr 2017	–	20.66%	0.59%	1.04%	19.24%	–	6.13%	24.50%	–	1.27%	20.20%	5.16%	0.99%	20.72%	0.18%
Ipsos	16–18 Apr 2017	1,154	–	0.5%	1.5%	18.5%	–	8.5%	24%	–	1%	18.5%	4%	0.5%	23%	<0.5%
Ipsos	14–17 Mar 2017	1,180	–	1%	1%	10%	–	12.5%	26.5%	–	–	18%	3%	0.5%	27%	0.5%
Ipsos	7–12 Feb 2017	1,327	–	0.5%	0.5%	11%	2%	14%	23%	–	–	20%	3%	–	26%	<0.5%
Ipsos	7–12 Feb 2017	1,327	–	0.5%	0.5%	10%	2%	14%	19.5%	6%	–	19.5%	3%	–	25%	<0.5%

Bourgogne-Franche-Comté

Polling firm	Fieldwork date	Sample size	Abs.	Arthaud LO	Poutou NPA	Mélenchon FI	Jadot EELV	Hamon PS	Macron EM	Bayrou MoDem	Lassalle Résistons!	Fillon LR	Dupont-Aignan DLF	Asselineau UPR	Le Pen FN	Cheminade S&P
2017 election	23 Apr 2017	–	20.63%	0.74%	1.20%	17.93%	–	5.66%	21.89%	–	1.03%	19.70%	5.65%	0.93%	25.09%	0.18%
Ipsos	16–18 Apr 2017	421	–	0.5%	1%	18%	–	5.5%	22.5%	–	0.5%	20%	4%	1%	27%	<0.5%
Ipsos	14–17 Mar 2017	423	–	1%	1%	11%	–	11%	24.5%	–	–	17.5%	2.5%	0.5%	31%	<0.5%
Ipsos	7–12 Feb 2017	463	–	0.5%	0.5%	12%	1%	14%	20.5%	–	–	20.5%	2%	–	29%	<0.5%
Ipsos	7–12 Feb 2017	463	–	0.5%	0.5%	12%	1%	13%	17.5%	6%	–	19.5%	2%	–	28%	<0.5%

Brittany

Polling firm	Fieldwork date	Sample size	Abs.	Arthaud LO	Poutou NPA	Mélenchon FI	Jadot EELV	Hamon PS	Macron EM	Bayrou MoDem	Lassalle Résistons!	Fillon LR	Dupont-Aignan DLF	Asselineau UPR	Le Pen FN	Cheminade S&P
2017 election	23 Apr 2017	–	16.51%	0.71%	1.35%	19.28%	–	9.04%	29.05%	–	0.95%	19.04%	4.40%	0.67%	15.33%	0.17%
Ipsos	16–18 Apr 2017	567	–	1.5%	2%	17.5%	–	10.5%	28.5%	–	2%	20%	3%	1%	14%	<0.5%
Ipsos	14–17 Mar 2017	588	–	1.5%	0.5%	11%	–	17.5%	30.5%	–	–	18%	2.5%	0.5%	18%	<0.5%
Ipsos	7–12 Feb 2017	650	–	1%	1%	9%	2%	21%	27.5%	–	–	20.5%	2%	–	16%	<0.5%
Ipsos	7–12 Feb 2017	650	–	1%	1%	8.5%	2%	19.5%	24%	7.5%	–	19.5%	2%	–	15%	<0.5%

Centre-Val de Loire

Polling firm	Fieldwork date	Sample size	Abs.	Arthaud LO	Poutou NPA	Mélenchon FI	Jadot EELV	Hamon PS	Macron EM	Bayrou MoDem	Lassalle Résistons!	Fillon LR	Dupont-Aignan DLF	Asselineau UPR	Le Pen FN	Cheminade S&P
2017 election	23 Apr 2017	–	19.71%	0.80%	1.14%	17.67%	–	5.85%	22.68%	–	0.95%	21.04%	5.75%	0.85%	23.08%	0.20%
Ipsos	16–18 Apr 2017	451	–	1%	2%	17.5%	–	9.5%	26.5%	–	0.5%	18%	2%	1%	22%	<0.5%
Ipsos	14–17 Mar 2017	476	–	1%	0.5%	11%	–	12%	27.5%	–	–	17%	3%	0.5%	27.5%	<0.5%
Ipsos	7–12 Feb 2017	508	–	0.5%	0.5%	12%	2.5%	14%	22.5%	–	–	18%	3%	–	27%	<0.5%
Ipsos	7–12 Feb 2017	508	–	0.5%	0.5%	11.5%	2%	13.5%	19%	7.5%	–	17%	2%	–	26.5%	<0.5%

Grand Est

Polling firm	Fieldwork date	Sample size	Abs.	Arthaud LO	Poutou NPA	Mélenchon FI	Jadot EELV	Hamon PS	Macron EM	Bayrou MoDem	Lassalle Résistons!	Fillon LR	Dupont-Aignan DLF	Asselineau UPR	Le Pen FN	Cheminade S&P
2017 election	23 Apr 2017	–	21.33%	0.82%	1.16%	16.31%	–	5.09%	20.72%	–	1.03%	19.73%	6.13%	1.02%	27.78%	0.20%
Ipsos	16–18 Apr 2017	914	–	1.5%	1.5%	16%	–	5.5%	21.5%	–	0.5%	19.5%	5.5%	1%	27.5%	<0.5%
Ipsos	14–17 Mar 2017	976	–	1%	0.5%	10%	–	8%	26.5%	–	–	17%	3.5%	0.5%	33%	<0.5%
Ipsos	7–12 Feb 2017	1,044	–	1%	0.5%	11%	1.5%	10%	23.5%	–	–	17%	2.5%	–	33%	<0.5%
Ipsos	7–12 Feb 2017	1,044	–	1%	0.5%	10.5%	1.5%	9.5%	20%	6.5%	–	16.5%	2%	–	32%	<0.5%

Hauts-de-France

Polling firm	Fieldwork date	Sample size	Abs.	Arthaud LO	Poutou NPA	Mélenchon FI	Jadot EELV	Hamon PS	Macron EM	Bayrou MoDem	Lassalle Résistons!	Fillon LR	Dupont-Aignan DLF	Asselineau UPR	Le Pen FN	Cheminade S&P
2017 election	23 Apr 2017	–	21.80%	0.90%	1.04%	19.59%	–	5.15%	19.50%	–	0.69%	16.13%	4.97%	0.81%	31.03%	0.18%
Ipsos	16–18 Apr 2017	986	–	0.5%	2%	19%	–	6.5%	21%	–	0.5%	16.5%	3.5%	0.5%	30%	<0.5%
Ipsos	14–17 Mar 2017	1,019	–	1%	1%	11%	–	11%	24%	–	–	14.5%	2%	0.5%	35%	<0.5%
Ipsos	7–12 Feb 2017	1,141	–	0.5%	1%	12%	1%	12%	22%	–	–	14.5%	2%	–	35%	<0.5%
Ipsos	7–12 Feb 2017	1,141	–	0.5%	1%	11.5%	1%	11.5%	19.5%	5%	–	14%	2%	–	34%	<0.5%

Île-de-France

Polling firm	Fieldwork date	Sample size	Abs.	Arthaud LO	Poutou NPA	Mélenchon FI	Jadot EELV	Hamon PS	Macron EM	Bayrou MoDem	Lassalle Résistons!	Fillon LR	Dupont-Aignan DLF	Asselineau UPR	Le Pen FN	Cheminade S&P
2017 election	23 Apr 2017	–	20.11%	0.42%	0.81%	21.75%	–	7.64%	28.63%	–	0.65%	22.19%	4.02%	1.14%	12.57%	0.17%
Ipsos	16–18 Apr 2017	1,689	–	0.5%	1%	19%	–	8%	23%	–	1%	23.5%	5.5%	1%	17.5%	<0.5%
Ipsos	14–17 Mar 2017	1,621	–	0.5%	0.5%	14%	–	14.5%	27%	–	–	18.5%	4.5%	0.5%	20%	<0.5%
Ipsos	7–12 Feb 2017	1,790	–	0.5%	0.5%	14.5%	2%	16%	24.5%	–	–	19%	4%	–	19%	<0.5%
Ipsos	7–12 Feb 2017	1,790	–	0.5%	0.5%	13.5%	2%	15%	21%	7%	–	18%	4%	–	18.5%	<0.5%

Normandy

Polling firm	Fieldwork date	Sample size	Abs.	Arthaud LO	Poutou NPA	Mélenchon FI	Jadot EELV	Hamon PS	Macron EM	Bayrou MoDem	Lassalle Résistons!	Fillon LR	Dupont-Aignan DLF	Asselineau UPR	Le Pen FN	Cheminade S&P
2017 election	23 Apr 2017	–	19.11%	0.80%	1.26%	19.16%	–	6.01%	22.36%	–	0.73%	19.57%	5.23%	0.76%	23.93%	0.19%
Ipsos	16–18 Apr 2017	504	–	0.5%	1%	22%	–	6.5%	24%	–	1%	19%	2%	0.5%	23%	0.5%
Ipsos	14–17 Mar 2017	545	–	1%	0.5%	11.5%	–	12%	26%	–	–	17.5%	3%	0.5%	28%	<0.5%
Ipsos	7–12 Feb 2017	576	–	0.5%	0.5%	13.5%	1%	14%	22%	–	–	19%	3.5%	–	26%	<0.5%
Ipsos	7–12 Feb 2017	576	–	0.5%	0.5%	13%	1%	12.5%	19%	7%	–	17.5%	3%	–	26%	<0.5%

Nouvelle-Aquitaine

Polling firm	Fieldwork date	Sample size	Abs.	Arthaud LO	Poutou NPA	Mélenchon FI	Jadot EELV	Hamon PS	Macron EM	Bayrou MoDem	Lassalle Résistons!	Fillon LR	Dupont-Aignan DLF	Asselineau UPR	Le Pen FN	Cheminade S&P
2017 election	23 Apr 2017	–	19.53%	0.63%	1.46%	20.75%	–	7.09%	25.12%	–	2.71%	17.79%	4.59%	0.79%	18.89%	0.18%
Ipsos	16–18 Apr 2017	846	–	1%	1.5%	21.5%	–	8.5%	20.5%	–	3%	19.5%	3.5%	0.5%	20.5%	<0.5%
Ipsos	14–17 Mar 2017	853	–	1%	0.5%	13.5%	–	13.5%	26.5%	–	–	18%	3%	0.5%	23%	0.5%
Ipsos	7–12 Feb 2017	938	–	0.5%	1%	13.5%	3%	16.5%	22%	–	–	19.5%	2%	–	22%	<0.5%
Ipsos	7–12 Feb 2017	938	–	0.5%	1%	13.5%	2.5%	16.5%	19%	6%	–	18.5%	1.5%	–	21%	<0.5%

Occitanie

Polling firm	Fieldwork date	Sample size	Abs.	Arthaud LO	Poutou NPA	Mélenchon FI	Jadot EELV	Hamon PS	Macron EM	Bayrou MoDem	Lassalle Résistons!	Fillon LR	Dupont-Aignan DLF	Asselineau UPR	Le Pen FN	Cheminade S&P
2017 election	23 Apr 2017	–	18.96%	0.51%	1.06%	22.14%	–	6.53%	22.32%	–	2.28%	17.07%	4.08%	0.86%	22.98%	0.17%
Ipsos	16–18 Apr 2017	891	–	1%	1.5%	17.5%	–	9.5%	22.5%	–	1%	16%	5%	1%	25%	<0.5%
Ipsos	14–17 Mar 2017	928	–	1%	0.5%	11.5%	–	13.5%	24%	–	–	15%	4.5%	1%	29%	<0.5%
Ipsos	7–12 Feb 2017	1,008	–	0.5%	1%	13%	1%	15.5%	22%	–	–	15.5%	3.5%	–	28%	<0.5%
Ipsos	7–12 Feb 2017	1,008	–	0.5%	1%	12.5%	1%	14.5%	20.5%	5%	–	14.5%	3.5%	–	27%	<0.5%

Pays de la Loire

Polling firm	Fieldwork date	Sample size	Abs.	Arthaud LO	Poutou NPA	Mélenchon FI	Jadot EELV	Hamon PS	Macron EM	Bayrou MoDem	Lassalle Résistons!	Fillon LR	Dupont-Aignan DLF	Asselineau UPR	Le Pen FN	Cheminade S&P
2017 election	23 Apr 2017	–	16.73%	0.73%	1.20%	18.41%	–	6.55%	26.27%	–	0.78%	23.56%	5.01%	0.71%	16.62%	0.17%
Ipsos	16–18 Apr 2017	684	–	1.5%	2%	18%	–	8%	26%	–	<0.5%	22%	5.5%	1%	16%	<0.5%
Ipsos	14–17 Mar 2017	703	–	1.5%	0.5%	10%	–	12.5%	30%	–	–	20%	2.5%	1%	22%	<0.5%
Ipsos	7–12 Feb 2017	759	–	0.5%	0.5%	9%	2.5%	15.5%	25%	–	–	23%	3%	–	21%	<0.5%
Ipsos	7–12 Feb 2017	759	–	0.5%	0.5%	8.5%	2.5%	14.5%	22.5%	6.5%	–	22%	2.5%	–	20%	<0.5%

Provence-Alpes-Côte d'Azur

Polling firm	Fieldwork date	Sample size	Abs.	Arthaud LO	Poutou NPA	Mélenchon FI	Jadot EELV	Hamon PS	Macron EM	Bayrou MoDem	Lassalle Résistons!	Fillon LR	Dupont-Aignan DLF	Asselineau UPR	Le Pen FN	Cheminade S&P
2017 election	23 Apr 2017	–	21.22%	0.38%	0.77%	18.74%	–	4.12%	18.94%	–	1.07%	22.37%	4.33%	0.94%	28.17%	0.17%
Ipsos	16–18 Apr 2017	723	–	0.5%	1%	18.5%	–	5.5%	16%	–	0.5%	20.5%	5%	0.5%	31.5%	0.5%
Ipsos	14–17 Mar 2017	755	–	0.5%	0.5%	11%	–	9%	20%	–	–	19%	3.5%	0.5%	35.5%	0.5%
Ipsos	7–12 Feb 2017	816	–	0.5%	0.5%	10.5%	1%	11%	19.5%	–	–	18%	3%	–	36%	<0.5%
Ipsos	7–12 Feb 2017	816	–	0.5%	0.5%	10%	1%	10.5%	17%	4%	–	17.5%	3%	–	36%	<0.5%

=== By constituency ===
French residents overseas

Polling firm	Fieldwork date	Sample size	Abs.	Arthaud LO	Poutou NPA	Mélenchon FI	Hamon PS	Macron EM	Lassalle Résistons!	Fillon LR	Dupont-Aignan DLF	Asselineau UPR	Le Pen FN	Cheminade S&P
2017 election	23 Apr 2017	–	55.72%	0.24%	0.62%	15.83%	6.87%	40.40%	0.46%	26.32%	1.59%	1.01%	6.48%	0.19%
BVA	3–11 Mar 2017	2,213	–	0.5%	0.5%	8%	13%	36%	–	31%	2%	–	9%	–

French residents overseas' 1st

Polling firm	Fieldwork date	Sample size	Abs.	Arthaud LO	Poutou NPA	Mélenchon FI	Hamon PS	Macron EM	Lassalle Résistons!	Fillon LR	Dupont-Aignan DLF	Asselineau UPR	Le Pen FN	Cheminade S&P
2017 election	23 Apr 2017	–	59.66%	0.18%	0.46%	17.08%	7.09%	45.17%	0.35%	21.25%	1.41%	0.86%	5.99%	0.15%
BVA	3–11 Mar 2017	281	–	<0.5%	2%	4%	10%	34.5%	–	36.5%	1%	–	12%	–

French residents overseas' 5th

Polling firm	Fieldwork date	Sample size	Abs.	Arthaud LO	Poutou NPA	Mélenchon FI	Hamon PS	Macron EM	Lassalle Résistons!	Fillon LR	Dupont-Aignan DLF	Asselineau UPR	Le Pen FN	Cheminade S&P
2017 election	23 Apr 2017	–	61.49%	0.29%	0.77%	17.83%	6.95%	35.01%	0.49%	26.02%	1.93%	0.73%	9.79%	0.17%
BVA	3–11 Mar 2017	283	–	1.5%	<0.5%	7.5%	15.5%	33.5%	–	29%	2.5%	–	10.5%	–

French residents overseas' 11th

Polling firm	Fieldwork date	Sample size	Abs.	Arthaud LO	Poutou NPA	Mélenchon FI	Hamon PS	Macron EM	Lassalle Résistons!	Fillon LR	Dupont-Aignan DLF	Asselineau UPR	Le Pen FN	Cheminade S&P
2017 election	23 Apr 2017	–	45.33%	0.19%	0.40%	13.74%	5.98%	39.20%	0.58%	29.64%	1.42%	1.89%	6.80%	0.15%
BVA	3–11 Mar 2017	380	–	0.5%	<0.5%	7%	8%	33.5%	–	32%	3%	–	16%	–

== Second round ==
=== Macron–Le Pen ===
==== By region ====
Auvergne-Rhône-Alpes

Polling firm	Fieldwork date	Sample size	Abs.	Macron EM	Le Pen FN
2017 election	7 May 2017	–	23.51%	67.13%	32.87%
Ipsos	30 Apr–2 May 2017	1,156	–	60%	40%
Ipsos	16–18 Apr 2017	1,154	–	61%	39%
Ipsos	14–17 Mar 2017	1,180	–	59%	41%

Bourgogne-Franche-Comté

Polling firm	Fieldwork date	Sample size	Abs.	Macron EM	Le Pen FN
2017 election	7 May 2017	–	22.65%	60.48%	39.52%
Ipsos	30 Apr–2 May 2017	429	–	54.5%	45.5%
Ipsos	16–18 Apr 2017	421	–	56%	44%
Ipsos	14–17 Mar 2017	423	–	56%	44%

Brittany

Polling firm	Fieldwork date	Sample size	Abs.	Macron EM	Le Pen FN
2017 election	7 May 2017	–	20.31%	75.36%	24.64%
Ipsos	30 Apr–2 May 2017	566	–	69%	31%
Ipsos	16–18 Apr 2017	567	–	70%	30%
Ipsos	14–17 Mar 2017	588	–	72%	28%

Centre-Val de Loire

Polling firm	Fieldwork date	Sample size	Abs.	Macron EM	Le Pen FN
2017 election	7 May 2017	–	23.30%	63.32%	36.68%
Ipsos	30 Apr–2 May 2017	449	–	57%	43%
Ipsos	16–18 Apr 2017	451	–	65%	35%
Ipsos	14–17 Mar 2017	476	–	64%	36%

Grand Est

Polling firm	Fieldwork date	Sample size	Abs.	Macron EM	Le Pen FN
2017 election	7 May 2017	–	24.69%	57.94%	42.06%
Ipsos	30 Apr–2 May 2017	944	–	52.5%	47.5%
Ipsos	16–18 Apr 2017	914	–	55%	45%
Ipsos	14–17 Mar 2017	976	–	56%	44%

Hauts-de-France

Polling firm	Fieldwork date	Sample size	Abs.	Macron EM	Le Pen FN
2017 election	7 May 2017	–	25.00%	52.94%	47.06%
Ipsos	30 Apr–2 May 2017	1,034	–	52.5%	47.5%
Ipsos	16–18 Apr 2017	986	–	56%	44%
Ipsos	14–17 Mar 2017	1,019	–	55%	45%

Île-de-France

Polling firm	Fieldwork date	Sample size	Abs.	Macron EM	Le Pen FN
2017 election	7 May 2017	–	25.30%	78.73%	21.27%
Ipsos	30 Apr–2 May 2017	1,602	–	69%	31%
Ipsos	16–18 Apr 2017	1,689	–	68%	32%
Ipsos	14–17 Mar 2017	1,621	–	68%	32%

Normandy

Polling firm	Fieldwork date	Sample size	Abs.	Macron EM	Le Pen FN
2017 election	7 May 2017	–	22.81%	61.96%	38.04%
Ipsos	30 Apr–2 May 2017	511	–	56.5%	43.5%
Ipsos	16–18 Apr 2017	504	–	63%	37%
Ipsos	14–17 Mar 2017	545	–	62%	38%

Nouvelle-Aquitaine

Polling firm	Fieldwork date	Sample size	Abs.	Macron EM	Le Pen FN
2017 election	7 May 2017	–	22.15%	68.65%	31.35%
Ipsos	30 Apr–2 May 2017	827	–	63%	37%
Ipsos	16–18 Apr 2017	846	–	61%	39%
Ipsos	14–17 Mar 2017	853	–	63%	37%

Occitanie

Polling firm	Fieldwork date	Sample size	Abs.	Macron EM	Le Pen FN
2017 election	7 May 2017	–	23.30%	62.99%	37.01%
Ipsos	30 Apr–2 May 2017	856	–	56.5%	43.5%
Ipsos	16–18 Apr 2017	891	–	55%	45%
Ipsos	14–17 Mar 2017	928	–	56%	44%

Pays de la Loire

Polling firm	Fieldwork date	Sample size	Abs.	Macron EM	Le Pen FN
2017 election	7 May 2017	–	21.45%	72.42%	27.58%
Ipsos	30 Apr–2 May 2017	692	–	64%	36%
Ipsos	16–18 Apr 2017	684	–	68%	32%
Ipsos	14–17 Mar 2017	703	–	67%	33%

Provence-Alpes-Côte d'Azur

Polling firm	Fieldwork date	Sample size	Abs.	Macron EM	Le Pen FN
2017 election	7 May 2017	–	25.61%	55.47%	44.53%
Ipsos	30 Apr–2 May 2017	708	–	49.5%	50.5%
Ipsos	16–18 Apr 2017	723	–	49%	51%
Ipsos	14–17 Mar 2017	755	–	51%	49%

=== Fillon–Le Pen ===
==== By region ====
Polling firm	Fieldwork date	Sample size	Region	Fillon LR	Le Pen FN
Ipsos	16–18 Apr 2017	1,154	Auvergne-Rhône-Alpes	54%	46%
Ipsos	16–18 Apr 2017	421	Bourgogne-Franche-Comté	51%	49%
Ipsos	16–18 Apr 2017	567	Brittany	66%	34%
Ipsos	16–18 Apr 2017	451	Centre-Val de Loire	55%	45%
Ipsos	16–18 Apr 2017	914	Grand Est	52%	48%
Ipsos	16–18 Apr 2017	986	Hauts-de-France	46%	54%
Ipsos	16–18 Apr 2017	1,689	Île-de-France	64%	36%
Ipsos	16–18 Apr 2017	504	Normandy	57%	43%
Ipsos	16–18 Apr 2017	846	Nouvelle-Aquitaine	57%	43%
Ipsos	16–18 Apr 2017	891	Occitanie	47%	53%
Ipsos	16–18 Apr 2017	684	Pays de la Loire	64%	36%
Ipsos	16–18 Apr 2017	723	Provence-Alpes-Côte d'Azur	47%	53%

=== Macron–Fillon ===
==== By region ====
Polling firm	Fieldwork date	Sample size	Region	Macron EM	Fillon LR
Ipsos	16–18 Apr 2017	1,154	Auvergne-Rhône-Alpes	64%	36%
Ipsos	16–18 Apr 2017	421	Bourgogne-Franche-Comté	59%	41%
Ipsos	16–18 Apr 2017	567	Brittany	68%	32%
Ipsos	16–18 Apr 2017	451	Centre-Val de Loire	67%	33%
Ipsos	16–18 Apr 2017	914	Grand Est	62%	38%
Ipsos	16–18 Apr 2017	986	Hauts-de-France	68%	32%
Ipsos	16–18 Apr 2017	1,689	Île-de-France	64%	36%
Ipsos	16–18 Apr 2017	504	Normandy	67%	33%
Ipsos	16–18 Apr 2017	846	Nouvelle-Aquitaine	62%	38%
Ipsos	16–18 Apr 2017	891	Occitanie	66%	34%
Ipsos	16–18 Apr 2017	684	Pays de la Loire	64%	36%
Ipsos	16–18 Apr 2017	723	Provence-Alpes-Côte d'Azur	55%	45%

=== Mélenchon–Macron ===
==== By region ====
Polling firm	Fieldwork date	Sample size	Region	Mélenchon FI	Macron EM
Ipsos	16–18 Apr 2017	1,154	Auvergne-Rhône-Alpes	40%	60%
Ipsos	16–18 Apr 2017	421	Bourgogne-Franche-Comté	42%	58%
Ipsos	16–18 Apr 2017	567	Brittany	42%	58%
Ipsos	16–18 Apr 2017	451	Centre-Val de Loire	42%	58%
Ipsos	16–18 Apr 2017	914	Grand Est	44%	56%
Ipsos	16–18 Apr 2017	986	Hauts-de-France	44%	56%
Ipsos	16–18 Apr 2017	1,689	Île-de-France	40%	60%
Ipsos	16–18 Apr 2017	504	Normandy	47%	53%
Ipsos	16–18 Apr 2017	846	Nouvelle-Aquitaine	44%	56%
Ipsos	16–18 Apr 2017	891	Occitanie	43%	57%
Ipsos	16–18 Apr 2017	684	Pays de la Loire	37%	63%
Ipsos	16–18 Apr 2017	723	Provence-Alpes-Côte d'Azur	46%	54%

=== Mélenchon–Fillon ===
==== By region ====
Polling firm	Fieldwork date	Sample size	Region	Mélenchon FI	Fillon LR
Ipsos	16–18 Apr 2017	1,154	Auvergne-Rhône-Alpes	56%	44%
Ipsos	16–18 Apr 2017	421	Bourgogne-Franche-Comté	54%	46%
Ipsos	16–18 Apr 2017	567	Brittany	59%	41%
Ipsos	16–18 Apr 2017	451	Centre-Val de Loire	58%	42%
Ipsos	16–18 Apr 2017	914	Grand Est	56%	44%
Ipsos	16–18 Apr 2017	986	Hauts-de-France	63%	37%
Ipsos	16–18 Apr 2017	1,689	Île-de-France	57%	43%
Ipsos	16–18 Apr 2017	504	Normandy	60%	40%
Ipsos	16–18 Apr 2017	846	Nouvelle-Aquitaine	58%	42%
Ipsos	16–18 Apr 2017	891	Occitanie	63%	37%
Ipsos	16–18 Apr 2017	684	Pays de la Loire	53%	47%
Ipsos	16–18 Apr 2017	723	Provence-Alpes-Côte d'Azur	51%	49%

=== Mélenchon–Le Pen ===
==== By region ====
Polling firm	Fieldwork date	Sample size	Region	Mélenchon FI	Le Pen FN
Ipsos	16–18 Apr 2017	1,154	Auvergne-Rhône-Alpes	56%	44%
Ipsos	16–18 Apr 2017	421	Bourgogne-Franche-Comté	51%	49%
Ipsos	16–18 Apr 2017	567	Brittany	69%	31%
Ipsos	16–18 Apr 2017	451	Centre-Val de Loire	60%	40%
Ipsos	16–18 Apr 2017	914	Grand Est	49%	51%
Ipsos	16–18 Apr 2017	986	Hauts-de-France	54%	46%
Ipsos	16–18 Apr 2017	1,689	Île-de-France	63%	37%
Ipsos	16–18 Apr 2017	504	Normandy	58%	42%
Ipsos	16–18 Apr 2017	846	Nouvelle-Aquitaine	60%	40%
Ipsos	16–18 Apr 2017	891	Occitanie	53%	47%
Ipsos	16–18 Apr 2017	684	Pays de la Loire	61%	39%
Ipsos	16–18 Apr 2017	723	Provence-Alpes-Côte d'Azur	45%	55%
