= 2024 French legislative election in Aude =

Following the first round of the 2024 French legislative election on 30 June 2024, runoff elections in each constituency where no candidate received a vote share greater than 50 percent were scheduled for 7 July. Candidates permitted to stand in the runoff elections needed to either come in first or second place in the first round or achieve more than 12.5 percent of the votes of the entire electorate (as opposed to 12.5 percent of the vote share due to low turnout).

== Aude ==
=== 1st constituency ===
Candidate	Party or alliance		First round		Second round	
Candidate	Party or alliance		Votes	%	Votes	%
Christophe Barthès	National Rally		32,916	49.33	37,049	61.44
Philippe Poutou	New Popular Front	New Anticapitalist Party	12,475	18.70	23,251	38.56
Jean-Claude Perez	Ensemble	Renaissance	11,252	16.86		
Aurélien Turchetto	Miscellaneous left	Independent	8,463	12.68		
Fabrice Coffinet	Reconquête		823	1.23		
Monique Ferré	Miscellaneous centre	Independent	465	0.70		
Nicole Gadrat	Far-left	Lutte Ouvrière	326	0.49		
Jean-Marc Marin	The Republicans		4	0.01		
Monique Ferré	Regionalists	Independent	0	0.00		
Total			66,724	100.00	60,300	100.00
Valid votes			66,724	96.05	60,300	87.84
Invalid votes			1,038	1.49	2,269	3.31
Blank votes			1,706	2.46	6,076	8.85
Total votes			69,468	100.00	68,645	100.00
Registered voters/turnout			99,219	70.01	99,232	69.18

=== 2nd constituency ===
Candidate	Party or alliance		First round		Second round	
Candidate	Party or alliance		Votes	%	Votes	%
Frédéric Falcon	National Rally		29,212	48.12	33,573	58.22
Viviane Thivent	New Popular Front	The Ecologists	15,795	26.02	24,092	41.78
Christine Breyton	Ensemble	Renaissance	11,727	19.32		
Gérard Lenfant	Independent		1,927	3.17		
Alain Peyre	Reconquête		969	1.60		
Alain Brun	Miscellaneous right	Independent	654	1.08		
Annette Vigier	Far-left	Lutte Ouvrière	418	0.69		
Nicole Grau	Regionalists	Independent	0	0.00		
Total			60,702	100.00	57,665	100.00
Valid votes			60,702	96.47	57,665	91.37
Invalid votes			911	1.45	1,492	2.36
Blank votes			1,311	2.08	3,952	6.26
Total votes			62,924	100.00	63,109	100.00
Registered voters/turnout			92,832	67.78	92,846	67.97

=== 3rd constituency ===
Candidate	Party or alliance		First round		Second round	
Candidate	Party or alliance		Votes	%	Votes	%
Julien Rancoule	National Rally		27,946	44.70	31,514	52.07
Philippe Andrieu	New Popular Front	Socialist Party	20,426	32.67	29,004	47.93
Sylvie Sorel-Lestin	Ensemble	Renaissance	8,155	13.04		
Jean-François Leclerc	The Republicans		2,096	3.35		
Christine Champion	Ecologists	Union of Democrats and Independents (Note: Dissident not endorsed by Ensemble)	1,868	2.99		
Bernard Bianco	Résistons !		759	1.21		
Nathalie Marteel	Reconquête		681	1.09		
Dominique Galonnier	Far-left	Lutte Ouvrière	585	0.94		
Total			62,516	100.00	60,518	100.00
Valid votes			62,516	96.53	60,518	92.84
Invalid votes			927	1.43	1,419	2.18
Blank votes			1,322	2.04	3,245	4.98
Total votes			64,765	100.00	65,182	100.00
Registered voters/turnout			89,858	72.07	89,852	72.54
