= Danièle Hérin =

French politician

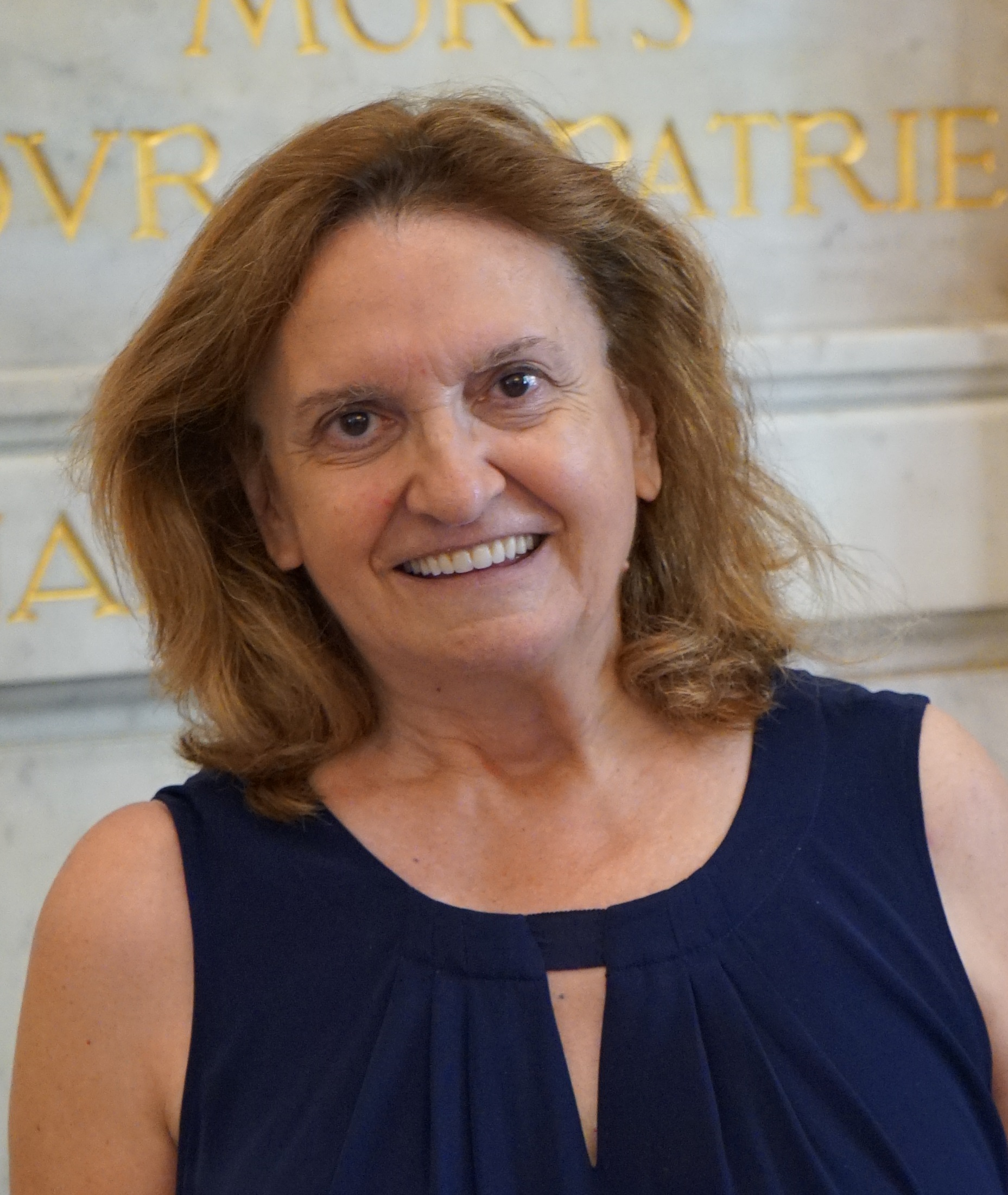

Member of the National Assembly for Aude's 1st constituency
- In office 21 June 2017 – June 2022
- Preceded by: Jean-Claude Perez
- Succeeded by: Christophe Barthès

Personal details
- Born: 14 January 1947 (age 79) Carcassonne, France
- Party: Renaissance

Danièle Hérin (born 14 January 1947) is a French computer scientist and politician of Renaissance (RE) who was elected to the French National Assembly on 18 June 2017, representing Aude's 1st constituency.

== Political career ==
After entering parliament, Hérin was one of the four deputy chairpersons of the LREM parliamentary group under the leadership of successive chairmen Richard Ferrand (2017-2018) and Gilles Le Gendre (since 2018). She also serves as member of the Committee on Cultural Affairs and Education. In addition to her committee assignments, she is part of the French-Estonian Parliamentary Friendship Group.

She lost her seat in the first round of the 2022 French legislative election.

== Political positions ==
In July 2019, Hérin voted in favor of the French ratification of the European Union’s Comprehensive Economic and Trade Agreement (CETA) with Canada.
