= Aude's 1st constituency =

Constituency of the National Assembly of France

1st constituency of Aude
- inline Constituency of the National Assembly of France

- The three constituencies of Aude

- Aude in France
- Deputy: Christophe Barthès; RN
- Department: Aude
- Cantons: Capendu, Carcassonne-1, Carcassonne-2-Nord, Carcassonne-3, Conques-sur-Orbiel, Durban-Corbières, Ginestas, Lézignan-Corbières, Mas-Cabardès, Peyriac-Minervois
- Registered voters: 100,908

The 1st constituency of Aude is a French legislative constituency in the Aude département.

== Deputies ==
Election	Member	Party
1988	Joseph Vidal	PS
1993	Gérard Larrat	UDF
1997	Jean-Claude Perez	PS
2002	Jean-Claude Perez	PS
2007	Jean-Claude Perez	PS
2012	Jean-Claude Perez	PS
2017	Danièle Hérin	LREM
2022	Christophe Barthès	RN
2024	Christophe Barthès	RN

== Election results ==
=== 2024 ===
Candidate	Party	Alliance	First round			Second round		
Candidate	Party	Alliance	Votes	%	+/–	Votes	%	+/–
Christophe Barthes	RN		32,916	49.33	+16.53	37,049	61.44	+7.88
Philippe Poutou	NPA	NFP	12,475	18.70	-9.45	23,251	38.56	-7.88
Jean-Claude Perez	RE	Ensemble	11,252	16.86	-5.12			
Aurélien Turchetto	DVG		8,463	12.68	new			
Fabrice Coffinet	REC		823	1.23	-3.51			
Laure-Nelly Amalric	ECO		465	0.70	-2.29			
Nicole Gadrat	LO		327	0.49	-1.03			
Jean-Marc Marin	LR	UDC	4	0.01	-5.16			
Monique Ferré	REG		0	0.00	new			
Votes			66,725	100.00		60,300	100.00	
Valid votes			66,725	96.05	-0.95	60,300	87.84	-1.08
Blank votes			1,755	2.53	+0.42	6,076	8.85	+0.90
Null votes			988	1.42	+0.53	2,269	3.31	+0.18
Turnout			69,468	70.01	+19.36	68,645	69.18	+18.18
Abstentions			29,752	29.99	-19.36	30,587	30.82	-18.18
Registered voters			99,220			99,232		
Result			RN HOLD					

=== 2022 ===
Legislative Election 2022: Aude's 1st constituency
Party	Candidate	Votes	%	±%
RN	Christophe Barthès	15,871	32.80	+9.98
PS (NUPÉS)	Sophie Courriere Calmon	13,620	28.15	+1.09
LREM (Ensemble)	Danièle Hérin	10,636	21.98	−5.51
LR (UDC)	Laurent Perez	2,501	5.17	−5.65
REC	Axel Roulliaux	2,291	4.74	N/A
DVE	Laure-Nelly Amalric	1,445	2.99	N/A
Others	N/A	2,017		
Turnout		48,381	50.65	−2.63
2nd round result
RN	Christophe Barthès	23,914	53.56	+12.27
PS (NUPÉS)	Sophie Courriere Calmon	20,734	46.44	N/A
Turnout		44,648	51.00	+3.59
RN gain from LREM				

=== 2017 ===
Candidate	Label	First round		Second round	
Candidate	Label	Votes	%	Votes	%
Danièle Hérin	REM	13,486	27.49	23,137	58.71
Christophe Barthès	FN	11,199	22.82	16,275	41.29
Marine Toro	FI	6,964	14.19		
Alain Giniès	PS	4,868	9.92		
Miren de Lorgeril	LR	4,712	9.60		
Jean-Claude Perez	DVG	2,541	5.18		
Mylène Vesentini	PCF	1,462	2.98		
Hervé Boissonade	DLF	882	1.80		
Yamina Mamou	UDI	599	1.22		
Nicole Escourbiac	ECO	578	1.18		
Patricia Dandeu	DIV	573	1.17		
Arthur Chevignard	DIV	360	0.73		
Pierre Fabre	DVG	297	0.61		
Marie Sanz	DIV	294	0.60		
Nicole Gadrat	EXG	250	0.51		
Votes		49,065	100.00	39,412	100.00
Valid votes		49,065	96.82	39,412	87.39
Blank votes		1,111	2.19	3,895	8.64
Null votes		501	0.99	1,793	3.98
Turnout		50,677	53.28	45,100	47.41
Abstentions		44,430	46.72	50,034	52.59
Registered voters		95,107		95,134	
Source: Ministry of the Interior

=== 2012 ===
Summary of the 10 June and 17 June 2012 French legislative in Aude’s 1st Constituency election results
Candidate	Party		1st round		2nd round	
Candidate	Party		Votes	%	Votes	%
Jean-Claude Perez	Socialist Party	PS	23,364	41.37%	32,510	60.97%
Robert Morio	National Front	FN	11,674	20.67%	20,809	39.03%
Monique Boonen	Union for a Popular Movement	UMP	9,961	17.64%		
Rosine Charlut	Left Front	FG	4,452	7.88%		
Gérard Schivardi	Far Left	EXG	2,754	4.88%		
Christine Sthémer	The Greens	VEC	1,790	3.17%		
Isabelle Fillon		CEN	816	1.44%		
André Zuliani	Miscellaneous Right	DVD	584	1.03%		
Jean-François Daraud	New Centre-Presidential Majority	NCE	582	1.03%		
Lucile el Hedri	Far Left	EXG	206	0.36%		
Jean-Marc Jouffroy	Ecologist	ECO	158	0.28%		
Laurent Aslan	Regionalist	REG	132	0.23%		
Marie Dugied-Soriano	Other	AUT	0	0.00%		
Total			56,473	100%	53,319	100%
Registered voters			92,762		92,733	
Blank/Void ballots			1,246	2.16%	3,977	6.94%
Turnout			57,719	62.22%	57,296	61.79%
Abstentions			35,043	37.78%	35,437	38.21%
Result					PS HOLD	

=== 2007 ===
Summary of the 10 June and 17 June 2007 French legislative in Aude’s 1st Constituency election results
Candidate	Party		1st round		2nd round	
Candidate	Party		Votes	%	Votes	%
Jean-Claude Perez	Socialist Party	PS	16,977	37.85%	25,290	54.47%
Isabelle Chesa	Union for a Popular Movement	UMP	16,767	37.38%	21,135	45.53%
Monique Denux	Democratic Movement	MoDem	2,680	5.97%		
Robert Morio	National Front	FN	2,359	5.26%		
Amandine Carrazoni Omari	Communist	COM	1,901	4.24%		
Alain Vielmas	Far Left	EXG	1,101	2.45%		
Claude-Marie Benson	The Greens	VEC	1,046	2.33%		
Claudine Latorre	Hunting, Fishing, Nature, Traditions	CPNT	517	1.15%		
Claudine Gamerre	Ecologist	ECO	314	0.70%		
Jean-Pierre Brun	Far Right	EXD	282	0.63%		
Denis Bord	Divers	DIV	261	0.58%		
Magali Urroz	Regionalist	REG	242	0.54%		
Lucile el Hedri	Far Left	EXG	224	0.50%		
Jacques Vieules	Far Left	EXG	184	0.41%		
Total			44,855	100%	46,425	100%
Registered voters			70,199		70,191	
Blank/Void ballots			993	2.17%	1,784	3.70%
Turnout			45,848	65.31%	48,209	68.68%
Abstentions			24,351	34.69%	21,982	31.32%
Result					PS HOLD	

=== 2002 ===
Legislative Election 2002: Aude's 1st constituency
Party	Candidate	Votes	%	±%
PS	Jean-Claude Perez	16,191	36.12	+1.69
UMP	Gérard Larrat	13,016	29.04	N/A
FN	Robert Morio	6,194	13.82	−1.24
PCF	Henry Garino	3,011	6.72	−7.97
PR	Roger Bertrand	1,487	3.32	N/A
Others	N/A	4,922		
Turnout		46,036	70.07	
2nd round result
PS	Jean-Claude Perez	22,924	55.46	−5.25
UMP	Gérard Larrat	18,414	44.54	N/A
Turnout		44,046	67.07	
PS hold				

=== 1997 ===
Legislative Election 1997: Aude's 1st constituency
Party	Candidate	Votes	%	±%
PS	Jean-Claude Perez	15,447	34.43	
UDF	Gérard Larrat	10,836	24.15	
FN	Henr Escortell	6,757	15.06	
PCF	Henri Garino	6,589	14.69	
MPF	Jean-Marc Pagel	1,161	2.59	
LV	Bernard Gils	1,075	2.40	
Others	N/A	3,002		
Turnout		47,034	72.83	
2nd round result
PS	Jean-Claude Perez	27,975	60.71	
UDF	Gérard Larrat	18,105	39.29	
Turnout		49,233	76.27	
PS gain from UDF				

== Sources ==
- French Interior Ministry results website: "Résultats électoraux officiels en France" (in French).
