= Benoît Larrouquis =

French politician

Member of the National Assembly for second French legislative constituency for citizens abroad
- Incumbent
- Assumed office 13 November 2025
- Preceded by: Éléonore Caroit

Personal details
- Born: 1969 (age 56–57)
- Party: Renaissance

Benoît Larrouquis (born 1969) is a French business leader and politician who has served as Member of Parliament for the second constituency of French citizens living abroad (Latin America and the Caribbean) since November 13, 2025. He sits within the Together for the Republic group (Ensemble pour la République) in the National Assembly. and serves as a member of the Committee on Sustainable Development and Spatial Planning.

== Biography ==
=== Professional career ===
Originally from Haut-Béarn (Pyrénées-Atlantiques), Benoît Larrouquis holds a degree in Automation and Robotics Engineering. After several years working in this field, he founded an international health insurance brokerage company and settled in Latin America, where he has lived for nearly thirty years.

=== Political career ===
He was elected Consular Councillor in Mexico and later became President of the Consular Council. For more than fifteen years, he served on a voluntary basis as a representative of the Caisse des Français de l'Étranger (CFE).

Having served as Éléonore Caroit’s substitute since the 2022 legislative elections, he became a Member of Parliament on November 13, 2025, following her appointment as Minister Delegate for Francophonie, International Partnerships, and French Citizens Abroad.

== See also ==
- List of deputies of the 17th National Assembly of France
