= Sergio Coronado =

French politician

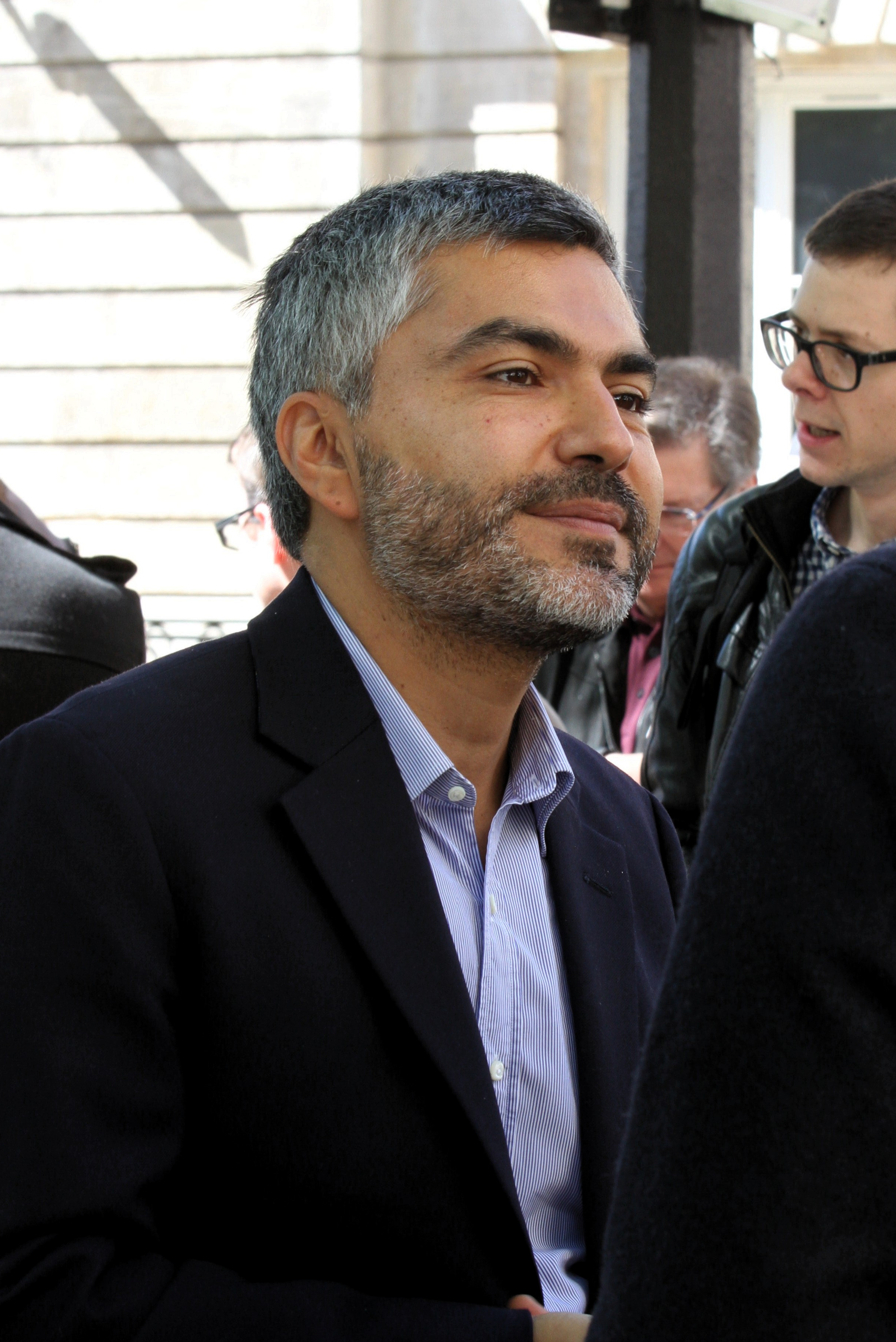

Member of the French National Assembly for French residents overseas
- In office 20 June 2012 – 20 June 2017 (5 years)
- Preceded by: District Created
- Succeeded by: Paula Forteza

Deputy Mayor of the 14th arrondissement of Paris
- In office 19 March 2001 – 8 March 2008 (6 years, 11 months and 18 days)

Personal details
- Born: 13 May 1970 (age 55) Osorno, Chile
- Party: EELV

Sergio Coronado (born 13 May 1970) is a French politician, former member of the French National Assembly representing French residents overseas.

== Biography ==
=== Early life ===
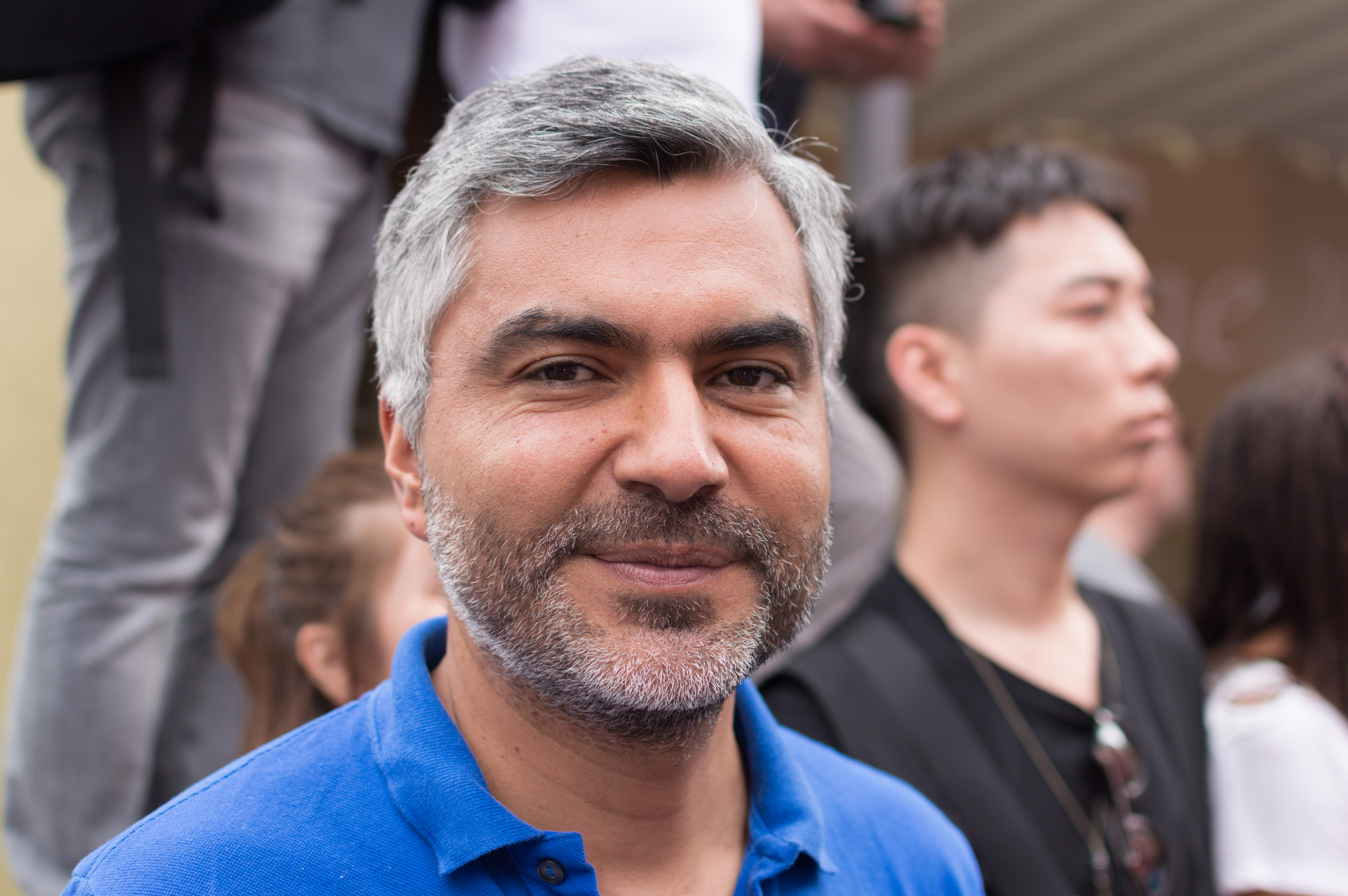
Sergio Coronado in 2017

Sergio Coronado left Chile with his family after the coup d'état of General Pinochet in 1973. He grew up in Argentina, and arrived in France in 1982. At the end of 2008, he won a scholarship in political science, and moved to Bogotá, Colombia. He attends the Universidad Externado de Colombia, and joins the ADFE-Français du Monde association.

On 20 February 2008, he published a biography devoted to Íngrid Betancourt published by Fayard Edition.

In June 2012, on the occasion of the Pride parade, he came out as gay on Twitter. This is the 2nd MP to do it publicly.

=== Political career ===
He joined the Greens in 1998, and joined the Executive College. He was re-elected for three successive terms in 2000, 2002 and 2004 in various capacities. He was notably co-spokesman of the party with Cécile Duflot from January 2005 to January 2008, after almost becoming national secretary at the Reims Federal Assembly in 2004. In 2002, Noël Mamère chose him as director of communication and deputy campaign manager for his presidential campaign.

From March 2001 to March 2008, he was the elected municipal of the 14th arrondissement of Paris on a list of rally of the left and ecologists. As deputy mayor, he was in charge of local democracy, associative life and neighborhood councils.

At the 2011 Europe Ecology – The Greens primary, he was Eva Joly's campaign director. Once invested by the ecologists, she makes it one of its four spokespersons, alongside José Bové, Dominique Voynet and Michèle Rivasi, and its director of communication.

=== Member of the National Assembly ===
As part of an agreement between EELV and the PS, he is a candidate in the 2012 legislative elections for the Second constituency for French residents overseas. On 17 June 2012, he was elected.

On 15 April 2015, he voted against Article 2 of the Intelligence Act. 5 May 2015, he votes against the whole of this same project. After the November 2015 Paris attacks, Sergio Coronado is one of the six French deputies to vote against the extension of the States of emergency in France. On 30 November 2015, he is among the signatories of the Call of the 58: "We will demonstrate during the state of emergency".

Supported by the Europe Ecology – The Greens, La France Insoumise and the Pirate Party, he is a candidate in the 2017 legislative elections for the Second constituency for French residents overseas. On 18 June 2017, he was eliminated in the second round, ahead of Paula Forteza, the REM candidate.

== See also ==
- 2012 French legislative election
- Second constituency for French residents overseas
