= Paula Forteza =

French politician (born 1986)

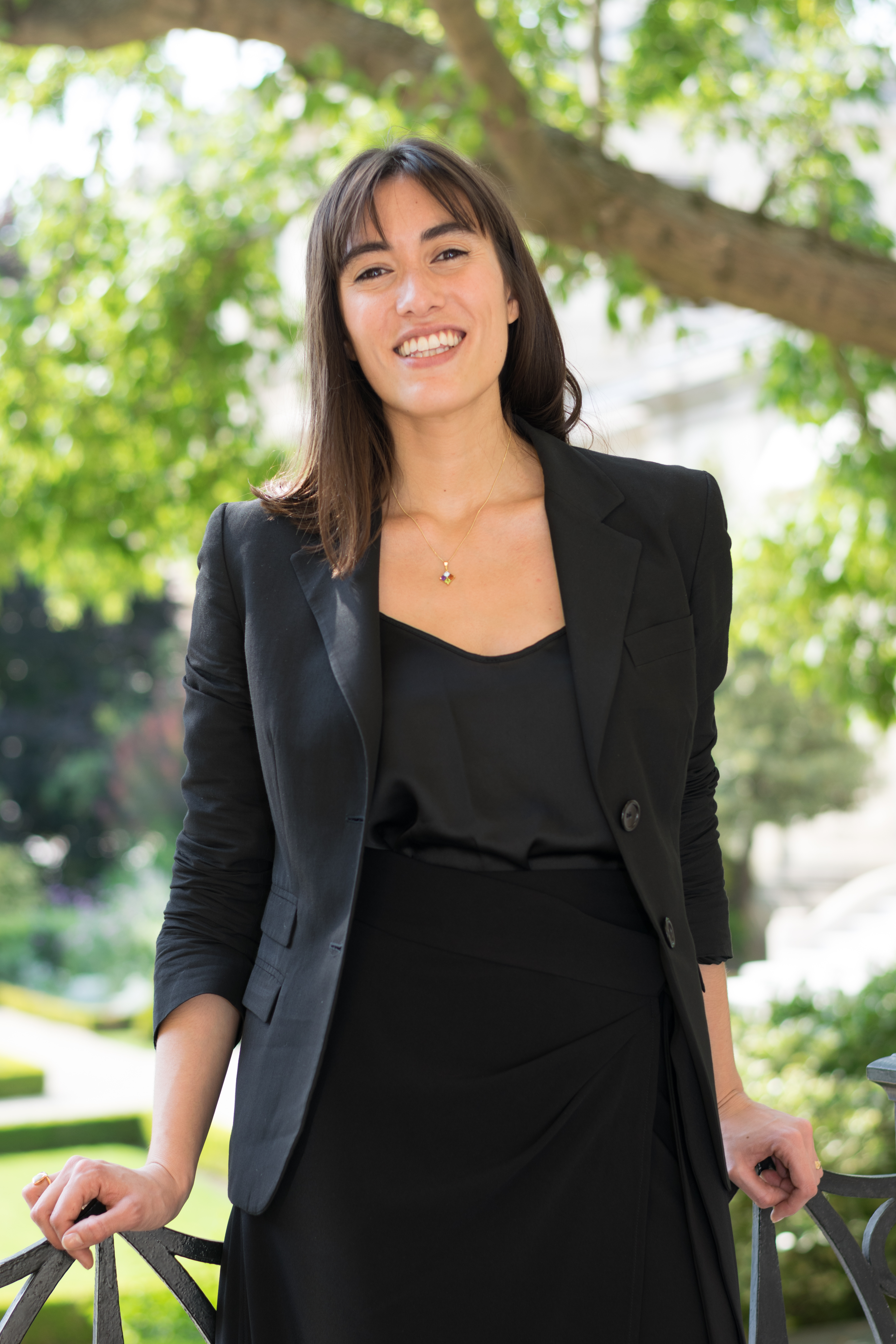

Member of the National Assembly for the Second Overseas Constituency
- In office 21 June 2017 – 21 June 2022
- Preceded by: Sergio Coronado
- Succeeded by: Éléonore Caroit

Personal details
- Born: 8 August 1986 (age 40) Paris, France
- Party: LREM (2017–2020); EDS (2020)
- Education: Torcuato di Tella University Sciences Po
- Website: forteza2017.fr

Paula Forteza (born 8 August 1986) is a French politician who was elected to the National Assembly of France in the 2017 French legislative election as a member of La République En Marche!. She represents the Second constituency for French residents overseas (Latin America and the Caribbean). Head of Cédric Villani list in the 19th arrondissement of Paris for the 2020 French municipal elections, she left LREM during the campaign.

On 16 March 2022, she announced she would not be seeking re-election at the 2022 French legislative election.

== Early life and education ==
Forteza was born in Paris to Argentine parents, where she lived for seven years before moving to Argentina, where she studied at the Lycée Franco-Argentin Jean Mermoz.

Forteza studied political science at Torcuato di Tella University before working on a social protection program for the government of Buenos Aires. In 2014 she returned to France to study at Sciences Po. She graduated with a Master of Public Administration in 2016 and began working for Etalab, a Prime minister service in charge of the open-data and open-government policy.

== Political career ==
Forteza was chosen as a candidate for La République En Marche! in May 2017 for the second constituency for French residents overseas. On 17 June she was elected with 60.92% of the vote, defeating Sergio Coronado of Europe Ecology – The Greens. The abstention rate was 87.53%, compared to 84.45% in the 2012 elections.

In parliament, Forteza serves as member of the Committee on Economical Affairs. In addition to her committee assignments, she is part of the parliamentary friendship groups with Argentina and Brazil.

=== Legislative activity ===
In August 2017, Forteza was given responsibility for all bills aiming to restore trust in political life.

In 2018, she created, with French deputy Matthieu Orphelin, a website allowing citizens to ask questions, some of which later were sent to the French Government.

The same year, she was nominated rapporteur of the Personal Data Protection Bill which integrates into French law the General Data Protection Regulation (GDPR). On this occasion, she publicly denounced the "commercialization of personal data".

During 2019 spring, she was in the running for the position of Minister of State for the Digital Economy, finally vested in Cédric O: according to Le Figaro, she would have been "more centred on revitalizing democracy with digital tools, or protecting personal data".

In October 2019, she was nominated co-rapporteur of a parliamentary mission on "digital identity".

In January 2020, she remitted to the Government a parliamentary report of the French strategy for quantum technologies, containing 37 public recommendations out of 50.

=== Critics and departure from LREM ===
On January 28, 2020, she announced her departure from La République en marche on French national radio: having explained the lack of consideration for left and ecological issues, she expressed deep disagreement with the political methods used by the party, which "rewards friendships more than competencies". She became a non-attached member at the French National Assembly and called for the creation of a new "ecologist and progressist" political group. From May until October 2020, she was one of the 17 initial members of the short-lived Ecology Democracy Solidarity group. Since October 2020, she has sat as a Non-Attached Member.

=== 2020 municipal elections in Paris ===
She supports the dissenting candidacy of Cédric Villani for the 2020 municipal elections in Paris, and campaigns in the 19th arrondissement of Paris. She obtained 5,82% of the vote during the first ballot.
