= Éléonore Caroit =

French politician (born 1985)

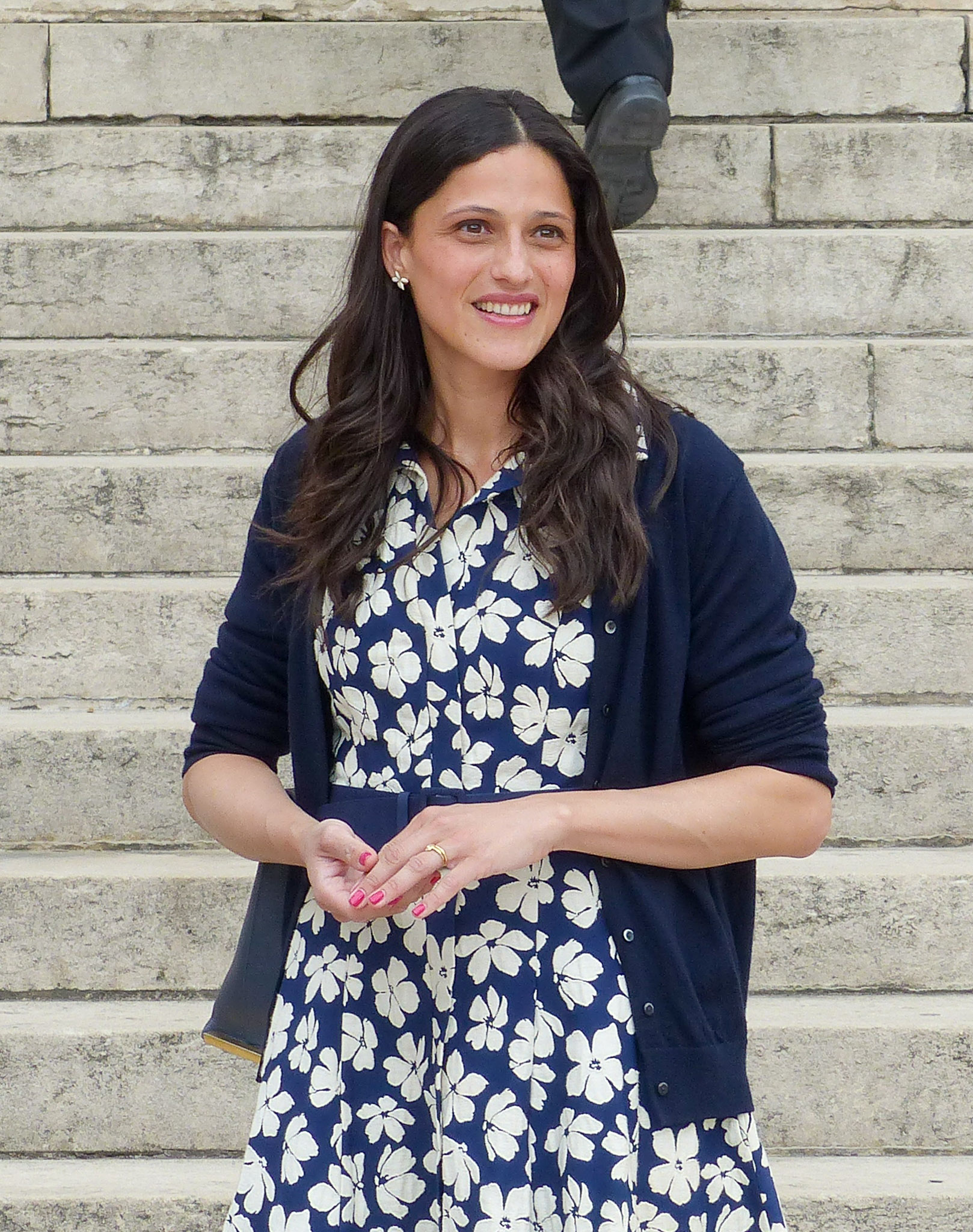

Minister Delegate for Francophonie, International Partnerships and the French Abroad
- Incumbent
- Assumed office 12 October 2025
- Prime Minister: Sébastien Lecornu
- Preceded by: Thani Mohamed Soilihi

Member of the National Assembly for the 2nd constituency for French citizens abroad
- In office 17 April 2023 – 12 November 2025
- Preceded by: Vacant
- Succeeded by: Benoît Larrouquis
- In office 22 June 2022 – 20 January 2023
- Preceded by: Paula Forteza
- Succeeded by: Vacant

Personal details
- Born: Éléonore Anne-Marie Caroit; 8 July 1985 (age 41) Paris, France
- Citizenship: France; Switzerland; Dominican Republic
- Party: Renaissance
- Parents: Jean-Michel Caroit (father); Carmen Amelia Cedeño (mother)
- Education: Sciences Po; Paris 1 Panthéon-Sorbonne University; Columbia Law School
- Occupation: Lawyer

Éléonore Anne-Marie Caroit (French pronunciation: [eleɔnɔʁ kaʁwa]; born 8 July 1985) is a French lawyer and politician who also holds Swiss and Dominican citizenship. A member of Renaissance (RE), she has been Minister Delegate for Francophonie, International Partnerships and the French Abroad in the second government of Prime Minister Sébastien Lecornu since 2025.

== Political career ==
Caroit represented the second constituency for French citizens abroad in the National Assembly for Renaissance from 2022 to 2025, with a brief interruption in 2023, when the Constitutional Council ordered an election re-run. Her constituency roughly encompasses Latin America.

In Parliament, Caroit served on the Committee on Foreign Affairs. In addition to her committee assignments, she chaired the French-Chilean Parliamentary Friendship Group from 2022 to 2024. She was also a member of the French delegation to the Inter-Parliamentary Union (IPU) from 2022 to 2024.

In 2025, she was appointed to the second government of Prime Minister Sébastien Lecornu as Minister Delegate for Francophonie, International Partnerships and the French Abroad.

== Political positions ==
Caroit is considered to be a centre-left politician.

== Other activities ==
- French Development Agency (AFD), member of the supervisory board (2023–2025)

== See also ==
- List of deputies of the 16th National Assembly of France
