= Jean-Claude Perez =

French politician (born 1964)

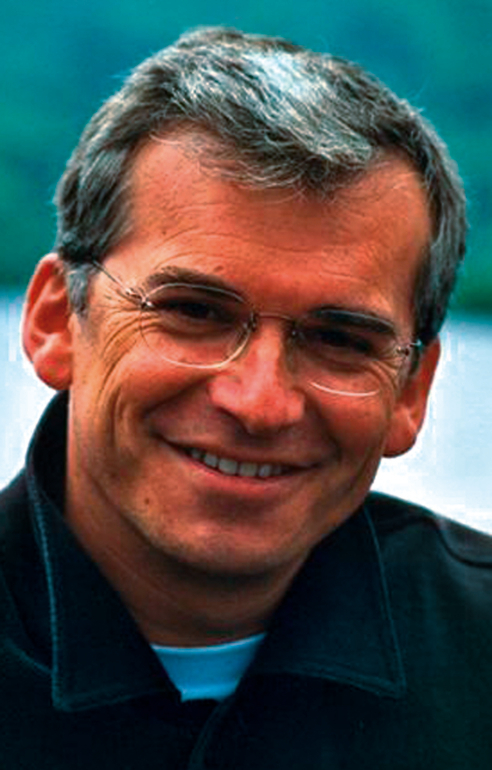

Member of the National Assembly for Aude's 1st constituency
- In office 12 June 1997 – 20 June 2017
- Preceded by: Gérard Larrat
- Succeeded by: Danièle Hérin

Mayor of Carcassonne
- In office 20 September 2009 – 6 April 2014
- Preceded by: Gérard Larrat
- Succeeded by: Gérard Larrat

Personal details
- Born: 11 March 1964 (age 62) Carcassonne, France
- Party: Renaissance (2024–present)
- Other political affiliations: Socialist Party (until 2016)
- Education: Université de Toulouse Le Mirail

Jean-Claude Perez (born 31 March 1964) is a French politician, and was a member of the National Assembly. He represented Aude's 1st constituency from 1997 to 2017, as a member of the Socialist Party and of the Socialiste, radical, citoyen et divers gauche parliamentary group. He was mayor of Carcassonne from 2009 to 2014.
