= Christophe Barthès =

French politician (born 1966)

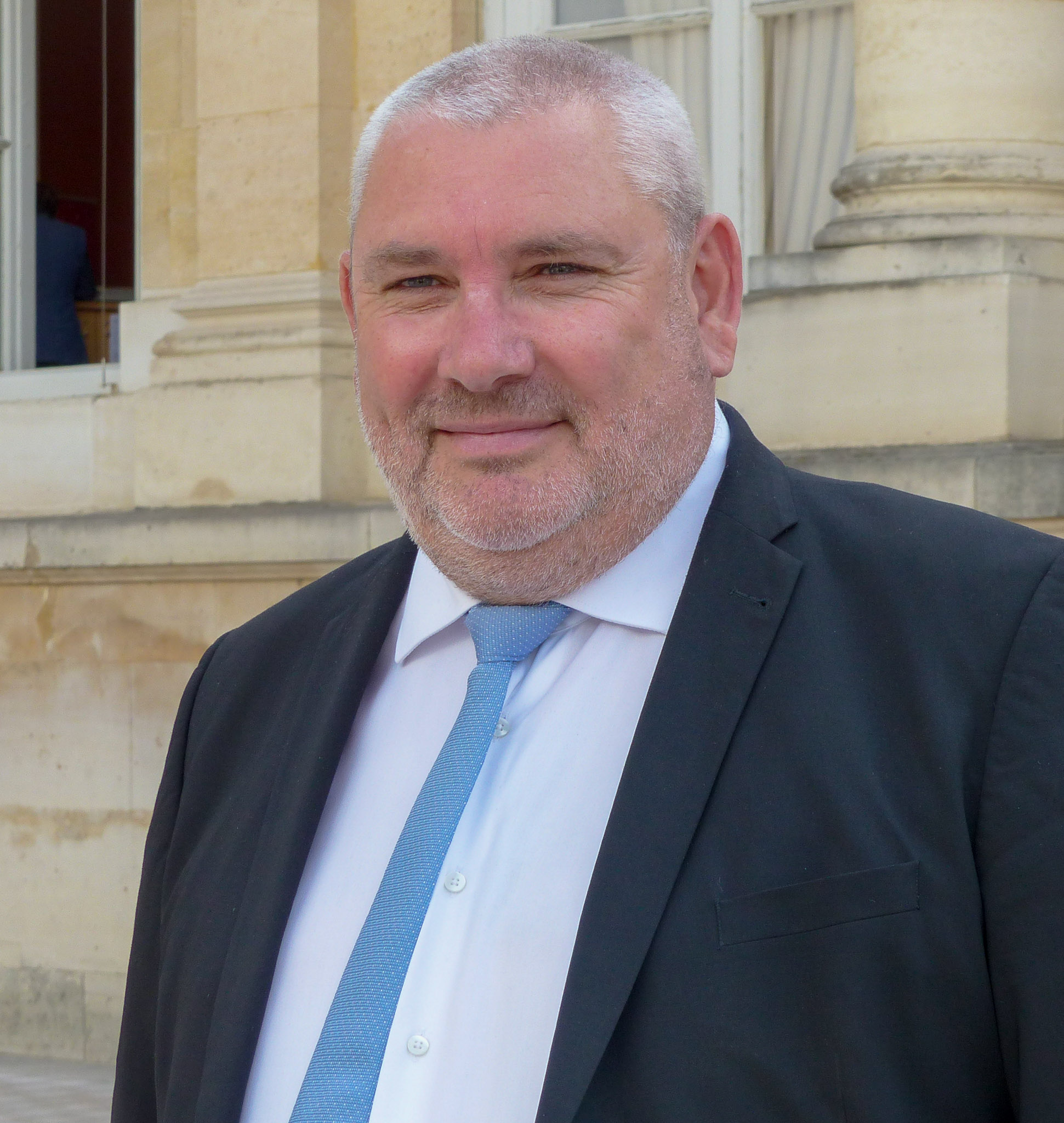

Mayor of Carcassonne
- Incumbent
- Assumed office 29 March 2026
- Preceded by: Gérard Larrat

Member of the National Assembly for Aude's 1st constituency
- In office 22 June 2022 – 20 April 2026
- Preceded by: Danièle Hérin
- Succeeded by: Édouard Jordan

Personal details
- Born: 12 October 1966 (age 59) Trèbes, France
- Party: National Rally (2007–present)
- Other political affiliations: Rally for the Republic (formerly); Rally for France (formerly); Union for a Popular Movement (formerly)
- Occupation: Winegrower, politician

Christophe Barthès (French pronunciation: [kʁistɔf baʁtɛs]; born 12 October 1966) is a French winegrower and politician who has been mayor of Carcassonne since 2026. A member of the National Rally (RN), he previously represented the 1st constituency of the Aude department in the National Assembly from 2022.

== Early career ==
Barthès is the owner of a winery in Trèbes, Aude. He is formerly affiliated with the Rally for the Republic, the Rally for France and the Union for a Popular Movement. In 2007 he joined the National Front (later renamed National Rally).

== Political career ==
In 2010 Barthès was elected to the Regional Council of Languedoc-Roussillon. In 2015, he was elected to the newly-formed Regional Council of Occitania. He was reelected in 2021. He sits on the committee for agriculture, agrifood and viticulture and for water and risk prevention on the council. In 2015, he became the departmental secretary of the National Front in Aude.

He led the National Front list in Trèbes in 2014 and the National Rally list in 2020. He sat as a municipal councillor in Trèbes from 2014 to 2022. In 2011, he ran in the canton of Peyriac-Minervois; in 2015 in the newly-formed canton of Trèbes; and in 2021 in the canton of La Montagne d'Alaric (formerly Trèbes).

In the 2017 legislative election, Barthès contested Aude's 1st constituency. He placed second with 41.3% of the second-round vote against Danièle Hérin of La République En Marche!, a deputy mayor of Carcassonne.

He contested the seat again in 2022 and won with 53.5% of the second-round vote. He was elected to the National Assembly along with two other National Rally deputies in all three of Aude's constituencies. A few days following his election, he accused a BFM TV columnist of having "contempt" for the "little people" after she stated, referring to Barthès, that "[one of the new deputies] was still on his tractor a few days ago and (...) is now landing at the National Assembly."

He was reelected in 2024 with 61.4% of the second-round vote against former presidential candidate Philippe Poutou of the New Anticapitalist Party (supported by the New Popular Front alliance).

At the 2026 municipal election, the list he led in Carcassonne won 40.4% of the second-round vote ahead of two other lists. Barthès was elected to the mayorship by the municipal council on 29 March 2026.
