= François Asselineau =

French politician and public official (born 1957)

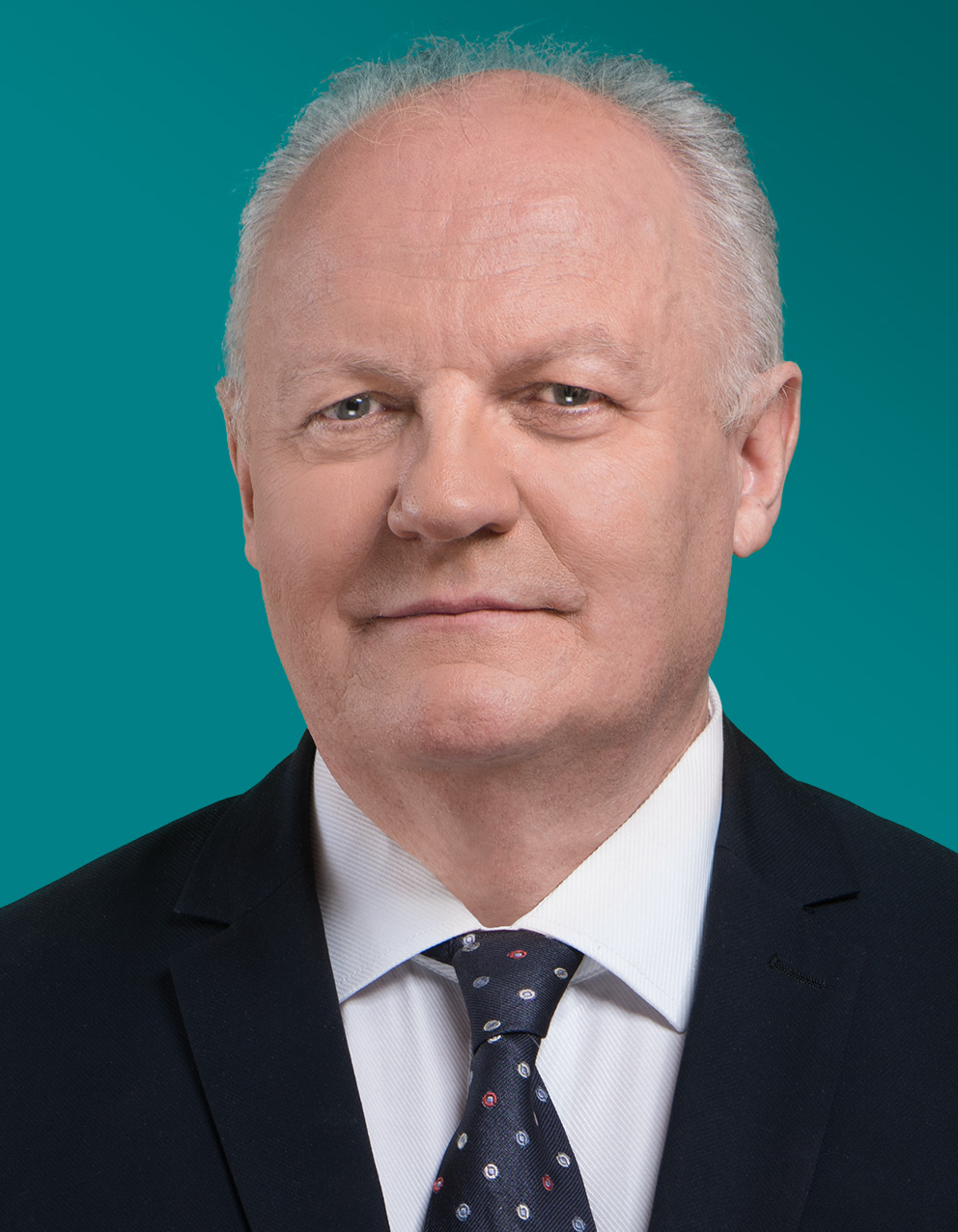

President of the Popular Republican Union
- Incumbent
- Assumed office 25 March 2007
- Preceded by: Office established

Councillor of Paris
- In office 25 March 2001 – 24 March 2008
- Constituency: 19th arrondissement

Personal details
- Born: 14 September 1957 (age 68) Paris, France
- Party: Popular Republican Union
- Education: HEC Paris; École nationale d'administration
- Occupation: Civil Servant; Politician
- Profession: Inspector General; Business School professor
- Website: francoisasselineau.fr

François Asselineau (French pronunciation: [fʁɑ̃swa asəlino], born 14 September 1957) is a French politician and an Inspector General for finances.

Asselineau was a member of the Rally for France (RPF) and UMP before creating his own political party the Popular Republican Union (Union Populaire Républicaine or UPR). His movement promotes France's unilateral withdrawal from the European Union, the Eurozone and NATO. Asselineau has been described as a souverainist, but does not self-identify as such. He identifies as being on neither side of the left–right political spectrum, while his career path has been described on Arrêt sur images as the classic one of a right-wing graduate of the École Nationale d'Administration (ENA), on the fringes of the far-right.

Asselineau has repeatedly accused the media of "censorship". In his critique, he includes French Wikipedia, whose contributors had once considered him insufficiently noteworthy to justify an article in it. The activism of his supporters to try to increase media coverage of Asselineau and the UPR has been noted by some observers.

He ran in the 2017 French presidential election as the "Frexit candidate". He was eliminated in the first round, earning only 0.92% of the vote. For the 2022 presidential election, he failed to secure the necessary number of 500 endorsements from elected officials in order to run.

== Education ==
Asselineau enrolled in HEC Paris where he graduated in 1980 with the MSc in Management. He enrolled at the École nationale d'administration (promotion "Léonard de Vinci", 1985).

== Career ==
Asselineau started his career in Japan in the department of economic expansion for National Service Overseas (CSNE). Served in 1985 as inspector General in the inspection générale des Finances.

From 1989 to 1990, he was chief of mission for the National Credit. He was also president of the direction of the Society for Economical and Financial Analysis and Diagnostic (SADEF). In 1991, he became chief of mission of the Asia-Oceania office at the Direction of Foreign Economical Relation (DREE) in the Ministry of Economy and Finance under the Pierre Bérégovoy government.

From 1994 to 1995, he served as counsellor for international affairs in the Ministry of Industry under the Edouard Balladur government.

In June 1995, he was named director of the office of the Ministry of Tourism. In 1996, he moved to the ministry of Foreign Affairs, where he was in charge of economic matters for Asia, Oceania and Latin America until the dissolution of parliament by Jacques Chirac in 1997.

== Political career ==
In 1999, François Asselineau got involved in politics by becoming a member of the Rally for France (RPF), a party created by Charles Pasqua and Philippe de Villiers. He became a member of the national bureau, director of studies and spokesman of the party until autumn 2005. On July 27, 2000, he became vice-director of the general council of the Hauts-de-Seine. He was in charge of economic and international affairs. On May 23, 2001, Charles Pasqua nominated François Asselineau as the director of his office of the presidency of the general council of Hauts-de-Seine where he worked until March 30, 2004, when Nicolas Sarkozy took over the position of Charles Pasqua.

On October 20, 2004, Nicolas Sarkozy appointed Asselineau as the director of the general delegation for economic intelligence within the Minister of Economy and Finance.

In November 2006, Asselineau joined the steering committee of Rally for an Independent and Sovereign France (RIF), a party created by Paul-Marie Coûteaux,

=== Municipal councillor ===
On March 19, 2001, he was elected as a member of the council of Paris in the 19th arrondissement of Paris. His list, a right-wing dissident list made with an agreement between Jean Tiberi and Charles Pasqua, was third with 15,78% in a triangular against a Rally for the Republic (RPR) list and unified left list composed with Socialist Party (PS). His campaign was marked by a radical rhetoric on security, with posters denouncing "six years of socialist laxity", supposed drug trafficking, alleged prostitution and an asserted lack of police forces.

On December 31, 2004, Asselineau decided to join the group Union for a Popular Movement (UMP) at the Council of Paris. On November 3, 2006, he decided to quit the group and seat with the non-inscrits just after Françoise de Panafieu, for whom he worked, was elected president of the council of Paris for the Union for a Popular Movement (UMP).

In September 2007, Asselineau participated in a dissident political group named Paris Libre with several other ex-UMP members. The group ran several lists against the Union for a Popular Movement (UMP), and Asselineau ran a list in the 17e arrondissement de Paris against Françoise de Panafieu. However, he then backtracked, denouncing consequent pressure on the members of his list.

== Creation of the UPR ==
On March 25, 2007, for the 50th anniversary of the Rome Treaty signature, he created the Popular Republican Union (UPR).

=== Election results ===
In January 2011, François Asselineau announced his intention to run for the 2012 French presidential election, and confirmed this intention in December 2011. However, he was only able to garner 17 of the required 500 endorsements from elected politicians necessary to be on the ballot. As a result, Asselineau called for a boycott of the presidential election.

Following the Cahuzac affair and the resignation of Jérôme Cahuzac, for whom Asselineau had worked as a civil servant in the Ministry of Finance, Asselineau ran for the legislative by-election in Lot-et-Garonne's 3rd constituency, with Régis Chamagne. They failed to reach the second round with a score of 189 votes (0.58%).

Asselineau ran for the 2014 European Parliament election as the head of the list for the Île-de-France constituency. He hoped that the UPR's agenda could rally voters disappointed by the current political system. Asselineau complained to the CSA for not having had access to mainstream media; he also claimed that the principle of equity for all candidates was actually undermined by the media, that tended to give voice to parties that were already well-known. He scored 0.56% of votes cast in his constituency.

== Political views ==
François Asselineau's 'souverainiste' platform has two main targets, the European Union and the United States. He insists that France should leave the Eurozone, the European Union, and NATO. According to Asselineau, the EU and NATO "as seen from Washington...are the political and military side of the same coin, that of the enthrallment of the European continent to their 'buffer zone' so as to surround and contain the Russian continental power". He says the process leading to European unification was launched solely upon orders from the American government.

Asselineau denies he is a "eurosceptic", preferring to call himself a "euro-atheist". He said on the French TV program On n'est pas couché that he opposes military intervention in Syria and Iraq.

Asselineau claims the 1944 Conseil national de la Résistance as the source of inspiration for his presidential program in 2012, including "re-nationalisations" and "quality public services". Asselineau does not say what should be done about "the major national issues such as nuclear power in France, the French debt crisis or the decisions to be made about immigration, [which] should be addressed through referendums", "once France has left the European Union".

Asselineau opposes French COVID-19 immunity passports. In July 2021, Asselineau tested positive for the disease and advocated the use of Ivermectin as treatment.

== Controversies ==
=== Accusations of sexual harassment ===
In 2020, Asslineau was accused of sexual misconduct by two men. In May 2020, Asselineau's former driver and press secretary filed a complaint against him for sexual harassment and sexual assault. Another complaint was filed by another former staffer against Asselineau for psychological and sexual harassment.

On 5 February 2021, Asselineau was put under investigation and placed under judicial supervision for the alleged sexual assault, sexual and moral harassment of two of his former collaborators. He has denied all the allegations made against him.

In December 2024, the charges were dismissed. In May 2026, the Court of Appeal of Paris reversed that decision and ruled that Asselineau should stand trial.

== Electoral performance ==
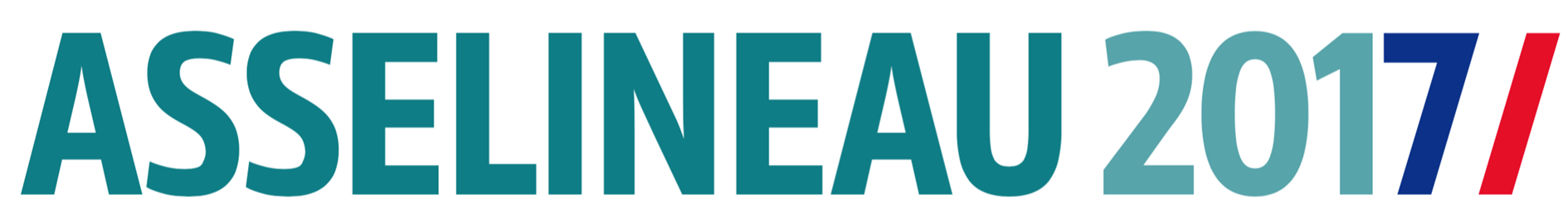
Logo of François Asselineau

President of the French Republic
Election year	Candidate	# of 1st round votes	% of 1st round vote	# of 2nd round votes	% of 2nd round vote	Won/Loss
2017	François Asselineau	332,547	0.92% #9	__	__	Lost

== See also ==
- Popular Republican Union (2007)
- List of political parties in France
