= Jacques Cheminade =

French-Argentinian politician (born 1941)

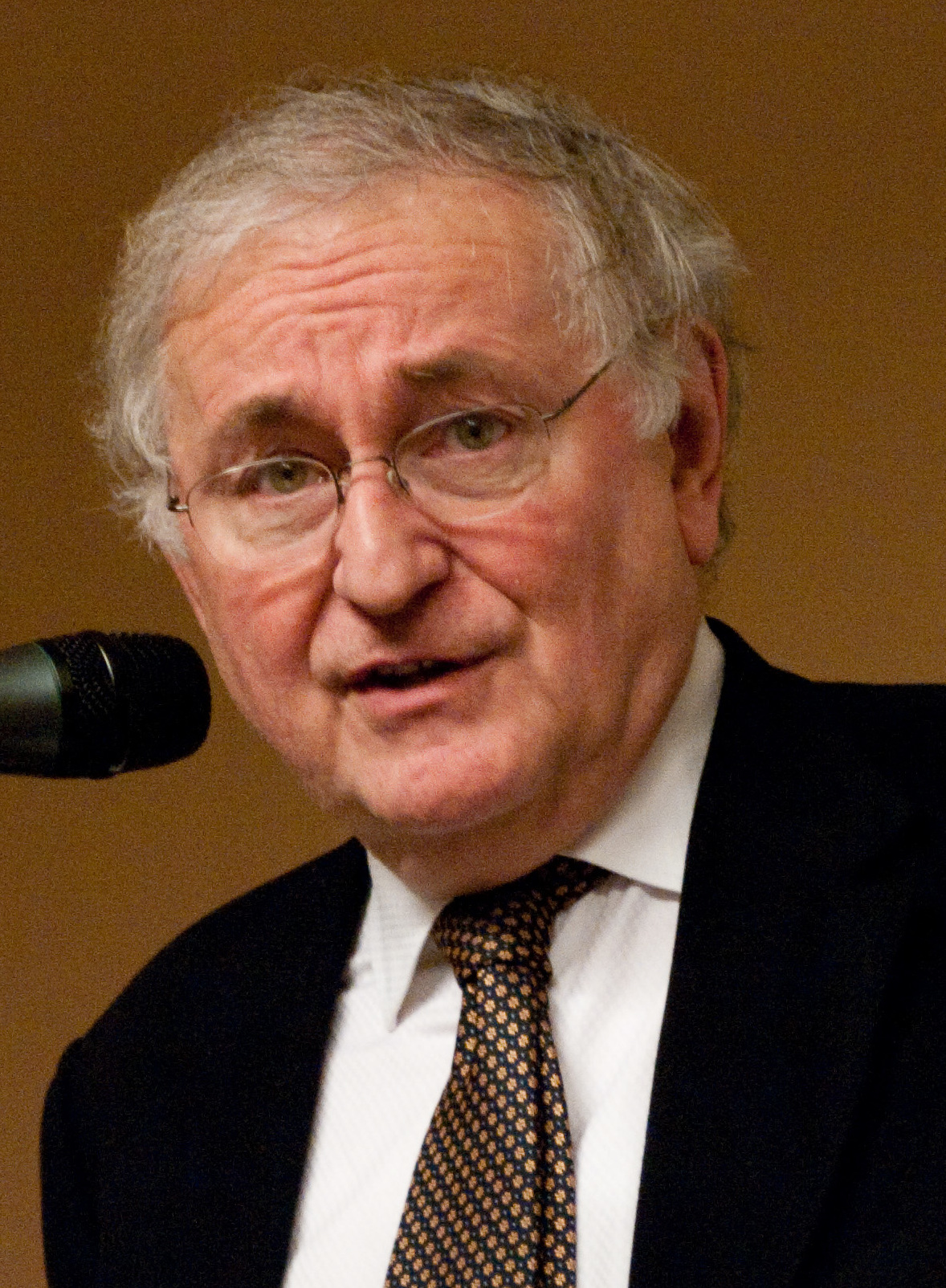
- Born: Jacques Guy Cheminade; 20 August 1941 (age 85); Buenos Aires, Argentina
- Education: HEC Paris; École nationale d'administration
- Occupation: Civil servant until 1981
- Known for: French perennial presidential candidate (1995, 2012, 2017), representative of Lyndon LaRouche in France
- Political party: Solidarité et progrès (1996–present)
- Other political affiliations: National Caucus of Labor Committees (1974–1977); Parti ouvrier européen (1978–1989); Rassemblement pour une France libre (1989–1991); Fédération pour une nouvelle solidarité (1991–1996)

Jacques Guy Cheminade (French pronunciation: [ʒak ʃəminad]; born 20 August 1941) is a French politician, activist and former diplomat. He is the head of the Solidarity and Progress (SP) party, the French arm of the LaRouche movement. He has thrice run for President of France (1995, 2012, 2017), always placing last.

== Education and professional life ==
Cheminade was born in Buenos Aires, Argentina from French parents. He returned to France at age 18. After graduating from HEC Paris, law school, as well as the École nationale d'administration (ÉNA), Cheminade became a career officer in the Directorate of Foreign Economic Relations of the Ministry of Economy, Finance and Industry, a position he held until 1981.

== Political career ==
=== Discovery of LaRouche's ideas ===
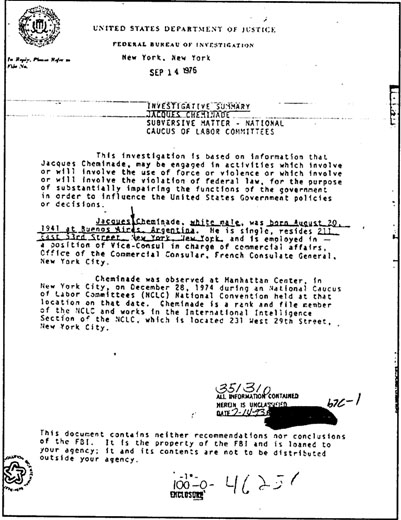
FBI document on Jacques Cheminade (1976).

Cheminade met Lyndon LaRouche in early 1974 in New York, where he was a commercial attaché to the French embassy from 1972 to 1977. He compares this encounter to Socratic midwifery. According to a 1976 FBI document, he was then a "rank and file member" in the National Caucus of Labor Committees, a political organization directed by Lyndon LaRouche which had founded its own "intelligence units" in 1971, where he "work[ed] in the International Intelligence Section" (see document, left). His return to France in 1977 was motivated by a desire to devote himself "full time to political activities and the advocacy of Mr. LaRouche's ideas and policies".

=== 1978: Return to France ===
In 1978, he was the Parti Ouvrier Européen (POE) candidate for the legislative election in the 18th arrondissement of Paris (25th circonscription), and obtained 0.12% of the votes. His program was:

- the creation of military force with beam weapons to protect Europe against the USSR;
- the fight against drugs and for the promotion of moral values;
- the fight against the IMF and against the economic crisis.

=== 1981: Head of POE, support for Giscard ===
In 1981, Cheminade became the general secretary of the European Workers Party and the president of the French section of the Schiller Institute, and took a leave from his work as a civil servant. He tried unsuccessfully to obtain the endorsements necessary to run for the presidential election of 1981, and called before the first round to vote for Valéry Giscard d'Estaing, saying: "I call upon all my partisans and friends to vote for Giscard d'Estaing. Three reasons prescribe that choice: his nuclear policy, his conception of détente and his commitment to fight monetarism. Moreover, he is in the best position to defeat François Mitterrand, whose candidacy poses the gravest and most immediate danger".

=== 1982–1985: Defense of SDI ===
In 1982, Cheminade published a statement presenting the POE as a "pole of reference for all anti-Malthusian forces committed to reestablish economic growth and cultural morality" and advocating a program "similar to that of Lyndon LaRouche's National Democratic Policy Committee", which included at that time freedom from "British domination of American foreign policy", worldwide public works projects, the development of nuclear energy "to stop genocide" in undeveloped nations, a crackdown on an international drug cartel, and a return to classic education to counter "the genocidalists' plan for our youth".

In 1983, Cheminade published a statement on the danger of "new fascism" posed by an alleged plot against French president François Mitterrand by some of his socialist ministers, including Jacques Delors and Michel Rocard. The next year, he published an article in Executive Intelligence Review, accusing French president François Mitterrand of being a "Soviet agent of influence", as well as "the servant of the "families" involved in the Swiss-promoted "synarchist" operations that launched the fascist movement back in the 1920s on an international scale".

During the 1984 European elections, where the POE list he headed obtained 0.09% of the votes, Cheminade defended a program centered on the fight against three threats: an "immediate Russian threat that remains unperceived if not strongly favored"); an economic and financial one caused by "rampant Malthusianism and the role of the International Monetary Fund"; and a moral and intellectual decay, exemplified by the consumption of dangerous drugs. His program also referenced the ideas of Lazare Carnot, a "Republican scientist", Jean Jaurès, the only Socialist "with broad ideas" and the only one who "knew Leibniz and the pre-Socratic philosophers", as well as Jean-Baptiste Colbert, who also "understood the epistemological foundations of France".

During the period of time from 1982 to 1984, according to his own statement, Cheminade was involved in arranging a number of meetings between "French government, military and political leaders, and Mr. LaRouche [...] primarily on the subject of the SDI [the Strategic Defense Initiative ("SDI")] and its European complement, the Tactical Defense Initiative ("TDI")".

During the 1985 county elections, where his party presented candidates in 50 counties, Cheminade declared the POE "wholeheartedly supports Reagan's SDI program, a development program for the third world and a change in economic policy away from the International Monetary Fund". Later the same year, he said "unless the policies of the IMF are reversed, the Soviets will rule Europe and most of the rest of the world within this decade".

=== 1986: French PANIC proposals ===
In 1986, while in the United States the Larouche movement presented the PANIC proposal, Cheminade, at a press conference held together with John Seale – a British physician who claimed that HIV had been created in a Soviet laboratory as part of a plot to destroy the United States, "ridiculed" the "condom campaigns" run in many countries and claimed that AIDS could be transmitted by saliva – presented the draft of a law providing for every resident of France to be screened for AIDS every six months, and every non-resident crossing the border into France to show an AIDS-negative test certificate dating from less than six months before, or be tested, before he could be admitted into France. Another proposition of the same draft was to quarantine "full-blown AIDS cases until an effective vaccine and cure are found". Later the same year, he contributed to a conference organized by the French section of the Fusion Energy Foundation on "The Importance of the Method of Louis Pasteur for Conquering AIDS and Other Pandemics", where Dr Whiteside developed his views on the transmission of AIDS by mosquito bites, with a speech where he called "upon France to defend Science in the face of the brutal irrationalist attacks on Science".

=== 1986: First appearance on national TV ===
During the campaign for the legislative election of 1986, the POE having presented more than 75 candidates in 27 departments, Cheminade was for the first time granted 8 minutes of national television time, and presented a program which included:

- an abolition of the International Monetary Fund;
- an industrialization of the Third World;
- a French Strategic Defense Initiative in cooperation with the United States, and deployment of the neutron bomb;
- a "Colbertist" approach to finance productive investments;
- an elimination of EC quotas to increase farm output;
- a war on drugs and terrorism;
- and an introduction of a classical education curriculum.

=== 1987–1989: The end of the POE ===
In 1987, Cheminade, described by Daniel Carton in Le Monde as the leader of a "far-right small group", announced he would run for the 1988 presidential election with a five-point program: a Marshall plan for the third world, a reform of the international monetary system, a biological defense initiative, the relaunch of spatial programs and a European version of the SDI. He did not succeed to gather the necessary number of endorsements to back him.

In 1989, Cheminade headed the POE's list for the European Parliament election, called Rassemblement pour une France libre (Movement for a Free France). Its program was to fight against "European financial cartels dominated by the London stock market" and to promote "the construction of Europe by means of large public works". Larousse's Journal of the year considered these positions were close to those expressed by the far-right politician Jean-Marie Le Pen. The list obtained 0.18% of the votes.

He remained general secretary of the Parti Ouvrier Européen until its dissolution for bankruptcy in 1989. The POE was replaced in 1991 by the Fédération pour une Nouvelle Solidarité (FNS, Federation for a New Solidarity).

=== 1991–1995: The FNS replaces the POE ===
In 1993, he was the sole candidate of his movement for the legislative election in Paris and obtained 0.32% of the votes.

=== 1992: Theft trial ===
In 1992, Cheminade was condemned with suspension to 15 months of imprisonment for theft. He was charged of having received, through 3 associations, 1.2 million francs from an elderly lady with Alzheimer's disease. An appellate court confirmed in 1996 the qualification of theft, but reduced the sentence to 9 months with suspension. The judgement mentioned "conditioning" by "professional canvassers". The reduced sentence allowed Cheminade to benefit from an amnesty law.

=== 1995: Presidential candidate ===
In 1995, Cheminade obtained 556 endorsements from mayors, allowing him to run in the presidential election. Eric Incyan and Sylvie Kaufman in Le Monde described the obtaining of these endorsements as the result of a "generalized phone harassment". According to Daniel Hourquebie in Le Monde, Cheminade's envoys targeted the mayors of small rural villages, presumed to favor small candidates and 7 out of 8 of Cheminade's endorsers in the department of Gers administered municipalities of less than 165 inhabitants. According to Renaud Dely in Libération, they pointed out to left-leaning mayors that Cheminade "filled a void" in the absence of Jacques Delors, while offering them a copy of Jean Jaurès doctoral thesis republished in 1994 by Cheminade's party press with a foreword by Cheminade (described as an absurd rambling by Roger-Pol Droit in Le Monde; to right-leaning mayors, the "need of defense against Russia"; to thoses with a concern for environment, his concern for a re-emphasis of the rural world. The mayors of Ayguetinte, Bézues-Bajon and Saint-Justin said Cheminade's envoys had been the first ones to contact them. The mayor of Ayguetinte said he wanted to express his dissatisfaction with the political class. Other mayors commented on the insistence of Cheminade's emissaries : The mayor of Thoux said he finally accepted to be left in peace. The mayor of Planèzes that he was constantly called, at any hour, at home or at the office. Three mayors from Creuse considered they had been "deceived" on Cheminade's program and political career. The mayor of Saint-Junien-la-Bregère said he was for sorry to have signed for somebody "who does not seem to be very honest, though I don't have a proof". The mayor of Sannat said on television: "I was told they were against racism, they seemed to be leaning to the left and he was a small candidate. But when I learned he was at the far-right and had been condemned, I jumped". Cheminade replied they had been harassed by journalists who told them he was a crank and his party was a sect.

His speeches, invoking the patronages of Jean Jaurès and Charles de Gaulle, were centered on a "speculative cancer" destroying the world economy and for which Cheminade was blaming the "financial oligarchy" of the City of London, Wall Street, the Federal Reserve and the IMF, as well as their French "relays", such as the Banque de France. He advocated bankrupting agents of the international monetary and financial system, a "new Marshall Plan" and credit control.

Cheminade obtained 0.27% of the votes.

According to El Pais, his campaign raised little interest except for the origin of its funding. According to Cécile Chambaud in Le Monde, LaRouche was a "billionaire" and Cheminade's POE had always benefited of "large financial means". LaRouche sent a letter to Le Monde claiming he did not own his residence and his only revenue was his salary at Executive Intelligence Review". Didier Micoine wrote in Le Parisien that Jacques Cheminade claimed to have a taxable income of 42,000 francs, to live with 6,000 francs a month and to own a 10-year-old Peugeot 305. Renaud Leblond and Loïc Stavidrès reported in L'Express Cheminade owned a 60-square-metre (650 sq ft) apartment in Paris, earned 3,000 francs a month and benefited from the remains of a family inheritance. Nevertheless, according to Le Monde, Cheminade claimed to be the largest donator of his campaign.

=== Constitutional Court ruling over campaign finance ===
The 1995 presidential election was the first one for which the Constitutional Council had to appreciate the regularity of campaign accounts, in application of a law passed in January 1990. The Council examined the campaign accounts with what Jean-Claude Zarka, a professor of constitutional law, called "obvious caution" and Pierre Moscovici, the campaign treasurer of the socialist Lionel Jospin, "eminent diplomacy". The campaign accounts of 8 candidates were approved, some with modifications, but those of Jacques Cheminade were rejected. According to Zarka, Cheminade was "financed after the vote by substantial gifts from private persons". The ruling of the Council said 2.3 million francs of private loans had to be qualified as gifts because of their relative importance in the accounts and the absence of interests. Moreover, 1.7 million francs, "over a third of the total of his declared receipts", was contracted after the second round. Following the rejection of his accounts, Cheminade was deprived of the lump-sum reimbursement of his campaign expenses and required to reimburse a million francs he had received from the state at the start of the campaign. In further observations, the Council recommended private loans to presidential candidates should be prohibited. Notwithstanding, Cheminade claimed the Civil code did not require a loan to bear interest, an assertion later confirmed by a lawyer specialized in civil law consulted by Le Journal du Dimanche. He also claimed Roland Dumas, the president of the council, had a conflict of interest with him, having represented his opponents in a libel case some years earlier.

Cheminade appealed to the European Court of Justice, but his appeal was rejected. The Court estimated "the patrimonial incidence of a procedure pertaining to the conditions of practice of a right of political nature does nor confer to it a civil nature" and "the decision of the Constitutional Council has not deprived the plaintiff of property in any amount of money but has only obliged the plaintiff to reimburse to the state a million francs because he did not meet the legal conditions to claim the contractual reimbursement of the campaign expenses".

In November 2010, in the wake of an investigation on the financing of Édouard Balladur's 1995 presidential campaign, Raphaëlle Bacqué and Pascale Robert-Diard wrote in Le Monde the Constitutional Council had hesitated to validate his campaign accounts, as they showed 10 million francs in receipts of unknown origin. This, according to Le Parisien, was later confirmed by Jacques Robert, a member of the court. According to Les Inrockuptibles, Jacques Robert said: "In order to show that we were independent, we invalidated Jacques Cheminade, even though he had only committed minor errors". Raphaëlle Bacqué commented in Le Monde this revelation provided Cheminade a new argument to bail himself out of the litigation with the tax authority which followed the rejection of his campaign accounts.

=== Since 1996: S&P replaces FNS ===
Since 1996, he has been the chairman of one of LaRouche's political parties, Solidarité et Progrès (Solidarity and Progress).

In 1996, Cheminade wrote an article in Executive Intelligence Review entitled "Time To Destroy The Mythology of Bonapartism". He claimed "the British-French 'Entente Cordiale' is, today, the main threat to world history [...] and it is Napoleon who burned the French state to ashes, and his degenerate brothers and descendants, his famiglia, who sold whatever they had to the British". According to this article, Napoleon had been "brought to madness" by the "mental control" of the British "oligarchical order", becoming a "pirate for the oligarchs". Cheminade added : "Napoleon, like Hitler, was first promoted by the British, as were the Jacobins before them, to destroy France, and to prevent a truly republican option". He further claimed : "Beyond the destruction of the French nation-state, what comes clearly to the light of day, is the second historical role assigned to Napoleon: the promotion of paganism, to destroy the humanist world liberation project. Against such a project, Napoleon was the dangerous but useful idiot of the oligarchs".

In 1997, shortly after the death of Princess Diana, Cheminade wrote an article in Executive Intelligence Review, next to an article by Lyndon LaRouche claiming "officials of France's Socialist government [...] supervised the death of Princess Diana" and introducing Cheminade's own article as "an insider's view of the decadent, doomed tradition which Mitterrand's Presidency set into place". Cheminade's own article claimed President Mitterrand was "an agent of British influence", "all governments in France, since at least 1980, have continuously and persistently betrayed the sovereignty of their nation-state [...] It is uniquely in that context, that the Lady Diana case can be understood".

In 1998, Cheminade claimed his party was the only one "to call for a positive alternative to the euro, with a New Bretton Woods system [and] a Eurasian Land-Bridge". The same year, he claimed the trial of Roland Dumas and the murder of prefect Claude Erignac were "connected [...]to the international financial and monetary implosion, and to the British games in Europe and beyond". In 1999, he wrote : "The cause of the war is not Iraq, or Yugoslavia, the United States, or even Britain. It is the financial oligarchy of the City of London and Wall Street which has declared war on the people, in Africa, in Russia, and elsewhere, where living standards and life expectancy are collapsing. The leading role in all cases has been played by the British."

In 2000, Cheminade wrote "the assassins of the Kennedy brothers and Martin Luther King [...] were the same people who tried to murder de Gaulle, for the same oligarchical reasons". The same year, after the crash of Air France Flight 4590, he claimed it could be due to a sabotage, as the French authorities had "challenged the Anglo-American oligarchy in many areas".

In 2000, Cheminade announced he would be a candidate in the 2002 presidential election. He did not succeed to reach the necessary 500 endorsements, gathering only 406 of them. He sued Nicolas Miguet, another presidential candidate, for slander and was granted damages. Cheminade filed a complaint to the Conseil constitutionnel, arguing he had been the subject of press attacks to deter mayors from endorsing him. The claim was rejected.

In 2001, Cheminade proposed the issuance of a gold based euro, "as a measure of national emergency under the present circumstances", with reference to "initiatives taken in Russia and Malaysia going in the same direction, with for example the issuance of the Russian golden chervonets". This was part of what LaRouche and Cheminade called a "new Bretton Woods", defined by Cheminade in 2003 as "a system of stable exchanges, based on a common reference, a gold-reserve system (and not a gold standard system), gold being used among states to settle their accounts, but not as a basis for credit".

In 2004, Cheminade and Eric Sauzé, his party's candidate in the March 2004 Lyon county election were found guilty of slander against Dominique Perben, the minister of Justice, for the comparison in pictures of Philippe Pétain shaking hands with Adolf Hitler in Montoire-sur-le-Loir and Perben recently doing the same with U.S. Attorney General John Ashcroft. Cheminade was condemned to pay a fine of 15,000 euros. The judgement considered the leaflet made "a comparison between two periods of the history of France that have strictly nothing in common in terms of human and citizens’ rights" and Cheminade had "the objective disposition of resources that allowed them to print 25,000 copies of [the] leaflet". the judgement was confirmed in appeal in 2006.

In the 2004 European election, Cheminade headed list called Nouvelle solidarité in Île-de-France, which obtained 0.11% of the votes.

In 2004, during the restructuring of the Argentinian debt, which laRouche compared to ""transform[ing] Argentina into another Auschwitz", Cheminade organized protests in Paris, such as the distribution of leaflets claiming "that what happens in Argentina, will happen tomorrow in France, Germany, and all of Europe, and the United States, unless we take the road LaRouche has indicated, which is the New Bretton Woods" or organizing a demonstration in front of the headquarters of Lazard, the bank advising the Argentinian government.

Cheminade opposed the European constitution proposed in the 2005 referendum, claiming it was a policy leading to fascism and to war.

In November 2005, Cheminade was a panelist at the conference of Axis for Peace organized by the Voltaire network in Belgium.

In the 2007 French presidential race, he endorsed Ségolène Royal.

=== 2012: Second presidential candidacy ===
On 31 January 2012 Cheminade announced that he had obtained the necessary 500 endorsements from elected officials that are required for ballot status in the presidential election. Cheminade ran on a platform of:

- separation of commercial banking from investment banking, to end the "casino economy."
- a system of public credit for major development projects.
- investment in "human creativity."
- a Eurasian/Transpacific alliance against the "world of finance."
- the removal of heads of state who "lead us blindly into chaos and war."

He obtained 89,000 votes (0.25% of the votes) nationwide.

=== 2017: Third presidential candidacy ===
In the first round of voting for the 2017 French presidential election, Cheminade was in last place of 11 candidates, receiving 65,598 votes, or 0.18% of votes cast.
