= Popular Republican Union (2007) =

French political party

Popular Republican Union Union Populaire Républicaine
- President: François Asselineau
- Founder: François Asselineau
- Founded: 25 March 2007
- Split from: Rally for France
- Headquarters: 28, rue Basfroi, 75011 Paris
- Membership: 35,800
- Ideology: Souverainism; Hard Euroscepticism; Economic nationalism Anti-Americanism; Syncretism
- Political position: Big tent Right-wing to far-right (alleged)
- Colours: Blue-green and white
- Slogan: « L'union du peuple pour rétablir la démocratie » (“The people's union to restore democracy”)
- National Assembly: 0 / 577
- Senate: 0 / 348
- European Parliament: 0 / 74
- Regional Councils: 0 / 1,880
- General Councils: 0 / 4,108
- Mayors: 4 / 34,967

Party flag
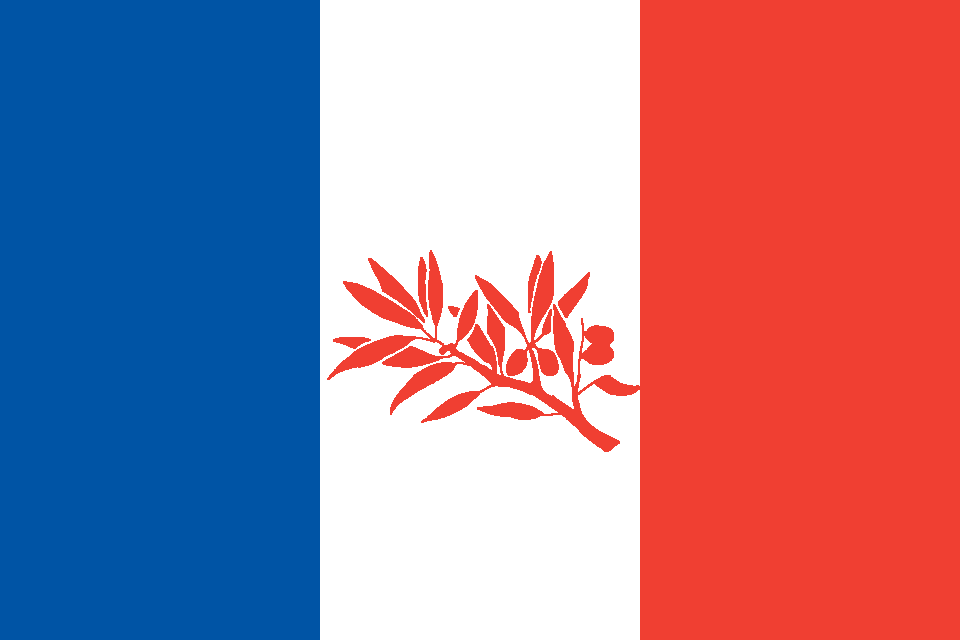

Website
- www.upr.fr

The Popular Republican Union (French: Union Populaire Républicaine) is a political party in France, founded in 2007 by François Asselineau. The ideology of the party is a hard Eurosceptic, and seeks the withdrawal of France from the European Union and the Eurozone.

== History ==
=== Foundation ===
After leaving the UMP (2006) and the Rally for an Independent and Sovereign France (RIF) where Asselineau was a member of the steering committee for 3 months, in 2007, to coincide with the 50th anniversary of the signing of the Rome Treaty, he created the Popular Republican Union (UPR).

=== 2012 presidential election ===
Asselineau confirmed his candidacy for the 2012 French presidential election in December 2011 during the national congress of the party. Asselineau was not among the ten candidates officially endorsed by the Constitutional Council as he could muster only 17 signatures from elected officials out of the necessary 500

=== 2012 legislative elections ===
Asselineau and Régis Chamagne ran for the legislative election in the Lot-et-Garonne's 3rd constituency UPR failed to reach the second round, receiving less than one half of one percent of the vote.

=== 2014 European Parliament election ===
The party participated in the 2014 European Parliament election. However, a limited budget restricted active campaign mailings to only thirty departments. UPR scored 0.41% of votes cast for France and Asselineau scored 0.56% of votes cast in the Île-de-France constituency.

=== 2015 departmental elections ===
UPR ran in the 2015 departmental elections with 14 lists out of the 2,054 cantons. They intended to inform electors about UPR's policy program and frame the domestic situation as the consequence of national and international circumstances. They were hoping to score honorably.

=== 2015 regional elections ===
In the regional elections of 2015, the UPR ran just under 2,000 candidates in the 12 new continental metropolitan areas and in an overseas region, Reunion Island, which Slate called an "amazing performance for this political formation without elected, nor public funding." François Asselineau was the leader in Île-de-France. The UPR proposes "the organization of referendums on major regional issues, such as the Olympic Games in Île-de-France or Notre-Dame-des-Landes in the Pays-de-la-Loire," referendums of popular initiative at the regional level," the renovation of high schools and the improvement of public transport.

On the national level, the UPR collected 0.87% of the votes cast (189,330 votes). In the Ile-de-France region, the list led by François Asselineau received 0.94% of the votes cast (29,755 votes). The UPR asked voters to abstain on the second round of the election.

=== 2017 presidential election ===
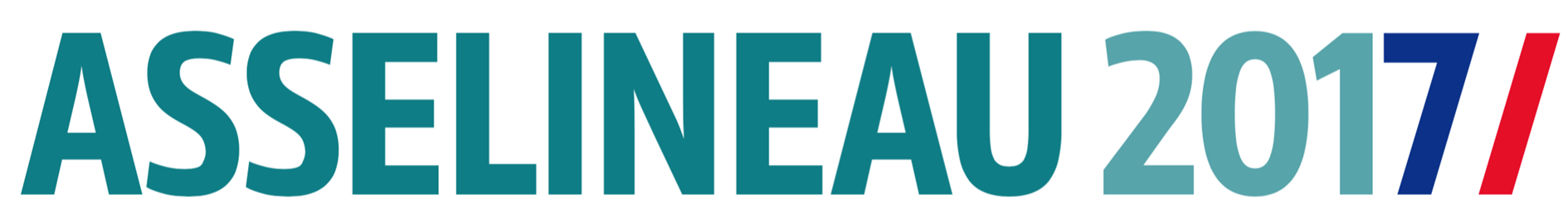
Campaign logo of François Asselineau

Asselineau declared that he would seek to run in the 2017 French presidential election, and managed to secure the 500 necessary sponsorships required to be listed on the first-round ballot. He got 332,547 votes (0.92%), coming in 9th place.

== Ideology ==
UPR runs on an anti-EU platform stating that all French policy decisions are made by an "unelected oligarchy, not French," leading to the political disaffection of the French public, and that the continued rule of the EU over European affairs will lead to a "global apartheid". UPR promotes withdrawal from the European Union and the euro by invoking TEU Article 50 as a first step to get France out of its current crisis by establishing full domestic control capital, goods and person flow regulation. On the basis of military sovereignty, UPR also wants France to withdraw from NATO.

UPR also favors nationalisation of entities such as TF1, La Poste, Gaz de France, highways, water management and troubled banks.

== Policy ==
- Constitutional reforms would only be allowed by referendum
- Reintroduction of the articles of the Constitution regarding "Conspiracy against the state" and "Treachery of the President", which had been removed in 1993 and 2007 respectively
- The instauration of popular initiative referendums like in Switzerland
- When the protest votes win an election, the election will be reorganised excluding the previous candidates
- To stop forced regroupments of communes
- To withdraw France from the EU, Eurozone and NATO
- To improve relationships with Russia, China, Arab states and Latin American states
- To be a non-aligned country
- To prohibit electronic voting
- To establish a Constitutional court like the Federal Constitutional Court in Germany
- To establish a quorum of 60% of parliament attendance
- To make media's fund public
- To protect whistleblowers such as Edward Snowden and Julian Assange
- To nationalise water, electricity, railways, highways, the communication company Orange, banks receiving public aid and the post
- To ban lobbying inside the parliament
- To make think tanks' fund public
- To raise the minimum wage to 1300 euros per month from 1153 euros per month
- To establish a minimum retirement benefit of 950 euros per month
- To ban genetically modified crops

== Relationship with the media and Internet activism ==
In February 2012, François Asselineau and his party, UPR, claimed they were "barred from the major media" ("barrés des grands médias") and "banned from going on the air" ("interdits d'antenne") as "[their] ideas are upsetting" ("[leur] discours dérange"). In 2014, UPR described itself as being "the most censored party in France".

On 23 April 2014, François Asselineau's party sent a registered letter to Conseil supérieur de l'audiovisuel (Audiovisual Superior Council) to demand "urgent action regarding the mainstream broadcasting media to have them accept UPR at last in their broadcasts".

The "news blackout" that Asselineau allegedly had to deal with was criticized again after the 2014 European elections, as his party obtained slightly more votes than Nouveau Parti anticapitaliste (0.41% vs 0.39%) without further attracting attention from the mainstream media.

In March 2012, Asselineau complained about the "censorship" he faced on French Wikipedia from which his article had been deleted several times for lack of renown. In February 2013, UPR complained about what it called "the ill treatment of François Asselineau and UPR on Wikipedia", with an extended report on the subject established by the "Groupe Wiki de l'UPR – Cybermilitantisme" (the "UPR Wiki Group- Internet activism").

Asselineau and his team are very active on the Internet: UPR claim to have developed "solely on the Internet" ("exclusivement en ligne") and bank above all on this activism to try to become notable. Rudy Reichstadt characterizes UPR as "a real phenomenon on the Internet", noting that it is "difficult to miss it when one is interested in the conspiracist circles" ("difficile de passer à côté lorsqu'on s'intéresse à la mouvance complotiste"). In 2012, UPR created the position of "national manager for Internet activism" ("responsable national au cybermilitantisme"), whose responsibility is to develop and coordinate the various people conducting such activism ("actions cybermilitantes").

However, there has been some backlash to this activism. Laurent de Boissieu mentions the harassment that "every journalist has had to deal with, one day or another, at the hands of some UPR activists". Laurent Ruquier likewise noted that he invited François Asselineau to On n'est pas couché because of incessant Twitter pressure. After the broadcast of this program, an article on the collaborative website of L'Obs (Le Plus) expressed doubts about the granting of speaking time to "this kind of conspiracist", while Causeur suggested that Laurent Ruquier had in fact invited Asselineau in order to ridicule his anti-European ideas.

On 28 October 2018, the CSA considered that France 5 has failed to comply with its obligation of rigour by presenting the UPR as an extreme right-wing party.

== Membership ==
UPR claim to be a growing party despite what they deem to be "a blacklisting from the national media". The party has thus developed exclusively online strategies; Asselineau's conferences, for instance, have gathered more than two million views. UPR states theirs is the most visited French political party website as evidenced by their Alexa rank.

In 2013, the university researcher, Jean-Yves Camus expressed doubt about the veracity of their reported membership figures.

As of 15 December 2016, UPR reported 14,000 members, with an average growth of 26 members per day.

The Republican Popular Union (UPR) is the only French party to display the number of its members in real time on its website.

Date	Membership	Source
11 February 2018	30,000	
21 October 2017	29,000	
18 April 2017	25,000	
21 February 2017	17,000	
15 December 2016	14,000	
25 February 2015	>7,000	
21 May 2014	5,000	
3 March 2014	4,200	
24 September 2013	3,300	
10 June 2013	≤3,000	
29 May 2013	2,960	
29 February 2012	~1,000	

== Electoral results ==
President of the French Republic
Election year	Candidate	# of 1st round votes	% of 1st round vote	# of 2nd round votes	% of 2nd round vote	Won/Loss
2017	François Asselineau	332,547	0.92% #9	__	__	Lost

Other elections
Year	Election	# of 1st round votes	% of 1st round vote	# of 2nd round votes	% of 2nd round vote	Seats
2014	European	77,136	0.41%	No second round		0 / 74
2015	Regional	189,350	0.87%	__	__	0 / 1,914
2017	Legislative	148,734	0.67%	__	__	0 / 577
2019	European	265,469	1.17%	No second round		0 / 79
2024	European	253,036	1.02%	No second round		0 / 81

== See also ==
- Category:Popular Republican Union (2007) politicians
- Politics of France
- List of political parties in France
