= Philippe Poutou =

French politician (born 1967)

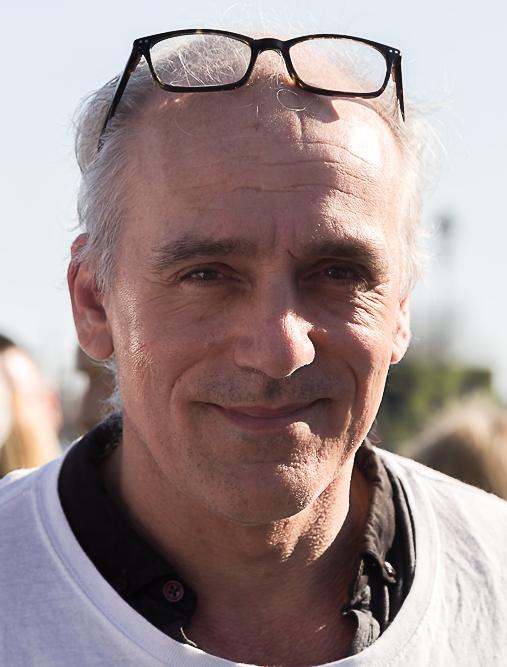
- Poutou in 2019

Municipal Councillor of Bordeaux
- In office 28 June 2020 – 27 March 2026

Metropolitan Councillor of Bordeaux Métropole
- In office 28 June 2020 – 27 March 2026

Personal details
- Born: 14 March 1967 (age 59) Villemomble, Île-de-France, France
- Party: New Anticapitalist Party (2009–present)
- Other political affiliations: Lutte Ouvrière (1985–1997); Voix des Travailleurs (1997–2000); Revolutionary Communist League (2000–2009)
- Occupation: Trade unionist, car factory worker, politician
- Known for: French presidential candidate (2012, 2017, 2022)

Philippe Poutou ([filip putu]; born 14 March 1967) is a French far-left politician, bookseller, former trade unionist and car factory worker who has been municipal councillor of Bordeaux and metropolitan councillor of Bordeaux Métropole since 2020.

A member of the New Anticapitalist Party, he was a candidate in the presidential elections of 2012, 2017 and 2022, in which he respectively received 1.15%, 1.09% and 0.76% of the vote.

== Trade union activity ==
Poutou was secretary of the General Confederation of Labour at the Ford Motor Company in the Aquitaine region of France. He was a car industry worker until his factory closed in 2019. In 2007, he played a leading role in union negotiations with the company over the potential axing of 2,000 jobs; he was a union spokesman to the media.

On 9 April 2025, Poutou opened an independent bookstore in Bordeaux with his partner.

== Early political activity ==
Poutou was a candidate for the Revolutionary Communist League in the 2007 legislative election. He stood in the 5th constituency of Gironde, where he gathered 1,582 votes (2.7%) and placed eighth, as the party failed to win a seat in the National Assembly. He then led its successor party, the New Anticapitalist Party, in the 2010 regional election in his home region of Aquitaine. He failed to be elected a regional councillor as the list he led obtained 2.5% of the vote. Poutou stood again in the 2012 legislative election in which he gathered 1,264 votes (2.12%) and placed eighth a second time. In the 2014 European Parliament election, he led the New Anticapitalist Party list in South-West France but failed to be elected an MEP.

== Election campaigns ==
=== 2012 campaign for president ===
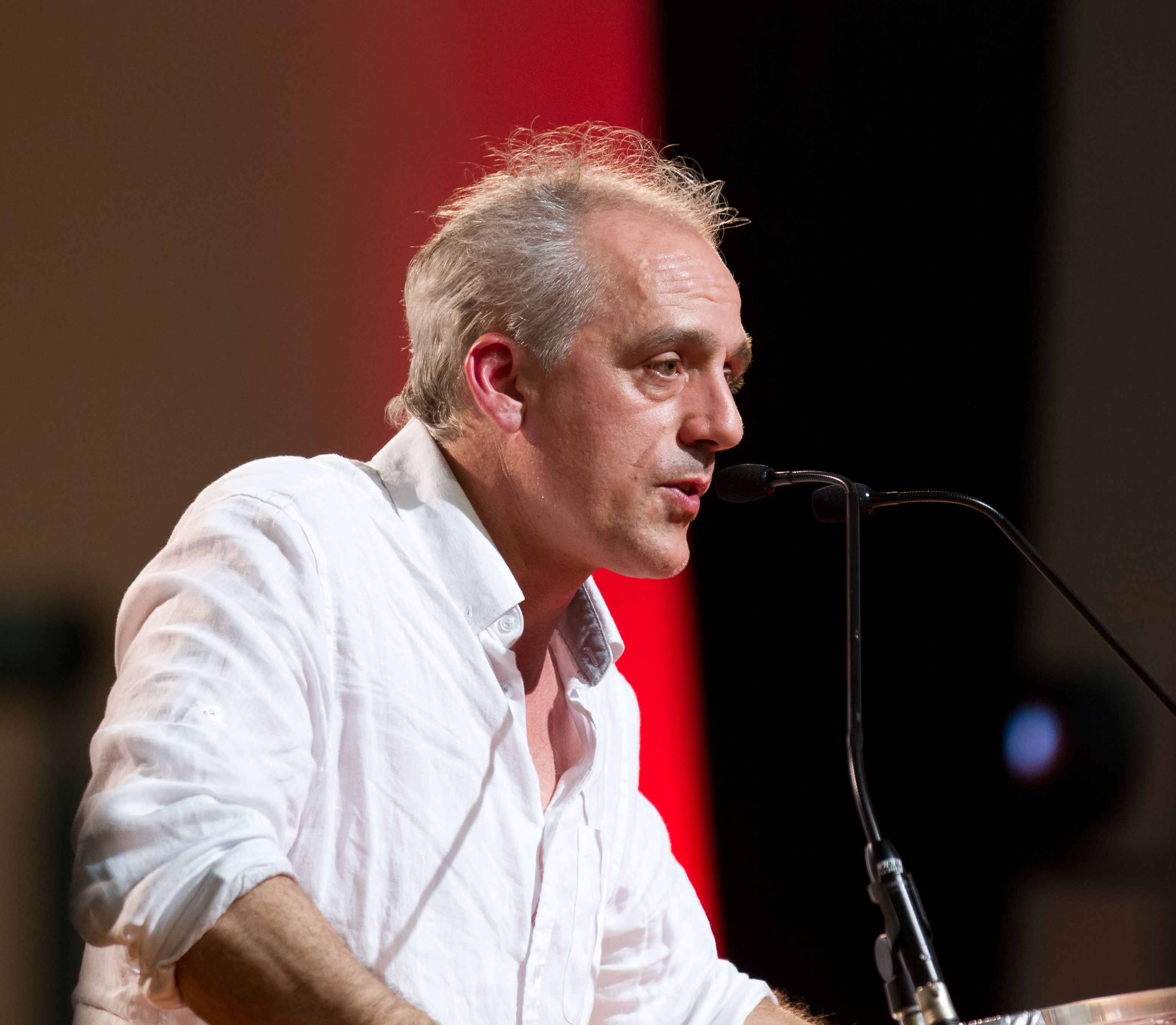
Poutou campaigning for the presidency in March 2012 in Toulouse

In June 2011, he was chosen by the New Anticapitalist Party as its candidate for the 2012 presidential election. Media noted that he was virtually unknown to the public, as well as that he might find it difficult to succeed previous candidate Olivier Besancenot, a well recognised figure popular beyond the party itself. He would, in addition, have to contend with divisions within the party over whether to engage more with the Left Front, with an aim to unify the political forces on the left of the centre-left Socialist Party.

For much of the campaign, he remained little known to the general public; he was described as lacking Besancenot's popularity, charisma and ease with words. Freely admitting that he did not particularly want to be a candidate and that he did not aim to be elected, particularly as one of his policies was to abolish the presidency, in favour of a fully parliamentary system, he saw his profile and popularity increase somewhat in the late stages of the campaign, when all candidates confirmed by the Constitutional Council obtained equal airtime in the media as required by law. In particular, his unconventional behaviour drew attention during the television programme Des paroles et des actes hosted by David Pujadas on France 2, along with his unusual campaign clips – such as one based on the film The Artist, or another parodying the gameshow Questions pour un champion and playing on the fact that Poutou remained little-known to the public.

Like Trotskyist candidate Nathalie Arthaud of Lutte Ouvrière, his message was that improvements in workers' rights would come through workers' struggles and demands rather than through the ballot box. Obtaining 1.15% of the vote, finishing eighth out of ten, Poutou called upon voters to "vote against Sarkozy" in the second round. The press partly explained his low result by the fact that Jean-Luc Mélenchon, of the Left Front, had attracted the bulk of voters on the "left of the left". Poutou explained that, while he hoped Hollande would win rather than Sarkozy, the New Anticapitalist Party would have to help build an "opposition on the left" to the new government.

=== 2017 campaign for president ===
On 20 March 2016, Poutou was nominated by the New Anticapitalist Party as its candidate in the 2017 presidential election. In a televised debate on 4 April 2017, he denounced "corrupt politicians" and advocated for lower salaries for elected officials. His remarks earned him the applause of fellow candidate Jean-Luc Mélenchon of La France Insoumise. Poutou attacked François Fillon and Marine Le Pen, the first of which warned he could sue for the corruption claims that were made. Furthermore, Poutou addressed the moderators stating "it's not because I don't have a tie that you have to interrupt me". For several media observers, Poutou was the most prominent debate partaker. In the election, he received 1.09% of the vote and placed eighth out of eleven, as Mélenchon, the best-placed left-wing candidate in fourth place, had gathered over 3 million additional votes compared to 2012.

=== 2022 campaign for president ===
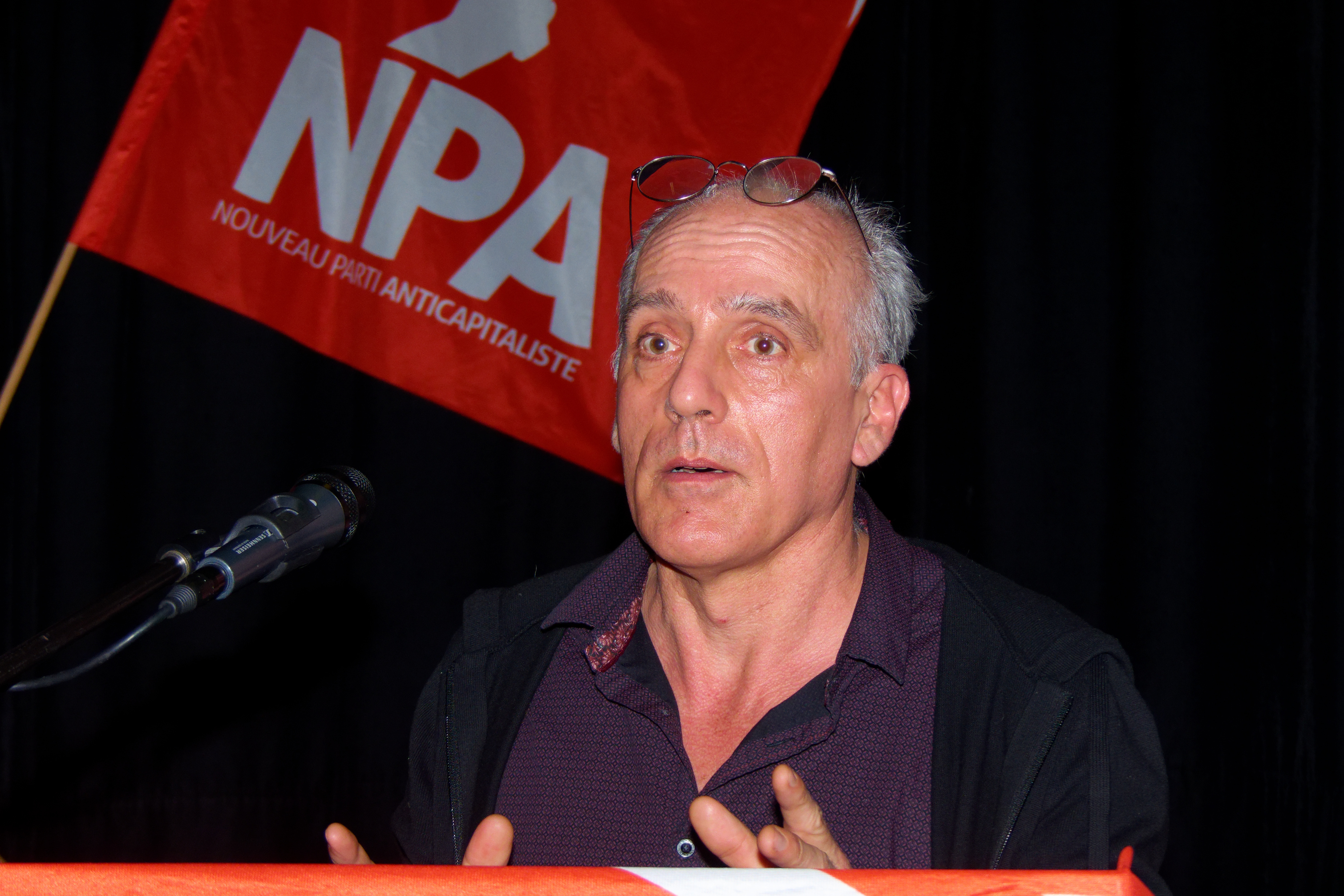
Poutou speaking in Audincourt in February 2022

Poutou supported and took part in the yellow vests movement that started in 2018, within the larger protests against Emmanuel Macron, stating it was "the expression of a fed up with a society that is deeply unjust". On 28 June 2020, he took office as a municipal councillor and metropolitan councillor of Bordeaux, following the 2020 municipal election, in which he campaigned most notably for free public transportation. Previous attempts to win a seat in the municipal council as lead candidate in 2001 and 2014 were unsuccessful.

Despite initial statements he would not run in 2022, Poutou was invested a third time by his party ahead of the 2022 presidential election. He stated he had "many things to say" to incumbent President Emmanuel Macron.

In the first round of the 2022 presidential election, Poutou received 268,904 votes, 0.76% of the total vote. Ahead of the 2022 legislative election, Poutou announced his party would not take part in the New People's Ecologist and Social Union (NUPES) headed by Mélenchon. He was notably critical of the Socialist Party's weight in the alliance.

=== 2024 campaign for the National Assembly ===
Ahead of the snap 2024 legislative election, the NPA came to agreement with La France Insoumise, the Socialist Party, and other left-wing and ecologist forces to create a joint list for the election, called the New Popular Front (NFP). Poutou himself was invested as the NFP's candidate in Aude's 1st constituency. He reached the second round, but was defeated by RN incumbent Christophe Barthès.

In May 2025, Poutou and his partner Béatrice Walylo took over the Les 400 Coups book store in Bordeaux. He announced that he would not be a candidate in the 2027 presidential election.
