= Opinion polling for the 2017 French presidential election =

This page lists public opinion polls conducted for the 2017 French presidential election, which was held on 23 April 2017 with a run-off on 7 May 2017.

Unless otherwise noted, all polls listed below are compliant with the regulations of the national polling commission (Commission nationale des sondages) and utilize the quota method.

== First round ==
Ifop-Fiducial and OpinionWay polls listed in the tables below starting in February 2017 are "rolling" polls unless otherwise denoted by an asterisk (*). The poll by Belgian pollster Dedicated Research commissioned by La Libre Belgique and RTBF and published on 20 February 2017, marked with two asterisks (**) in the table below, was not subject to French regulations.

Polls marked with three asterisks (***) from Scan Research/Le Terrain use CATI and random number dialing, unlike all other pollsters, which conduct online surveys using the quota method. The polling commission published notices for each of the two polls conducted by Scan Research/Le Terrain.

Alain Juppé, who lost the primary of the right and centre to Fillon, was floated to replace him as a result of the Fillon affair (Penelopegate). Though tested in some hypothetical polls, Juppé announced on 6 March that he would not be a candidate, regardless of what happened with Fillon.

=== Graphical summary ===
The averages in the graphs below were constructed using polls listed below conducted by the eight major French pollsters. The graphs are smoothed 14-day weighted moving averages, using only the most recent poll conducted by any given pollster within that range (each poll weighted based on recency).

François Bayrou of the Democratic Movement (MoDem) renounced a potential candidacy on 22 February 2017 and instead proposed an alliance with Emmanuel Macron, which he accepted. Yannick Jadot of Europe Ecology – The Greens (EELV) announced that he would withdraw his candidacy and endorsed Benoît Hamon on 23 February after negotiating a common platform with the Socialist nominee; the agreement was approved by the EELV primary voters on 26 February.

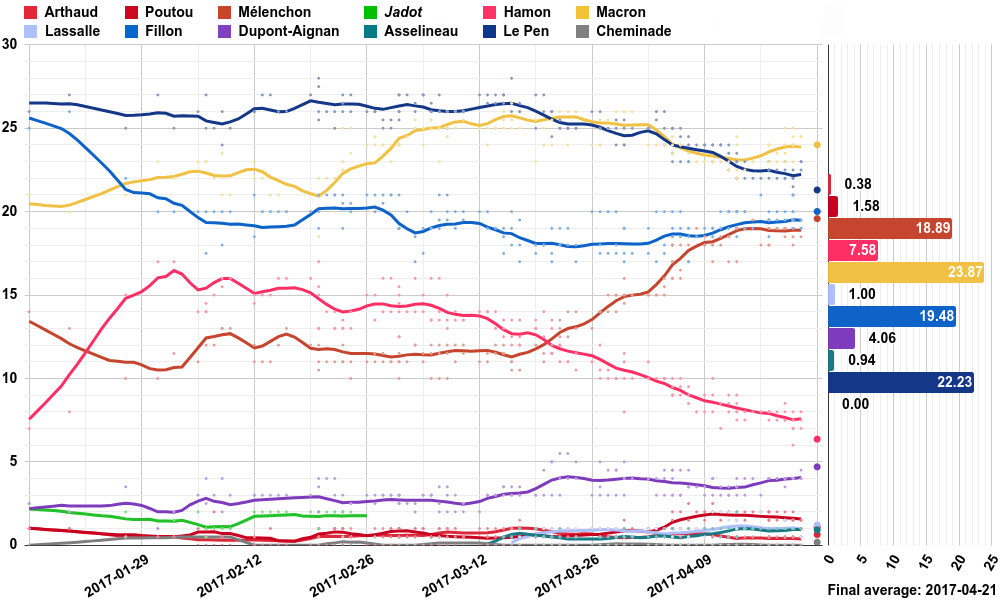

=== Official campaign ===
This table below lists polls completed since the publication of the official list of candidates on 18 March until the first round vote on 23 April 2017. The publication of first-round polls was prohibited after midnight on 21 April 2017.

Polling firm	Fieldwork date	Sample size	Abs.	Arthaud LO	Poutou NPA	Mélenchon FI	Hamon PS	Macron EM	Lassalle Résistons!	Fillon LR	Dupont-Aignan DLF	Asselineau UPR	Le Pen FN	Cheminade S&P
2017 election	23 Apr 2017	–	22.23%	0.64%	1.09%	19.58%	6.36%	24.01%	1.21%	20.01%	4.70%	0.92%	21.30%	0.18%
Odoxa	21 Apr 2017	666	–	0%	1%	19%	7.5%	24.5%	0.5%	19%	4.5%	1%	23%	0%
BVA	20–21 Apr 2017	1,134	20%	0.5%	1.5%	19.5%	8%	23%	1%	19%	4%	0.5%	23%	<0.5%
Ifop-Fiducial	18–21 Apr 2017	2,823	27%	0.5%	1.5%	18.5%	7%	24.5%	1%	19.5%	4%	1%	22.5%	<0.5%
Odoxa	20 Apr 2017	1,433	–	0.5%	1.5%	19.5%	6%	25%	1%	19.5%	4%	1%	22%	0%
Elabe	19–20 Apr 2017	1,445	29%	0.5%	1.5%	19.5%	7%	24%	1%	20%	4%	1%	21.5%	<0.5%
Ipsos	19–20 Apr 2017	1,401	27%	0.5%	1.5%	19%	7.5%	24%	1.5%	19%	4%	1%	22%	<0.5%
Harris Interactive	18–20 Apr 2017	962	–	0.5%	1.5%	19%	7.5%	24.5%	1%	20%	4%	1%	21%	<0.5%
OpinionWay	18–20 Apr 2017	2,269	–	0%	2%	18%	8%	23%	1%	21%	4%	1%	22%	0%
Ifop-Fiducial	17–20 Apr 2017	2,810	27%	0.5%	1.5%	18.5%	7%	24%	1.5%	19.5%	4%	1%	22.5%	<0.5%
BVA	18–19 Apr 2017	1,098	20%	0.5%	1.5%	19%	8.5%	24%	0.5%	19%	3.5%	0.5%	23%	<0.5%
Harris Interactive	18–19 Apr 2017	2,812	–	0.5%	1.5%	19%	7.5%	25%	1%	19%	4%	0.5%	22%	<0.5%
OpinionWay	17–19 Apr 2017	2,394	–	0%	2%	19%	8%	23%	1%	20%	4%	1%	22%	0%
Ifop-Fiducial	16–19 Apr 2017	2,792	28%	0.5%	1.5%	18.5%	7.5%	23.5%	1.5%	19.5%	4%	1%	22.5%	<0.5%
OpinionWay	16–18 Apr 2017	2,417	–	0%	2%	19%	8%	23%	1%	20%	4%	1%	22%	0%
Ifop-Fiducial	14–18 Apr 2017	2,804	29%	0.5%	1.5%	19%	7.5%	23.5%	1%	19.5%	4%	1%	22.5%	<0.5%
Elabe	16–17 Apr 2017	1,438	32%	0.5%	2%	18%	8%	24%	0.5%	19.5%	4%	0.5%	23%	<0.5%
Ipsos	16–17 Apr 2017	8,274	28%	0.5%	1.5%	19%	8%	23%	1%	19.5%	4%	1%	22.5%	<0.5%
OpinionWay	15–17 Apr 2017	2,423	–	0%	2%	19%	8%	23%	1%	20%	4%	1%	22%	0%
Kantar Sofres	14–17 Apr 2017	1,178	22%	0.5%	2%	18%	8%	24%	1%	18.5%	4%	1%	23%	<0.5%
Ifop-Fiducial	13–17 Apr 2017	2,796	30%	0.5%	1.5%	19.5%	7.5%	23%	1%	19.5%	4%	1%	22.5%	<0.5%
OpinionWay	14–16 Apr 2017	2,168	–	1%	2%	18%	8%	22%	2%	21%	3%	1%	22%	0%
Ifop-Fiducial*	14–15 Apr 2017	1,851	30%	0.5%	2%	19.5%	8%	23%	1%	19%	4%	1%	22%	<0.5%
Le Terrain***	13–15 Apr 2017	642	–	1%	1.5%	22%	8%	24%	0.5%	17.5%	3.5%	0.5%	21.5%	0%
BVA	12–14 Apr 2017	1,044	23%	1%	1.5%	20%	7.5%	23%	1%	20%	3%	1%	22%	<0.5%
Ifop-Fiducial	11–14 Apr 2017	2,776	31%	0.5%	2%	19%	8%	22.5%	1%	19%	4%	1%	23%	<0.5%
Ipsos	12–13 Apr 2017	927	34%	0.5%	2%	20%	7.5%	22%	1.5%	19%	3.5%	1.5%	22%	0.5%
Odoxa	12–13 Apr 2017	754	–	0%	1.5%	19%	8%	24.5%	1.5%	18.5%	3.5%	0.5%	23%	0%
Harris Interactive	11–13 Apr 2017	904	–	<0.5%	1%	19%	8%	24%	1%	20%	4%	1%	22%	<0.5%
OpinionWay	11–13 Apr 2017	1,443	–	0%	2%	17%	9%	22%	2%	20%	3%	2%	23%	0%
Ifop-Fiducial	10–13 Apr 2017	2,797	31%	0.5%	2%	19%	8.5%	22.5%	1%	19%	3.5%	0.5%	23.5%	<0.5%
Elabe	11–12 Apr 2017	1,010	37%	0.5%	2%	18.5%	9%	23.5%	0.5%	20%	3%	0.5%	22.5%	<0.5%
OpinionWay	10–12 Apr 2017	1,423	–	0%	2%	17%	8%	23%	2%	20%	3%	1%	24%	0%
Ifop-Fiducial	9–12 Apr 2017	2,800	32%	0.5%	2%	18.5%	8.5%	22.5%	1.5%	19%	3.5%	0.5%	23.5%	<0.5%
OpinionWay	9–11 Apr 2017	1,395	–	0%	2%	18%	7%	23%	2%	20%	3%	1%	24%	0%
Ifop-Fiducial	7–11 Apr 2017	2,806	32%	0.5%	1.5%	18.5%	8.5%	23%	1%	19%	3.5%	0.5%	24%	<0.5%
Elabe	9–10 Apr 2017	1,002	37%	0.5%	2.5%	17%	10%	23%	0.5%	19%	4%	0.5%	23%	<0.5%
OpinionWay	8–10 Apr 2017	1,498	–	0%	2%	18%	8%	23%	2%	19%	3%	1%	24%	0%
Ifop-Fiducial	6–10 Apr 2017	2,616	33%	0.5%	2%	18%	9%	23%	1%	18.5%	4%	<0.5%	24%	<0.5%
Ipsos	7–9 Apr 2017	1,002	34%	1%	1.5%	18.5%	8%	24%	0.5%	18%	3.5%	1%	24%	<0.5%
OpinionWay	7–9 Apr 2017	1,565	–	0%	2%	18%	9%	23%	1%	19%	3%	1%	24%	0%
Ifop-Fiducial*	7–8 Apr 2017	1,845	32%	1%	2%	19%	8%	23%	1%	18.5%	3.5%	<0.5%	24%	<0.5%
BVA	5–7 Apr 2017	1,006	23%	1%	1.5%	19%	8.5%	23%	1%	19%	3.5%	0.5%	23%	<0.5%
Kantar Sofres	5–7 Apr 2017	1,075	28%	0.5%	2.5%	18%	9%	24%	0.5%	17%	3.5%	1%	24%	<0.5%
Ifop-Fiducial	4–7 Apr 2017	2,246	35%	0.5%	1%	17%	9.5%	23.5%	1%	18.5%	4.5%	<0.5%	24.5%	<0.5%
Harris Interactive	5–6 Apr 2017	928	–	1%	1%	18%	9%	24%	1%	19%	3%	1%	23%	<0.5%
OpinionWay	4–6 Apr 2017	1,589	–	0%	2%	16%	10%	24%	0%	20%	3%	0%	25%	0%
Ifop-Fiducial	3–6 Apr 2017	2,243	35%	0.5%	1%	16.5%	9.5%	24%	1%	18.5%	4.5%	<0.5%	24.5%	<0.5%
Elabe	5 Apr 2017	995	36%	1%	1.5%	17%	9%	23.5%	1%	19%	4.5%	<0.5%	23.5%	<0.5%
Harris Interactive	5 Apr 2017	2,097	–	1%	1%	17%	9%	25%	1%	18%	3%	1%	24%	<0.5%
Odoxa	5 Apr 2017	799	–	0.5%	2%	18%	9%	23.5%	0.5%	18.5%	4%	1%	23%	0%
OpinionWay	3–5 Apr 2017	1,553	–	0%	1%	16%	10%	24%	0%	20%	3%	1%	25%	0%
Ifop-Fiducial	2–5 Apr 2017	2,245	35%	0.5%	1%	16%	9.5%	24.5%	1%	18%	4.5%	<0.5%	25%	<0.5%
Harris Interactive	3–4 Apr 2017	3,639	–	1%	<0.5%	16%	10%	26%	<0.5%	18%	4%	1%	24%	<0.5%
OpinionWay	2–4 Apr 2017	1,541	–	0%	1%	15%	10%	24%	0%	20%	3%	1%	26%	0%
Ifop-Fiducial	31 Mar–4 Apr 2017	2,254	34%	0.5%	0.5%	15.5%	10%	25%	1%	17.5%	4.5%	0.5%	25%	<0.5%
OpinionWay	1–3 Apr 2017	1,583	–	0%	1%	15%	10%	24%	1%	20%	3%	0%	26%	0%
Ifop-Fiducial	30 Mar–3 Apr 2017	2,232	34%	0.5%	0.5%	15%	10%	26%	1%	17%	4%	0.5%	25.5%	<0.5%
Ipsos	31 Mar–2 Apr 2017	9,460	34%	1%	1%	15%	10%	25%	1%	17.5%	4%	0.5%	25%	<0.5%
OpinionWay	31 Mar–2 Apr 2017	1,624	–	0%	1%	15%	11%	24%	1%	19%	4%	0%	25%	0%
Ifop-Fiducial	28–31 Mar 2017	2,204	35%	0.5%	1%	15%	10%	26%	0.5%	17.5%	4%	0.5%	25%	<0.5%
BVA	29–30 Mar 2017	1,010	24%	1%	0.5%	15%	11.5%	25%	0.5%	19%	3%	0.5%	24%	<0.5%
Odoxa	29–30 Mar 2017	787	–	0%	1.5%	16%	8%	26%	1%	17%	5%	0.5%	25%	0%
OpinionWay	28–30 Mar 2017	1,609	–	0%	1%	15%	11%	24%	1%	19%	4%	1%	24%	0%
Ifop-Fiducial	27–30 Mar 2017	2,215	36%	0.5%	1%	14.5%	10%	26%	1%	17.5%	4%	<0.5%	25.5%	<0.5%
Elabe	28–29 Mar 2017	998	41%	0.5%	0.5%	15%	10%	25.5%	1%	18%	4.5%	0.5%	24%	0.5%
OpinionWay	27–29 Mar 2017	1,636	–	0%	1%	15%	10%	25%	1%	20%	3%	0%	25%	0%
Ifop-Fiducial	26–29 Mar 2017	2,241	37%	0.5%	0.5%	14%	10%	26%	1%	17.5%	4.5%	0.5%	25.5%	<0.5%
OpinionWay	26–28 Mar 2017	1,618	–	0%	1%	15%	10%	25%	1%	20%	3%	0%	25%	0%
Ifop-Fiducial	24–28 Mar 2017	2,231	38%	1%	0.5%	14%	10.5%	25.5%	1%	17.5%	4.5%	0.5%	25%	<0.5%
Ipsos	25–27 Mar 2017	1,005	35%	1%	1%	14%	12%	24%	1%	18%	3.5%	0.5%	25%	<0.5%
OpinionWay	25–27 Mar 2017	1,599	–	1%	1%	14%	10%	24%	1%	20%	3%	0%	26%	0%
Ifop-Fiducial	23–27 Mar 2017	2,235	38%	1%	0.5%	14%	10.5%	25.5%	0.5%	17.5%	5%	0.5%	25%	<0.5%
Le Terrain***	23–27 Mar 2017	586	–	0.8%	2%	19.5%	9%	24.5%	0.3%	15.5%	4%	0.2%	24%	0.2%
OpinionWay	24–26 Mar 2017	1,676	–	1%	1%	13%	11%	24%	1%	20%	3%	0%	26%	0%
BVA	22–24 Mar 2017	1,020	24%	0.5%	0.5%	14%	11.5%	26%	1%	17%	4%	0.5%	25%	<0.5%
Ifop-Fiducial	21–24 Mar 2017	2,225	37%	0.5%	0.5%	13%	10.5%	26%	1%	18%	5%	0.5%	25%	<0.5%
OpinionWay	21–23 Mar 2017	1,675	–	1%	1%	14%	11%	24%	1%	19%	4%	0%	25%	0%
Ifop-Fiducial	20–23 Mar 2017	2,245	36.5%	0.5%	0.5%	12.5%	11%	26%	1%	18%	5.5%	<0.5%	25%	<0.5%
Harris Interactive	21–22 Mar 2017	6,383	–	<0.5%	<0.5%	13.5%	12.5%	26%	1%	18%	4%	<0.5%	25%	<0.5%
OpinionWay	20–22 Mar 2017	1,672	–	1%	0%	13%	12%	25%	1%	19%	3%	1%	25%	0%
Ifop-Fiducial	19–22 Mar 2017	1,974	36.5%	0.5%	0.5%	12%	11%	25.5%	1%	18%	5.5%	0.5%	25.5%	<0.5%
Elabe	21 Mar 2017	997	38%	0.5%	0.5%	13.5%	11.5%	26%	1%	17%	5%	0.5%	24.5%	<0.5%
OpinionWay	19–21 Mar 2017	1,676	–	1%	1%	12%	13%	24%	1%	19%	3%	0%	26%	0%
Ifop-Fiducial	18–21 Mar 2017	1,695	37%	1%	0.5%	11.5%	11.5%	25.5%	1%	17.5%	5%	0.5%	26%	<0.5%
Ifop-Fiducial	18–20 Mar 2017	935	37.5%	1%	0.5%	11.5%	12.5%	25%	0.5%	18%	4.5%	0.5%	26%	<0.5%
OpinionWay	18–20 Mar 2017	1,667	–	1%	1%	11%	14%	24%	1%	18%	3%	0%	27%	0%
Elabe	17–19 Mar 2017	2,847	41%	0.5%	0.5%	13%	13.5%	25.5%	1%	17.5%	3%	0.5%	25%	<0.5%
OpinionWay	17–19 Mar 2017	1,593	–	1%	1%	12%	13%	23%	1%	18%	3%	1%	27%	0%

=== 26 January to 16 March 2017 ===
Polling firm	Fieldwork date	Sample size	Abs.	Arthaud LO	Poutou NPA	Mélenchon FI	Jadot EELV	Hamon PS	Macron EM	Bayrou MoDem	Lassalle Résistons!	Fillon LR	Juppé LR	Dupont-Aignan DLF	Asselineau UPR	Le Pen FN	Cheminade S&P
BVA	15–17 Mar 2017	935	27%	1%	<0.5%	12%	–	12.5%	25%	–	–	19.5%	–	3%	1%	26%	–
Kantar Sofres	15–17 Mar 2017	1,062	27%	1.5%	1%	12%	–	12%	26%	–	0.5%	17%	–	3%	1%	26%	<0.5%
Ifop-Fiducial	14–17 Mar 2017	1,376	37.5%	1%	0.5%	10.5%	–	13.5%	26%	–	–	18%	–	3.5%	0.5%	26.5%	<0.5%
Odoxa	15–16 Mar 2017	672	–	1%	1%	10.5%	–	12.5%	26.5%	–	0%	19%	–	3%	0.5%	26%	0%
OpinionWay	14–16 Mar 2017	1,571	–	1%	0%	11%	–	12%	25%	–	–	20%	–	3%	–	28%	–
Ifop-Fiducial	13–16 Mar 2017	1,386	37%	1%	0.5%	11%	–	13.5%	25.5%	–	–	18%	–	3.5%	0.5%	26.5%	<0.5%
Ipsos	14–15 Mar 2017	8,205	34%	1%	0.5%	11.5%	–	12.5%	26%	–	–	17.5%	–	3.5%	0.5%	27%	<0.5%
OpinionWay	13–15 Mar 2017	1,554	–	1%	0%	12%	–	13%	25%	–	–	19%	–	3%	–	27%	–
Ifop-Fiducial	12–15 Mar 2017	1,399	36.5%	0.5%	0.5%	11.5%	–	13.5%	25.5%	–	–	18.5%	–	3.5%	<0.5%	26.5%	<0.5%
OpinionWay	12–14 Mar 2017	1,529	–	1%	0%	12%	–	13%	25%	–	–	19%	–	3%	–	27%	–
Ifop-Fiducial	10–14 Mar 2017	1,413	36%	0.5%	0.5%	11.5%	–	14%	25%	–	–	19%	–	3%	<0.5%	26.5%	<0.5%
OpinionWay	11–13 Mar 2017	1,528	–	1%	0%	11%	–	14%	24%	–	–	20%	–	3%	–	27%	–
Future Thinking	10–13 Mar 2017	811	–	0.5%	1%	10.5%	–	14%	23.5%	–	–	20%	–	3%	–	27%	0.5%
Ifop-Fiducial	9–13 Mar 2017	1,397	37%	0.5%	0.5%	11.5%	–	14%	25%	–	–	19%	–	3%	<0.5%	26.5%	<0.5%
OpinionWay	10–12 Mar 2017	1,610	–	1%	0%	11%	–	14%	25%	–	–	20%	–	2%	–	27%	–
BVA	8–10 Mar 2017	950	26%	0.5%	0.5%	11.5%	–	13.5%	26%	–	–	20%	–	2%	–	26%	–
Ifop-Fiducial	7–10 Mar 2017	1,379	36.5%	0.5%	0.5%	12%	–	13.5%	25.5%	–	–	19.5%	–	2.5%	–	26%	<0.5%
OpinionWay	7–9 Mar 2017	1,571	–	1%	0%	11%	–	14%	26%	–	–	20%	–	2%	–	26%	–
Ifop-Fiducial	6–9 Mar 2017	1,395	36.5%	1%	0.5%	12%	–	13.5%	25%	–	–	19%	–	3%	–	26%	<0.5%
Harris Interactive	6–8 Mar 2017	4,533	–	1%	<0.5%	12%	–	13%	26%	–	–	20%	–	3%	–	25%	–
OpinionWay	6–8 Mar 2017	1,509	–	1%	0%	10%	–	15%	25%	–	–	21%	–	2%	–	26%	–
Ifop-Fiducial	5–8 Mar 2017	1,394	36%	1%	0.5%	11.5%	–	13.5%	24.5%	–	–	19.5%	–	3.5%	–	26%	<0.5%
Ipsos	6–7 Mar 2017	644	–	1%	1%	12%	–	13.5%	23%	–	–	19.5%	–	2.5%	–	27%	0.5%
OpinionWay	5–7 Mar 2017	1,574	–	0%	0%	10%	–	16%	25%	–	–	21%	–	2%	–	26%	–
Ifop-Fiducial	3–7 Mar 2017	1,390	36%	0.5%	0.5%	11.5%	–	14%	25%	–	–	19%	–	3.5%	–	26%	<0.5%
Elabe	5–6 Mar 2017	1,000	41%	0.5%	0.5%	12%	–	13.5%	25.5%	–	–	19%	–	3%	–	26%	–
OpinionWay	4–6 Mar 2017	1,559	–	0%	0%	10%	–	16%	25%	–	–	20%	–	3%	–	26%	–
Ifop-Fiducial	2–6 Mar 2017	1,381	35.5%	0.5%	0.5%	11.5%	–	13.5%	25.5%	–	–	19%	–	3%	–	26.5%	<0.5%
OpinionWay	3–5 Mar 2017	1,671	–	0%	1%	11%	–	15%	24%	–	–	19%	–	3%	–	27%	–
Ipsos	1–5 Mar 2017	10,854	34%	1%	1%	11.5%	–	14%	25%	–	–	17.5%	–	3%	–	27%	<0.5%
Ifop-Fiducial*	2–4 Mar 2017	1,822	35%	0.5%	0.5%	12%	–	14%	25.5%	–	–	18.5%	–	2.5%	–	26.5%	<0.5%
Ifop-Fiducial*	2–4 Mar 2017	1,822	35%	0.5%	0.5%	11.5%	–	13%	23%	–	–	–	20%	3%	–	28.5%	<0.5%
Kantar Sofres	2–4 Mar 2017	700	31%	1%	1%	12%	–	16%	25%	–	–	17%	–	2%	–	26%	<0.5%
Kantar Sofres	2–4 Mar 2017	700	31%	1%	1%	11%	–	13%	20%	–	–	–	24.5%	2.5%	–	27%	<0.5%
Ifop-Fiducial	28 Feb–3 Mar 2017	1,383	35%	0.5%	0.5%	11%	–	14%	24.5%	–	–	20%	–	2.5%	–	27%	<0.5%
Odoxa	1–2 Mar 2017	907	–	0.5%	1%	10%	–	14%	27%	–	–	19%	–	3%	–	25.5%	–
Odoxa	1–2 Mar 2017	907	–	0.5%	1%	8%	–	11%	25%	–	–	–	26.5%	4%	–	24%	–
BVA	28 Feb–2 Mar 2017	924	28%	0.5%	1%	11.5%	–	15.5%	24%	–	–	19%	–	2.5%	–	26%	–
Elabe	28 Feb–2 Mar 2017	1,507	41%	1%	1%	12.5%	–	12.5%	24%	–	–	19%	–	3%	–	27%	–
OpinionWay	28 Feb–2 Mar 2017	1,654	–	0%	1%	11%	–	15%	24%	–	–	19%	–	3%	–	27%	–
Ifop-Fiducial	27 Feb–2 Mar 2017	1,394	37%	0.5%	0.5%	11%	–	14.5%	24%	–	–	21%	–	2.5%	–	26%	<0.5%
OpinionWay	27 Feb–1 Mar 2017	1,639	–	0%	1%	11%	–	16%	23%	–	–	21%	–	3%	–	25%	–
Ifop-Fiducial	26 Feb–1 Mar 2017	1,392	37.5%	1%	0.5%	11%	–	14%	24%	–	–	21%	–	3%	–	25.5%	<0.5%
OpinionWay	26–28 Feb 2017	1,629	–	0%	0%	11%	–	16%	24%	–	–	21%	–	3%	–	25%	–
Ifop-Fiducial	24–28 Feb 2017	1,398	37%	1%	0.5%	11.5%	–	14%	24%	–	–	20.5%	–	3%	–	25.5%	<0.5%
OpinionWay	25–27 Feb 2017	1,624	–	0%	0%	11%	–	15%	24%	–	–	21%	–	3%	–	26%	–
Ifop-Fiducial	23–27 Feb 2017	1,404	38%	1%	0.5%	11.5%	–	13.5%	24.5%	–	–	20%	–	2.5%	–	26%	0.5%
OpinionWay	24–26 Feb 2017	1,631	–	0%	0%	11%	–	15%	24%	–	–	21%	–	3%	–	26%	–
Kantar Sofres	23–24 Feb 2017	700	30%	1%	0.5%	10%	–	14%	25%	–	–	20%	–	2.5%	–	27%	<0.5%
Ifop-Fiducial	21–24 Feb 2017	1,417	39%	0.5%	0.5%	11%	2%	13%	23.5%	–	–	20.5%	–	2.5%	–	26%	0.5%
Odoxa	22–23 Feb 2017	884	–	0%	1%	12%	1%	13%	25%	–	–	19%	–	2%	–	27%	–
OpinionWay	21–23 Feb 2017	1,431	–	0%	1%	11%	2%	13%	23%	–	–	21%	–	3%	–	26%	–
Ifop-Fiducial	20–23 Feb 2017	1,395	39%	0.5%	1%	11%	2%	13.5%	22.5%	–	–	20.5%	–	2%	–	26.5%	0.5%
Harris Interactive	20–22 Feb 2017	5,249	–	1%	1%	13%	2%	14%	20%	–	–	21%	–	3%	–	25%	–
OpinionWay	20–22 Feb 2017	1,615	–	0%	1%	11%	2%	13%	22%	–	–	21%	–	4%	–	26%	–
Ifop-Fiducial	19–22 Feb 2017	1,399	38%	0.5%	1%	11%	1.5%	14%	19%	5.5%	–	19%	–	2%	–	26.5%	<0.5%
OpinionWay	19–21 Feb 2017	1,545	–	0%	0%	11%	2%	14%	22%	–	–	21%	–	4%	–	26%	–
Ifop-Fiducial	17–21 Feb 2017	1,386	38%	0.5%	1%	11.5%	1.5%	14%	19%	5.5%	–	19%	–	2%	–	26%	<0.5%
BVA	19–20 Feb 2017	628	26%	0.5%	0.5%	10.5%	2%	17%	21%	–	–	19%	–	2%	–	27.5%	–
Elabe	18–20 Feb 2017	995	43%	1%	1%	13%	1%	13%	18.5%	–	–	21%	–	3.5%	–	28%	–
Elabe	18–20 Feb 2017	995	43%	1%	1%	12%	1%	12%	17%	6%	–	20%	–	3%	–	27%	–
OpinionWay	18–20 Feb 2017	1,535	–	0%	1%	11%	1%	15%	21%	–	–	21%	–	4%	–	26%	–
Ifop-Fiducial*	17–20 Feb 2017	1,838	–	0.5%	0.5%	12%	2%	15.5%	22%	–	–	20%	–	2%	–	25.5%	<0.5%
Ifop-Fiducial	16–20 Feb 2017	1,397	38%	0.5%	1%	11.5%	1.5%	14%	19%	5.5%	–	18.5%	–	2.5%	–	26%	<0.5%
OpinionWay	17–19 Feb 2017	1,534	–	0%	0%	12%	2%	16%	20%	–	–	20%	–	3%	–	27%	–
Ifop-Fiducial	14–17 Feb 2017	1,399	38%	0.5%	0.5%	11.5%	2%	14%	18.5%	5.5%	–	18.5%	–	3%	–	26%	<0.5%
OpinionWay	14–16 Feb 2017	1,605	–	0%	0%	13%	2%	16%	20%	–	–	20%	–	3%	–	26%	–
Ifop-Fiducial	13–16 Feb 2017	1,396	37%	0.5%	0.5%	11%	2%	14%	19.5%	5%	–	18.5%	–	3%	–	26%	<0.5%
OpinionWay	13–15 Feb 2017	1,602	–	0%	0%	12%	2%	16%	21%	–	–	20%	–	3%	–	26%	–
Ifop-Fiducial	12–15 Feb 2017	1,394	37%	0.5%	0.5%	11.5%	1.5%	14%	19.5%	5%	–	18.5%	–	3%	–	26%	<0.5%
OpinionWay	12–14 Feb 2017	1,456	–	0%	1%	11%	2%	15%	21%	–	–	20%	–	3%	–	27%	–
Dedicated Research**	10–14 Feb 2017	1,552	–	1.4%	0.7%	13.1%	2.3%	17.0%	23.0%	–	–	17.8%	–	2.2%	–	22.6%	–
Dedicated Research**	10–14 Feb 2017	1,576	–	1.4%	0.6%	12.7%	2.1%	16.4%	21.3%	4.9%	–	16.7%	–	1.9%	–	22.1%	–
Ifop-Fiducial	10–14 Feb 2017	1,402	37%	0.5%	0.5%	11.5%	1.5%	14.5%	19.5%	5%	–	18.5%	–	3%	–	25.5%	<0.5%
OpinionWay	11–13 Feb 2017	1,422	–	0%	0%	11%	2%	15%	22%	–	–	20%	–	3%	–	27%	–
Ifop-Fiducial	9–13 Feb 2017	1,392	38%	0.5%	0.5%	11.5%	1.5%	14.5%	19.5%	5.5%	–	18%	–	2.5%	–	26%	<0.5%
OpinionWay	10–12 Feb 2017	1,590	–	0%	0%	11%	2%	15%	22%	–	–	21%	–	3%	–	26%	–
Ipsos	7–12 Feb 2017	11,020	–	0.5%	0.5%	12%	2%	14.5%	23%	–	–	18.5%	–	3%	–	26%	<0.5%
Ipsos	7–12 Feb 2017	11,020	–	0.5%	0.5%	11.5%	2%	14%	20%	6%	–	17.5%	–	3%	–	25%	<0.5%
Ifop-Fiducial	7–10 Feb 2017	1,396	38.5%	0.5%	<0.5%	11%	1.5%	15%	20.5%	5.5%	–	17.5%	–	2.5%	–	26%	<0.5%
OpinionWay	7–9 Feb 2017	1,496	–	0%	1%	13%	1%	16%	21%	–	–	20%	–	3%	–	25%	–
Ifop-Fiducial	6–9 Feb 2017	1,407	38.5%	0.5%	<0.5%	10.5%	1.5%	15%	21%	5.5%	–	17.5%	–	2.5%	–	26%	<0.5%
Elabe	7–8 Feb 2017	961	36%	0.5%	0.5%	13%	1%	15.5%	23.5%	–	–	18%	–	2%	–	26%	–
Elabe	7–8 Feb 2017	961	36%	0.5%	0.5%	12%	1%	15%	22%	5%	–	17%	–	1.5%	–	25.5%	–
Harris Interactive	6–8 Feb 2017	5,432	–	<0.5%	1%	12%	2%	14%	21%	5%	–	19%	–	2%	–	24%	–
OpinionWay	6–8 Feb 2017	1,454	–	0%	1%	13%	1%	16%	21%	–	–	20%	–	4%	–	24%	–
Ifop-Fiducial	5–8 Feb 2017	1,409	38%	0.5%	0.5%	10.5%	1.5%	14.5%	21%	5.5%	–	18%	–	2%	–	26%	<0.5%
OpinionWay	5–7 Feb 2017	1,487	–	0%	2%	12%	1%	15%	22%	–	–	20%	–	3%	–	25%	–
Ifop-Fiducial	3–7 Feb 2017	1,424	38.5%	0.5%	1%	10.5%	1%	14.5%	21%	5%	–	18.5%	–	2%	–	26%	<0.5%
Elabe	4–6 Feb 2017	993	–	0.5%	0.5%	14%	0.5%	14.5%	23%	–	–	17.5%	–	2.5%	–	27%	–
Elabe	4–6 Feb 2017	993	–	0.5%	0.5%	13%	0.5%	14%	22%	4%	–	17%	–	2%	–	26.5%	–
OpinionWay	4–6 Feb 2017	1,568	–	0%	1%	12%	1%	14%	23%	–	–	20%	–	4%	–	25%	–
Ifop-Fiducial	2–6 Feb 2017	1,433	39.5%	0.5%	1%	10%	1%	15.5%	20.5%	5%	–	18.5%	–	2.5%	–	25.5%	<0.5%
OpinionWay	3–5 Feb 2017	1,700	–	0%	1%	11%	2%	14%	23%	–	–	20%	–	3%	–	26%	–
Ifop-Fiducial	31 Jan–3 Feb 2017	1,430	39.5%	0.5%	1%	10%	1%	16.5%	20.5%	4.5%	–	18.5%	–	2.5%	–	25%	<0.5%
BVA	1–2 Feb 2017	640	25%	0.5%	0.5%	11.5%	1.5%	17%	22%	–	–	20%	–	2%	–	25%	–
BVA	1–2 Feb 2017	646	25%	0.5%	0.5%	11%	1%	16%	21%	5%	–	18%	–	2%	–	25%	–
Ifop-Fiducial	30 Jan–2 Feb 2017	1,414	38%	0.5%	1%	9.5%	1%	17%	20%	4%	–	20%	–	2.5%	–	24.5%	<0.5%
Ifop-Fiducial	29 Jan–1 Feb 2017	1,409	37%	<0.5%	0.5%	9%	1%	18%	20%	4.5%	–	21%	–	2%	–	24%	<0.5%
Elabe	30–31 Jan 2017	993	39%	0.5%	0.5%	10%	1%	17%	23%	–	–	20%	–	1%	–	27%	–
Elabe	30–31 Jan 2017	993	39%	0.5%	0.5%	10%	1%	16%	22%	4%	–	19%	–	1%	–	26%	–
Kantar Sofres	26–27 Jan 2017	700	29%	0.5%	0.5%	10%	2%	15%	21%	–	–	22%	–	3.5%	–	25%	0.5%
Kantar Sofres	26–27 Jan 2017	700	29%	0.5%	0.5%	10%	2%	13%	20%	5%	–	21%	–	3%	–	25%	<0.5%

With additional sponsorship-collecting candidates

Polling firm	Fieldwork date	Sample size	Arthaud LO	Poutou NPA	Mélenchon FI	Larrouturou ND	Marchandise LP	Hamon PS	Macron EM	Lassalle Résistons!	Yade LFQO	Fillon LR	Alliot-Marie NF	Guaino DVD	Dupont-Aignan DLF	Asselineau UPR	Le Pen FN	Cheminade S&P
Ifop-Fiducial	1–4 Mar 2017	1,392	1%	0.5%	10.5%	<0.5%	0.5%	14%	23%	1%	1%	20%	1%	<0.5%	2.5%	<0.5%	25%	<0.5%

=== 25 November 2016 to 25 January 2017 ===
Polling firm	Fieldwork date	Sample size	Abs.	Arthaud LO	Poutou NPA	Mélenchon FI	Jadot EELV	Hollande PS	Valls PS	Montebourg PS	Hamon PS	Peillon PS	Pinel PRG	Macron EM	Bayrou MoDem	Fillon LR	Dupont-Aignan DLF	Le Pen FN	Cheminade S&P
Ipsos	20 Jan 2017	992	–	1%	1%	15%	2%	–	9%	–	–	–	–	18%	–	25%	2%	27%	<0.5%
Ipsos	20 Jan 2017	992	–	1%	1%	14%	2%	–	–	7%	–	–	–	20%	–	26%	2%	27%	<0.5%
Ipsos	20 Jan 2017	992	–	1%	1%	13%	2%	–	–	–	8%	–	–	20%	–	26%	2%	27%	<0.5%
Ipsos	10–15 Jan 2017	10,986	–	1%	1%	15%	2.5%	–	10%	–	–	–	–	19%	–	24%	2.5%	25%	<0.5%
Ipsos	10–15 Jan 2017	10,986	–	1%	1%	14%	2.5%	–	9%	–	–	–	–	17%	5%	23%	2.5%	25%	<0.5%
Ipsos	10–15 Jan 2017	10,986	–	1%	1%	14%	2.5%	–	–	7%	–	–	–	21%	–	25%	2.5%	26%	<0.5%
Ipsos	10–15 Jan 2017	10,986	–	1%	1%	13%	2.5%	–	–	6%	–	–	–	19%	5%	24%	2.5%	26%	<0.5%
Ipsos	10–15 Jan 2017	10,986	–	1%	1%	14%	2.5%	–	–	–	7%	–	–	21%	–	25%	2.5%	26%	<0.5%
BVA	6–8 Jan 2017	644	24%	1%	1%	13%	2.5%	–	11%	–	–	–	–	16%	5%	24%	1.5%	25%	–
BVA	6–8 Jan 2017	638	24%	1.5%	1%	12.5%	3%	–	–	6.5%	–	–	–	20%	5%	24%	1.5%	25%	–
BVA	6–8 Jan 2017	637	24%	1%	0.5%	12.5%	2.5%	–	–	–	6%	–	–	20%	6%	24%	1.5%	26%	–
BVA	6–8 Jan 2017	629	24%	1%	1%	13%	2.5%	–	–	–	–	5%	–	20%	6%	24%	1.5%	26%	–
Ifop-Fiducial	3–6 Jan 2017	1,860	–	0.5%	1%	12%	2%	–	10.5%	–	–	–	–	17%	5.5%	24%	1.5%	26%	<0.5%
Ifop-Fiducial	3–6 Jan 2017	1,860	–	1%	1%	11.5%	2%	–	–	5.5%	–	–	–	19%	7%	24.5%	2%	26.5%	<0.5%
Ifop-Fiducial	3–6 Jan 2017	1,860	–	1%	1%	11.5%	2%	–	–	–	6%	–	–	19%	7%	24.5%	1.5%	26%	0.5%
Ifop-Fiducial	3–6 Jan 2017	1,860	–	1%	1.5%	13%	2.5%	–	–	–	–	2.5%	–	20%	7%	25%	1.5%	26%	<0.5%
Elabe	3–4 Jan 2017	925	41%	1%	2%	14%	1.5%	–	13%	–	–	–	–	18%	–	26%	1.5%	23%	–
Elabe	3–4 Jan 2017	925	41%	1%	2.5%	14%	1%	–	12%	–	–	–	–	16%	7.5%	23%	1%	22%	–
Elabe	3–4 Jan 2017	925	41%	0.5%	2%	14%	1.5%	–	–	9%	–	–	–	24%	–	26%	1%	22%	–
Elabe	3–4 Jan 2017	925	41%	1%	2%	13%	1%	–	–	7%	–	–	–	20%	7%	24%	2%	23%	–
Elabe	3–4 Jan 2017	925	41%	1.5%	1.5%	14.5%	1.5%	–	–	–	6%	–	–	23%	–	26%	2%	24%	–
Elabe	3–4 Jan 2017	925	41%	0.5%	2%	13%	1%	–	–	–	6%	–	–	21%	8%	24%	1.5%	23%	–
Elabe	3–4 Jan 2017	925	41%	1%	2%	15%	1.5%	–	–	–	–	3%	–	24%	–	28%	1.5%	24%	–
Elabe	3–4 Jan 2017	925	41%	0.5%	2%	14%	1%	–	–	–	–	3%	–	22%	7%	25%	1.5%	24%	–
Ipsos	2–7 Dec 2016	12,724	–	1%	1%	14%	2.5%	–	12%	–	–	–	<0.5%	15%	–	27%	2.5%	25%	<0.5%
Ipsos	2–7 Dec 2016	12,724	–	1%	1%	13%	2.5%	–	11%	–	–	–	<0.5%	13%	6%	26%	2.5%	24%	<0.5%
Ipsos	2–7 Dec 2016	12,724	–	1%	1%	14%	2.5%	–	–	7%	–	–	<0.5%	18%	–	29%	2.5%	25%	<0.5%
Ipsos	2–7 Dec 2016	12,724	–	1%	1%	13%	2.5%	–	–	6%	–	–	<0.5%	16%	7%	27%	2.5%	24%	<0.5%
BVA	2–4 Dec 2016	934	28%	0.5%	0.5%	14%	2%	–	13%	–	–	–	0.5%	14%	6%	24%	1.5%	24%	–
BVA	2–4 Dec 2016	934	28%	0.5%	1%	17%	2.5%	–	21%	–	–	–	0.5%	–	–	29%	2.5%	26%	–
BVA	2–4 Dec 2016	934	28%	1%	1%	13%	2%	–	–	6.5%	–	–	0.5%	19%	8%	23%	2%	24%	–
Ifop-Fiducial	2–3 Dec 2016	1,401	–	0.5%	1%	12.5%	2%	–	10%	–	–	–	<0.5%	13.5%	7%	27.5%	2%	24%	–
Ifop-Fiducial	2–3 Dec 2016	1,401	–	0.5%	1%	12.5%	1.5%	–	–	6%	–	–	0.5%	16%	8%	28%	2%	24%	–
Ifop-Fiducial	2–3 Dec 2016	1,401	–	1%	1%	13.5%	1.5%	–	–	–	4%	–	<0.5%	16%	9%	28%	2%	24%	–
Ifop-Fiducial	28–30 Nov 2016	1,882	–	1%	1%	11%	2%	–	10%	–	–	–	0.5%	15%	5.5%	28%	2%	24%	–
Ifop-Fiducial	28–30 Nov 2016	1,882	–	0.5%	1%	11.5%	1.5%	–	–	6%	–	–	1%	17%	6%	29%	2.5%	24%	–
Elabe	28–29 Nov 2016	941	41%	0.5%	1%	12%	1.5%	7%	–	–	–	–	–	16%	6%	30%	2%	24%	–
Elabe	28–29 Nov 2016	941	41%	0.5%	1%	12%	1.5%	–	9%	–	–	–	–	14%	5%	31%	2%	24%	–
Elabe	28–29 Nov 2016	941	41%	0.5%	1%	12%	1.5%	–	–	5%	–	–	–	17%	5%	31%	2%	25%	–
Kantar Sofres	28 Nov 2016	1,011	25%	0.5%	1%	13%	2%	8.5%	–	–	–	–	1%	17%	–	30%	2.5%	24%	0.5%
Kantar Sofres	28 Nov 2016	1,011	25%	0.5%	1%	12%	2%	7.5%	–	–	–	–	1%	15%	6%	29%	2.5%	23%	0.5%
Kantar Sofres	28 Nov 2016	1,011	25%	2%	1.5%	15%	3%	14%	–	–	–	–	1%	–	–	34%	3%	26%	0.5%
Kantar Sofres	28 Nov 2016	1,011	25%	1.5%	1%	11.5%	2.5%	–	11%	–	–	–	0.5%	15%	–	29%	2.5%	25%	0.5%
Kantar Sofres	28 Nov 2016	1,011	25%	1.5%	1%	12%	2%	–	9.5%	–	–	–	0.5%	13%	6%	28%	2%	24%	0.5%
Kantar Sofres	28 Nov 2016	1,011	25%	1%	1%	12.5%	2%	–	–	7%	–	–	1%	17.5%	–	31%	2.5%	24%	0.5%
Kantar Sofres	28 Nov 2016	1,011	25%	1%	1%	12%	1.5%	–	–	6%	–	–	1%	16%	6%	29%	2%	24%	0.5%
Harris Interactive	27 Nov 2016	6,093	–	1%	1%	13%	3%	9%	–	–	–	–	–	14%	6%	26%	3%	24%	–
Harris Interactive	27 Nov 2016	6,093	–	1%	1%	15%	2%	–	9%	–	–	–	–	13%	7%	26%	2%	24%	–
Odoxa	25 Nov 2016	844	–	2%	1%	12%	2%	8%	–	–	–	–	–	13%	6%	32%	2%	22%	–

=== 8 July to 24 November 2016 ===
Polling firm	Fieldwork date	Sample size	Abs.	Arthaud LO	Poutou NPA	Mélenchon FI	Duflot EELV	Jadot EELV	Hollande PS	Valls PS	Montebourg PS	Macron EM	Bayrou MoDem	Juppé LR	Sarkozy LR	Fillon LR	Le Maire LR	NKM LR	Copé LR	Dupont-Aignan DLF	Le Pen FN	Cheminade S&P
Ifop-Fiducial	16–17 Nov 2016	979	–	0.5%	1.5%	13%	–	2.5%	9%	–	–	14%	–	26%	–	–	–	–	–	3%	30%	0.5%
Ifop-Fiducial	16–17 Nov 2016	979	–	1%	1.5%	13%	–	2.5%	9%	–	–	16%	8.5%	–	17.5%	–	–	–	–	3%	28%	<0.5%
Ifop-Fiducial	16–17 Nov 2016	979	–	1%	1.5%	13%	–	3%	10%	–	–	15%	5.5%	–	–	20%	–	–	–	2%	29%	<0.5%
Ipsos	8–13 Nov 2016	12,378	–	1.5%	1.5%	14%	–	4%	10%	–	–	–	–	36%	–	–	–	–	–	4%	29%	<0.5%
Ipsos	8–13 Nov 2016	12,378	–	1.5%	1.5%	14%	–	4%	12%	–	–	–	12%	–	22%	–	–	–	–	4%	29%	<0.5%
Ipsos	8–13 Nov 2016	12,378	–	1.5%	1.5%	14%	–	4%	–	12%	–	–	–	34%	–	–	–	–	–	4%	29%	<0.5%
Ipsos	8–13 Nov 2016	12,378	–	1.5%	1.5%	14%	–	4%	–	14%	–	–	11%	–	21%	–	–	–	–	4%	29%	<0.5%
Ipsos	8–13 Nov 2016	12,378	–	1.5%	1.5%	13%	–	3%	9%	–	–	10%	–	31%	–	–	–	–	–	4%	27%	<0.5%
Kantar Sofres	21–23 Oct 2016	1,005	25%	1%	2%	14.5%	–	2%	12%	–	–	–	–	34%	–	–	–	–	–	5%	29%	0.5%
Kantar Sofres	21–23 Oct 2016	1,005	25%	1.5%	1.5%	15.5%	–	2%	13%	–	–	–	11.5%	–	22%	–	–	–	–	4.5%	28%	0.5%
Kantar Sofres	21–23 Oct 2016	1,005	25%	0.5%	2%	13%	–	1.5%	9%	–	–	14%	–	28%	–	–	–	–	–	4%	28%	<0.5%
Kantar Sofres	21–23 Oct 2016	1,005	25%	0.5%	1.5%	13.5%	–	1.5%	10%	–	–	15%	8%	–	20%	–	–	–	–	4%	26%	<0.5%
Kantar Sofres	21–23 Oct 2016	1,005	25%	1%	2%	14%	–	2%	11%	–	–	18%	–	–	21%	–	–	–	–	4%	27%	<0.5%
Kantar Sofres	21–23 Oct 2016	1,005	25%	1.5%	2%	15%	–	2%	–	13%	–	–	–	33%	–	–	–	–	–	4%	29%	0.5%
Kantar Sofres	21–23 Oct 2016	1,005	25%	1.5%	1.5%	13%	–	1.5%	–	9%	–	14%	–	28%	–	–	–	–	–	3%	28%	0.5%
Ifop-Fiducial	17–20 Oct 2016	1,827	–	1%	1.5%	14%	2%	–	14%	–	–	–	–	35%	–	–	–	–	–	5%	27%	0.5%
Ifop-Fiducial	17–20 Oct 2016	1,827	–	0.5%	1.5%	14.5%	2.5%	–	15%	–	–	–	12.5%	–	23%	–	–	–	–	5%	25%	0.5%
Ifop-Fiducial	17–20 Oct 2016	1,827	–	1%	1.5%	14.5%	2.5%	–	15%	–	–	–	11.5%	–	–	20%	–	–	–	5%	29%	<0.5%
Ifop-Fiducial	17–20 Oct 2016	1,827	–	1%	1.5%	15%	2%	–	16%	–	–	–	12.5%	–	–	–	19%	–	–	4.5%	28.5%	<0.5%
Ifop-Fiducial	17–20 Oct 2016	1,827	–	0.5%	1.5%	15.5%	2%	–	15%	–	–	–	14%	–	–	–	–	15%	–	6%	30%	0.5%
Ifop-Fiducial	17–20 Oct 2016	1,827	–	0.5%	1.5%	15.5%	3%	–	16%	–	–	–	15%	–	–	–	–	–	11%	6%	31%	0.5%
Ifop-Fiducial	17–20 Oct 2016	1,827	–	1%	1.5%	14.5%	2%	–	–	13.5%	–	–	–	36%	–	–	–	–	–	4%	27.5%	<0.5%
Ifop-Fiducial	17–20 Oct 2016	1,827	–	0.5%	1%	14%	2.5%	–	–	9%	–	12%	–	31%	–	–	–	–	–	5%	24.5%	0.5%
Ifop-Fiducial	17–20 Oct 2016	1,827	–	1%	1%	14%	2.5%	–	–	–	5.5%	15%	–	32%	–	–	–	–	–	4%	24.5%	0.5%
Ifop-Fiducial	17–20 Oct 2016	1,827	–	1%	1%	13.5%	3%	–	–	–	6%	18%	9%	–	20.5%	–	–	–	–	4%	23.5%	0.5%
BVA	14–16 Oct 2016	916	27%	1%	2%	12.5%	2.5%	–	11%	–	–	–	–	37%	–	–	–	–	–	5%	29%	–
BVA	14–16 Oct 2016	916	27%	1%	1.5%	14%	3%	–	13%	–	–	–	14%	–	22%	–	–	–	–	4%	27.5%	–
BVA	14–16 Oct 2016	916	27%	1%	2%	12%	2%	–	9%	–	–	11%	–	33%	–	–	–	–	–	4%	26%	–
BVA	14–16 Oct 2016	916	27%	1%	2%	12%	2.5%	–	9.5%	–	–	14%	10%	–	20%	–	–	–	–	4%	25%	–
BVA	14–16 Oct 2016	916	27%	1%	2%	13%	2%	–	–	–	9%	–	–	39%	–	–	–	–	–	5%	29%	–
BVA	14–16 Oct 2016	916	27%	1%	1%	15%	3%	–	–	–	10%	–	15%	–	22%	–	–	–	–	5%	28%	–
Ifop for DLF	26–28 Sep 2016	932	–	1.5%	–	12%	2.5%	–	12%	–	–	12%	–	27%	–	–	–	–	–	5%	28%	–
Elabe	20–21 Sep 2016	922	44%	1%	1%	15%	3%	–	15%	–	–	–	–	34%	–	–	–	–	–	3%	28%	–
Elabe	20–21 Sep 2016	922	44%	1%	1%	14%	3%	–	16%	–	–	–	12%	–	23%	–	–	–	–	3%	27%	–
Elabe	20–21 Sep 2016	922	44%	1%	1%	13%	3%	–	12%	–	–	14%	–	26%	–	–	–	–	–	3%	27%	–
Elabe	20–21 Sep 2016	922	44%	0.5%	0.5%	15%	2.5%	–	12.5%	–	–	15%	8%	–	18%	–	–	–	–	3%	25%	–
Elabe	20–21 Sep 2016	922	44%	1%	1%	14%	2.5%	–	–	9%	–	14%	–	28%	–	–	–	–	–	3.5%	27%	–
Elabe	20–21 Sep 2016	922	44%	1%	1%	15%	2%	–	–	9%	–	15%	10%	–	18%	–	–	–	–	3%	26%	–
Elabe	20–21 Sep 2016	922	44%	1%	1.5%	14%	2%	–	–	–	7%	16%	–	29.5%	–	–	–	–	–	2%	27%	–
Elabe	20–21 Sep 2016	922	44%	0.5%	1%	14%	2%	–	–	–	7%	18%	9%	–	19%	–	–	–	–	3%	26.5%	–
Ipsos	9–18 Sep 2016	12,469	–	1.5%	1.5%	12.5%	3%	–	12.5%	–	–	–	–	34%	–	–	–	–	–	5%	30%	<0.5%
Ipsos	9–18 Sep 2016	12,469	–	1.5%	1.5%	13%	3%	–	13%	–	–	–	12%	–	22%	–	–	–	–	5%	29%	<0.5%
Ipsos	9–18 Sep 2016	12,469	–	1.5%	1.5%	11.5%	2.5%	–	10%	–	–	12%	–	28%	–	–	–	–	–	5%	28%	<0.5%
Ipsos	9–18 Sep 2016	12,469	–	1.5%	1.5%	11.5%	2.5%	–	10%	–	–	14%	9%	–	18%	–	–	–	–	5%	27%	<0.5%
BVA	9–11 Sep 2016	912	30%	1%	1%	12%	3%	–	11%	–	–	–	–	36%	–	–	–	–	–	6%	30%	–
BVA	9–11 Sep 2016	912	30%	0.5%	1%	12.5%	3.5%	–	13%	–	–	–	13%	–	22%	–	–	–	–	5%	29.5%	–
BVA	9–11 Sep 2016	912	30%	1%	1%	13%	3%	–	13%	–	–	–	12%	–	–	18.5%	–	–	–	5.5%	33%	–
BVA	9–11 Sep 2016	912	30%	1%	1%	13%	3.5%	–	14%	–	–	–	12.5%	–	–	–	16%	–	–	7%	32%	–
BVA	9–11 Sep 2016	912	30%	1%	0.5%	10%	3%	–	9%	–	–	16.5%	–	26%	–	–	–	–	–	6%	28%	–
BVA	9–11 Sep 2016	912	30%	1%	1%	11%	3%	–	9%	–	–	18.5%	7%	–	19%	–	–	–	–	5%	25.5%	–
BVA	9–11 Sep 2016	912	30%	0.5%	1.5%	12%	2%	–	–	–	9%	–	–	38%	–	–	–	–	–	7%	30%	–
BVA	9–11 Sep 2016	912	30%	1%	0.5%	13.5%	2.5%	–	–	–	9%	–	14%	–	24%	–	–	–	–	6.5%	29%	–
Ifop-Fiducial	5–7 Sep 2016	1,903	–	1%	1.5%	13.5%	3%	–	14%	–	–	–	–	33%	–	–	–	–	–	5%	29%	<0.5%
Ifop-Fiducial	5–7 Sep 2016	1,903	–	1%	1.5%	14%	3%	–	14.5%	–	–	–	13%	–	22%	–	–	–	–	5%	26%	<0.5%
Ifop-Fiducial	5–7 Sep 2016	1,903	–	1%	1.5%	14.5%	3%	–	15.5%	–	–	–	12%	–	–	–	17%	–	–	5%	30%	0.5%
Ifop-Fiducial	5–7 Sep 2016	1,903	–	1%	1.5%	12.5%	2.5%	–	10%	–	–	15%	–	27%	–	–	–	–	–	4%	26%	0.5%
Ifop-Fiducial	5–7 Sep 2016	1,903	–	1%	1.5%	11%	2.5%	–	10%	–	3.5%	14%	–	26%	–	–	–	–	–	4%	26%	0.5%
Ifop-Fiducial	5–7 Sep 2016	1,903	–	1%	1.5%	11%	2.5%	–	10%	–	4%	15%	9%	–	18%	–	–	–	–	4%	24%	<0.5%
Ifop-Fiducial	5–7 Sep 2016	1,903	–	1%	1%	13.5%	3%	–	–	8%	–	16%	–	27%	–	–	–	–	–	4%	26%	0.5%
Ifop-Fiducial	5–7 Sep 2016	1,903	–	1%	1%	11.5%	3%	–	–	7%	5%	14%	–	27%	–	–	–	–	–	4%	26%	0.5%
TNS Sofres	2–5 Sep 2016	1,006	25%	1.5%	1.5%	12%	3%	–	14%	–	–	–	–	33%	–	–	–	–	–	6%	29%	<0.5%
TNS Sofres	2–5 Sep 2016	1,006	25%	1%	2%	12%	2%	–	13%	–	–	–	13%	–	25%	–	–	–	–	5%	27%	<0.5%
TNS Sofres	2–5 Sep 2016	1,006	25%	1.5%	2.5%	13%	4.5%	–	15%	–	–	–	–	–	27%	–	–	–	–	7%	29%	0.5%
TNS Sofres	2–5 Sep 2016	1,006	25%	1%	1.5%	11.5%	3%	–	11%	–	–	15%	–	25%	–	–	–	–	–	3.5%	28.5%	<0.5%
TNS Sofres	2–5 Sep 2016	1,006	25%	1%	1%	11%	2%	–	11%	–	–	16%	9%	–	20%	–	–	–	–	3%	26%	<0.5%
TNS Sofres	2–5 Sep 2016	1,006	25%	1%	1%	12%	3%	–	12%	–	–	18%	–	–	22%	–	–	–	–	4%	27%	<0.5%
TNS Sofres	2–5 Sep 2016	1,006	25%	1.5%	2%	11%	3.5%	–	–	–	6%	16%	–	27%	–	–	–	–	–	5%	27.5%	0.5%
TNS Sofres	2–5 Sep 2016	1,006	25%	1.5%	1%	10%	3%	–	–	–	5%	18%	8%	–	22%	–	–	–	–	4%	27%	0.5%
TNS Sofres	2–5 Sep 2016	1,006	25%	2%	2%	11%	4%	–	–	–	7%	20%	–	–	22%	–	–	–	–	4%	27%	1%
BVA	8–10 Jul 2016	936	31%	1%	1.5%	13.5%	2%	–	13.5%	–	–	–	–	36%	–	–	–	–	–	4.5%	28%	–
BVA	8–10 Jul 2016	936	31%	1%	1%	13%	2%	–	13%	–	–	–	13%	–	23%	–	–	–	–	5%	29%	–

=== 14 January to 7 July 2016 ===
Polling firm	Fieldwork date	Sample size	Abs.	Arthaud LO	Poutou NPA	Mélenchon FI	Duflot EELV	Hulot SE	Hollande PS	Valls PS	Montebourg PS	Macron PS	Bayrou MoDem	Juppé LR	Sarkozy LR	Fillon LR	Le Maire LR	Dupont-Aignan DLF	Asselineau UPR	Le Pen FN	Cheminade S&P
Elabe	20–21 Jun 2016	926	48%	1%	1%	11%	3%	–	14%	–	–	–	–	39%	–	–	–	5%	–	26%	–
Elabe	20–21 Jun 2016	926	48%	0.5%	1%	12%	3.5%	–	15%	–	–	–	11.5%	–	25%	–	–	4.5%	–	27%	–
Elabe	20–21 Jun 2016	926	48%	1%	1%	12%	3%	–	15%	–	–	–	10%	–	–	24%	–	5%	–	29%	–
Elabe	20–21 Jun 2016	926	48%	0.5%	1%	11%	3.5%	–	15%	–	–	–	12%	–	–	–	22%	5%	–	30%	–
Elabe	20–21 Jun 2016	926	48%	1%	1%	10%	–	9%	12%	–	–	–	–	37%	–	–	–	4%	–	26%	–
Elabe	20–21 Jun 2016	926	48%	0.5%	1%	10%	–	10%	14%	–	–	–	10%	–	25%	–	–	3.5%	–	26%	–
Elabe	20–21 Jun 2016	926	48%	1%	1%	11%	–	10%	13%	–	–	–	9.5%	–	–	23%	–	4.5%	–	27%	–
Elabe	20–21 Jun 2016	926	48%	1%	1.5%	10%	–	11%	13.5%	–	–	–	10%	–	–	–	21%	4%	–	28%	–
Ifop-Fiducial	14–17 Jun 2016	1,858	–	0.5%	1.5%	12.5%	2.5%	–	14%	–	–	–	–	35%	–	–	–	4.5%	–	29%	0.5%
Ifop-Fiducial	14–17 Jun 2016	1,858	–	1%	1.5%	13%	2%	–	15%	–	–	–	12.5%	–	22%	–	–	4.5%	–	28%	0.5%
Ifop-Fiducial	14–17 Jun 2016	1,858	–	0.5%	1.5%	14.5%	2.5%	–	15%	–	–	–	12%	–	–	18%	–	5.5%	–	30%	0.5%
Ifop-Fiducial	14–17 Jun 2016	1,858	–	0.5%	1%	14%	2.5%	–	16%	–	–	–	12.5%	–	–	–	17%	5.5%	–	30.5%	0.5%
Ifop-Fiducial	14–17 Jun 2016	1,858	–	0.5%	1%	11.5%	2%	–	14%	–	4.5%	–	–	34%	–	–	–	4.5%	–	28%	<0.5%
Ifop-Fiducial	14–17 Jun 2016	1,858	–	1%	1%	12.5%	–	5.5%	13%	–	–	–	–	34%	–	–	–	4.5%	–	28%	0.5%
Ifop-Fiducial	14–17 Jun 2016	1,858	–	1%	1.5%	12%	2%	–	–	–	5%	12%	–	33%	–	–	–	4.5%	–	28.5%	0.5%
Ifop-Fiducial	14–17 Jun 2016	1,858	–	1%	–	14%	–	–	15%	–	–	–	–	36%	–	–	–	5%	1%	28%	–
BVA	10–12 Jun 2016	910	33%	1.5%	1.5%	14%	2%	–	14%	–	–	–	–	36%	–	–	–	5%	–	26%	–
BVA	10–12 Jun 2016	910	33%	2%	1%	14%	3%	–	13%	–	–	–	13%	–	21%	–	–	5%	–	28%	–
BVA	10–12 Jun 2016	910	33%	1.5%	1.5%	15%	2%	–	14%	–	–	–	12%	–	–	19%	–	6%	–	29%	–
BVA	10–12 Jun 2016	910	33%	2%	1%	15%	2%	–	15%	–	–	–	12%	–	–	–	19%	5%	–	29%	–
Ipsos	13–22 May 2016	12,710	–	1.5%	1.5%	12%	3%	–	14%	–	–	–	–	35%	–	–	–	5%	–	28%	<0.5%
Ipsos	13–22 May 2016	12,710	–	1.5%	1.5%	12%	3%	–	14%	–	–	–	13%	–	21%	–	–	6%	–	28%	<0.5%
BVA	13–16 May 2016	927	31%	0.5%	1.5%	12%	4%	–	13.5%	–	–	–	–	38%	–	–	–	5.5%	–	25%	–
BVA	13–16 May 2016	927	31%	0.5%	1.5%	12%	3.5%	–	15%	–	–	–	13.5%	–	22%	–	–	5%	–	27%	–
BVA	13–16 May 2016	927	31%	0.5%	1.5%	13%	3.5%	–	15%	–	–	–	14%	–	–	21%	–	4.5%	–	27%	–
BVA	13–16 May 2016	927	31%	0.5%	2%	13%	3.5%	–	16%	–	–	–	16%	–	–	–	17%	5%	–	27%	–
Ifop-Fiducial	25–28 Apr 2016	1,419	–	1.5%	1%	14%	2.5%	–	–	–	–	20%	–	29%	–	–	–	6%	–	26%	<0.5%
Ifop-Fiducial	25–28 Apr 2016	1,419	–	1%	1%	13%	3%	–	–	–	–	22%	10%	–	18%	–	–	6%	–	26%	<0.5%
Elabe	26–27 Apr 2016	911	42%	1%	1%	11%	2%	–	15%	–	–	–	–	39%	–	–	–	5%	–	26%	–
Elabe	26–27 Apr 2016	911	42%	1%	1%	10%	2%	–	18%	–	–	–	14%	–	23%	–	–	5%	–	26%	–
Elabe	26–27 Apr 2016	911	42%	1%	1%	11.5%	2%	–	–	15.5%	–	–	–	38%	–	–	–	5%	–	26%	–
Elabe	26–27 Apr 2016	911	42%	1%	1%	12%	2%	–	–	18.5%	–	–	13%	–	22%	–	–	5.5%	–	25%	–
Elabe	26–27 Apr 2016	911	42%	1.5%	2%	12%	2%	–	–	19%	–	–	12%	–	–	19%	–	4%	–	28.5%	–
Elabe	26–27 Apr 2016	911	42%	1%	1%	12%	2%	–	–	–	–	21%	–	36%	–	–	–	4%	–	23%	–
Elabe	26–27 Apr 2016	911	42%	1.5%	2%	12%	2.5%	–	–	–	–	25%	11%	–	18%	–	–	4%	–	24%	–
Elabe	26–27 Apr 2016	911	42%	1.5%	1%	11.5%	2.5%	–	–	–	–	25.5%	11.5%	–	–	–	18%	3.5%	–	25%	–
BVA	15–17 Apr 2016	949	30%	1%	2%	13.5%	3%	–	13.5%	–	–	–	–	35%	–	–	–	5%	–	27%	–
BVA	15–17 Apr 2016	949	30%	1%	2%	12%	3%	–	14%	–	–	–	12%	–	22%	–	–	6%	–	28%	–
BVA	15–17 Apr 2016	949	30%	1.5%	2.5%	13%	3%	–	14%	–	–	–	11%	–	–	21%	–	5%	–	29%	–
BVA	15–17 Apr 2016	949	30%	2%	2%	13%	3%	–	15%	–	–	–	11%	–	–	–	18%	6%	–	30%	–
TNS Sofres	15–16 Apr 2016	1,011	30%	2%	2%	12%	4%	–	13%	–	–	–	–	35%	–	–	–	6%	–	26%	–
TNS Sofres	15–16 Apr 2016	1,011	30%	1.5%	2.5%	13%	3%	–	14%	–	–	–	12%	–	23%	–	–	6%	–	25%	–
TNS Sofres	15–16 Apr 2016	1,011	30%	2%	3%	14%	4%	–	14%	–	–	–	–	–	–	23%	–	8%	–	32%	–
TNS Sofres	15–16 Apr 2016	1,011	30%	2%	3%	16%	5%	–	15%	–	–	–	–	–	–	–	21%	8%	–	30%	–
TNS Sofres	15–16 Apr 2016	1,011	30%	2%	3%	14%	4%	–	16%	–	–	–	–	–	24%	–	–	8%	–	29%	–
Odoxa	14–15 Apr 2016	949	–	1%	2%	11%	1%	–	14%	–	–	–	–	34%	–	–	–	5%	–	32%	–
Odoxa	14–15 Apr 2016	949	–	1%	2%	11%	2%	–	15%	–	–	–	13%	–	20%	–	–	5%	–	31%	–
Odoxa	14–15 Apr 2016	949	–	1%	2%	12%	2%	–	–	–	–	18%	–	29%	–	–	–	5%	–	31%	–
Odoxa	14–15 Apr 2016	949	–	1%	2%	11%	2%	–	–	–	–	21%	10%	–	19%	–	–	4%	–	30%	–
Ifop-Fiducial	12–14 Apr 2016	1,876	–	1%	1%	12%	1.5%	–	15%	–	–	–	–	37%	–	–	–	5%	–	27%	0.5%
Ifop-Fiducial	12–14 Apr 2016	1,876	–	1%	1%	12.5%	1.5%	–	16%	–	–	–	14%	–	21%	–	–	5%	–	27.5%	0.5%
Ifop-Fiducial	12–14 Apr 2016	1,876	–	1%	1.5%	12.5%	1.5%	–	16%	–	–	–	12%	–	–	21%	–	6%	–	28%	0.5%
Ifop-Fiducial	12–14 Apr 2016	1,876	–	1%	1%	13.5%	1.5%	–	16%	–	–	–	13%	–	–	–	20%	5.5%	–	28%	0.5%
Ifop-Fiducial	12–14 Apr 2016	1,876	–	1%	1%	11%	1%	–	14%	–	–	–	7%	34%	–	–	–	4%	–	26.5%	0.5%
Ifop-Fiducial	12–14 Apr 2016	1,876	–	1%	1%	12.5%	1.5%	–	–	16%	–	–	–	36%	–	–	–	4.5%	–	27%	0.5%
Ifop-Fiducial	12–14 Apr 2016	1,876	–	1%	1%	13.5%	1.5%	–	–	17%	–	–	12.5%	–	21%	–	–	5%	–	27%	0.5%
Ifop-Fiducial	12–14 Apr 2016	1,876	–	0.5%	1.5%	10.5%	–	7%	14%	–	–	–	–	36%	–	–	–	4%	–	26%	0.5%
Ifop-Fiducial	12–14 Apr 2016	1,876	–	1%	1%	11%	1%	–	14%	–	3.5%	–	–	36%	–	–	–	5%	–	27%	0.5%
Ifop-Fiducial	12–14 Apr 2016	1,876	–	1%	2%	12%	1%	–	–	–	4%	16%	–	33%	–	–	–	4.5%	–	26%	0.5%
Harris Interactive	11–13 Apr 2016	1,535	–	2%	1%	11%	2%	11%	13%	–	–	–	–	26%	–	–	–	5%	–	29%	–
Harris Interactive	11–13 Apr 2016	1,535	–	1%	1%	10%	1%	9%	14%	–	–	–	12%	–	19%	–	–	6%	–	27%	–
Ipsos	11–20 Mar 2016	13,693	–	1.5%	1.5%	11%	3%	–	15%	–	–	–	–	36%	–	–	–	5%	–	27%	–
Ipsos	11–20 Mar 2016	13,693	–	1.5%	1.5%	11%	3%	–	16%	–	–	–	13%	–	21%	–	–	6%	–	27%	–
Ipsos	11–20 Mar 2016	13,693	–	1.5%	1.5%	10%	3%	–	14%	–	–	–	8%	31%	–	–	–	5%	–	26%	–
Ifop-Fiducial	11–14 Mar 2016	1,026	–	1.5%	2.5%	15%	2.5%	–	–	–	–	14%	–	32%	–	–	–	3%	–	29.5%	–
Ifop-Fiducial	11–14 Mar 2016	1,026	–	1%	2%	15%	2.5%	–	–	–	–	17%	11%	–	19%	–	–	4.5%	–	28%	–
Ifop-Fiducial	17–19 Feb 2016	1,843	–	1%	1%	11%	2%	–	18%	–	–	–	–	35%	–	–	–	4%	–	28%	–
Ifop-Fiducial	17–19 Feb 2016	1,843	–	1%	1.5%	11.5%	2%	–	18%	–	–	–	15%	–	21%	–	–	5%	–	25%	–
Ifop-Fiducial	17–19 Feb 2016	1,843	–	1%	1%	12%	2.5%	–	18%	–	–	–	14.5%	–	–	18%	–	5%	–	28%	–
Ifop-Fiducial	17–19 Feb 2016	1,843	–	1%	1%	12%	3%	–	18%	–	–	–	15%	–	–	–	17%	5%	–	28%	–
Ifop-Fiducial	17–19 Feb 2016	1,843	–	1%	1%	10%	2.5%	–	16%	–	–	–	8.5%	30%	–	–	–	4%	–	27%	–
Ifop-Fiducial	17–19 Feb 2016	1,843	–	1%	1.5%	12%	–	–	18%	–	–	–	15.5%	–	21%	–	–	5%	–	26%	–
Ifop-Fiducial	17–19 Feb 2016	1,843	–	2%	3.5%	–	–	–	22%	–	–	–	18%	–	21.5%	–	–	5%	–	28%	–
Ipsos	22–31 Jan 2016	14,954	–	1.5%	1.5%	8.5%	2.5%	–	18%	–	–	–	8%	31%	–	–	–	4%	–	25%	–
Ipsos	22–31 Jan 2016	14,954	–	1.5%	1.5%	9%	3%	–	20%	–	–	–	13%	–	21%	–	–	5%	–	26%	–
Ipsos	22–31 Jan 2016	14,954	–	1.5%	1.5%	9%	3%	–	20%	–	–	–	12%	–	–	19%	–	5%	–	29%	–
Odoxa	14–15 Jan 2016	1,011	–	1%	2%	9%	3%	–	16%	–	–	–	–	34%	–	–	–	5%	–	30%	–
Odoxa	14–15 Jan 2016	1,011	–	1%	1%	11%	2%	–	19%	–	–	–	13%	–	20%	–	–	5%	–	28%	–
Odoxa	14–15 Jan 2016	1,011	–	2%	2%	11%	2%	–	–	–	–	19%	–	32%	–	–	–	4%	–	28%	–
Odoxa	14–15 Jan 2016	1,011	–	2%	1%	12%	2%	–	–	–	–	22%	12%	–	18%	–	–	4%	–	27%	–

With additional sponsorship-collecting candidates

Polling firm	Fieldwork date	Sample size	Arthaud LO	Poutou NPA	Mélenchon FI	Duflot EELV	Hollande PS	Montebourg PS	Bayrou MoDem	Lassalle MoDem	Yade LFQO	Sarkozy LR	Guaino LR	Dupont-Aignan DLF	Asselineau UPR	Le Pen FN	Cheminade S&P
Ifop-Fiducial	14–17 Jun 2016	1,858	0.5%	1%	12%	1%	14.5%	4.5%	11%	0.5%	1%	21%	1%	4%	0.5%	27.5%	<0.5%

=== 9 October 2012 to 13 January 2016 ===
Polling firm	Fieldwork date	Sample size	Abs.	Arthaud LO	Poutou NPA	Besancenot NPA	Mélenchon FG	Joly EELV	Duflot EELV	Hollande PS	Valls PS	Montebourg PS	Aubry PS	Bayrou MoDem	Juppé LR	Sarkozy LR	Fillon LR	Copé LR	Dupont-Aignan DLF	Villiers MPF	Le Pen FN	Cheminade S&P
Ifop	14–17 Dec 2015	1,800	–	1%	1%	–	9.5%	–	2.5%	20.5%	–	–	–	–	34%	–	–	–	5%	–	26.5%	–
Ifop	14–17 Dec 2015	1,800	–	1%	1%	–	9%	–	2%	22%	–	–	–	12%	–	21%	–	–	5%	–	27%	–
Ifop	14–17 Dec 2015	1,800	–	1%	1%	–	9%	–	2%	23%	–	–	–	10%	–	–	19.5%	–	5.5%	–	29%	–
Ifop	14–17 Dec 2015	1,800	–	1%	1%	–	8.5%	–	2%	20.5%	–	–	–	6.5%	30%	–	–	–	4.5%	–	26%	–
Ifop	14–17 Dec 2015	1,800	–	1%	1%	–	9%	–	2%	22.5%	–	–	–	12%	–	22%	–	–	–	3%	27.5%	–
TNS Sofres	14–15 Dec 2015	1,000	–	1%	1.5%	–	11%	–	3%	20%	–	–	–	–	31%	–	–	–	4.5%	–	28%	–
TNS Sofres	14–15 Dec 2015	1,000	–	1%	1.5%	–	10.5%	–	3%	19%	–	–	–	10.5%	–	24%	–	–	4.5%	–	26%	–
TNS Sofres	14–15 Dec 2015	1,000	–	1%	1.5%	–	12%	–	3%	22%	–	–	–	–	–	26%	–	–	7%	–	27.5%	–
Harris Interactive	13 Dec 2015	1,020	–	1%	1%	–	10%	–	3%	22%	–	–	–	–	29%	–	–	–	7%	–	27%	–
Harris Interactive	13 Dec 2015	1,020	–	1%	1%	–	10%	–	3%	21%	–	–	–	12%	–	21%	–	–	4%	–	27%	–
Ifop-Fiducial	31 Oct–4 Nov 2015	937	–	1%	2%	–	9%	–	3%	20.5%	–	–	–	–	31.5%	–	–	–	4%	–	29%	–
Ifop-Fiducial	31 Oct–4 Nov 2015	937	–	1%	1.5%	–	8%	–	2%	21%	–	–	–	12%	–	23%	–	–	3.5%	–	28%	–
Ifop-Fiducial	31 Oct–4 Nov 2015	937	–	1%	2%	–	8%	–	2%	19%	–	–	–	9%	27%	–	–	–	3%	–	29%	–
Ifop	3–4 Sep 2015	1,002	–	1%	1%	–	10%	–	2%	19%	–	–	–	10%	25%	–	–	–	3%	–	29%	–
Ifop	3–4 Sep 2015	1,002	–	1%	1.5%	–	10%	–	2%	19%	–	–	–	11.5%	–	25%	–	–	3%	–	27%	–
Ifop	17–19 Aug 2015	950	–	1.5%	1.5%	–	9%	–	3%	20%	–	–	–	11%	–	24%	–	–	4%	–	26%	–
Ifop	17–19 Aug 2015	950	–	1.5%	1.5%	–	10%	–	2%	–	22%	–	–	11%	–	23%	–	–	3%	–	26%	–
Ifop	17–19 Aug 2015	950	–	1%	1%	–	13%	–	4%	–	–	8%	–	17%	–	25%	–	–	4%	–	27%	–
Ifop	17–21 Jul 2015	944	–	1%	1%	–	9%	–	3%	18%	–	–	–	9%	28%	–	–	–	4%	–	27%	–
Ifop	17–21 Jul 2015	944	–	1%	1%	–	9%	–	3%	21%	–	–	–	12%	–	23%	–	–	3%	–	27%	–
Odoxa	21–22 May 2015	911	–	1%	2%	–	11%	–	2%	16%	–	–	–	–	34%	–	–	–	3%	–	31%	–
Odoxa	21–22 May 2015	911	–	1%	1%	–	10%	–	2%	17%	–	–	–	12%	–	25%	–	–	2%	–	30%	–
Odoxa	29–30 Apr 2015	1,021	–	1%	1%	–	10%	–	2%	17%	–	–	–	9%	–	28%	–	–	3%	–	29%	–
Odoxa	29–30 Apr 2015	1,021	–	1%	1%	–	8%	–	2%	–	20%	–	–	10%	–	26%	–	–	3%	–	29%	–
OpinionWay	15–16 Apr 2015	979	–	1%	0%	–	11%	–	2%	15%	–	–	–	6%	32%	–	–	–	4%	–	29%	0%
OpinionWay	15–16 Apr 2015	979	–	1%	0%	–	12%	–	2%	16%	–	–	–	12%	–	28%	–	–	3%	–	26%	0%
CSA	27–29 Jan 2015	951	–	0.5%	–	3%	11%	–	2%	18%	–	–	–	9%	22%	–	–	–	2.5%	–	32%	–
CSA	27–29 Jan 2015	951	–	0.5%	–	3%	10%	–	2.5%	19%	–	–	–	11%	–	22.5%	–	–	2.5%	–	29%	–
CSA	27–29 Jan 2015	951	–	0.5%	–	2.5%	10%	–	3%	–	21%	–	–	8%	19%	–	–	–	3%	–	33%	–
CSA	27–29 Jan 2015	951	–	0.5%	–	3%	9%	–	2%	–	22.5%	–	–	10%	–	21.5%	–	–	2.5%	–	29%	–
Ifop	21–23 Jan 2015	983	–	1%	2%	–	8%	–	4%	21%	–	–	–	7%	23%	–	–	–	3%	–	31%	–
Ifop	21–23 Jan 2015	983	–	1%	2%	–	8%	–	3%	21%	–	–	–	9%	–	23%	–	–	4%	–	29%	–
Ifop	21–23 Jan 2015	983	–	1.5%	1.5%	–	8%	–	3%	–	23%	–	–	7%	22%	–	–	–	3%	–	31%	–
Ifop	21–23 Jan 2015	983	–	1%	1%	–	8%	–	4%	–	23%	–	–	7%	–	23%	–	–	3%	–	30%	–
Ifop-Fiducial	28–30 Oct 2014	1,382	–	1.5%	1.5%	–	10%	–	4%	15%	–	–	–	–	32%	–	–	–	4%	–	32%	–
Ifop-Fiducial	28–30 Oct 2014	1,382	–	1.5%	1.5%	–	9%	–	3%	14%	–	–	–	13%	–	26%	–	–	3%	–	29%	–
Ifop-Fiducial	28–30 Oct 2014	1,382	–	1.5%	1.5%	–	9%	–	4%	14%	–	–	–	16%	–	–	18%	–	5%	–	31%	–
Ifop-Fiducial	28–30 Oct 2014	1,382	–	1.5%	1.5%	–	9%	–	3%	13%	–	–	–	10%	28%	–	–	–	4%	–	30%	–
Ifop-Fiducial	28–30 Oct 2014	1,382	–	1.5%	1.5%	–	9%	–	–	15%	–	–	–	14%	–	26%	–	–	4%	–	29%	–
Ifop-Fiducial	28–30 Oct 2014	1,382	–	2%	1.5%	–	8.5%	–	3%	–	15%	–	–	13%	–	27%	–	–	3%	–	27%	–
Ifop-Fiducial	28–30 Oct 2014	1,382	–	1.5%	1.5%	–	9%	–	2%	–	–	–	13%	10%	30%	–	–	–	4%	–	29%	–
Ifop-Fiducial	28–30 Oct 2014	1,382	–	2%	1.5%	–	8%	–	3%	–	–	–	14%	14%	–	27%	–	–	3.5%	–	27%	–
Ifop	3–4 Sep 2014	994	–	1%	1%	–	10%	–	3%	16%	–	–	–	11%	24%	–	–	–	4%	–	30%	–
Ifop	3–4 Sep 2014	994	–	1%	1%	–	10%	–	3%	16%	–	–	–	12%	–	25%	–	–	4%	–	28%	–
Ifop	3–4 Sep 2014	994	–	1%	1%	–	10%	–	3%	17%	–	–	–	14%	–	–	17%	–	5%	–	32%	–
Ifop	21–22 Jul 2014	947	–	2%	1%	–	10%	–	3%	17%	–	–	–	13%	–	25%	–	–	3%	–	26%	–
Ifop	21–22 Jul 2014	947	–	2%	1%	–	11%	–	3%	–	17%	–	–	12%	–	25%	–	–	3%	–	26%	–
Ifop	21–22 Jul 2014	947	–	2%	1%	–	11%	–	4%	–	–	10%	–	16%	–	26%	–	–	3%	–	27%	–
Ifop	15–18 Apr 2014	998	–	0.5%	1.5%	–	9%	3%	–	18%	–	–	–	10%	30%	–	–	–	2%	–	26%	<0.5%
Ifop	15–18 Apr 2014	998	–	0.5%	1.5%	–	9%	3%	–	18%	–	–	–	11%	–	31%	–	–	2%	–	24%	<0.5%
Ifop	15–18 Apr 2014	998	–	1%	1.5%	–	9%	3%	–	19%	–	–	–	13%	–	–	22%	–	2.5%	–	29%	<0.5%
OpinionWay	11–13 Apr 2014	988	–	1%	2%	–	11%	2%	–	19%	–	–	–	8%	–	29%	–	–	3%	–	25%	0%
BVA	2–3 May 2013	1,086	–	1%	1%	–	11%	2%	–	20%	–	–	–	10%	–	29%	–	–	2%	–	24%	<0.5%
Future Thinking	26–29 Apr 2013	1,000	–	<0.5%	1%	–	15%	2%	–	15%	–	–	–	10%	–	32%	–	–	3%	–	22%	<0.5%
Future Thinking	26–29 Apr 2013	1,000	–	<0.5%	1%	–	16%	2%	–	18%	–	–	–	13%	–	–	16%	–	3%	–	29%	1%
Future Thinking	26–29 Apr 2013	1,000	–	1%	1%	–	16%	3%	–	18%	–	–	–	14%	–	–	–	11%	4%	–	31%	1%
CSA	26–28 Apr 2013	993	–	<0.5%	1%	–	12%	2%	–	19%	–	–	–	7%	–	34%	–	–	1%	–	23%	1%
OpinionWay	16–17 Apr 2013	971	–	0.5%	0.5%	–	11%	3%	–	23%	–	–	–	11%	–	28%	–	–	2%	–	21%	0%
Ifop-Fiducial	11–15 Apr 2013	1,967	–	0.5%	1%	–	11%	1.5%	–	22%	–	–	–	10%	–	30%	–	–	2%	–	22%	<0.5%
Ifop	9–12 Oct 2012	1,607	–	0.5%	1.5%	–	10%	2%	–	28%	–	–	–	7%	–	29.5%	–	–	2%	–	19.5%	<0.5%
2012 election	22 Apr 2012	–	20.52%	0.56%	1.15%	–	11.10%	2.31%	–	28.63%	–	–	–	9.13%	–	27.18%	–	–	1.79%	–	17.90%	0.25%

== Second round ==
After the first round of the 2002 presidential election, in which opinion polls failed to anticipate Jean-Marie Le Pen advancing to the second round, the French polling commission (Commission nationale des sondages) recommended that pollsters not publish second-round surveys before the results of the first round. However, understanding that polling institutes would nevertheless be likely to do so, it also recommended that second-round scenarios be tested based on first-round polling, and to test several plausible scenarios, broadly construed.

Ifop-Fiducial and OpinionWay polls listed in the tables below starting in February 2017 are "rolling" polls unless otherwise denoted by an asterisk (*). Polls marked with three asterisks (***) from Scan Research/Le Terrain use CATI and random number dialing, unlike all other pollsters, which conduct online surveys using the quota method. The polling commission published notices for each of the two polls conducted by Scan Research/Le Terrain.

The publication of second-round polls was prohibited after midnight on 5 May 2017.

=== Graphical summary ===
The averages in the graphs below were constructed using polls listed below conducted by the eight major French pollsters. The graphs are smoothed 14-day weighted moving averages, using only the most recent poll conducted by any given pollster within that range (each poll weighted based on recency). The actual votes gave 66,10% to Macron and 33.90% to Le Pen of expressed votes, shown by larger dots on the right side of the curves.

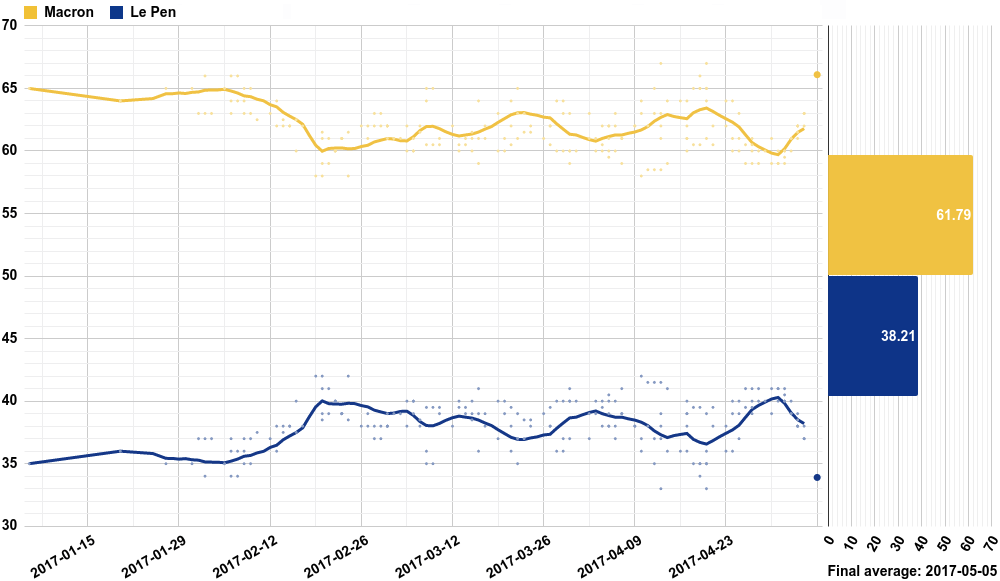

=== Macron–Le Pen ===
Polling firm	Fieldwork date	Sample size	Abs.	Macron EM	Le Pen FN
2017 election	7 May 2017	–	25.44%	66.10%	33.90%
Ipsos	5 May 2017	5,331	24%	63%	37%
Harris Interactive	4–5 May 2017	2,270	–	62%	38%
Ifop-Fiducial	2–5 May 2017	1,861	24.5%	63%	37%
Elabe	4 May 2017	1,009	32%	62%	38%
Ipsos	4 May 2017	1,605	24%	61.5%	38.5%
Odoxa	4 May 2017	809	25%	62%	38%
OpinionWay	2–4 May 2017	2,264	–	62%	38%
Ifop-Fiducial	1–4 May 2017	1,400	25%	61%	39%
Harris Interactive	2–3 May 2017	2,349	–	61%	39%
OpinionWay	1–3 May 2017	2,264	–	61%	39%
Ifop-Fiducial	30 Apr–3 May 2017	1,405	26%	60%	40%
BVA	1–2 May 2017	1,012	20%	60%	40%
OpinionWay	30 Apr–2 May 2017	1,936	–	60%	40%
Elabe	28 Apr–2 May 2017	3,817	32%	59%	41%
Ifop-Fiducial	28 Apr–2 May 2017	1,388	27%	59.5%	40.5%
Ipsos	30 Apr–1 May 2017	8,936	24%	59%	41%
OpinionWay	29 Apr–1 May 2017	1,764	–	60%	40%
Ifop-Fiducial	27 Apr–1 May 2017	1,385	28%	59%	41%
Kantar Sofres	28–30 Apr 2017	1,031	–	59%	41%
OpinionWay	28–30 Apr 2017	1,488	–	61%	39%
Ipsos	28–29 Apr 2017	918	25%	60%	40%
BVA	26–28 Apr 2017	944	22%	59%	41%
Ifop-Fiducial	25–28 Apr 2017	1,399	29%	60%	40%
Odoxa	26–27 Apr 2017	803	–	59%	41%
Harris Interactive	25–27 Apr 2017	940	–	61%	39%
OpinionWay	25–27 Apr 2017	1,790	–	60%	40%
Ifop-Fiducial	24–27 Apr 2017	1,407	29%	60.5%	39.5%
OpinionWay	24–26 Apr 2017	1,800	–	59%	41%
Ifop-Fiducial	23–26 Apr 2017	1,893	28%	60.5%	39.5%
Odoxa	24–25 Apr 2017	1,000	–	63%	37%
Ifop-Fiducial	23–25 Apr 2017	1,416	27%	61%	39%
OpinionWay	23–25 Apr 2017	2,828	–	60%	40%
Elabe	24 Apr 2017	967	31%	64%	36%
Ifop-Fiducial	23–24 Apr 2017	846	26%	60%	40%
OpinionWay	23–24 Apr 2017	2,222	–	61%	39%
OpinionWay	23–24 Apr 2017	1,461	–	61%	39%
Harris Interactive	23 Apr 2017	2,684	–	64%	36%
Ipsos	23 Apr 2017	1,379	–	62%	38%
Odoxa	21 Apr 2017	774	–	62%	38%
Ifop-Fiducial	18–21 Apr 2017	2,823	–	60.5%	39.5%
Odoxa	20 Apr 2017	1,433	–	65%	35%
Elabe	19–20 Apr 2017	1,445	–	65%	35%
Harris Interactive	18–20 Apr 2017	962	–	67%	33%
OpinionWay	18–20 Apr 2017	2,269	–	64%	36%
Ifop-Fiducial	17–20 Apr 2017	2,810	–	61%	39%
BVA	18–19 Apr 2017	947	–	65%	35%
Harris Interactive	18–19 Apr 2017	2,812	–	66%	34%
OpinionWay	17–19 Apr 2017	2,394	–	65%	35%
Ifop-Fiducial	16–19 Apr 2017	2,792	–	60.5%	39.5%
OpinionWay	16–18 Apr 2017	2,417	–	65%	35%
Ifop-Fiducial	14–18 Apr 2017	2,804	–	60.5%	39.5%
Elabe	16–17 Apr 2017	1,438	–	62%	38%
Ipsos	16–17 Apr 2017	8,274	–	61%	39%
OpinionWay	15–17 Apr 2017	2,423	–	64%	36%
Kantar Sofres	14–17 Apr 2017	982	–	61%	39%
Ifop-Fiducial	13–17 Apr 2017	2,796	–	60%	40%
OpinionWay	14–16 Apr 2017	2,168	–	64%	36%
Le Terrain***	13–15 Apr 2017	642	–	71%	29%
BVA	12–14 Apr 2017	918	–	64%	36%
Ifop-Fiducial	11–14 Apr 2017	2,776	–	59%	41%
Ipsos	12–13 Apr 2017	927	–	63%	37%
Odoxa	12–13 Apr 2017	732	–	61%	39%
Harris Interactive	11–13 Apr 2017	904	–	67%	33%
OpinionWay	11–13 Apr 2017	1,443	–	62%	38%
Ifop-Fiducial	10–13 Apr 2017	2,797	–	58.5%	41.5%
Elabe	11–12 Apr 2017	1,010	–	65%	35%
OpinionWay	10–12 Apr 2017	1,423	–	63%	37%
Ifop-Fiducial	9–12 Apr 2017	2,800	–	58.5%	41.5%
OpinionWay	9–11 Apr 2017	1,395	–	62%	38%
Ifop-Fiducial	7–11 Apr 2017	2,806	–	58.5%	41.5%
Elabe	9–10 Apr 2017	1,002	–	64%	36%
OpinionWay	8–10 Apr 2017	1,498	–	63%	37%
Ifop-Fiducial	6–10 Apr 2017	2,616	–	58%	42%
Ipsos	7–9 Apr 2017	1,002	–	62%	38%
OpinionWay	7–9 Apr 2017	1,565	–	62%	38%
BVA	5–7 Apr 2017	861	–	61%	39%
Kantar Sofres	5–7 Apr 2017	934	–	61%	39%
Ifop-Fiducial	4–7 Apr 2017	2,246	–	59%	41%
Harris Interactive	5–6 Apr 2017	928	–	63%	37%
OpinionWay	4–6 Apr 2017	1,589	–	62%	38%
Ifop-Fiducial	3–6 Apr 2017	2,243	–	60%	40%
Elabe	5 Apr 2017	995	–	62%	38%
Harris Interactive	5 Apr 2017	2,097	–	62%	38%
Odoxa	5 Apr 2017	766	–	61%	39%
Harris Interactive	3–4 Apr 2017	3,639	–	62%	38%
OpinionWay	3–5 Apr 2017	1,553	–	60%	40%
Ifop-Fiducial	2–5 Apr 2017	2,245	–	59.5%	40.5%
OpinionWay	2–4 Apr 2017	1,541	–	60%	40%
Ifop-Fiducial	31 Mar–4 Apr 2017	2,254	–	60.5%	39.5%
OpinionWay	1–3 Apr 2017	1,583	–	61%	39%
Ifop-Fiducial	30 Mar–3 Apr 2017	2,232	–	60%	40%
Ipsos	31 Mar–2 Apr 2017	9,460	–	61%	39%
OpinionWay	31 Mar–2 Apr 2017	1,624	–	63%	37%
Ifop-Fiducial	28–31 Mar 2017	2,204	–	60%	40%
BVA	29–30 Mar 2017	872	–	60%	40%
Odoxa	29–30 Mar 2017	753	–	59%	41%
OpinionWay	28–30 Mar 2017	1,609	–	63%	37%
Ifop-Fiducial	27–30 Mar 2017	2,215	–	60%	40%
Elabe	28–29 Mar 2017	998	–	63%	37%
OpinionWay	27–29 Mar 2017	1,636	–	64%	36%
Ifop-Fiducial	26–29 Mar 2017	2,241	–	60%	40%
OpinionWay	26–28 Mar 2017	1,618	–	64%	36%
Ifop-Fiducial	24–28 Mar 2017	2,231	–	60%	40%
Ipsos	25–27 Mar 2017	1,005	–	62%	38%
OpinionWay	25–27 Mar 2017	1,599	–	62%	38%
Ifop-Fiducial	23–27 Mar 2017	2,235	–	60.5%	39.5%
Le Terrain***	23–27 Mar 2017	647	–	70%	30%
OpinionWay	24–26 Mar 2017	1,676	–	61%	39%
BVA	22–24 Mar 2017	880	–	62%	38%
Ifop-Fiducial	21–24 Mar 2017	2,225	–	61.5%	38.5%
OpinionWay	21–23 Mar 2017	1,675	–	63%	37%
Ifop-Fiducial	20–23 Mar 2017	2,245	–	61.5%	38.5%
Harris Interactive	21–22 Mar 2017	6,383	–	65%	35%
OpinionWay	20–22 Mar 2017	1,672	–	63%	37%
Ifop-Fiducial	19–22 Mar 2017	1,974	–	61%	39%
Elabe	21 Mar 2017	997	–	64%	36%
OpinionWay	19–21 Mar 2017	1,676	–	62%	38%
Ifop-Fiducial	18–21 Mar 2017	1,695	–	60.5%	39.5%
Ifop-Fiducial	18–20 Mar 2017	935	–	60%	40%
OpinionWay	18–20 Mar 2017	1,667	–	61%	39%
Elabe	17–19 Mar 2017	2,847	–	63%	37%
OpinionWay	17–19 Mar 2017	1,593	–	60%	40%
BVA	15–17 Mar 2017	858	–	62%	38%
Ifop-Fiducial	14–17 Mar 2017	1,376	–	61%	39%
Odoxa	15–16 Mar 2017	603	–	64%	36%
OpinionWay	14–16 Mar 2017	1,571	–	59%	41%
Ifop-Fiducial	13–16 Mar 2017	1,386	–	61%	39%
Ipsos	14–15 Mar 2017	8,205	–	61%	39%
OpinionWay	13–15 Mar 2017	1,554	–	60%	40%
Ifop-Fiducial	12–15 Mar 2017	1,399	–	61.5%	38.5%
OpinionWay	12–14 Mar 2017	1,529	–	61%	39%
Ifop-Fiducial	10–14 Mar 2017	1,413	–	60.5%	39.5%
OpinionWay	11–13 Mar 2017	1,528	–	60%	40%
Future Thinking	10–13 Mar 2017	717	–	59.5%	40.5%
Ifop-Fiducial	9–13 Mar 2017	1,397	–	60.5%	39.5%
OpinionWay	10–12 Mar 2017	1,610	–	62%	38%
BVA	8–10 Mar 2017	839	–	61%	39%
Ifop-Fiducial	7–10 Mar 2017	1,379	–	60.5%	39.5%
OpinionWay	7–9 Mar 2017	1,571	–	65%	35%
Ifop-Fiducial	6–9 Mar 2017	1,395	–	60.5%	39.5%
Harris Interactive	6–8 Mar 2017	4,533	–	65%	35%
OpinionWay	6–8 Mar 2017	1,509	–	64%	36%
Ifop-Fiducial	5–8 Mar 2017	1,394	–	60.5%	39.5%
OpinionWay	5–7 Mar 2017	1,574	–	62%	38%
Ifop-Fiducial	3–7 Mar 2017	1,390	–	61.5%	38.5%
Elabe	5–6 Mar 2017	1,000	–	60%	40%
OpinionWay	4–6 Mar 2017	1,559	–	60%	40%
Ifop-Fiducial	2–6 Mar 2017	1,381	–	61%	39%
OpinionWay	3–5 Mar 2017	1,671	–	60%	40%
Ipsos	1–5 Mar 2017	10,854	–	62%	38%
Ifop-Fiducial*	2–4 Mar 2017	1,822	–	61%	39%
Ifop-Fiducial	28 Feb–3 Mar 2017	1,383	–	61%	39%
BVA	28 Feb–2 Mar 2017	855	–	62%	38%
Elabe	28 Feb–2 Mar 2017	1,507	–	62%	38%
OpinionWay	28 Feb–2 Mar 2017	1,654	–	62%	38%
Ifop-Fiducial	27 Feb–2 Mar 2017	1,394	–	61%	39%
OpinionWay	27 Feb–1 Mar 2017	1,639	–	63%	37%
Ifop-Fiducial	26 Feb–1 Mar 2017	1,392	–	62%	38%
OpinionWay	26–28 Feb 2017	1,629	–	63%	37%
Ifop-Fiducial	24–28 Feb 2017	1,398	–	62%	38%
OpinionWay	25–27 Feb 2017	1,624	–	61%	39%
Ifop-Fiducial	23–27 Feb 2017	1,404	–	62%	38%
OpinionWay	24–26 Feb 2017	1,631	–	62%	38%
Kantar Sofres	23–24 Feb 2017	600	–	58%	42%
Ifop-Fiducial	21–24 Feb 2017	1,417	–	61.5%	38.5%
Odoxa	22–23 Feb 2017	879	–	61%	39%
OpinionWay	21–23 Feb 2017	1,431	–	61%	39%
Ifop-Fiducial	20–23 Feb 2017	1,395	–	61%	39%
Harris Interactive	20–22 Feb 2017	5,249	–	60%	40%
OpinionWay	20–22 Feb 2017	1,615	–	60%	40%
Ifop-Fiducial	19–22 Feb 2017	1,399	–	60%	40%
OpinionWay	19–21 Feb 2017	1,545	–	59%	41%
Ifop-Fiducial	17–21 Feb 2017	1,386	–	61%	39%
BVA	19–20 Feb 2017	554	–	61%	39%
Elabe	18–20 Feb 2017	995	–	59%	41%
OpinionWay	18–20 Feb 2017	1,535	–	58%	42%
Ifop-Fiducial	16–20 Feb 2017	1,397	–	61.5%	38.5%
OpinionWay	17–19 Feb 2017	1,534	–	58%	42%
Ifop-Fiducial	14–17 Feb 2017	1,399	–	62%	38%
OpinionWay	14–16 Feb 2017	1,605	–	60%	40%
Ifop-Fiducial	13–16 Feb 2017	1,396	–	62.5%	37.5%
OpinionWay	13–15 Feb 2017	1,602	–	62%	38%
Ifop-Fiducial	12–15 Feb 2017	1,394	–	62%	38%
OpinionWay	12–14 Feb 2017	1,456	–	62%	38%
Ifop-Fiducial	10–14 Feb 2017	1,402	–	62.5%	37.5%
OpinionWay	11–13 Feb 2017	1,422	–	64%	36%
Ifop-Fiducial	9–13 Feb 2017	1,392	–	62%	38%
OpinionWay	10–12 Feb 2017	1,590	–	63%	37%
Ifop-Fiducial	7–10 Feb 2017	1,396	–	62.5%	37.5%
OpinionWay	7–9 Feb 2017	1,496	–	65%	35%
Ifop-Fiducial	6–9 Feb 2017	1,407	–	63%	37%
Elabe	7–8 Feb 2017	961	–	63%	37%
OpinionWay	6–8 Feb 2017	1,454	–	65%	35%
Ifop-Fiducial	5–8 Feb 2017	1,409	–	64%	36%
OpinionWay	5–7 Feb 2017	1,487	–	66%	34%
Ifop-Fiducial	3–7 Feb 2017	1,424	–	64%	36%
Elabe	4–6 Feb 2017	993	–	64%	36%
OpinionWay	4–6 Feb 2017	1,568	–	66%	34%
Ifop-Fiducial	2–6 Feb 2017	1,433	–	63%	37%
OpinionWay	3–5 Feb 2017	1,700	–	65%	35%
Ifop-Fiducial	31 Jan–3 Feb 2017	1,430	–	63%	37%
BVA	1–2 Feb 2017	580	–	66%	34%
Ifop-Fiducial	30 Jan–2 Feb 2017	1,414	–	63%	37%
Ifop-Fiducial	29 Jan–1 Feb 2017	1,409	–	63%	37%
Elabe	30–31 Jan 2017	993	–	65%	35%
Kantar Sofres	26–27 Jan 2017	600	–	65%	35%
Ipsos	20 Jan 2017	992	–	64%	36%
Ifop-Fiducial	3–6 Jan 2017	1,860	–	65%	35%
Ifop-Fiducial	28–30 Nov 2016	1,882	–	62%	38%
Odoxa*	14–15 Apr 2016	949	–	61%	39%
Odoxa*	14–15 Jan 2016	1,011	–	65%	35%

==== By first round vote ====
Polling firm	Fieldwork date	Sample size	Jean-Luc Mélenchon (19.58% in the first round)			Benoît Hamon (6.36% in the first round)			François Fillon (20.01% in the first round)		
Polling firm	Fieldwork date	Sample size	Macron	Le Pen	No vote	Macron	Le Pen	No vote	Macron	Le Pen	No vote
Ipsos	5 May 2017	5,331	55%	10%	35%	74%	3%	23%	48%	28%	24%
Harris Interactive	4–5 May 2017	2,270	46%	13%	41%	73%	7%	20%	44%	26%	30%
Ifop-Fiducial	2–5 May 2017	1,861	52%	10%	38%	71%	7%	22%	51%	22%	27%
Elabe	4 May 2017	1,009	54%	14%	32%	72%	7%	21%	45%	32%	23%
Ipsos	4 May 2017	1,605	51%	11%	38%	76%	3%	21%	46%	28%	26%
Odoxa	4 May 2017	809	47%	14%	39%	81%	2%	17%	54%	21%	25%
OpinionWay	2–4 May 2017	2,264	45%	17%	38%	74%	6%	20%	45%	27%	28%
Ifop-Fiducial	1–4 May 2017	1,400	53%	11%	36%	78%	4%	18%	49%	29%	22%
OpinionWay	1–3 May 2017	2,264	45%	16%	39%	77%	5%	18%	45%	28%	27%
Ifop-Fiducial	30 Apr–3 May 2017	1,405	52%	11%	37%	76%	5%	19%	48%	28%	24%
BVA	1–2 May 2017	1,012	44%	18%	38%	72%	7%	21%	46%	31%	23%
OpinionWay	30 Apr–2 May 2017	1,936	48%	15%	37%	76%	3%	21%	39%	27%	34%
Elabe	28 Apr–2 May 2017	3,817	44%	23%	33%	76%	8%	16%	46%	30%	24%
Ifop-Fiducial	28 Apr–2 May 2017	1,388	50%	13%	37%	75%	7%	18%	44%	30%	26%
Ipsos	30 Apr–1 May 2017	8,936	48%	14%	38%	75%	4%	21%	42%	32%	26%
OpinionWay	29 Apr–1 May 2017	1,764	42%	17%	41%	72%	6%	22%	42%	27%	31%
Ifop-Fiducial	27 Apr–1 May 2017	1,385	51%	14%	35%	73%	6%	21%	41%	31%	28%
Kantar Sofres	28–30 Apr 2017	1,031	52%	17%	31%	73%	8%	19%	49%	29%	22%
OpinionWay	28–30 Apr 2017	1,488	40%	15%	45%	74%	8%	18%	39%	26%	35%
Ipsos	28–29 Apr 2017	918	47%	19%	34%	76%	5%	19%	49%	25%	26%
BVA	26–28 Apr 2017	944	41%	18%	41%	71%	4%	25%	41%	26%	33%
Ifop-Fiducial	25–28 Apr 2017	1,399	49%	15%	36%	80%	1%	19%	41%	29%	30%
Odoxa	26–27 Apr 2017	803	40%	19%	41%	63%	8%	29%	50%	21%	29%
Harris Interactive	25–27 Apr 2017	940	45%	13%	42%	69%	5%	26%	42%	28%	30%
OpinionWay	25–27 Apr 2017	1,790	40%	15%	45%	68%	3%	29%	43%	29%	28%
Ifop-Fiducial	24–27 Apr 2017	1,407	45%	16%	39%	81%	2%	17%	45%	24%	31%
OpinionWay	24–26 Apr 2017	1,800	45%	17%	38%	64%	4%	32%	45%	29%	26%
Ifop-Fiducial	23–26 Apr 2017	1,893	47%	18%	35%	81%	6%	13%	43%	28%	29%
Ifop-Fiducial	23–25 Apr 2017	1,416	48%	19%	33%	83%	7%	10%	47%	26%	27%
OpinionWay	23–25 Apr 2017	2,828	50%	18%	32%	72%	2%	26%	43%	31%	26%
Elabe	24 Apr 2017	967	53%	16%	31%	75%	6%	19%	49%	28%	23%
Ifop-Fiducial	23–24 Apr 2017	846	51%	19%	30%	80%	8%	12%	41%	33%	26%
OpinionWay	23–24 Apr 2017	2,222	50%	17%	33%	71%	1%	28%	41%	32%	27%
OpinionWay	23–24 Apr 2017	1,461	55%	22%	23%	83%	3%	14%	44%	38%	18%
Harris Interactive	23 Apr 2017	2,684	52%	12%	36%	76%	3%	21%	47%	23%	30%
Ipsos	23 Apr 2017	1,379	62%	9%	29%	79%	4%	17%	48%	33%	19%

=== Fillon–Le Pen ===
Graphical summary

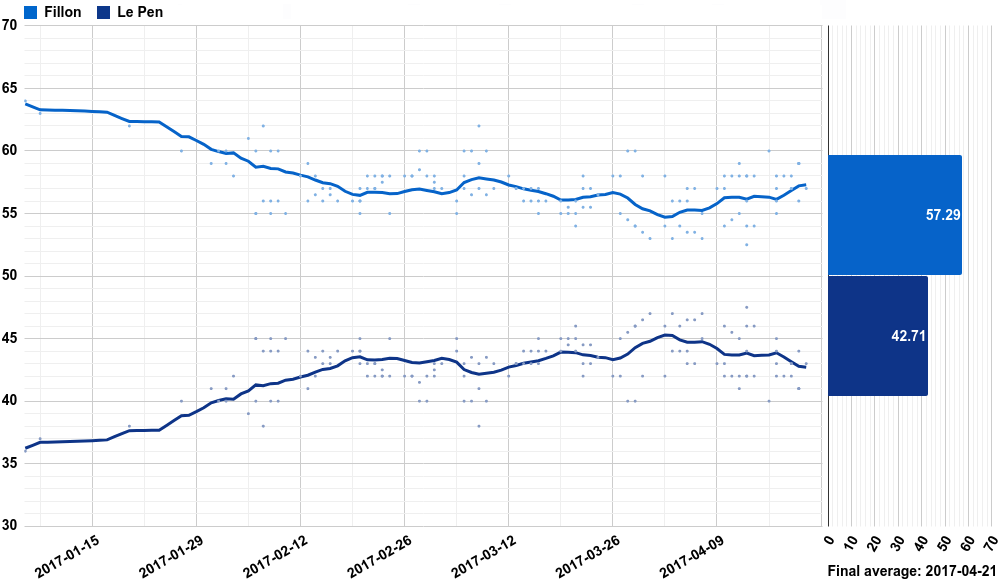

Polling firm	Fieldwork date	Sample size	Fillon LR	Le Pen FN
Odoxa	21 Apr 2017	774	57%	43%
Odoxa	20 Apr 2017	1,433	56%	44%
Elabe	19–20 Apr 2017	1,445	59%	41%
Harris Interactive	18–20 Apr 2017	962	59%	41%
OpinionWay	18–20 Apr 2017	2,269	59%	41%
BVA	18–19 Apr 2017	739	57%	43%
Harris Interactive	18–19 Apr 2017	2,812	58%	42%
OpinionWay	17–19 Apr 2017	2,394	57%	43%
OpinionWay	16–18 Apr 2017	2,417	58%	42%
Elabe	16–17 Apr 2017	1,438	57%	43%
Ipsos	16–17 Apr 2017	8,274	55%	45%
OpinionWay	15–17 Apr 2017	2,423	58%	42%
Kantar Sofres	14–17 Apr 2017	830	56%	44%
OpinionWay	14–16 Apr 2017	2,168	60%	40%
Le Terrain***	13–15 Apr 2017	642	64%	36%
BVA	12–14 Apr 2017	735	58%	42%
Ifop-Fiducial	11–14 Apr 2017	2,776	54%	46%
Ipsos	12–13 Apr 2017	927	56%	44%
Odoxa	12–13 Apr 2017	732	52.5%	47.5%
Harris Interactive	11–13 Apr 2017	904	58%	42%
OpinionWay	11–13 Apr 2017	1,443	58%	42%
Ifop-Fiducial	10–13 Apr 2017	2,797	54%	46%
Elabe	11–12 Apr 2017	1,010	58%	42%
OpinionWay	10–12 Apr 2017	1,423	59%	41%
Ifop-Fiducial	9–12 Apr 2017	2,800	55%	45%
OpinionWay	9–11 Apr 2017	1,395	58%	42%
Ifop-Fiducial	7–11 Apr 2017	2,806	54.5%	45.5%
Elabe	9–10 Apr 2017	1,002	58%	42%
OpinionWay	8–10 Apr 2017	1,498	57%	43%
Ifop-Fiducial	6–10 Apr 2017	2,616	54%	46%
OpinionWay	7–9 Apr 2017	1,565	57%	43%
Kantar Sofres	5–7 Apr 2017	741	55%	45%
Ifop-Fiducial	4–7 Apr 2017	2,246	53%	47%
OpinionWay	4–6 Apr 2017	1,589	57%	43%
Ifop-Fiducial	3–6 Apr 2017	2,243	53.5%	46.5%
Elabe	5 Apr 2017	995	57%	43%
OpinionWay	3–5 Apr 2017	1,553	56%	44%
Ifop-Fiducial	2–5 Apr 2017	2,245	53.5%	46.5%
OpinionWay	2–4 Apr 2017	1,541	56%	44%
Ifop-Fiducial	31 Mar–4 Apr 2017	2,254	54%	46%
OpinionWay	1–3 Apr 2017	1,583	56%	44%
Ifop-Fiducial	30 Mar–3 Apr 2017	2,232	53%	47%
Ipsos	31 Mar–2 Apr 2017	9,460	54%	46%
OpinionWay	31 Mar–2 Apr 2017	1,624	58%	42%
Ifop-Fiducial	28–31 Mar 2017	2,204	53%	47%
OpinionWay	28–30 Mar 2017	1,609	58%	42%
Ifop-Fiducial	27–30 Mar 2017	2,215	53.5%	46.5%
Elabe	28–29 Mar 2017	998	54%	46%
OpinionWay	27–29 Mar 2017	1,636	60%	40%
Ifop-Fiducial	26–29 Mar 2017	2,241	54%	46%
OpinionWay	26–28 Mar 2017	1,618	60%	40%
Ifop-Fiducial	24–28 Mar 2017	2,231	54.5%	45.5%
OpinionWay	25–27 Mar 2017	1,599	58%	42%
Ifop-Fiducial	23–27 Mar 2017	2,235	55%	45%
Le Terrain***	23–27 Mar 2017	553	62%	38%
OpinionWay	24–26 Mar 2017	1,676	58%	42%
Ifop-Fiducial	21–24 Mar 2017	2,225	56.5%	43.5%
OpinionWay	21–23 Mar 2017	1,675	57%	43%
Ifop-Fiducial	20–23 Mar 2017	2,245	55.5%	44.5%
Harris Interactive	21–22 Mar 2017	6,383	58%	42%
OpinionWay	20–22 Mar 2017	1,672	57%	43%
Ifop-Fiducial	19–22 Mar 2017	1,974	55.5%	44.5%
Elabe	21 Mar 2017	997	54%	46%
OpinionWay	19–21 Mar 2017	1,676	56%	44%
Ifop-Fiducial	18–21 Mar 2017	1,695	55%	45%
Ifop-Fiducial	18–20 Mar 2017	935	55.5%	44.5%
OpinionWay	18–20 Mar 2017	1,667	55%	45%
Elabe	17–19 Mar 2017	2,847	56%	44%
OpinionWay	17–19 Mar 2017	1,593	55%	45%
Ifop-Fiducial	14–17 Mar 2017	1,376	56%	44%
Odoxa	15–16 Mar 2017	493	57%	43%
OpinionWay	14–16 Mar 2017	1,571	55%	45%
Ifop-Fiducial	13–16 Mar 2017	1,386	56%	44%
OpinionWay	13–15 Mar 2017	1,554	56%	44%
Ifop-Fiducial	12–15 Mar 2017	1,399	57%	43%
OpinionWay	12–14 Mar 2017	1,529	56%	44%
Ifop-Fiducial	10–14 Mar 2017	1,413	57%	43%
OpinionWay	11–13 Mar 2017	1,528	57%	43%
Future Thinking	10–13 Mar 2017	580	55.5%	44.5%
Ifop-Fiducial	9–13 Mar 2017	1,397	57%	43%
OpinionWay	10–12 Mar 2017	1,610	58%	42%
Ifop-Fiducial	7–10 Mar 2017	1,379	57%	43%
OpinionWay	7–9 Mar 2017	1,571	60%	40%
Ifop-Fiducial	6–9 Mar 2017	1,395	56.5%	43.5%
Harris Interactive	6–8 Mar 2017	4,533	59%	41%
OpinionWay	6–8 Mar 2017	1,509	62%	38%
Ifop-Fiducial	5–8 Mar 2017	1,394	57%	43%
OpinionWay	5–7 Mar 2017	1,574	60%	40%
Ifop-Fiducial	3–7 Mar 2017	1,390	56.5%	43.5%
Elabe	5–6 Mar 2017	1,000	60%	40%
OpinionWay	4–6 Mar 2017	1,559	58%	42%
Ifop-Fiducial	2–6 Mar 2017	1,381	57%	43%
OpinionWay	3–5 Mar 2017	1,671	56%	44%
Ipsos	1–5 Mar 2017	10,854	55%	45%
Ifop-Fiducial	28 Feb–3 Mar 2017	1,383	57%	43%
Elabe	28 Feb–2 Mar 2017	1,507	58%	42%
OpinionWay	28 Feb–2 Mar 2017	1,654	57%	43%
Ifop-Fiducial	27 Feb–2 Mar 2017	1,394	57.5%	42.5%
OpinionWay	27 Feb–1 Mar 2017	1,639	60%	40%
Ifop-Fiducial	26 Feb–1 Mar 2017	1,392	58%	42%
OpinionWay	26–28 Feb 2017	1,629	60%	40%
Ifop-Fiducial	24–28 Feb 2017	1,398	58.5%	41.5%
OpinionWay	25–27 Feb 2017	1,624	58%	42%
Ifop-Fiducial	23–27 Feb 2017	1,404	58%	42%
OpinionWay	24–26 Feb 2017	1,631	58%	42%
Kantar Sofres	23–24 Feb 2017	600	55%	45%
Ifop-Fiducial	21–24 Feb 2017	1,417	58%	42%
Odoxa	22–23 Feb 2017	879	57.5%	42.5%
OpinionWay	21–23 Feb 2017	1,431	58%	42%
Ifop-Fiducial	20–23 Feb 2017	1,395	58%	42%
Harris Interactive	20–22 Feb 2017	5,249	57%	43%
OpinionWay	20–22 Feb 2017	1,615	58%	42%
Ifop-Fiducial	19–22 Feb 2017	1,399	57%	43%
OpinionWay	19–21 Feb 2017	1,545	58%	42%
Ifop-Fiducial	17–21 Feb 2017	1,386	57%	43%
BVA	19–20 Feb 2017	450	55%	45%
Elabe	18–20 Feb 2017	995	56%	44%
OpinionWay	18–20 Feb 2017	1,535	57%	43%
Ifop-Fiducial	16–20 Feb 2017	1,397	56%	44%
OpinionWay	17–19 Feb 2017	1,534	56%	44%
Ifop-Fiducial	14–17 Feb 2017	1,399	56%	44%
OpinionWay	14–16 Feb 2017	1,605	57%	43%
Ifop-Fiducial	13–16 Feb 2017	1,396	56.5%	43.5%
OpinionWay	13–15 Feb 2017	1,602	57%	43%
Ifop-Fiducial	12–15 Feb 2017	1,394	56%	44%
OpinionWay	12–14 Feb 2017	1,456	58%	42%
Ifop-Fiducial	10–14 Feb 2017	1,402	56.5%	43.5%
OpinionWay	11–13 Feb 2017	1,422	59%	41%
Ifop-Fiducial	9–13 Feb 2017	1,392	56%	44%
OpinionWay	10–12 Feb 2017	1,590	58%	42%
Ifop-Fiducial	7–10 Feb 2017	1,396	55%	45%
OpinionWay	7–9 Feb 2017	1,496	60%	40%
Ifop-Fiducial	6–9 Feb 2017	1,407	56%	44%
Elabe	7–8 Feb 2017	961	56%	44%
OpinionWay	6–8 Feb 2017	1,454	60%	40%
Ifop-Fiducial	5–8 Feb 2017	1,409	55%	45%
OpinionWay	5–7 Feb 2017	1,487	62%	38%
Ifop-Fiducial	3–7 Feb 2017	1,424	56%	44%
Elabe	4–6 Feb 2017	993	55%	45%
OpinionWay	4–6 Feb 2017	1,568	60%	40%
Ifop-Fiducial	2–6 Feb 2017	1,433	55%	45%
OpinionWay	3–5 Feb 2017	1,700	61%	39%
Ifop-Fiducial	31 Jan–3 Feb 2017	1,430	58%	42%
BVA	1–2 Feb 2017	475	60%	40%
Ifop-Fiducial	30 Jan–2 Feb 2017	1,414	59%	41%
Ifop-Fiducial	29 Jan–1 Feb 2017	1,409	60%	40%
Elabe	30–31 Jan 2017	993	59%	41%
Kantar Sofres	26–27 Jan 2017	600	60%	40%
Ipsos	20 Jan 2017	992	62%	38%
BVA	6–8 Jan 2017	714	63%	37%
Ifop-Fiducial	3–6 Jan 2017	1,860	64%	36%
BVA	2–4 Dec 2016	934	67%	33%
Ifop-Fiducial	28–30 Nov 2016	1,882	65%	35%
Elabe	28–29 Nov 2016	941	66%	34%
Kantar Sofres	28 Nov 2016	1,011	66%	34%
Harris Interactive	27 Nov 2016	6,093	67%	33%
Odoxa	25 Nov 2016	862	71%	29%
BVA	9–11 Sep 2016	912	61%	39%
Ifop-Fiducial	14–17 Jun 2016	1,858	60%	40%
BVA	10–12 Jun 2016	910	65%	35%
BVA	13–16 May 2016	927	65%	35%
BVA	15–17 Apr 2016	949	64%	36%
Ifop-Fiducial	12–14 Apr 2016	1,876	63%	37%
Ifop	3–4 Sep 2014	994	57%	43%

=== Macron–Fillon ===
Polling firm	Fieldwork date	Sample size	Macron EM	Fillon LR
Odoxa	21 Apr 2017	774	65%	35%
Elabe	19–20 Apr 2017	1,445	65%	35%
Harris Interactive	18–20 Apr 2017	962	66%	34%
BVA	18–19 Apr 2017	826	67%	33%
Harris Interactive	18–19 Apr 2017	2,812	68%	32%
Elabe	16–17 Apr 2017	1,438	65%	35%
Ipsos	16–17 Apr 2017	8,274	64%	36%
Kantar Sofres	14–17 Apr 2017	925	65%	35%
Le Terrain***	13–15 Apr 2017	642	67%	33%
BVA	12–14 Apr 2017	818	64%	36%
Ipsos	12–13 Apr 2017	927	64%	36%
Odoxa	12–13 Apr 2017	732	67%	33%
Harris Interactive	11–13 Apr 2017	904	70%	30%
Elabe	11–12 Apr 2017	1,010	65%	35%
Elabe	9–10 Apr 2017	1,002	65%	35%
Kantar Sofres	5–7 Apr 2017	855	66%	34%
Le Terrain***	23–27 Mar 2017	621	72%	28%
Ipsos	1–5 Mar 2017	10,854	66%	34%
Kantar Sofres	26–27 Jan 2017	600	58%	42%
Ipsos	20 Jan 2017	992	54%	46%
Ifop-Fiducial	3–6 Jan 2017	1,860	52%	48%

=== Mélenchon–Macron ===
Polling firm	Fieldwork date	Sample size	Mélenchon FI	Macron EM
Odoxa	21 Apr 2017	774	40%	60%
Elabe	19–20 Apr 2017	1,445	41%	59%
Harris Interactive	18–20 Apr 2017	962	41%	59%
BVA	18–19 Apr 2017	844	40%	60%
Harris Interactive	18–19 Apr 2017	2,812	40%	60%
Elabe	16–17 Apr 2017	1,438	41%	59%
Ipsos	16–17 Apr 2017	8,274	43%	57%
Kantar Sofres	14–17 Apr 2017	936	42%	58%
Le Terrain***	13–15 Apr 2017	642	42%	58%
BVA	12–14 Apr 2017	838	42%	58%
Ipsos	12–13 Apr 2017	927	45%	55%
Odoxa	12–13 Apr 2017	732	40%	60%
Harris Interactive	11–13 Apr 2017	904	42%	58%
Elabe	11–12 Apr 2017	1,010	46%	54%
Elabe	9–10 Apr 2017	1,002	45%	55%
Kantar Sofres	5–7 Apr 2017	785	47%	53%
Le Terrain***	23–27 Mar 2017	654	43%	57%

=== Mélenchon–Fillon ===
Polling firm	Fieldwork date	Sample size	Mélenchon FI	Fillon LR
Elabe	19–20 Apr 2017	1,445	56%	44%
Harris Interactive	18–20 Apr 2017	962	56%	44%
BVA	18–19 Apr 2017	851	58%	42%
Harris Interactive	18–19 Apr 2017	2,812	58%	42%
Elabe	16–17 Apr 2017	1,438	57%	43%
Ipsos	16–17 Apr 2017	8,274	58%	42%
Kantar Sofres	14–17 Apr 2017	980	57%	43%
Le Terrain***	13–15 Apr 2017	642	60%	40%
BVA	12–14 Apr 2017	847	58%	42%
Ipsos	12–13 Apr 2017	927	60%	40%
Elabe	11–12 Apr 2017	1,010	59%	41%
Elabe	9–10 Apr 2017	1,002	59%	41%
Le Terrain***	23–27 Mar 2017	667	63%	37%

=== Mélenchon–Le Pen ===
Polling firm	Fieldwork date	Sample size	Mélenchon FI	Le Pen FN
Odoxa	21 Apr 2017	774	54%	46%
Odoxa	20 Apr 2017	1,433	59%	41%
Elabe	19–20 Apr 2017	1,445	60%	40%
Harris Interactive	18–20 Apr 2017	962	61%	39%
BVA	18–19 Apr 2017	834	60%	40%
Harris Interactive	18–19 Apr 2017	2,812	60%	40%
Elabe	16–17 Apr 2017	1,438	58%	42%
Ipsos	16–17 Apr 2017	8,274	57%	43%
Kantar Sofres	14–17 Apr 2017	941	57%	43%
Le Terrain***	13–15 Apr 2017	642	64%	36%
BVA	12–14 Apr 2017	827	60%	40%
Ipsos	12–13 Apr 2017	927	60%	40%
Odoxa	12–13 Apr 2017	732	58%	42%
Harris Interactive	11–13 Apr 2017	904	64%	36%
Elabe	11–12 Apr 2017	1,010	63%	37%
Elabe	9–10 Apr 2017	1,002	61%	39%
Kantar Sofres	5–7 Apr 2017	914	57%	43%
Le Terrain***	23–27 Mar 2017	647	68%	32%

=== Valls–Le Pen ===
Polling firm	Fieldwork date	Sample size	Valls PS	Le Pen FN
Odoxa	29–30 Apr 2015	1,021	55%	45%
CSA	27–29 Jan 2015	951	60%	40%
Ifop	21–23 Jan 2015	983	61%	39%

=== Hollande–Le Pen ===
Polling firm	Fieldwork date	Sample size	Hollande PS	Le Pen FN
Ifop-Fiducial	17–20 Oct 2016	1,827	49%	51%
Odoxa	14–15 Apr 2016	949	47%	53%
Ifop-Fiducial	12–14 Apr 2016	1,876	47%	53%
Odoxa	14–15 Jan 2016	1,011	54%	46%
Harris Interactive	13 Dec 2015	1,020	60%	40%
Odoxa	29–30 Apr 2015	1,021	48%	52%
OpinionWay	15–16 Apr 2015	979	52%	48%
CSA	27–29 Jan 2015	951	51%	49%
Ifop	21–23 Jan 2015	983	55%	45%
Ifop	3–4 Sep 2014	994	46%	54%
OpinionWay	11–13 Apr 2014	988	54%	46%

=== Hollande–Fillon ===
Polling firm	Fieldwork date	Sample size	Hollande PS	Fillon LR
Ifop	3–4 Sep 2014	994	38%	62%

=== Juppé–Le Pen ===
Polling firm	Fieldwork date	Sample size	Juppé LR	Le Pen FN
Ifop-Fiducial	17–20 Oct 2016	1,827	68%	32%
BVA	14–16 Oct 2016	916	68%	32%
BVA	9–11 Sep 2016	912	66%	34%
BVA	8–10 Jul 2016	936	68%	32%
Ifop-Fiducial	14–17 Jun 2016	1,858	67%	33%
BVA	10–12 Jun 2016	910	70%	30%
BVA	13–16 May 2016	927	70%	30%
BVA	15–17 Apr 2016	949	70%	30%
Odoxa	14–15 Apr 2016	949	66%	34%
Ifop-Fiducial	12–14 Apr 2016	1,876	67%	33%
Odoxa	14–15 Jan 2016	1,011	70%	30%
TNS Sofres	14–15 Dec 2015	1,000	70%	30%
Harris Interactive	13 Dec 2015	1,020	71%	29%
Odoxa	21–22 May 2015	911	67%	33%
OpinionWay	15–16 Apr 2015	979	70%	30%
CSA	27–29 Jan 2015	951	62%	38%
Ifop	3–4 Sep 2014	994	64%	36%

=== Hollande–Juppé ===
Polling firm	Fieldwork date	Sample size	Hollande PS	Juppé LR
Odoxa	14–15 Jan 2016	1,011	30%	70%
Odoxa	21–22 May 2015	911	29%	71%
OpinionWay	15–16 Apr 2015	979	30%	70%
Ifop	21–23 Jan 2015	983	40%	60%
Ifop	3–4 Sep 2014	994	34%	66%

=== Macron–Juppé ===
Polling firm	Fieldwork date	Sample size	Macron DVG	Juppé LR
Odoxa	14–15 Jan 2016	1,011	39%	61%

=== Sarkozy–Le Pen ===
Polling firm	Fieldwork date	Sample size	Sarkozy LR	Le Pen FN
Ifop-Fiducial	17–20 Oct 2016	1,827	58%	42%
BVA	14–16 Oct 2016	916	58%	42%
BVA	9–11 Sep 2016	912	56%	44%
BVA	8–10 Jul 2016	936	58%	42%
Ifop-Fiducial	14–17 Jun 2016	1,858	57%	43%
BVA	10–12 Jun 2016	910	61%	39%
BVA	13–16 May 2016	927	56%	44%
BVA	15–17 Apr 2016	949	60%	40%
Odoxa	14–15 Apr 2016	949	55%	45%
Ifop-Fiducial	12–14 Apr 2016	1,876	58%	42%
Odoxa	14–15 Jan 2016	1,011	56%	44%
TNS Sofres	14–15 Dec 2015	1,000	64%	36%
Harris Interactive	13 Dec 2015	1,020	62%	38%
Odoxa	21–22 May 2015	911	59%	41%
Odoxa	29–30 Apr 2015	1,021	59%	41%
OpinionWay	15–16 Apr 2015	979	63%	37%
CSA	27–29 Jan 2015	951	57%	43%
Ifop	21–23 Jan 2015	983	60%	40%
Ifop	3–4 Sep 2014	994	60%	40%
OpinionWay	11–13 Apr 2014	988	60%	40%
CSA	26–28 Apr 2013	993	69%	31%

=== Hollande–Sarkozy ===
Polling firm	Fieldwork date	Sample size	Abs.	Hollande PS	Sarkozy LR
Odoxa	14–15 Jan 2016	1,011	–	46%	54%
Odoxa	21–22 May 2015	911	–	42%	58%
Odoxa	29–30 Apr 2015	1,021	–	40%	60%
OpinionWay	15–16 Apr 2015	979	–	40%	60%
Ifop	21–23 Jan 2015	983	–	43%	57%
Ifop	3–4 Sep 2014	994	–	39%	61%
OpinionWay	11–13 Apr 2014	988	–	39%	61%
CSA	26–28 Apr 2013	993	–	39%	61%
OpinionWay	16–17 Apr 2013	971	–	47%	53%
Ifop	9–12 Oct 2012	1,607	–	50%	50%
2012 election	6 May 2012	–	19.65%	51.64%	48.36%

=== Valls–Sarkozy ===
Polling firm	Fieldwork date	Sample size	Valls PS	Sarkozy LR
Odoxa	29–30 Apr 2015	1,021	48%	52%

=== Macron–Sarkozy ===
Polling firm	Fieldwork date	Sample size	Macron DVG	Sarkozy LR
Odoxa	14–15 Jan 2016	1,011	64%	36%

=== Le Maire–Le Pen ===
Polling firm	Fieldwork date	Sample size	Le Maire LR	Le Pen FN
BVA	9–11 Sep 2016	912	58%	42%
Ifop-Fiducial	14–17 Jun 2016	1,858	57%	43%
BVA	10–12 Jun 2016	910	63%	37%
BVA	13–16 May 2016	927	58%	42%
BVA	15–17 Apr 2016	949	61%	39%
Ifop-Fiducial	12–14 Apr 2016	1,876	60%	40%

== See also ==
- Opinion polling for the French legislative election, 2017
- Opinion polling for the French presidential election, 2002
- Opinion polling for the French presidential election, 2007
- Opinion polling for the French presidential election, 2012
