= Opinion polling for the 2012 French legislative election =

This page lists public opinion polls conducted for the 2012 French legislative elections, which were held in two rounds on 10 and 17 June 2012.

Unless otherwise noted, all polls listed below are compliant with the regulations of the national polling commission (Commission nationale des sondages) and utilize the quota method.

== Graphical summary ==
The averages in the graphs below were constructed using polls listed below conducted by the nine major French pollsters. The graphs are smoothed 14-day weighted moving averages, using only the most recent poll conducted by any given pollster within that range (each poll weighted based on recency).

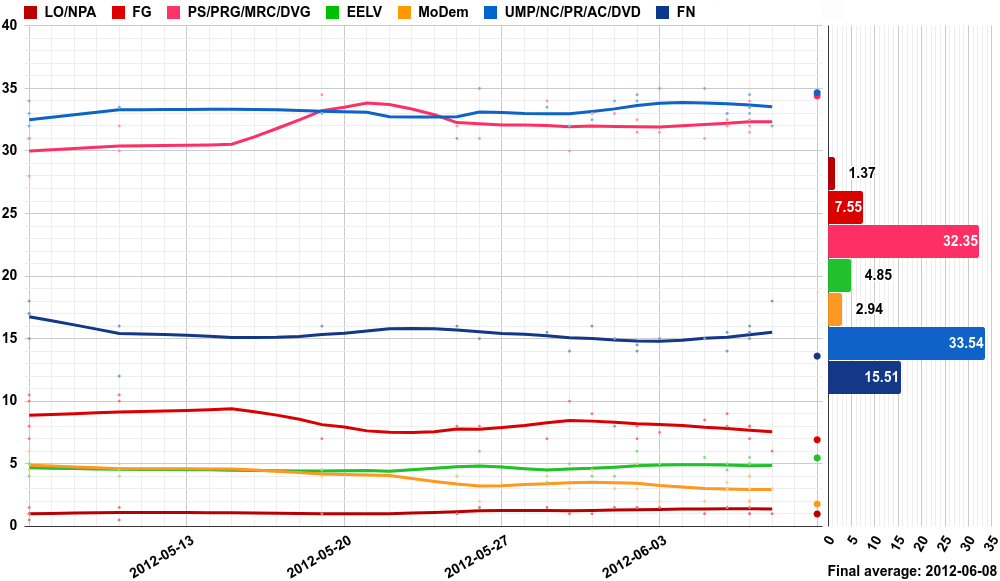

== First round ==
The comparison for the Left Front with 2007 is made against the French Communist Party and the New Centre against "presidential majority" candidates. Hunting, Fishing, Nature and Traditions and the Movement for France, which were counted individually in 2007, are included in the miscellaneous right total for that year, which would otherwise be 2.47%.

Polling firm	Fieldwork date	Sample size	Abs.	LO	NPA	FG	MRC	PS	PRG	DVG	EELV	AEI	ECO	MoDem	AC	PR	NC	UMP	DVD	DLR	FN	EXD	REG	DIV
2012 election	10 Jun 2012	–	42.78%	0.98% (EXG)		6.91%	(DVG)	29.35%	1.65%	3.40%	5.46%	(ECO)	0.96%	1.77%	0.60%	1.24%	2.20%	27.12%	3.51%	(DVD)	13.60%	0.19%	0.96%	0.52%
YouGov	3–8 Jun 2012	1,252	42%	1%		6%	39%					–	–	3%	–	–	32%			–	18%	–	–	1%
BVA	6–7 Jun 2012	1,020	–	1%	1%	8%	–	32.5%		–	4%	0.5%	–	4%	–	–	–	32.5%	–	1%	15.5%	–	–	–
Ipsos	6–7 Jun 2012	1,017	40%	1.5%		8%	31.5%				5%	–	–	2%	–	34.5%				–	15.5%	–	–	2%
OpinionWay	6–7 Jun 2012	1,791	39%	1%		8%	–	32%			5.5%	1%	–	2%	33.5%					–	16%	–	–	1%
Harris	5–7 Jun 2012	1,043	–	1%		7%	–	34%			5%	–	–	3%	–	–	–	33%		–	15%	–	–	2%
BVA	5–6 Jun 2012	1,182	–	1%	0.5%	9%	–	32%		–	4.5%	1%	–	3.5%	–	–	–	32%	–	1%	15.5%	–	–	–
CSA	5–6 Jun 2012	875	–	1%	0.5%	8%	32.5%			–	5%	–	–	3%	–	32.5%			–	0.5%	14%	–	–	3%
OpinionWay	4–5 Jun 2012	1,697	40%	1%		8.5%	–	31%			5.5%	1%	–	2%	35%					–	15%	–	–	1%
TNS Sofres	1–3 Jun 2012	1,000	–	1.5%		7.5%	–	31.5%			5%	–	–	2%	–	35%				–	15%	–	–	2.5%
Ipsos	1–2 Jun 2012	894	38%	1.5%		7%	32.5%				6%	–	–	3%	–	34%				–	14%	–	–	2%
LH2	1–2 Jun 2012	960	–	0.5%	1%	8%	–	30%	1.5%		5%	–	–	5%	–	–	1%	30.5%	3%	–	14.5%		–	–
Ifop-Fiducial	31 May–1 Jun 2012	874	–	1.5%		8%	–	33%			4%	–	–	3%	–	30.5%			3.5%	–	15%	0.5%	–	1%
BVA	30–31 May 2012	1,139	–	0.5%	0.5%	9%	–	33%		–	4%	<0.5%	–	4.5%	–	–	–	32%	–	0.5%	16%	–	–	–
CSA	29–30 May 2012	852	–	1%	<0.5%	10%	–	30%	–	–	5%	–	–	3%	–	–	–	31.5%	–	0.5%	14%	–	–	5%
Ifop	25–29 May 2012	971	–	0.5%	1%	7%	–	33%	1%	–	3.5%	–	1%	4%	–	1%		32%	–	0.5%	15.5%	–	–	–
Ipsos	25–26 May 2012	962	38%	1.5%		8%	31%				6%	–	–	2%	–	35%				–	15%	–	–	1.5%
OpinionWay	23–25 May 2012	1,836	38%	1%		8%	–	32%			4%	1%	–	4%	31%					–	16%	–	–	3%
Ifop-Fiducial	18–19 May 2012	860	–	0.5%	0.5%	7%	–	34.5%		–	4.5%	–	–	4%	–	32.5%			–	0.5%	16%	–	–	–
BVA	9–10 May 2012	1,147	–	<0.5%	0.5%	10.5%	–	30%		–	4.5%	<0.5%	–	5%	–	–	–	32.5%	–	1%	16%	–	–	–
CSA	9–10 May 2012	899	–	1%	0.5%	10%	–	32%	–	–	4%	–	–	4%	–	–	–	33%	–	0.5%	12%	–	–	3%
BVA	6 May 2012	857	–	0.5%		10.5%	–	35%				–	–	4%	–	–	–	33%	–	–	17%	–	–	–
CSA	6 May 2012	1,016	–	1%	0%	10%	–	31%	–	–	4%	–	–	6%	–	–	–	30%	–	1%	15%	–	–	2%
Harris	6 May 2012	1,086	–	1%		7%	–	26%	–	2%	5%	–	–	5%	–	–	–	32%	2%	–	17%	<0.5%	–	3%
Ifop-Fiducial	6 May 2012	1,968	–	0.5%	1%	8%	–	31%		–	5%	–	–	4.5%	–	1.5%		30%	–	0.5%	18%	–	–	–
2007 election	10 Jun 2007	–	39.58%	3.41% (EXG)		4.29%	(DVG)	24.73%	1.32%	1.97%	3.25%	–	0.80%	7.61%	–	(UMP)	2.37%	39.54%	5.65%	(DVD)	4.29%	0.39%	0.51%	1.03%

== Second round seat projections ==
Projections marked with an asterisk (*) were calculated based only on the first round results, not surveys before the second round.

The Ipsos survey conducted from 13 to 14 June consisted of 1,015 respondents in 157 constituencies with left-right duels, 775 respondents in 36 constituencies EELV-right duels, and 685 respondents in 27 constituencies in constituencies with a left-right-FN triangulaire.

The comparison for the Left Front with 2007 is made against the French Communist Party. Movement for France, which was counted individually in 2007, is included in the miscellaneous right total for that year, which would otherwise be 9 otherwise.

Polling firm	Fieldwork date	Sample size	Abs.	FG	MRC	PS	DVG	PRG	EELV	MoDem	AC	PR	NC	UMP	DVD	FN	EXD	REG	DIV
2012 election	17 Jun 2012	–	44.60%	10	(DVG)	280	22	12	17	2	2	6	12	194	15	2	1	2	0
BVA *	15 Jun 2012	–	–	9–14	303–325				12–18	1–2	–	219–247				1–5		–	–
CSA	13–14 Jun 2012	1,005	–	8–11	287–330				13–17	1–2	–	225–255				1–4		–	–
Harris	13–14 Jun 2012	1,067	–	8–10	287–325				11–17	0–2	202–263					0–3	–	–	0–4
Ipsos	13–14 Jun 2012	2,475	–	12–13	3–5	284–313		11–13	14–20	1–3	–	4–6	14–18	192–226		0–3	–	–	0–2
OpinionWay	13–14 Jun 2012	1,090	–	8–12	295–330				12–18	0–2	15–22			200–230		0–4	–	0–3	–
TNS Sofres	13–14 Jun 2012	1,000	–	10–12	–	300–330			14–18	0–2	–	210–240				0–3	–	–	2–3
Ifop*	13 Jun 2012	–	–	8–10	297–332				13–20	1–2	–	210–247				0–3	–	–	2–5
Ipsos	6–7 Jun 2012	1,017	–	23–26	2–4	243–285		12–15	12–16	0–3	–	4–7	13–16	214–262	–	0–3	–	–	–
OpinionWay	6–7 Jun 2012	1,791	–	18–22	2–4	290–320			16–22	0–2	209–247					0–4	–	–	–
Harris	5–7 Jun 2012	1,043	–	15–20	–	275–302		–	16–21	0–2	–	–	–	229–267		0–3	–	–	0
OpinionWay	4–5 Jun 2012	1,697	–	20–24	1–3	271–296			18–24	0–2	230–267					0–2	–	–	–
TNS Sofres	1–3 Jun 2012	1,000	–	13–18	–	280–310			12–17	0–2	–	235–265				0–5	–	–	–
Ipsos	1–2 Jun 2012	894	–	21–23	2–4	249–291		14–16	17–23	0–3	–	2–5	9–14	209–255	–	0–3	–	–	–
2007 election	17 Jun 2007	–	40.02%	15	(DVG)	186	15	7	4	3	–	(UMP)	22	313	10	0	0	1	1

== By constituency ==
=== First round ===
==== Ain's 5th ====
No fieldwork date(s) were given for this poll; the date listed below is the publication date.

Polling firm	Fieldwork date	Sample size	Abs.	Mylène Ferri FG	Josiane Exposito PS–EELV	Michel Perraud PR	Damien Abad UMP–NC	Patrick Sokolowski FN	Others
2012 election	10 Jun 2012	–	42.82%	7.32%	28.51%	9.49%	31.81%	17.99%	4.88%
CSA	1 Jun 2012	501	–	8%	27%	10%	28%	19%	8%

==== Aisne's 2nd ====
Polling firm	Fieldwork date	Sample size	Abs.	Guy Fontaine FG	Anne Ferreira PS	Paul Gironde MoDem	Xavier Bertrand UMP	Yannick Lejeune FN	Others
2012 election	10 Jun 2012	–	38.11%	4.74%	35.47%	1.39%	38.89%	16.29%	3.22%
OpinionWay	29–31 May 2012	552	–	6%	30%	2%	41%	17%	4%

==== Alpes-Maritimes's 1st ====
Polling firm	Fieldwork date	Sample size	Abs.	Robert Injey FG	Patrick Allemand PS	Éric Ciotti UMP	Jacques Peyrat ER–FN	Others
2012 election	10 Jun 2012	–	44.08%	4.58%	28.68%	43.89%	16.16%	6.70%
OpinionWay	24–26 May 2012	505	–	9%	25%	46%	12%	8%

==== Alpes-Maritimes's 2nd ====
Polling firm	Fieldwork date	Sample size	Abs.	Frédérique Cattaert FG	Fabrice Lachenmaier PRG	André Aschieri EELV–PS	Charles-Ange Ginésy UMP	Jean-Marc Degioanni FN	Others
2012 election	10 Jun 2012	–	40.99%	4.11%	7.04%	28.72%	35.78%	21.06%	3.29%
OpinionWay	1–2 Jun 2012	550	–	4%	1%	34%	40%	18%	3%

==== Alpes-Maritimes's 3rd ====
Polling firm	Fieldwork date	Sample size	Abs.	Roseline Grac FG	Christine Dorejo PS	Rudy Salles NC–UMP	Gaël Nofri FN	Others
2012 election	10 Jun 2012	–	45.19%	5.01%	23.01%	36.80%	22.75%	12.42%
OpinionWay	1–2 Jun 2012	555	–	6%	22%	40%	18%	14%

==== Alpes-Maritimes's 4th ====
Polling firm	Fieldwork date	Sample size	Abs.	Francis Tujague FG	Pascale Gérard PS	Jean-Claude Guibal UMP	Stéphane Cherki DVD	Lydia Schenardi FN	Others
2012 election	10 Jun 2012	–	42.42%	10.18%	19.79%	32.70%	9.63%	22.90%	4.80%
OpinionWay	29–31 May 2012	554	–	12%	18%	37%	7%	22%	4%

==== Aude's 2nd ====
Didier Codorniou was eligible to continue through the second round, but instead withdrew and supported Marie-Hélène Fabre after the first round.

The TNS Sofres poll tested Jean-Pierre Nadal as the candidate of the FN; Laure-Emmanuelle Philippe was ultimately invested by the party.

Polling firm	Fieldwork date	Sample size	Abs.	Jean-Paul Tournissa FG	Marie-Hélène Fabre PS	Didier Codorniou DVG	Michel Py UMP	Laure-Emmanuelle Philippe FN	Others
2012 election	10 Jun 2012	–	38.37%	5.91%	35.47%	21.89%	23.14%	18.80%	3.42%
Ifop-Fiducial	1–2 Jun 2012	604	–	9%	25%	20%	27%	17%	2%
TNS Sofres	11–12 May 2012	605	–	8%	23%	23%	30%	16%	0%
TNS Sofres	11–12 May 2012	605	–	–	28%	26%	30%	16%	0%

==== Aveyron's 1st ====
Polling firm	Fieldwork date	Sample size	Abs.	Guilhem Serieys FG	Monique Bultel-Herment PS	Stéphane Mazars PRG	Bruno Berardi EELV	Yves Censi UMP	Jean-Guillaume Remise FN	Others
2012 election	10 Jun 2012	–	34.00%	5.54%	28.27%	14.18%	3.02%	39.83%	8.16%	1.01%
Ifop	1–2 Jun 2012	602	–	8.5%	25.5%	13%	3%	40.5%	9%	0.5%

==== Bouches-du-Rhône's 5th ====
Polling firm	Fieldwork date	Sample size	Abs.	Frédéric Dutoit FG	Marie-Arlette Carlotti PS	Michèle Rubirola-Blanc EELV	Hélène Coulomb MoDem	Renaud Muselier UMP	Jean-Pierre Baumann FN	Others
2012 election	10 Jun 2012	–	41.16%	7.59%	34.43%	3.42%	1.64%	32.45%	16.27%	4.19%
Ifop-Fiducial	29–30 May 2012	504	–	8.5%	34%	3.5%	2.5%	36%	13.5%	2%

==== Bouches-du-Rhône's 9th ====
Polling firm	Fieldwork date	Sample size	Abs.	Pierre Mingaud FG	Christian Musumeci DVG	Denis Grandjean EELV–PS	Jean-Marie Orihuel MoDem	Bernard Deflesselles UMP	Joëlle Mélin FN	Others
2012 election	10 Jun 2012	–	40.99%	14.91%	3.86%	19.03%	1.38%	35.28%	22.25%	3.29%
CSA	23–24 May 2012	603	–	16%	5%	11%	6%	39%	19.5%	3.5%

==== Bouches-du-Rhône's 13th ====
René Raimondi was eligible to continue through the second round, but abandoned his candidacy to the benefit of Gaby Charroux.

The CSA poll tested José Rodriguez as the candidate of the FN; Béatrix Espallardo was ultimately invested by the party.

Polling firm	Fieldwork date	Sample size	Abs.	Gaby Charroux FG	René Raimondi PS	Paul Lombard DVG	Véronique Coulomb EELV	Michèle Vasserot UMP	Béatrix Espallardo FN	Others
2012 election	10 Jun 2012	–	40.31%	27.41%	24.82%	4.04%	1.99%	14.77%	21.69%	5.28%
CSA	2–3 Feb 2012	500	–	35%	23%	12%	5%	18%	7%	0%

==== Charente-Maritime's 1st ====
In the Ifop-Fiducial poll conducted in December 2011, no Europe Ecology – The Greens or National Front candidates were named, François Drageon was described as a miscellaneous right candidate, and Bruno Leal was tested as a candidate of the Democratic Movement.

Polling firm	Fieldwork date	Sample size	Abs.	Esther Memain FG	Ségolène Royal PS–PRG	Olivier Falorni DVG	Brigitte Desveaux EELV	Arnaud Jaulin MoDem	François Drageon PR	Sally Chadjaa UMP	Marie-Françoise de Lacoste-Lareymondie FN	Others
2012 election	10 Jun 2012	–	39.34%	3.40%	32.03%	28.91%	3.68%	1.79%	1.88%	19.47%	6.80%	2.02%
Ifop-Fiducial	2–4 Jun 2012	603	–	4.5%	36%	22%	3%	2.5%	2%	21.5%	7%	1.5%
Ifop-Fiducial	25–29 May 2012	604	–	3%	33%	26%	4%	3%	2.5%	19.5%	9%	0%
Ifop-Fiducial	1–3 Dec 2011	602	–	6%	23%	18%	9%	5.5%	5%	17%	5%	11.5%

==== Corse-du-Sud's 1st ====
Polling firm	Fieldwork date	Sample size	Abs.	Paul-Antoine Luciani FG	Simon Renucci CSD	Jean-Marc Cresp PR	Laurent Marcangeli UMP	José Risticoni FN	Romain Colonna FC	Paul-Mathieu Leonetti CL	Others
2012 election	10 Jun 2012	–	43.00%	7.57%	29.39%	4.83%	30.75%	10.27%	9.00%	6.63%	1.56%
Ifop-Fiducial	24–26 May 2012	502	–	9%	26%	2%	32%	11.5%	13%	4.5%	2%

==== Corse-du-Sud's 2nd ====
Polling firm	Fieldwork date	Sample size	Abs.	Dominique Bucchini FG	Paul-Marie Bartoli PRG–PS	Camille de Rocca Serra UMP	Bernard Angelini FN	Jean-Christophe Angelini FC	Paul Quastana CL	Others
2012 election	10 Jun 2012	–	39.01%	10.86%	16.81%	33.00%	9.83%	21.23%	8.04%	0.23%
Ifop-Fiducial	24–26 May 2012	502	–	14%	18%	33%	11%	20%	3.5%	0.5%

==== Haute-Corse's 1st ====
Polling firm	Fieldwork date	Sample size	Abs.	Michel Stefani FG	Jean Zuccarelli PRG–PS	Sauveur Gandolfi-Scheit UMP	Tony Cardi FN	Gilles Simeoni FC	Ghjuvan Filippu Antolini CL	Others
2012 election	10 Jun 2012	–	39.04%	7.14%	23.55%	31.19%	8.00%	24.73%	3.30%	2.08%
Ifop-Fiducial	24–26 May 2012	500	–	10.5%	22.5%	32%	9%	21.5%	4%	0.5%

==== Haute-Corse's 2nd ====
Polling firm	Fieldwork date	Sample size	Abs.	Marie-Jeanne Fedi FG	Paul Giacobbi PRG–PS	Stéphanie Grimaldi UMP	Estelle Massoni FN	Saveriu Luciani FC	Petru Antone Tomasi CL	Others
2012 election	10 Jun 2012	–	38.14%	5.80%	43.60%	24.78%	8.35%	10.79%	6.19%	0.49%
Ifop-Fiducial	24–26 May 2012	504	–	7.5%	32%	30%	10%	11%	9%	0.5%

==== Gard's 2nd ====
Polling firm	Fieldwork date	Sample size	Abs.	Danielle Floutier FG	Katy Guyot PS	Étienne Mourrut UMP	Gilbert Collard FN	Others
2012 election	10 Jun 2012	–	36.64%	5.18%	32.87%	23.89%	34.57%	3.48%
Ifop-Fiducial	4–5 Jun 2012	604	–	8%	29.5%	29.5%	29.5%	3.5%

==== Haute-Garonne's 3rd ====
After the first round, Alain Fillola, though eligible to continue to the second round, withdrew his candidacy.

Polling firm	Fieldwork date	Sample size	Abs.	Martine Croquette FG	Alain Fillola DVG	François Simon EELV–PS	Jean-Luc Moudenc UMP	Sandrine Cabioch FN	Others
2012 election	10 Jun 2012	–	37.59%	6.42%	21.36%	22.24%	35.14%	7.81%	7.02%
BVA	30 May–2 Jun 2012	611	–	10%	17%	22%	38%	7%	6%

==== Gironde's 2nd ====
Polling firm	Fieldwork date	Sample size	Abs.	Brigitte Comard FG	Michèle Delaunay PS	Marie-Claude Noël EELV	Nicolas Florian UMP	François Jay FN	Others
2012 election	10 Jun 2012	–	42.51%	7.14%	43.50%	6.24%	34.28%	5.77%	3.06%
Ifop-Fiducial	30–31 May 2012	604	–	8%	37%	7%	38%	6.5%	3.5%

==== Nord's 8th ====
In the Ifop poll conducted in May 2012, no National Front candidate was named.

Polling firm	Fieldwork date	Sample size	Abs.	Dominique Baert DVG	Slimane Tir EELV–PS	Salima Saa UMP	Samuel Lenclud FN	Others
2012 election	10 Jun 2012	–	55.66%	36.46%	21.40%	13.17%	20.65%	8.32%
Ifop	9–10 May 2012	503	–	17%	26%	18%	19%	20%

==== Pas-de-Calais's 11th ====
Polling firm	Fieldwork date	Sample size	Abs.	Jean-Luc Mélenchon FG	Philippe Kemel PS	Jean Urbaniak MoDem–UMP	Marine Le Pen FN	Others
2012 election	10 Jun 2012	–	42.50%	21.46%	23.72%	7.86%	42.26%	4.69%
OpinionWay	4–5 Jun 2012	561	–	24%	25%	15%	32%	4%
Ifop-Fiducial	2–4 Jun 2012	604	–	25%	21.5%	13%	37%	3.5%
Ifop-Fiducial	15–17 May 2012	602	–	29%	18%	16%	34%	3%

==== Pyrénées-Atlantiques's 2nd ====
Polling firm	Fieldwork date	Sample size	Abs.	Daniel Labouret FG	Nathalie Chabanne PS	Eurydice Bled EELV	François Bayrou MoDem	Éric Saubatte UMP	Jessica Bernadez FN	Others
2012 election	10 Jun 2012	–	37.20%	5.24%	34.90%	2.74%	23.63%	21.72%	9.32%	2.43%
Ifop-Fiducial	1–2 Jun 2012	605	–	6%	32%	3%	30%	19%	8.5%	1.5%
Ifop-Fiducial	22–23 May 2012	603	–	6.5%	31%	2.5%	29%	23%	7%	1%
OpinionWay	22–23 May 2012	530	–	8%	30%	3%	24%	23%	11%	1%

==== Pyrénées-Orientales's 1st ====
Polling firm	Fieldwork date	Sample size	Abs.	Jean Vila FG	Jacques Cresta DVG	Agnès Langevine EELV	Christine Espert MoDem	Daniel Mach UMP	Louis Aliot FN	Others
2012 election	10 Jun 2012	–	41.01%	16.35%	24.62%	1.73%	1.28%	28.19%	24.13%	3.69%
Ifop-Fiducial	29 May–2 Jun 2012	604	–	18%	20%	2.5%	3%	29.5%	23%	4%

==== Pyrénées-Orientales's 2nd ====
Irina Kortanek was eligible to continue through the second round, but instead withdrew and supported Fernand Siré after the first round.

Polling firm	Fieldwork date	Sample size	Abs.	Françoise Fiter FG	Toussainte Calabrèse PS	Marie-Paule Ricard EELV	Joseph Puig MoDem	Fernand Siré UMP	Irina Kortanek FN	Others
2012 election	10 Jun 2012	–	39.29%	6.58%	32.14%	1.77%	5.33%	27.70%	23.59%	2.88%
Ifop-Fiducial	29–30 May 2012	602	–	7%	31%	3%	5.5%	28%	20%	5.5%

==== Pyrénées-Orientales's 3rd ====
Polling firm	Fieldwork date	Sample size	Abs.	Daniel Borreill FG	Ségolène Neuville PS	Jean-Marc Panis EELV	Jean Castex UMP	Bruno Lemaire FN	Others
2012 election	10 Jun 2012	–	38.68%	7.23%	37.65%	2.84%	30.52%	18.67%	3.09%
Ifop-Fiducial	25–26 May 2012	606	–	12%	32%	4%	30%	19%	3%

==== Pyrénées-Orientales's 4th ====
Polling firm	Fieldwork date	Sample size	Abs.	Nicolas Garcia FG	Pierre Aylagas PS	Bruno Rouane EELV	Jacqueline Irles UMP	Marie-Thérèse Costa-Fesenbeck FN	Others
2012 election	10 Jun 2012	–	37.34%	12.55%	35.98%	2.54%	27.16%	18.35%	3.42%
Ifop-Fiducial	23–24 May 2012	603	–	14%	35%	2.5%	28.5%	19%	1%

==== Rhône's 1st ====
Polling firm	Fieldwork date	Sample size	Abs.	Claude Lanher FG	Philippe Meirieu EELV–PS	Thierry Braillard PRG	Florence Maury MoDem	Michel Havard UMP	André Morin FN	Others
2012 election	10 Jun 2012	–	44.88%	5.73%	18.36%	26.41%	2.52%	31.42%	10.35%	5.19%
OpinionWay	1–4 Jun 2012	553	–	8%	24%	21%	3%	30%	9%	5%
Ipsos	29–30 May 2012	605	–	8%	22%	20%	3%	33%	10%	4%

==== Rhône's 2nd ====
Polling firm	Fieldwork date	Sample size	Abs.	Anne Charmasson-Creus FG	Pierre-Alain Muet PS	Émeline Baume EELV	Fabienne Lévy PR–MoDem	Denis Broliquier DVD	Emmanuel Hamelin UMP	Blanche Chaussat FN	Others
2012 election	10 Jun 2012	–	41.78%	8.32%	37.15%	8.83%	2.56%	7.07%	25.43%	6.74%	3.91%
OpinionWay	1–4 Jun 2012	550	–	8%	35%	9%	5%	3%	32%	5%	3%
Ipsos	29–30 May 2012	608	–	10%	34%	7%	1%	9%	27%	5%	7%

==== Sarthe's 4th ====
Polling firm	Fieldwork date	Sample size	Abs.	Chantal Hersemeule FG	Stéphane Le Foll PS	Marc Joulaud UMP	Henri Delaune FN	Others
2012 election	10 Jun 2012	–	39.82%	4.51%	46.01%	31.67%	11.77%	6.05%
OpinionWay	25–26 May 2012	505	–	7%	38%	34%	13%	8%

==== Paris's 2nd ====
In the Ifop poll conducted in December 2011, no Left Front, Socialist Party, and Europe Ecology – The Greens candidates were named, Alain Lambert was tested as a candidate of the Democratic Movement, and Alain Dumait was tested as a candidate of the National Front.

Polling firm	Fieldwork date	Sample size	Abs.	Amar Bellal FG	Axel Kahn PS	Laurent Audouin EELV	Anne-Sophie Godfroy-Genin MoDem	François Fillon UMP	Rachida Dati UMP	Marc Le Tanneur FN	Others
2012 election	10 Jun 2012	–	36.00%	3.51%	33.88%	4.14%	2.68%	48.62%	–	3.93%	3.24%
Ifop	8–9 Dec 2011	504	–	3.5%	29%	8%	5%	39%	8%	4%	3.5%

==== Seine-et-Marne's 6th ====
Polling firm	Fieldwork date	Sample size	Abs.	Guillaume Quercy FG	Caroline Pinet EELV–PS	Jean-François Copé UMP	Marie-Christine Arnautu FN	Others
2012 election	10 Jun 2012	–	40.71%	6.55%	28.98%	45.14%	15.90%	3.43%
OpinionWay	4–5 Jun 2012	554	–	8%	29%	42%	16%	5%
BVA	30–31 May 2012	605	–	8.5%	26%	47%	14%	4.5%

==== Var's 3rd ====
Polling firm	Fieldwork date	Sample size	Abs.	Gilberte Mandon FG	Joël Canapa PRG–PS	Jean-Pierre Giran UMP	Bruno Gollnisch FN	Others
2012 election	10 Jun 2012	–	41.72%	4.26%	28.76%	37.89%	24.13%	4.96%
OpinionWay	26–29 May 2012	550	–	4%	22%	43%	23%	8%

==== Var's 4th ====
Polling firm	Fieldwork date	Sample size	Abs.	Jean-Marie Bernardi FG	Jean-Laurent Félizia EELV–PS	Jean-Michel Couve UMP	Vincent Morisse DVD	Jean-Louis Bouguereau FN	Others
2012 election	10 Jun 2012	–	42.59%	4.28%	21.78%	32.21%	14.16%	23.73%	3.85%
OpinionWay	1–2 Jun 2012	550	–	6%	20%	46%	6%	20%	2%

==== Var's 7th ====
Polling firm	Fieldwork date	Sample size	Abs.	Christine Sampéré FG	Ladislas Polski MRC–PS	Jean-Sébastien Vialatte UMP	Arthur Paecht DVD	Frédéric Boccaletti FN	Others
2012 election	10 Jun 2012	–	44.04%	4.54%	27.27%	34.37%	4.81%	23.24%	5.76%
OpinionWay	1–2 Jun 2012	553	–	8%	22%	40%	6%	15%	9%

==== Var's 8th ====
Polling firm	Fieldwork date	Sample size	Abs.	Joëlle Mecagni FG	Bernard Clap PS	Olivier Audibert-Troin UMP	Max Piselli DVD	Geneviève Blanc FN	Others
2012 election	10 Jun 2012	–	39.84%	4.70%	27.94%	30.76%	5.38%	23.27%	7.96%
OpinionWay	24–26 May 2012	505	–	8%	22%	30%	6%	22%	12%

==== Essonne's 4th ====
Polling firm	Fieldwork date	Sample size	Abs.	Dominique Bardy FG	Olivier Thomas PS	Jacques-Lucien Serna EELV	Gabrielle Nguyen MoDem	Nathalie Kosciusko-Morizet UMP	Brigitte Dupin FN	Others
2012 election	10 Jun 2012	–	38.11%	5.27%	36.29%	2.77%	1.86%	39.46%	11.39%	2.97%
Ifop-Fiducial	21–23 May 2012	603	–	7.5%	33%	3%	4.5%	41%	8%	3%

==== Hauts-de-Seine's 2nd ====
Polling firm	Fieldwork date	Sample size	Abs.	Jean-Michel Tarrin FG	Sébastien Pietrasanta PS	Laurent Gaillard EELV	Rama Yade PR–MoDem–NC	Manuel Aeschlimann UMP	Laurent Martin-Saint-Léon DLR	Guillaume L'Huillier FN	Others
2012 election	10 Jun 2012	–	40.36%	4.28%	37.56%	4.08%	13.84%	27.63%	2.67%	6.38%	3.56%
Ifop-Fiducial	29–31 May 2012	607	–	5%	36%	3.5%	19%	29%	1%	5%	1.5%

==== Hauts-de-Seine's 9th ====
The CSA poll in this constituency was commissioned by a group supporting Thierry Solère.

Polling firm	Fieldwork date	Sample size	Abs.	Isabelle Goïtia FG	Martine Even PS	Odile Joyeux EELV	Dorothée Pineau AC	Julien Marcel DVD	Thierry Solère UMP diss.	Claude Guéant UMP	Julien Dufour FN	Others
2012 election	10 Jun 2012	–	40.28%	2.07%	22.14%	2.96%	4.68%	2.98%	26.89%	30.41%	5.29%	2.58%
CSA	1–2 Jun 2012	604	–	4%	23%	2.5%	8%	2%	24%	29%	5%	2.5%
Ifop-Fiducial	14–15 May 2012	605	–	2%	25%	5%	7%	–	15%	41%	4%	1%

==== Réunion's 1st ====
Polling firm	Fieldwork date	Sample size	Abs.	Pierre Vergès PCR	Mickaël Nativel PS diss.	Ericka Bareigts PS	Jean-Pierre Marchau EELV	Nassimah Dindar MoDem	Nadia Ramassamy DVD	René-Paul Victoria UMP	Others
2012 election	10 Jun 2012	–	54.05%	2.48%	2.92%	39.89%	2.44%	21.41%	4.03%	20.61%	6.22%
Ipsos	22 May–2 Jun 2012	271	–	4%	3.5%	38%	6%	22%	3.5%	20%	3%

==== Réunion's 2nd ====
Polling firm	Fieldwork date	Sample size	Abs.	Jean-Yves Langenier PCR	Huguette Bello PLR	Patrick Loiseau FG	Laurence Lougnon PS	Nila Minatchy EELV	Sandra Sinimalé UMP	Élie Taïeb FN	Others
2012 election	10 Jun 2012	–	52.54%	14.31%	67.14%	0.73%	3.04%	2.12%	7.36%	1.71%	3.60%
Ipsos	22 May–2 Jun 2012	274	–	12%	67.5%	2%	7%	3.5%	5%	1.5%	1.5%

==== Réunion's 3rd ====
Polling firm	Fieldwork date	Sample size	Abs.	Yvan Dejean PCR	Jean-Jacques Vlody PS	Paulet Payet UMP diss.	André Thien Ah Koon DVD	Others
2012 election	10 Jun 2012	–	50.00%	6.04%	40.88%	11.97%	34.00%	7.11%
Ipsos	22 May–2 Jun 2012	289	–	5%	43%	16%	30%	6%

==== French residents overseas' 1st ====
No fieldwork date(s) were given for this poll; the date listed below is the publication date.

Polling firm	Fieldwork date	Sample size	Abs.	Céline Clément FG	Corinne Narassiguin PS–EELV	Carole Granade MoDem	Julien Balkany DVD	Émile Servan-Schreiber DVD	Antoine Treuille DVD	Frédéric Lefebvre UMP	Claire Savreux FN	Others
2012 election	3 Jun 2012	–	79.60%	2.85%	39.65%	4.94%	6.61%	6.69%	5.10%	22.08%	4.29%	7.79%
CSA	22 May 2012	1,717	–	3%	35%	4%	9%	7%	6%	19%	4%	13%

=== Second round ===
==== Ain's 5th ====
No fieldwork date(s) were given for this poll; the date listed below is the publication date.

Polling firm	Fieldwork date	Sample size	Abs.	Josiane Exposito PS–EELV	Michel Perraud PR	Damien Abad UMP–NC	Patrick Sokolowski FN
2012 election	17 Jun 2012	–	45.30%	43.60%	–	56.40%	–
CSA	1 Jun 2012	501	–	49%	–	51%	–
CSA	1 Jun 2012	501	–	62%	38%	–	–
CSA	1 Jun 2012	501	–	43%	–	39%	18%
CSA	1 Jun 2012	501	–	45%	26%	–	29%

==== Aisne's 2nd ====
Polling firm	Fieldwork date	Sample size	Abs.	Anne Ferreira PS	Xavier Bertrand UMP	Yannick Lejeune FN
2012 election	17 Jun 2012	–	37.23%	49.75%	50.25%	–
OpinionWay	29–31 May 2012	552	–	48%	52%	–
OpinionWay	29–31 May 2012	552	–	38%	44%	18%

==== Alpes-Maritimes's 1st ====
Polling firm	Fieldwork date	Sample size	Abs.	Patrick Allemand PS	Éric Ciotti UMP
2012 election	17 Jun 2012	–	47.36%	39.27%	60.73%
OpinionWay	24–26 May 2012	505	–	38%	62%

==== Alpes-Maritimes's 2nd ====
Polling firm	Fieldwork date	Sample size	Abs.	André Aschieri EELV–PS	Charles-Ange Ginésy UMP	Jean-Marc Degioanni FN
2012 election	17 Jun 2012	–	44.04%	46.71%	53.29%	–
OpinionWay	1–2 Jun 2012	550	–	45%	55%	–
OpinionWay	1–2 Jun 2012	550	–	42%	41%	17%

==== Alpes-Maritimes's 3rd ====
Polling firm	Fieldwork date	Sample size	Abs.	Christine Dorejo PS	Rudy Salles NC–UMP	Gaël Nofri FN
2012 election	17 Jun 2012	–	49.12%	41.27%	58.73%	–
OpinionWay	1–2 Jun 2012	555	–	38%	62%	–
OpinionWay	1–2 Jun 2012	555	–	34%	47%	19%

==== Alpes-Maritimes's 4th ====
Polling firm	Fieldwork date	Sample size	Abs.	Pascale Gérard PS	Jean-Claude Guibal UMP	Lydia Schenardi FN
2012 election	17 Jun 2012	–	50.28%	–	55.22%	44.78%
OpinionWay	29–31 May 2012	554	–	–	70%	30%
OpinionWay	29–31 May 2012	554	–	30%	48%	22%

==== Aude's 2nd ====
Polling firm	Fieldwork date	Sample size	Abs.	Marie-Hélène Fabre PS	Didier Codorniou DVG	Michel Py UMP	Laure-Emmanuelle Philippe FN
2012 election	17 Jun 2012	–	41.40%	56.83%	–	43.17%	–
Ifop-Fiducial	1–2 Jun 2012	604	–	55%	–	45%	–
Ifop-Fiducial	1–2 Jun 2012	604	–	49%	–	31%	20%
Ifop-Fiducial	1–2 Jun 2012	604	–	–	57%	43%	–
Ifop-Fiducial	1–2 Jun 2012	604	–	–	50%	32%	18%
TNS Sofres	11–12 May 2012	605	–	52%	–	48%	–
TNS Sofres	11–12 May 2012	605	–	30%	28%	42%	–

==== Aveyron's 1st ====
Polling firm	Fieldwork date	Sample size	Abs.	Monique Bultel-Herment PS	Yves Censi UMP
2012 election	17 Jun 2012	–	34.23%	49.33%	50.67%
Ifop	1–2 Jun 2012	602	–	49.5%	50.5%

==== Bouches-du-Rhône's 5th ====
Polling firm	Fieldwork date	Sample size	Abs.	Marie-Arlette Carlotti PS	Renaud Muselier UMP
2012 election	17 Jun 2012	–	41.42%	51.81%	48.19%
Ifop-Fiducial	29–30 May 2012	504	–	52%	48%

==== Charente-Maritime's 1st ====
Polling firm	Fieldwork date	Sample size	Abs.	Ségolène Royal PS–PRG	Olivier Falorni DVG	Sally Chadjaa UMP
2012 election	17 Jun 2012	–	35.95%	37.02%	62.98%	–
BVA	12–13 Jun 2012	606	–	45%	55%	–
Ifop-Fiducial	11–12 Jun 2012	604	–	42%	58%	–
Ifop-Fiducial	2–4 Jun 2012	603	–	51%	49%	–
Ifop-Fiducial	2–4 Jun 2012	603	–	43%	27%	30%
Ifop-Fiducial	2–4 Jun 2012	603	–	58%	–	42%
Ifop-Fiducial	1–3 Dec 2011	602	–	58%	–	42%

==== Corse-du-Sud's 1st ====
Polling firm	Fieldwork date	Sample size	Abs.	Simon Renucci CSD	Laurent Marcangeli UMP
2012 election	17 Jun 2012	–	39.57%	49.48%	50.52%
Ifop-Fiducial	24–26 May 2012	502	–	48.5%	51.5%

==== Corse-du-Sud's 2nd ====
Polling firm	Fieldwork date	Sample size	Abs.	Paul-Marie Bartoli PRG–PS	Camille de Rocca Serra UMP	Jean-Christophe Angelini FC
2012 election	17 Jun 2012	–	39.83%	–	53.09%	46.91%
Ifop-Fiducial	24–26 May 2012	502	–	–	50%	50%
Ifop-Fiducial	24–26 May 2012	502	–	31%	38%	31%

==== Haute-Corse's 1st ====
Polling firm	Fieldwork date	Sample size	Abs.	Jean Zuccarelli PRG–PS	Sauveur Gandolfi-Scheit UMP	Gilles Simeoni FC
2012 election	17 Jun 2012	–	34.43%	30.71%	38.07%	31.22%
Ifop-Fiducial	24–26 May 2012	500	–	34.5%	38.5%	27%
Ifop-Fiducial	24–26 May 2012	500	–	46%	54%	–

==== Haute-Corse's 2nd ====
Polling firm	Fieldwork date	Sample size	Abs.	Paul Giacobbi PRG–PS	Stéphanie Grimaldi UMP
2012 election	17 Jun 2012	–	40.22%	64.34%	35.66%
Ifop-Fiducial	24–26 May 2012	504	–	54%	46%

==== Gard's 2nd ====
Polling firm	Fieldwork date	Sample size	Abs.	Katy Guyot PS	Étienne Mourrut UMP	Gilbert Collard FN
2012 election	17 Jun 2012	–	34.52%	41.56%	15.63%	42.82%
Ifop-Fiducial	4–5 Jun 2012	604	–	37%	31%	32%

==== Haute-Garonne's 3rd ====
Polling firm	Fieldwork date	Sample size	Abs.	Alain Fillola DVG	François Simon EELV–PS	Jean-Luc Moudenc UMP
2012 election	17 Jun 2012	–	39.63%	–	49.59%	50.41%
BVA	30 May–2 Jun 2012	11	–	–	50.5%	49.5%
BVA	30 May–2 Jun 2012	11	–	53.5%	–	46.5%

==== Gironde's 2nd ====
Polling firm	Fieldwork date	Sample size	Abs.	Michèle Delaunay PS	Nicolas Florian UMP
2012 election	17 Jun 2012	–	45.93%	58.44%	41.56%
Ifop-Fiducial	30–31 May 2012	604	–	55%	45%

==== Nord's 8th ====
In the Ifop poll conducted in May 2012, no National Front candidate was named.

Polling firm	Fieldwork date	Sample size	Abs.	Dominique Baert DVG	Slimane Tir EELV–PS	Salima Saa UMP	Samuel Lenclud FN
2012 election	17 Jun 2012	–	59.35%	69.58%	30.42%	–	–
Ifop	9–10 May 2012	503	–	–	61%	39%	–
Ifop	9–10 May 2012	503	–	–	49%	29%	22%

==== Pas-de-Calais's 11th ====
Polling firm	Fieldwork date	Sample size	Abs.	Jean-Luc Mélenchon FG	Philippe Kemel PS	Jean Urbaniak MoDem–UMP	Marine Le Pen FN
2012 election	17 Jun 2012	–	40.85%	–	50.11%	–	49.89%
OpinionWay	4–5 Jun 2012	561	–	–	53%	–	47%
OpinionWay	4–5 Jun 2012	561	–	51%	–	–	49%
Ifop-Fiducial	2–4 Jun 2012	604	–	–	57%	–	43%
Ifop-Fiducial	2–4 Jun 2012	604	–	52%	–	–	48%
Ifop-Fiducial	15–17 May 2012	602	–	–	56%	–	44%
Ifop-Fiducial	15–17 May 2012	602	–	55%	–	–	45%
Ifop-Fiducial	15–17 May 2012	602	–	44%	–	20%	36%

==== Pyrénées-Atlantiques's 2nd ====
Polling firm	Fieldwork date	Sample size	Abs.	Nathalie Chabanne PS	François Bayrou MoDem	Éric Saubatte UMP
2012 election	17 Jun 2012	–	38.01%	42.78%	30.17%	27.04%
Ifop-Fiducial	1–2 Jun 2012	605	–	43%	33%	24%
Ifop-Fiducial	1–2 Jun 2012	605	–	50%	50%	–
Ifop-Fiducial	22–23 May 2012	603	–	41%	33%	26%
Ifop-Fiducial	22–23 May 2012	603	–	50.5%	49.5%	–
OpinionWay	22–23 May 2012	530	–	44%	28%	28%
OpinionWay	22–23 May 2012	530	–	55%	45%	–
OpinionWay	22–23 May 2012	530	–	60%	–	40%

==== Pyrénées-Orientales's 1st ====
Polling firm	Fieldwork date	Sample size	Abs.	Jean Vila FG	Jacques Cresta DVG	Daniel Mach UMP	Louis Aliot FN
2012 election	17 Jun 2012	–	39.76%	–	42.95%	33.82%	23.24%
Ifop-Fiducial	29 May–2 Jun 2012	604	–	–	41%	35%	24%
Ifop-Fiducial	29 May–2 Jun 2012	604	–	40%	–	36%	24%

==== Pyrénées-Orientales's 2nd ====
Polling firm	Fieldwork date	Sample size	Abs.	Toussainte Calabrèse PS	Fernand Siré UMP	Irina Kortanek FN
2012 election	17 Jun 2012	–	39.89%	49.51%	50.49%	–
Ifop-Fiducial	29–30 May 2012	602	–	50%	50%	–
Ifop-Fiducial	29–30 May 2012	602	–	42.5%	36.5%	21%

==== Pyrénées-Orientales's 3rd ====
Polling firm	Fieldwork date	Sample size	Abs.	Ségolène Neuville PS	Jean Castex UMP	Bruno Lemaire FN
2012 election	17 Jun 2012	–	37.81%	53.03%	46.97%	–
Ifop-Fiducial	25–26 May 2012	606	–	54%	46%	–
Ifop-Fiducial	25–26 May 2012	606	–	49%	32%	19%

==== Pyrénées-Orientales's 4th ====
Polling firm	Fieldwork date	Sample size	Abs.	Pierre Aylagas PS	Jacqueline Irles UMP	Marie-Thérèse Costa-Fesenbeck FN
2012 election	17 Jun 2012	–	38.27%	55.42%	44.58%	–
Ifop-Fiducial	23–24 May 2012	603	–	56%	44%	–
Ifop-Fiducial	23–24 May 2012	603	–	50%	33%	17%

==== Rhône's 1st ====
Polling firm	Fieldwork date	Sample size	Abs.	Philippe Meirieu EELV–PS	Thierry Braillard PRG	Michel Havard UMP
2012 election	17 Jun 2012	–	47.24%	–	53.78%	46.22%
OpinionWay	1–4 Jun 2012	553	–	–	54%	46%
OpinionWay	1–4 Jun 2012	553	–	52%	–	48%
Ipsos	29–30 May 2012	605	–	–	53%	47%
Ipsos	29–30 May 2012	605	–	53%	–	47%

==== Rhône's 2nd ====
Polling firm	Fieldwork date	Sample size	Abs.	Pierre-Alain Muet PS	Emmanuel Hamelin UMP
2012 election	17 Jun 2012	–	44.92%	58.15%	41.85%
OpinionWay	1–4 Jun 2012	550	–	55%	45%
Ipsos	29–30 May 2012	608	–	56%	44%

==== Sarthe's 4th ====
Polling firm	Fieldwork date	Sample size	Abs.	Stéphane Le Foll PS	Marc Joulaud UMP
2012 election	17 Jun 2012	–	42.74%	59.45%	40.55%
OpinionWay	25–26 May 2012	505	–	53%	47%

==== Seine-et-Marne's 6th ====
Polling firm	Fieldwork date	Sample size	Abs.	Caroline Pinet EELV–PS	Jean-François Copé UMP	Marie-Christine Arnautu FN
2012 election	17 Jun 2012	–	43.57%	40.47%	59.53%	–
OpinionWay	4–5 Jun 2012	554	–	45%	55%	–
OpinionWay	4–5 Jun 2012	554	–	40%	46%	14%
BVA	30–31 May 2012	605	–	40%	60%	–
BVA	30–31 May 2012	605	–	38%	48%	14%

==== Var's 3rd ====
Polling firm	Fieldwork date	Sample size	Abs.	Joël Canapa PRG–PS	Jean-Pierre Giran UMP	Bruno Gollnisch FN
2012 election	17 Jun 2012	–	41.68%	34.91%	43.41%	21.67%
OpinionWay	26–29 May 2012	550	–	29%	47%	24%

==== Var's 4th ====
Polling firm	Fieldwork date	Sample size	Abs.	Jean-Laurent Félizia EELV–PS	Jean-Michel Couve UMP	Jean-Louis Bouguereau FN
2012 election	17 Jun 2012	–	49.22%	–	56.17%	43.83%
OpinionWay	1–2 Jun 2012	550	–	26%	57%	17%

==== Var's 7th ====
Polling firm	Fieldwork date	Sample size	Abs.	Ladislas Polski MRC–PS	Jean-Sébastien Vialatte UMP	Frédéric Boccaletti FN
2012 election	17 Jun 2012	–	42.98%	35.10%	41.65%	23.25%
OpinionWay	1–2 Jun 2012	553	–	34%	49%	17%
OpinionWay	1–2 Jun 2012	553	–	38%	62%	–

==== Var's 8th ====
Polling firm	Fieldwork date	Sample size	Abs.	Bernard Clap PS	Olivier Audibert-Troin UMP	Geneviève Blanc FN
2012 election	17 Jun 2012	–	39.57%	37.01%	40.53%	22.45%
OpinionWay	24–26 May 2012	505	–	36%	39%	25%

==== Vaucluse's 3rd ====
Polling firm	Fieldwork date	Sample size	Abs.	Catherine Arkilovitch PS	Jean-Michel Ferrand UMP	Marion Maréchal-Le Pen FN
2012 election	17 Jun 2012	–	35.56%	22.08%	35.82%	42.09%
BVA	12–13 Jun 2012	606	–	29%	34.5%	36.5%
BVA	12–13 Jun 2012	606	–	–	58.5%	41.5%

==== Essonne's 4th ====
Polling firm	Fieldwork date	Sample size	Abs.	Olivier Thomas PS	Nathalie Kosciusko-Morizet UMP
2012 election	17 Jun 2012	–	36.79%	48.52%	51.48%
Ifop-Fiducial	12–13 Jun 2012	604	–	48.5%	51.5%
Ifop-Fiducial	21–23 May 2012	603	–	50%	50%

==== Hauts-de-Seine's 2nd ====
Polling firm	Fieldwork date	Sample size	Abs.	Sébastien Pietrasanta PS	Rama Yade PR–MoDem–NC	Manuel Aeschlimann UMP
2012 election	17 Jun 2012	–	42.21%	53.53%	–	46.47%
Ifop-Fiducial	29–31 May 2012	607	–	54%	–	46%
Ifop-Fiducial	29–31 May 2012	607	–	48%	18%	34%

==== Hauts-de-Seine's 9th ====
The CSA poll in this constituency was commissioned by a group supporting Thierry Solère.

Polling firm	Fieldwork date	Sample size	Abs.	Martine Even PS	Thierry Solère UMP diss.	Claude Guéant UMP
2012 election	17 Jun 2012	–	41.14%	22.24%	39.35%	38.41%
CSA	1–2 Jun 2012	604	–	32%	31%	37%
CSA	1–2 Jun 2012	604	–	–	55%	45%
CSA	1–2 Jun 2012	604	–	42%	–	58%
CSA	1–2 Jun 2012	604	–	35%	65%	–
Ifop-Fiducial	14–15 May 2012	605	–	43%	–	57%

== See also ==
- Opinion polling for the French presidential election, 2012
- Opinion polling for the French legislative election, 2017
- Opinion polling for the French legislative election, 2007
