= Results of the 2024 French legislative election in Var =

Following the first round of the 2024 French legislative election on 30 June 2024, runoff elections in each constituency where no candidate received a vote share greater than 50 percent were scheduled for 7 July. Candidates permitted to stand in the runoff elections needed to either come in first or second place in the first round or achieve more than 12.5 percent of the votes of the entire electorate (as opposed to 12.5 percent of the vote share due to low turnout).

== Var ==
=== 1st constituency ===
Candidate	Party or alliance		First round		Second round	
Candidate	Party or alliance		Votes	%	Votes	%
Sébastien Soulé	National Rally		19,233	42.28	20,622	47.15
Yannick Chenevard	Ensemble	Renaissance	14,270	31.37	23,114	52.85
Eric Habouzit	New Popular Front	La France Insoumise	10,182	22.38		
Guillaume Tchakmakdjian	Reconquête		1,197	2.63		
Marie-Renée Balty	Far-left	Lutte Ouvrière	610	1.34		
Total			45,492	100.00	43,736	100.00
Valid votes			45,492	97.52	43,736	96.58
Invalid votes			286	0.61	363	0.80
Blank votes			869	1.86	1,184	2.61
Total votes			46,647	100.00	45,283	100.00
Registered voters/turnout			71,099	65.61	71,123	63.67

=== 2nd constituency ===
Candidate	Party or alliance		Votes	%
Laure Lavalette	National Rally		30,551	50.81
Josy Chambon	Ensemble	Horizons	13,061	21.72
Isaline Cornil	New Popular Front	La France Insoumise	11,613	19.31
Olivier Lesage	Ecologists	Miscellaneous centre	2,500	4.16
Julia Bonnefoy	Reconquête		1,506	2.50
Jean-Michel Ghiotto	Far-left	Lutte Ouvrière	493	0.82
Florian Fimbel	Independent		405	0.67
Total			60,129	100.00
Valid votes			60,129	97.60
Invalid votes			436	0.71
Blank votes			1,042	1.69
Total votes			61,607	100.00
Registered voters/turnout			92,819	66.37

=== 3rd constituency ===
Candidate	Party or alliance		First round		Second round	
Candidate	Party or alliance		Votes	%	Votes	%
Stéphane Rambaud	National Rally		32,343	46.51	35,730	53.11
Isabelle Monfort	Ensemble	Horizons	14,057	20.21	31,543	46.89
Julia Peironet-Bremond	New Popular Front	Socialist Party	12,839	18.46		
Julien Savelli	The Republicans		6,117	8.80		
Charles Malot	Ecologists	Miscellaneous centre	1,574	2.26		
Odile Judice	Reconquête		1,369	1.97		
Delphine Rolland	Regionalists	Independent	531	0.76		
Alexis Dominiak	Ecologists	Independent	455	0.65		
Pierre Deidon	Far-left	Lutte Ouvrière	259	0.37		
Total			69,544	100.00	67,273	100.00
Valid votes			69,544	97.94	67,273	96.10
Invalid votes			479	0.67	709	1.01
Blank votes			981	1.38	2,021	2.89
Total votes			71,004	100.00	70,003	100.00
Registered voters/turnout			103,272	68.75	103,283	67.78

=== 4th constituency ===
Candidate	Party or alliance		Votes	%
Philippe Lottiaux	National Rally		40,631	56.11
Sereine Mauborgne	Ensemble	Renaissance	18,994	26.23
Sabine Cristofani-Viglione	New Popular Front	La France Insoumise	9,416	13.00
Guillaume Robaa	Ecologists	Miscellaneous centre	2,697	3.72
Pascale Morel	Far-left	Lutte Ouvrière	677	0.93
Total			72,415	100.00
Valid votes			72,415	97.36
Invalid votes			747	1.00
Blank votes			1,219	1.64
Total votes			74,381	100.00
Registered voters/turnout			113,944	65.28

=== 5th constituency ===
Candidate	Party or alliance		Votes	%
Julie Lechanteux	National Rally		34,496	51.51
Philippe Michel Kleisbauer	Ensemble	Democratic Movement	14,890	22.23
Aurelien Lacour	New Popular Front	La France Insoumise	8,450	12.62
Danièle Lombard	The Republicans		5,304	7.92
Hélène Charlotte de Busschère	Ecologists	Miscellaneous centre	2,058	3.07
Vincent Thiery	Reconquête		1,429	2.13
Rémi Kranzer	Far-left	Lutte Ouvrière	342	0.51
Total			66,969	100.00
Valid votes			66,969	98.04
Invalid votes			529	0.77
Blank votes			812	1.19
Total votes			68,310	100.00
Registered voters/turnout			102,351	66.74

=== 6th constituency ===
Candidate	Party or alliance		Votes	%
Frank Giletti	National Rally		45,882	53.51
Fabrice Albert	Ensemble	Union of Democrats and Independents	15,451	18.02
Sylvie Vinceneux	New Popular Front	Communist Party	14,683	17.12
Frédéric Herbaut	The Republicans		5,527	6.45
Didier Cade	Regionalists	Independent	1,968	2.30
Sandra Cahoreau	Reconquête		1,508	1.76
Louis Gueyrard	Far-left	Lutte Ouvrière	726	0.85
Total			85,745	100.00
Valid votes			85,745	97.47
Invalid votes			610	0.69
Blank votes			1,614	1.83
Total votes			87,969	100.00
Registered voters/turnout			128,858	68.27

=== 7th constituency ===
Candidate	Party or alliance		First round		Second round	
Candidate	Party or alliance		Votes	%	Votes	%
Frédéric Boccaletti	National Rally		32,748	48.30	36,043	55.81
Cécile Muschotti	Ensemble	Renaissance	12,567	18.53	28,544	44.19
Claudie Cartereau	New Popular Front	The Ecologists	12,166	17.94		
Sandra Kuntz	The Republicans		5,129	7.56		
Sébastien Gioia	Miscellaneous centre	Independent	1,870	2.76		
Laurile Koscielski	Ecologists	Miscellaneous centre	1,169	1.72		
Mathieu Reho	Reconquête		887	1.31		
Marie-Ève Perru	Ecologists	Independents	819	1.21		
Patrice Ciuti	Far-left	Lutte Ouvrière	381	0.56		
Christèle Gueniot-Desmazures	Sovereigntist right	Debout la France	71	0.10		
Total			67,807	100.00	64,587	100.00
Valid votes			67,807	98.14	64,587	95.44
Invalid votes			364	0.53	694	1.03
Blank votes			921	1.33	2,389	3.53
Total votes			69,092	100.00	67,670	100.00
Registered voters/turnout			103,766	66.58	703,771	9.62

=== 8th constituency ===
Candidate	Party or alliance		Votes	%
Philippe Schreck	National Rally		38,433	53.55
Sarah Breffy	New Popular Front	Socialist Party	14,420	20.09
Rayann Mouslim	Ensemble	Renaissance	11,368	15.84
Frank Panizzi	The Republicans		6,639	9.25
Ludovic Martin	Far-left	Lutte Ouvrière	915	1.27
Francis Combe	Independent		0	0.00
Total			71,775	100.00
Valid votes			71,775	97.06
Invalid votes			667	0.90
Blank votes			1,509	2.04
Total votes			73,951	100.00
Registered voters/turnout			110,139	67.14
