= Bouches-du-Rhône's 9th constituency =

Constituency of the National Assembly of France

9th constituency of Bouches-du-Rhône
- inline Constituency of the National Assembly of France

- Constituency in Bouches-du-Rhône Department (white area is the Étang de Berre lagoon)

- Bouches-du-Rhône in France
- Deputy: Joëlle Mélin; RN
- Department: Bouches-du-Rhône

The 9th constituency of Bouches-du-Rhône is a French legislative constituency in Bouches-du-Rhône.

== Deputies ==
Election	Member	Party
2002	Bernard Deflesselles	UMP
2007	Bernard Deflesselles	UMP
2012	Bernard Deflesselles	UMP
2017	Bernard Deflesselles	LR
2022	Joëlle Mélin	RN
2024	Joëlle Mélin	RN

== Elections ==
=== 2024 ===
Candidate	Party	Alliance	First round			Second round		
Candidate	Party	Alliance	Votes	%	+/–	Votes	%	+/–
Joëlle Mélin	RN		30,188	45.20	+20.38	36,052	58.04	-0.60
Bernard Ougourlou-Oglou	PS	NFP	15,867	23.76	+2.20	26,066	41.96	+0.60
Bertrand Mas-Fraissinet	RE	Ensemble	12,465	18.66	+1.86			
Aurélien Michel	LR	UDC	5,128	7.68	-7.89			
Boualam Aksil	EAC		1,790	2.68	new			
Robert Santunione	REC		979	1.47	-4.77			
Jean-Marie Clorec	LO		319	0.48	-0.12			
Isabelle Mazzoni	DIV		50	0.07	new			
Votes			66,786	100.00		62,118	100.00	
Valid votes			66,786	97.91	-0.35	62,118	92.33	+3.05
Blank votes			985	1.44	+0.17	4,073	6.05	-2.35
Null votes			438	0.64	+0.17	1,090	1.62	-0.71
Turnout			68,209	67.25	+21.54	67,281	66.32	+21.37
Abstentions			33,224	32.75	-21.54	34,168	33.68	-21.37
Registered voters			101,433			101,449		
Result			RN HOLD					

=== 2022 ===
Legislative Election 2022: Bouches-du-Rhône's 9th constituency
Party	Candidate	Votes	%	±%
RN	Joëlle Mélin	11,256	24.82	+6.47
LFI (NUPÉS)	Lucas Trottmann	9,776	21.56	-7.44
LREM (Ensemble)	Bertand Mas-Fraissinet	9,306	20.52	−10.22
LR (UDC)	Roland Giberti	7,061	15.57	−8.20
REC	Laurence Leguem	2,828	6.24	N/A
DVD	Giovanni Schipani	1,267	2.79	N/A
DVE	Simon Lachique	989	2.18	N/A
Others	N/A	2,864		
Turnout		46,149	45.71	−1.07
2nd round result
RN	Joëlle Mélin	23,757	58.64	N/A
LFI (NUPÉS)	Lucas Trottmann	16,756	41.36	N/A
Turnout		40,518	44.95	+4.63
RN gain from LR				

=== 2017 ===
Candidate	Label	First round		Second round	
Candidate	Label	Votes	%	Votes	%
Sylvie Brunet	MoDem	13,655	30.74	17,333	49.23
Bernard Deflesselles	LR	10,558	23.77	17,875	50.77
Hervé Itrac	FN	8,153	18.35		
Sylvie Pille-Lesou	FI	6,918	15.57		
Raymond Lloret	DVG	904	2.03		
Stéphanie Harkane	PS	812	1.83		
Nicolas Lapeyre	ECO	709	1.60		
Christian Musumeci	DIV	507	1.14		
Colette Gereux	DLF	491	1.11		
Christophe Amouroux	DIV	415	0.93		
François Otchakovsky-Laurens	EXG	334	0.75		
Élisabeth Lalesart	EXD	304	0.68		
Patricia Pawlak	PRG	227	0.51		
Boualam Aksil	ECO	223	0.50		
Élodie Sery	DIV	215	0.48		
Votes		44,425	100.00	35,208	100.00
Valid votes		44,425	97.95	35,208	90.06
Blank votes		648	1.43	2,716	6.95
Null votes		280	0.62	1,169	2.99
Turnout		45,353	46.78	39,093	40.32
Abstentions		51,601	53.22	57,864	59.68
Registered voters		96,954		96,957	
Source: Ministry of the Interior

=== 2012 ===
Summary of the 10 June and 17 June 2012 French legislative election in Bouches-du-Rhône’s 9th Constituency
Candidate	Party		1st round		2nd round	
Candidate	Party		Votes	%	Votes	%
Bernard Deflesselles	Union for a Popular Movement	UMP	19,030	35.28%	25,001	62.56%
Joëlle Melin	Front National	FN	12,003	22.25%	14,963	37.44%
Denis Grandjean	Europe Ecology – The Greens	EELV	10,268	19.03%		
Pierre Mingaud	Left Front	FG	8,043	%		
Christian Musumeci	Miscellaneous Left	DVG	2,083	3.86%		
Michèle Lesbrot	Ecologist	ECO	854	1.58%		
Jean-Marie Orihuel		CEN	746	1.38%		
Stéphanie Poggi	Other	AUT	354	0.66%		
Colette Gereux-Beltra	Miscellaneous Right	DVD	215	0.40%		
Claude Diharçabal	Far Left	EXG	199	0.37%		
François Otchakovsky-Laurens	Far Left	EXG	151	0.28%		
Serge Paloyan	Other	AUT	0	0.00%		
Total			53,946	100%	39,964	100%
Registered voters			92,601		92,600	
Blank/Void ballots			699	1.28%	5,896	12.86%
Turnout			54,645	59.01%	45,860	49.52%
Abstentions			37,956	40.99%	46,740	50.48%
Result					UMP HOLD	

=== 2007 ===
Results of the 10 June and 17 June 2007 French legislative election in Bouches-du-Rhône’s 9th Constituency
Party	Candidate	Votes	%	±%
UMP	Bernard Deflesselles	27,223	51.83	
DVG	Béatrice Negrier	6,684	13.07	
PCF	Patrick Candela	5,437	10.35	
MoDem	Mireille Benedetti	4,275	8.14	
FN	Joëlle Melin	3,506	6.68	
LV	Jean-Yves Petit	1,101	2.10	
Far left	Emmanuelle Johsua	958	1.82	
DVG	Pierre Rodeville	536	1.02	
DVE	Daniel Sebbah	492	0.94	
CPNT	Robert Meynard	395	0.75	
DVE	Christian Lartaud	359	0.68	
Far left	Jean-Pierre Messemanne	359	0.68	
Independent	Serge Bonifay	297	0.57	
Far right	Alain Fourestier	236	0.45	
DVD	Marc Ivaldi	228	0.43	
DVD	Christian Musumeci	145	0.28	
DVD	Hélène Faure Lequien	110	0.21	
Majority		20,539	38.76	
Turnout		53,401	59.67	
UMP hold		Swing		

=== 2002 ===
Legislative Election 2002: Bouches-du-Rhône's 9th constituency
Party	Candidate	Votes	%	±%
UMP	Bernard Deflesselles	21,199	40.45	
FN	Joëlle Melin	9,940	18.97	
PCF	Rosy Sanna	8,718	16.63	
PS	Stephanie Harkane	7,749	14.78	
Others	N/A	4,806		
Turnout		53,436	63.95	
2nd round result
UMP	Bernard Deflesselles	29,158	73.25	
FN	Joëlle Melin	10,646	26.75	
Turnout		45,230	54.13	
UMP gain from PCF				

=== 1997 ===
Legislative Election 1997: Bouches-du-Rhône's 9th constituency
Party	Candidate	Votes	%	±%
PCF	Jean Tardito	16,202	32.03	
UDF	Bernard Deflesselles	13,295	26.28	
FN	Joëlle Melin	11,452	22.64	
PS	Stéphanie Harkane	5,148	10.18	
DVD	Joseph Careghi	1,356	2.68	
LV	Françoise Contat	1,336	2.64	
GE	Patrick Sereno	1,136	2.25	
Others	N/A	663		
Turnout		52,463	68.15	
2nd round result
PCF	Jean Tardito	24,427	44.58	
UDF	Bernard Deflesselles	20,117	36.71	
FN	Joëlle Melin	10,252	18.71	
Turnout		56,467	73.36	
PCF hold				
