= Var's 4th constituency =

Constituency of the National Assembly of France

4th constituency of Var
- inline Constituency of the National Assembly of France

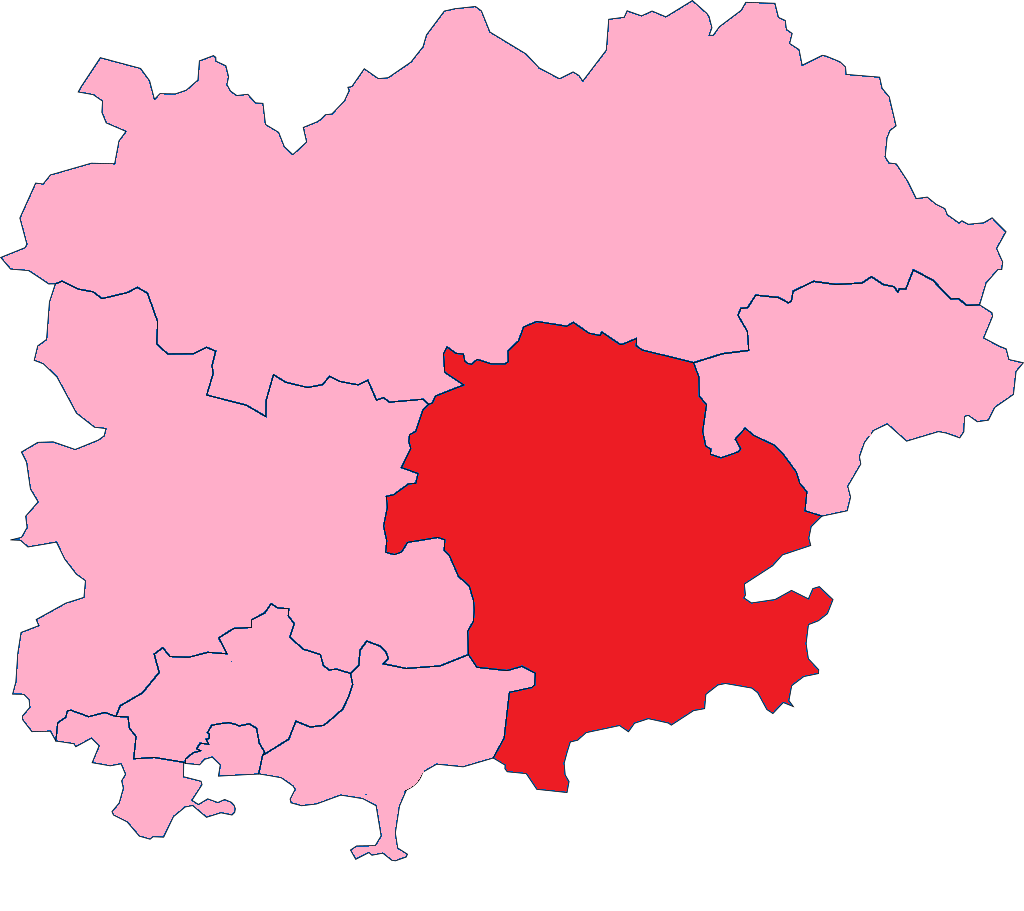
- Var's 4th constituency shown within Var
- Deputy: Philippe Lottiaux; RN
- Department: Var
- Cantons: Besse-sur-Issole, Collobrières, Grimaud, Lorgues, Le Luc, Saint-Tropez
- Registered voters: 106,143

The 4th constituency of Var (French: Quatrième circonscription du Var) is a French legislative constituency in the Var department. Like the other 576 French constituencies, it elects one deputy using the two-round system, with a runoff if no candidate receives over 50% of the vote in the first round.

== Description ==
The 4th constituency of Var lies to the east of Toulon along the coast.

Between 1998 and 2017 the seat continually elected centre-right deputy Jean-Michel Couve to the National Assembly.

== Assembly Members ==
Election	Member	Party
1988	Jean-Michel Couve	RPR
1993	Jean-Michel Couve	RPR
1997	Jean-Michel Couve	RPR
2002	Jean-Michel Couve	UMP
2007	Jean-Michel Couve	UMP
2012	Jean-Michel Couve	UMP
2017	Sereine Mauborgne	LREM
2022	Philippe Lottiaux	RN

== Election results ==
=== 2024 ===
Legislative Election 2024: Var's 4th constituency
Party	Candidate	Votes	%	±%
LFI (NFP)	Sabine Cristofani-Viglione	9,416	13.00	+0.13
RE (Ensemble)	Sereine Mauborgne	18,994	26.23	+21.48
RN	Philippe Lottiaux	40,631	56.11	+31.37
ÉAC	Guillaume Robaa	2,697	3.72	n/a
LO	Pascale Morel	677	0.93	n/a
Turnout		72,415	97.36	+50.70
Registered electors		113,944		
RN hold				

=== 2022 ===
Legislative Election 2022: Var's 4th constituency
Party	Candidate	Votes	%	±%
LREM (Ensemble)	Sereine Mauborgne	14,735	28.51	-3.79
RN	Philippe Lottiaux	12,784	24.74	−0.02
REC	Eric Zemmour	11,983	23.19	N/A
LFI (NUPÉS)	Sabine Cristofani-Viglione	6,649	12.87	+0.88
LR (UDC)	Marie-Christine Hamel	2,454	4.75	−13.12
DIV	Chantal Sarrut	1,205	2.33	
Others	N/A	1,671	3.62	N/A
Turnout		51,681	46.66	+3.87
2nd round result
RN	Philippe Lottiaux	25,581	53.65	+8.30
LREM (Ensemble)	Sereine Mauborgne	22,098	46.35	−8.30
Turnout		47,679	44.89	+7.89
RN gain from LREM				

=== 2017 ===
Legislative Election 2017: Var's 4th constituency
Party	Candidate	Votes	%	±%
LREM	Sereine Mauborgne	14,671	32.30	
FN	Philippe Lottiaux	11,245	24.76	
LR	Françoise Dumont	8,115	17.87	
LFI	Eric Habouzit	3,337	7.35	
DVD	Annick Napoleon	2,809	6.18	
EELV	Jean-Laurent Felizia	1,484	3.27	
Others	N/A	3,756		
Turnout		45,417	42.79	
2nd round result
LREM	Sereine Mauborgne	21,460	54.65	
FN	Philippe Lottiaux	17,808	45.35	
Turnout		39,268	37.00	
LREM gain from LR				

=== 2012 ===
Legislative Election 2012: Var's 4th constituency
Party	Candidate	Votes	%	±%
UMP	Jean-Michel Couve	18,117	32.21	
FN	Jean-Louis Bouguereau	13,347	23.73	
EELV	Jean-Laurent Felizia	12,250	21.78	
DVD	Vincent Morisse	7,967	14.16	
FG	Jean-Marie Bernardi	2,409	4.28	
Others	N/A	2,163		
Turnout		56,253	56.69	
2nd round result
UMP	Jean-Michel Couve	24,981	56.17	
FN	Jean-Louis Bouguereau	19,490	43.83	
Turnout		44,471	44.80	
UMP hold				

=== 2007 ===
Legislative Election 2007: Var's 4th constituency
Party	Candidate	Votes	%	±%
UMP	Jean-Michel Couve	33,243	46.65	
PS	Michel Pineau	11,246	15.78	
DVD	Alain Spada	10,179	14.28	
FN	Michèle Dutoya	4,027	5.65	
MoDem	Richard Belkadi	3,771	5.29	
LV	Robert Bordin	1,642	2.30	
PCF	Hélène Blanc	1,559	2.19	
Others	N/A	5,594		
Turnout		72,343	59.58	
2nd round result
UMP	Jean-Michel Couve	43,047	65.98	
PS	Michel Pineau	22,200	34.02	
Turnout		67,919	55.94	
UMP hold				

=== 2002 ===
Legislative Election 2002: Var's 4th constituency
Party	Candidate	Votes	%	±%
UMP	Jean-Michel Couve	28,339	42.88	
PS	Christian Martin	16,843	25.49	
FN	Michele Dutoya	13,301	20.13	
CPNT	Christiane Francescon Teza	1,389	2.10	
Others	N/A	6,213		
Turnout		67,391	63.35	
2nd round result
UMP	Jean-Michel Couve	32,268	50.56	
PS	Christian Martin	19,911	31.20	
FN	Michele Dutoya	11,638	18.24	
Turnout		65,123	61.22	
UMP hold				

=== 1997 ===
Legislative Election 1997: Var's 4th constituency
Party	Candidate	Votes	%	±%
RPR	Jean-Michel Couve	19,918	32.45	
PS	Christian Martin	16,805	27.38	
FN	Jean-Louis Bouguereau	14,478	23.59	
PCF	Jean-Pierre Nardini	3,704	6.03	
DVD	Hervé Goudard	1,935	3.15	
GE	Thierry Salerno	1,522	2.48	
Others	N/A	3,021		
Turnout		63,844	67.26	
2nd round result
RPR	Jean-Michel Couve	31,405	46.14	
PS	Christian Martin	25,586	37.59	
FN	Jean-Louis Bouguereau	11,071	16.27	
Turnout		69,883	73.63	
RPR hold				
