= Opinion polling for the 2017 French legislative election =

This page lists public opinion polls conducted for the 2017 French legislative elections, which were held in two rounds on 11 and 18 June 2017.

Unless otherwise noted, all polls listed below are compliant with the regulations of the national polling commission (Commission nationale des sondages) and utilize the quota method.

== Graphical summary ==
The averages in the graphs below were constructed using polls listed below conducted by the nine major French pollsters. The graphs are smoothed 14-day weighted moving averages, using only the most recent poll conducted by any given pollster within that range (each poll weighted based on recency).

No total for Europe Ecology – The Greens (EELV) was provided by the Ministry of the Interior in the 2017 legislative elections. According to statistics compiled by Laurent de Boissieu, 454 EELV candidates collected 3.41% of the vote in the first round.

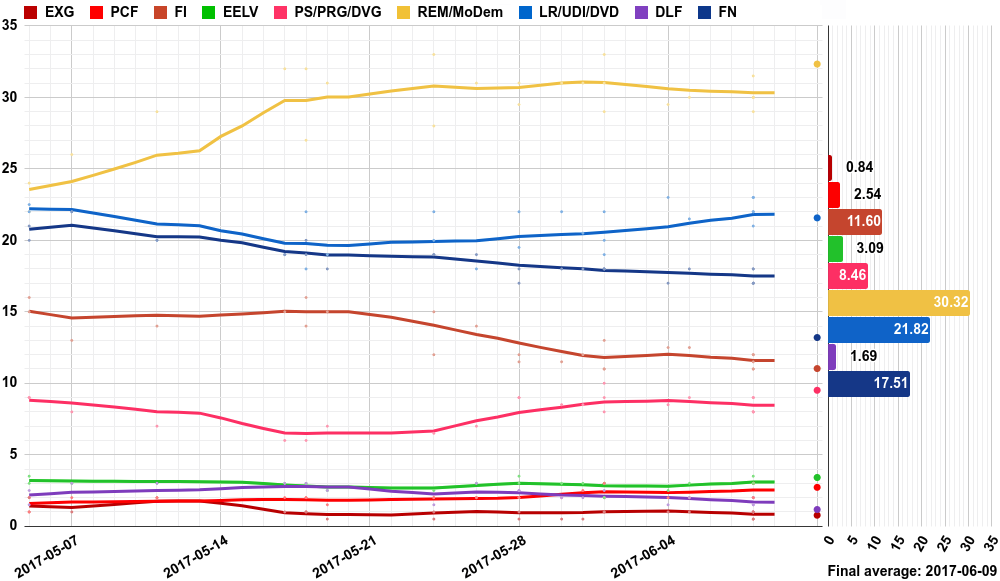

== First round ==
The comparison for the French Communist Party and La France Insoumise with 2012 is made against the Left Front. Before their unification under the umbrella of the Union of Democrats and Independents, the New Centre, Radical Party, and Centrist Alliance were counted individually in 2012, and are included in the miscellaneous right total for that year, which would otherwise be 3.51%.

| Polling firm | Fieldwork date | Sample size | Abs. | EXG | PCF | FI | ECO | EELV | PS | PRG | DVG | LREM | MoDem | UDI | LR | DVD | UPR | DLF | FN | EXD | REG | DIV |
|---|---|---|---|---|---|---|---|---|---|---|---|---|---|---|---|---|---|---|---|---|---|---|
| 2017 election | 11 Jun 2017 | – | 51.30% | 0.77% | 2.72% | 11.03% | 4.30% | | 7.44% | 0.47% | 1.60% | 28.21% | 4.12% | 3.03% | 15.77% | 2.76% | (DIV) | 1.17% | 13.20% | 0.30% | 0.90% | 2.21% |
| Ipsos | 7–8 Jun 2017 | 1,112 | 40% | 1% | 2% | 11.5% | – | 3% | 8% | | | 31.5% | | 22% | | | – | 1.5% | 17% | – | – | 2.5% |
| Harris Interactive | 6–8 Jun 2017 | 931 | – | 1% | 3% | 12% | 3% | | 7% | | 1% | 30% | | 19% | | 2% | – | 1% | 17% | 1% | 3% | |
| OpinionWay | 6–8 Jun 2017 | 3,080 | 46% | 1% | 3% | 12% | 3% | | 7% | | 1% | 30% | | 21% | | 2% | – | – | 18% | – | – | 2% |
| Ifop-Fiducial | 6–8 Jun 2017 | 1,003 | 39% | 0.5% | 3% | 11% | – | 3.5% | 8% | | 1% | 30% | | 20% | | 2% | – | 1.5% | 18% | – | – | 1.5% |
| Elabe | 5–8 Jun 2017 | 1,918 | 51% | 0.5% | 2% | 11% | – | 3% | 9% | | | 29% | | 23% | | | – | 2% | 17% | – | – | 3.5% |
| BVA | 2–5 Jun 2017 | 4,772 | 41% | 1% | 2% | 12.5% | – | 3% | 8% | | 1% | 30% | | 20% | | 1.5% | – | 2% | 18% | – | – | 1% |
| Ipsos | 2–4 Jun 2017 | 1,126 | 40% | 1% | 2% | 12.5% | – | 2.5% | 8.5% | | | 29.5% | | 23% | | | – | 1.5% | 17% | – | – | 2.5% |
| Odoxa | 31 May–1 Jun 2017 | 697 | 48% | 1% | 3% | 11% | – | 3% | 8% | | – | 33% | | 19% | | – | – | 2.5% | 18% | – | – | 1.5% |
| Harris Interactive | 30 May–1 Jun 2017 | 885 | – | 2% | 2% | 11% | 3% | | 8% | | 1% | 31% | | 18% | | 2% | – | 2% | 18% | <0.5% | 2% | |
| OpinionWay | 30 May–1 Jun 2017 | 1,940 | 45% | 1% | 3% | 13% | 2% | | 9% | | 1% | 29% | | 20% | | 2% | – | – | 18% | – | – | 2% |
| Ifop | 29–31 May 2017 | 2,802 | 38% | 0.5% | 2.5% | 12% | – | 3% | 7.5% | | 1% | 31% | | 19% | | 1.5% | – | 2% | 18% | – | – | 2% |
| Ipsos | 27–30 May 2017 | 8,778 | 39% | 0.5% | 2% | 11.5% | – | 3% | 8.5% | | | 31% | | 22% | | | – | 2% | 18% | – | – | 1.5% |
| Ipsos | 26–28 May 2017 | 1,127 | – | 0.5% | 2% | 11.5% | – | 3% | 9% | | | 29.5% | | 22% | | | – | 2.5% | 18% | – | – | 2% |
| Kantar Sofres | 24–28 May 2017 | 2,022 | 37% | 1% | 2% | 12% | – | 3.5% | 8% | | 1% | 31% | | 18% | | 1.5% | 0.5% | 2.5% | 17% | – | – | 2% |
| Harris Interactive | 23–26 May 2017 | 905 | – | 2% | 2% | 14% | – | 3% | 7% | | – | 31% | | 18% | | – | – | 3% | 19% | – | – | 1% |
| OpinionWay | 23–24 May 2017 | 2,103 | – | 1% | 2% | 15% | – | 10% | | | – | 28% | | 20% | | 2% | – | – | 19% | – | – | 3% |
| Elabe | 23–24 May 2017 | 1,011 | 49% | 0.5% | 2% | 12% | – | 2.5% | 6.5% | | – | 33% | | 20% | | – | – | 1.5% | 19% | – | – | 3% |
| Ifop-Fiducial | 18–19 May 2017 | 950 | – | 0.5% | 1.5% | 15% | – | 2.5% | 7% | | – | 31% | | 19% | | – | – | 2.5% | 18% | – | – | 3% |
| Harris Interactive | 16–18 May 2017 | 940 | – | 1% | 2% | 16% | – | 3% | 6% | | – | 32% | | 18% | | – | – | 3% | 19% | – | – | – |
| OpinionWay | 16–18 May 2017 | 1,997 | – | 1% | 2% | 14% | – | 11% | | | – | 27% | | 20% | | 2% | – | – | 20% | – | – | 3% |
| Harris Interactive | 15–17 May 2017 | 4,598 | – | 1% | 2% | 15% | – | 3% | 6% | | – | 32% | | 19% | | – | – | 3% | 19% | – | – | – |
| Harris Interactive | 9–11 May 2017 | 941 | – | 2% | 2% | 14% | – | 3% | 7% | | – | 29% | | 20% | | – | – | 3% | 20% | – | – | – |
| Harris Interactive | 7 May 2017 | 2,376 | – | 1% | 2% | 13% | – | 3% | 8% | | – | 26% | | 22% | | – | – | 3% | 22% | – | – | – |
| Kantar Sofres | 4–5 May 2017 | 1,507 | – | 2% | 1% | 15% | – | 3.5% | 9% | | – | 24% | | 22% | | – | – | 2.5% | 21% | – | – | – |
| Ifop-Fiducial | 4–5 May 2017 | 1,405 | – | 1% | 2% | 16% | – | 3% | 9% | | – | 22% | | 2.5% | 20% | – | – | 1.5% | 20% | – | – | 3% |
| OpinionWay | 24 Apr–1 May 2017 | 5,032 | – | 1% | 10% | | – | 13% | | | – | 26% | | 24% | | 3% | – | – | 19% | – | – | 4% |
| 2012 election | 10 Jun 2012 | – | 42.78% | 0.98% | 6.91% (FG) | | 0.96% | 5.46% | 29.35% | 1.65% | 3.40% | – | 1.77% | – | 27.12% | 7.54% | – | (DVD) | 13.60% | 0.19% | 0.56% | 0.52% |

== Second round seat projections ==
Projections marked with an asterisk (*) were constructed for 535 out of 577 constituencies, including only metropolitan France only and excluding Corsica as well as overseas territories and residents.

The comparison for the French Communist Party and La France Insoumise with 2012 is made against the Left Front. Before their unification under the umbrella of the Union of Democrats and Independents, the New Centre, Radical Party, and Centrist Alliance were counted individually in 2012, and are included in the miscellaneous right total for that year, which would otherwise be 15.

| Polling firm | Fieldwork date | Sample size | Abs. | PCF | FI | PS | PRG | DVG | EELV | LREM | MoDem | UDI | LR | DVD | DLF | FN | EXD | REG | DIV |
|---|---|---|---|---|---|---|---|---|---|---|---|---|---|---|---|---|---|---|---|
| 2017 election | 18 Jun 2017 | – | 57.36% | 10 | 17 | 30 | 3 | 12 | 1 | 308 | 42 | 18 | 112 | 6 | 1 | 8 | 1 | 5 | 3 |
| Odoxa | 14–15 Jun 2017 | 948 | 53% | 8–17 | | 25–35 | | | | 430–460 | | 70–95 | | | – | 1–6 | – | – | 3–7 |
| Harris Interactive | 13–15 Jun 2017 | 914 | – | 14–25 | | 22–35 | | | | 440–470 | | 60–80 | | | – | 1–6 | | – | 3–7 |
| OpinionWay | 13–15 Jun 2017 | 2,901 | 54% | 5–15 | | 20–30 | | | | 440–470 | | 70–90 | | | – | 1–5 | – | – | 3–10 |
| Ipsos | 7–8 Jun 2017 | 1,112 | – | 11–21 | | 22–32 | | | | 397–427 | | 95–115 | | | – | 5–15 | – | – | 5–10 |
| Harris Interactive | 6–8 Jun 2017 | 931 | – | 15–25 | | 20–30 | | | | 360–390 | | 125–140 | | | – | 8–18 | | – | 7–9 |
| OpinionWay | 6–8 Jun 2017 | 3,080 | – | 12–22 | | 15–25 | | | | 370–400 | | 120–150 | | | – | 8–18 | – | – | 5–10 |
| Ipsos | 2–4 Jun 2017 | 1,126 | – | 12–22 | | 25–35 | | | | 385–415 | | 105–125 | | | – | 5–15 | – | – | 3–7 |
| Odoxa | 31 May–1 Jun 2017 | 697 | – | 15–25 | | 25–35 | | | | 350–390 | | 120–160 | | | – | 5–15 | – | – | 5–10 |
| Harris Interactive | 30 May–1 Jun 2017 | 885 | – | 15–25 | | 30–44 | | | | 330–360 | | 135–150 | | | – | 8–22 | | – | 7–9 |
| OpinionWay | 30 May–1 Jun 2017 | 1,940 | – | 24–31 | | 20–35 | | | | 335–355 | | 145–165 | | | – | 7–17 | – | – | 5–10 |
| Ifop-Fiducial | 29–31 May 2017 | 2,802 | – | 15–25 | | 20–35 | | | | 350–380 | | 133–153 | | | – | 9–16 | – | – | 8–12 |
| Ipsos | 27–30 May 2017 | 8,778 | – | 10–20 | | 25–35 | | | | 395–425 | | 95–115 | | | – | 5–15 | – | – | 5–10 |
| Kantar Sofres | 24–28 May 2017 | 2,022 | – | 20–30 | | 40–50 | | | | 320–350 | | 140–155 | | | – | 10–15 | | – | 5–10 |
| OpinionWay* | 23–24 May 2017 | 2,103 | – | 25–30 | | 25–30 | | | | 310–330 | | 140–160 | | | – | 10–15 | – | – | – |
| OpinionWay* | 16–18 May 2017 | 1,997 | – | 20–25 | | 40–50 | | | | 280–300 | | 150–170 | | | – | 10–15 | – | – | – |
| OpinionWay* | 24 Apr–1 May 2017 | 5,032 | – | 6–8 | | 28–43 | | | | 249–286 | | 200–210 | | | – | 15–25 | – | – | – |
| 2012 election | 17 Jun 2012 | – | 44.60% | 10 (FG) | | 280 | 12 | 22 | 17 | – | 2 | – | 194 | 35 | (DVD) | 2 | 1 | 2 | 0 |

== By second round configuration ==
| Polling firm | Fieldwork date | Sample size | Left | LREM | Right | FN |
|---|---|---|---|---|---|---|
| OpinionWay | 13–15 Jun 2017 | 2,901 | 41% | 59% | – | – |
| OpinionWay | 13–15 Jun 2017 | 2,901 | – | 58% | 42% | – |
| OpinionWay | 13–15 Jun 2017 | 2,901 | – | 60% | – | 40% |

=== By first round vote ===
In each case, results were based on interviews in which respondents were presented with a list of candidates in their constituency.

==== LREM/MoDem–LR/UDI/DVD ====
| Polling firm | Fieldwork date | Sample size | First round vote | LREM/ MoDem | LR/UDI/ DVD | No vote |
|---|---|---|---|---|---|---|
| OpinionWay | 13–15 Jun 2017 | 2,901 | FI | 33% | 8% | 59% |
| OpinionWay | 13–15 Jun 2017 | 2,901 | PS | 45% | 10% | 45% |
| OpinionWay | 13–15 Jun 2017 | 2,901 | FN | 8% | 30% | 62% |

==== PS/FI/DVG–LREM/MoDem ====
| Polling firm | Fieldwork date | Sample size | First round vote | PS/FI/ DVG | LREM/ MoDem | No vote |
|---|---|---|---|---|---|---|
| OpinionWay | 13–15 Jun 2017 | 2,901 | LR/UDI | 18% | 50% | 32% |
| OpinionWay | 13–15 Jun 2017 | 2,901 | FN | 28% | 6% | 66% |

==== LREM/MoDem–FN ====
| Polling firm | Fieldwork date | Sample size | First round vote | LREM/ MoDem | FN | No vote |
|---|---|---|---|---|---|---|
| OpinionWay | 13–15 Jun 2017 | 2,901 | FI | 27% | 11% | 62% |
| OpinionWay | 13–15 Jun 2017 | 2,901 | PS | 64% | 4% | 32% |
| OpinionWay | 13–15 Jun 2017 | 2,901 | LR/UDI | 35% | 32% | 33% |

== By constituency ==
=== First round ===
==== Bouches-du-Rhône's 4th ====
| Polling firm | Fieldwork date | Sample size | Abs. | Jean-Luc Mélenchon FI | Patrick Mennucci PS–EELV | Corinne Versini LREM | Solange Biaggi LR–UDI | Jeanne Marti FN | Others |
|---|---|---|---|---|---|---|---|---|---|
| 2017 election | 11 Jun 2017 | – | 57.86% | 34.31% | 12.43% | 22.66% | 10.63% | 10.92% | 9.07% |
| Harris Interactive | 17–18 May 2017 | 616 | – | 35% | 13% | 26% | 9% | 12% | 5% |
| Ifop-Fiducial | 17–18 May 2017 | 602 | – | 38% | 13% | 24% | 10% | 12% | 3% |

==== Charente-Maritime's 1st ====
| Polling firm | Fieldwork date | Sample size | Abs. | Cédric Ruffié FI | Jean-Marc Soubeste EELV | Olivier Falorni DVG | Otilia Ferreira MoDem–LREM | Bruno Léal LR | Jean-Marc de Lacoste-Lareymondie FN | Others |
|---|---|---|---|---|---|---|---|---|---|---|
| 2017 election | 11 Jun 2017 | – | 48.84% | 10.92% | 3.91% | 36.54% | 26.99% | 9.83% | 7.03% | 4.79% |
| Ifop-Fiducial | 2–6 Jun 2017 | 685 | – | 15% | 3% | 34% | 25% | 12% | 8% | 3% |

==== Eure's 1st ====
| Polling firm | Fieldwork date | Sample size | Abs. | Michaël Després FI | Bruno Le Maire LREM | Coumba Dioukhané LR | Fabienne Delacour FN | Others |
|---|---|---|---|---|---|---|---|---|
| 2017 election | 11 Jun 2017 | – | 52.01% | 11.43% | 44.46% | 6.16% | 22.09% | 15.86% |
| Ifop-Fiducial | 22–24 May 2017 | 603 | – | 16% | 48% | 7% | 20% | 9% |

==== Gard's 2nd ====
| Polling firm | Fieldwork date | Sample size | Abs. | Danielle Floutier FI | Béatrice Leccia EELV | Marie Sara MoDem–LREM | Pascale Mourrut LR | Gilbert Collard FN | Others |
|---|---|---|---|---|---|---|---|---|---|
| 2017 election | 11 Jun 2017 | – | 50.24% | 13.07% | 2.99% | 32.16% | 14.22% | 32.27% | 5.30% |
| Ifop-Fiducial | 30–31 May 2017 | 600 | – | 14% | 3% | 31% | 17.5% | 32% | 2.5% |

==== Gironde's 2nd ====
| Polling firm | Fieldwork date | Sample size | Abs. | Servane Crussière PCF | Aude Darchy FI | Michèle Delaunay PS | Pierre Hurmic EELV | Catherine Fabre LREM | Anne Walryck LR–UDI | Guillaume Boraud DVD | Julie Rechagneux FN | Others |
|---|---|---|---|---|---|---|---|---|---|---|---|---|
| 2017 election | 11 Jun 2017 | – | 48.92% | 1.90% | 13.28% | 10.69% | 8.04% | 39.78% | 15.79% | 1.22% | 3.76% | 5.54% |
| Ifop-Fiducial | 5–7 Jun 2017 | 691 | – | 2% | 17% | 14% | 5.5% | 35% | 15% | 1.5% | 5% | 5% |

==== Landes's 1st ====
| Polling firm | Fieldwork date | Sample size | Abs. | Céline Piot FI | Renaud Lagrave PS | Geneviève Darrieussecq MoDem–LREM | Marie-Françoise Nadau LR–UDI | Christophe Bardin FN | Others |
|---|---|---|---|---|---|---|---|---|---|
| 2017 election | 11 Jun 2017 | – | 45.72% | 12.04% | 13.46% | 43.34% | 11.60% | 11.48% | 8.07% |
| Ifop-Fiducial | 1–5 Jun 2017 | 687 | – | 13% | 12% | 43% | 10% | 12% | 10% |

==== Pas-de-Calais's 11th ====
| Polling firm | Fieldwork date | Sample size | Abs. | Hervé Poly PCF | Jean-Pierre Carpentier FI | Philippe Kemel PS | Marine Tondelier EELV | Anne Roquet LREM | Alexandrine Pintus LR–UDI | Marine Le Pen FN | Others |
|---|---|---|---|---|---|---|---|---|---|---|---|
| 2017 election | 11 Jun 2017 | – | 53.33% | 5.00% | 9.97% | 10.83% | 3.55% | 16.43% | 4.18% | 46.02% | 4.01% |
| Ifop-Fiducial | 1–3 Jun 2017 | 601 | – | 4% | 13.5% | 14.5% | 2.5% | 15.5% | 4% | 44% | 2% |

==== Pyrénées-Atlantiques's 4th ====
| Polling firm | Fieldwork date | Sample size | Abs. | Robert Bareille PCF | Didier Bayens FI | Bernard Uthurry PS | Véronique Zenoni EELV | Loïc Corrégé LREM | Jean Lassalle Résistons! | Laurent Inchauspé UDI | Marc Oxibar LR | Gilles Hustaix FN | Anita Lopepe EH Bai | Others |
|---|---|---|---|---|---|---|---|---|---|---|---|---|---|---|
| 2017 election | 11 Jun 2017 | – | 41.47% | 3.35% | 7.67% | 12.63% | 2.69% | 25.41% | 17.71% | 5.42% | 9.66% | 4.28% | 8.51% | 2.68% |
| Ifop-Fiducial | 29 May–2 Jun 2017 | 689 | – | 4.5% | 9% | 16% | 1.5% | 24.5% | 16% | 3.5% | 11.5% | 5% | 7% | 1.5% |

==== Rhône's 6th ====
| Polling firm | Fieldwork date | Sample size | Abs. | Laurent Legendre FI | Najat Vallaud-Belkacem PS | Béatrice Vessiller EELV | Bruno Bonnell LREM | Emmanuelle Haziza LR–UDI | Stéphane Poncet FN | Others |
|---|---|---|---|---|---|---|---|---|---|---|
| 2017 election | 11 Jun 2017 | – | 53.24% | 14.71% | 16.54% | 4.75% | 36.69% | 10.67% | 9.03% | 7.60% |
| Ifop-Fiducial | 16–18 May 2017 | 601 | – | 17% | 19% | 4% | 30% | 13% | 12% | 5% |

==== Paris's 2nd ====
| Polling firm | Fieldwork date | Sample size | Abs. | Lorraine Questiaux PCF | Anne-Françoise Prunières FI | Marine Rosset PS | Gilles Seignan EELV | Gilles Le Gendre LREM | Nathalie Kosciusko-Morizet LR–UDI | Henri Guaino DVD | Jean-Pierre Lecoq DVD | Pauline Betton PCD | Manon Bouquin FN | Others |
|---|---|---|---|---|---|---|---|---|---|---|---|---|---|---|
| 2017 election | 11 Jun 2017 | – | 37.91% | 1.35% | 5.96% | 6.11% | 4.72% | 41.81% | 18.13% | 4.51% | 9.17% | 1.26% | 2.31% | 4.66% |
| Ifop-Fiducial | 29–31 May 2017 | 552 | – | 1% | 7.5% | 7% | 3% | 42% | 24% | 3% | 7% | 1% | 3% | 1.5% |

==== Essonne's 1st ====
| Polling firm | Fieldwork date | Sample size | Abs. | Michel Nouaille PCF–EELV | Farida Amrani FI | Manuel Valls DVG | Alban Bakary DVD | Caroline Varin LR–UDI | Jean-Luc Raymond DVD | David Soullard DLF | Danielle Oger FN | Dieudonné SE | Others |
|---|---|---|---|---|---|---|---|---|---|---|---|---|---|
| 2017 election | 11 Jun 2017 | – | 59.89% | 7.58% | 17.61% | 25.45% | 7.83% | 11.93% | 6.89% | 2.40% | 10.20% | 3.84% | 6.27% |
| Ifop-Fiducial | 22–23 May 2017 | 605 | – | 6.5% | 26% | 30% | 2.5% | 12% | 0.5% | 3% | 12% | 3% | 4.5% |

==== Hauts-de-Seine's 9th ====
The campaign of Marie-Laure Godin commissioned and released a PollingVox survey in this constituency, after which the campaign of Thierry Solère published an Ifop poll contradicting its findings.

| Polling firm | Fieldwork date | Sample size | Abs. | Fabienne Gambiez PRG–UDE–PS | Aminata Niakate EELV | Thierry Solère LR–UDI | Marie-Laure Godin DVD | Nina Smarandi FN | Others |
|---|---|---|---|---|---|---|---|---|---|
| 2017 election | 11 Jun 2017 | – | 46.66% | 6.37% | 5.01% | 42.60% | 31.38% | 3.21% | 11.43% |
| Ifop | 2–3 Jun 2017 | 597 | – | 8% | 4.5% | 44% | 29% | 4% | 10.5% |
| PollingVox | 24–31 May 2017 | 564 | – | – | 7% | 32% | 42% | 9% | – |

=== Second round ===
==== Bouches-du-Rhône's 4th ====
| Polling firm | Fieldwork date | Sample size | Abs. | Jean-Luc Mélenchon FI | Patrick Mennucci PS–EELV | Corinne Versini LREM |
|---|---|---|---|---|---|---|
| 2017 election | 18 Jun 2017 | – | 64.22% | 59.85% | – | 40.15% |
| Harris Interactive | 17–18 May 2017 | 616 | – | 56% | – | 44% |
| Ifop-Fiducial | 17–18 May 2017 | 602 | – | 53% | – | 47% |
| Ifop-Fiducial | 17–18 May 2017 | 602 | – | 61% | 39% | – |

==== Charente-Maritime's 1st ====
| Polling firm | Fieldwork date | Sample size | Abs. | Cédric Ruffié FI | Olivier Falorni DVG | Otilia Ferreira MoDem–LREM |
|---|---|---|---|---|---|---|
| 2017 election | 18 Jun 2017 | – | 56.58% | – | 69.02% | 30.98% |
| Ifop-Fiducial | 2–6 Jun 2017 | 685 | – | – | 55% | 45% |
| Ifop-Fiducial | 2–6 Jun 2017 | 685 | – | 20% | 41% | 39% |

==== Eure's 1st ====
| Polling firm | Fieldwork date | Sample size | Abs. | Bruno Le Maire LREM | Fabienne Delacour FN |
|---|---|---|---|---|---|
| 2017 election | 18 Jun 2017 | – | 57.74% | 64.53% | 35.47% |
| Ifop-Fiducial | 22–24 May 2017 | 603 | – | 76% | 24% |

==== Gard's 2nd ====
| Polling firm | Fieldwork date | Sample size | Abs. | Marie Sara MoDem–LREM | Pascale Mourrut LR | Gilbert Collard FN |
|---|---|---|---|---|---|---|
| 2017 election | 18 Jun 2017 | – | 51.79% | 49.84% | – | 50.16% |
| Ifop-Fiducial | 30–31 May 2017 | 600 | – | 56% | – | 44% |
| Ifop-Fiducial | 30–31 May 2017 | 600 | – | 41% | 22% | 37% |

==== Landes's 3rd ====
| Polling firm | Fieldwork date | Sample size | Abs. | Boris Vallaud PS | Jean-Pierre Steiner LREM |
|---|---|---|---|---|---|
| 2017 election | 18 Jun 2017 | – | 46.78% | 50.75% | 49.25% |
| Ifop-Fiducial | 13–14 Jun 2017 | 651 | – | 46% | 54% |

==== Pyrénées-Atlantiques's 4th ====
| Polling firm | Fieldwork date | Sample size | Abs. | Bernard Uthurry PS | Loïc Corrégé LREM | Jean Lassalle Résistons! |
|---|---|---|---|---|---|---|
| 2017 election | 18 Jun 2017 | – | 46.63% | – | 47.21% | 52.79% |
| Ifop-Fiducial | 29 May–2 Jun 2017 | 689 | – | 31% | 35% | 34% |

==== Rhône's 6th ====
| Polling firm | Fieldwork date | Sample size | Abs. | Laurent Legendre FI | Najat Vallaud-Belkacem PS | Bruno Bonnell LREM |
|---|---|---|---|---|---|---|
| 2017 election | 18 Jun 2017 | – | 59.58% | – | 39.82% | 60.18% |
| Ifop-Fiducial | 16–18 May 2017 | 601 | – | – | 40% | 60% |
| Ifop-Fiducial | 16–18 May 2017 | 601 | – | 38% | – | 62% |

==== Paris's 2nd ====
| Polling firm | Fieldwork date | Sample size | Abs. | Gilles Le Gendre LREM | Nathalie Kosciusko-Morizet LR–UDI |
|---|---|---|---|---|---|
| 2017 election | 18 Jun 2017 | – | 48.47% | 54.53% | 45.47% |
| Ifop-Fiducial | 29–31 May 2017 | 552 | – | 68% | 32% |

==== Essonne's 1st ====
| Polling firm | Fieldwork date | Sample size | Abs. | Farida Amrani FI | Manuel Valls DVG |
|---|---|---|---|---|---|
| 2017 election | 18 Jun 2017 | – | 63.45% | 49.70% | 50.30% |
| Ifop-Fiducial | 22–23 May 2017 | 605 | – | 50% | 50% |

==== Hauts-de-Seine's 9th ====
The campaign of Marie-Laure Godin commissioned and released a PollingVox survey in this constituency, after which the campaign of Thierry Solère published an Ifop poll contradicting its findings.

| Polling firm | Fieldwork date | Sample size | Abs. | Thierry Solère LR–UDI | Marie-Laure Godin DVD |
|---|---|---|---|---|---|
| 2017 election | 18 Jun 2017 | – | 55.62% | 56.53% | 43.47% |
| PollingVox | 24–31 May 2017 | 564 | – | 43% | 57% |

== Pre-2017 polling ==
=== First round ===
Before their unification under the umbrella of the Union of Democrats and Independents, the New Centre, Radical Party, and Centrist Alliance were counted individually in 2012, and are included in the miscellaneous right total for that year, which would otherwise be 3.51%. The total for miscellaneous candidates in 2012 also includes regionalist, ecologist, and far-right candidates who were not counted separately in the CSA poll, and would otherwise be 0.52%.

| Polling firm | Fieldwork date | Sample size | Abs. | EXG | FG | MRC | PS | PRG | DVG | EELV | MoDem | UDI | UMP | DVD | DLF | FN | DIV |
|---|---|---|---|---|---|---|---|---|---|---|---|---|---|---|---|---|---|
| CSA | 18–20 Nov 2014 | 955 | – | 1% | 8% | 18% | | | | 7% | 12% | | 24% | | 1% | 23% | 6% |
| 2012 election | 10 Jun 2012 | – | 42.78% | 0.98% | 6.91% | (DVG) | 29.35% | 1.65% | 3.40% | 5.46% | 1.77% | – | 27.12% | 7.54% | (DVD) | 13.60% | 2.23% |

=== Second round seat projections ===
Before their unification under the umbrella of the Union of Democrats and Independents, the New Centre, Radical Party, and Centrist Alliance were counted individually in 2012, and are included in the miscellaneous right total for that year, which would otherwise be 15. The total for miscellaneous candidates in 2012 also includes regionalist and far-right candidates who were not counted separately in the CSA poll, and would otherwise be 0.

| Polling firm | Fieldwork date | Sample size | Abs. | FG | MRC | PS | PRG | DVG | EELV | MoDem | UDI | UMP | DVD | DLF | FN | DIV |
|---|---|---|---|---|---|---|---|---|---|---|---|---|---|---|---|---|
| CSA | 18–20 Nov 2014 | 955 | – | 56–66 | | | | | | 485–505 | | | | | 14–24 | 1–3 |
| 2012 election | 17 Jun 2012 | – | 44.60% | 10 | (DVG) | 280 | 12 | 22 | 17 | 2 | – | 194 | 35 | (DVD) | 2 | 3 |

== See also ==
- Opinion polling for the French presidential election, 2017
- Opinion polling for the French legislative election, 2012
- Opinion polling for the French legislative election, 2007
