= Opinion polling for the 2007 French legislative election =

This page lists public opinion polls conducted for the 2007 French legislative elections, which were held in two rounds on 10 and 17 June 2007.

Unless otherwise noted, all polls listed below are compliant with the regulations of the national polling commission (Commission nationale des sondages) and utilize the quota method.

== Graphical summary ==
The averages in the graphs below were constructed using polls listed below conducted by the five major French pollsters. The graphs are smoothed 14-day weighted moving averages, using only the most recent poll conducted by any given pollster within that range (each poll weighted based on recency).

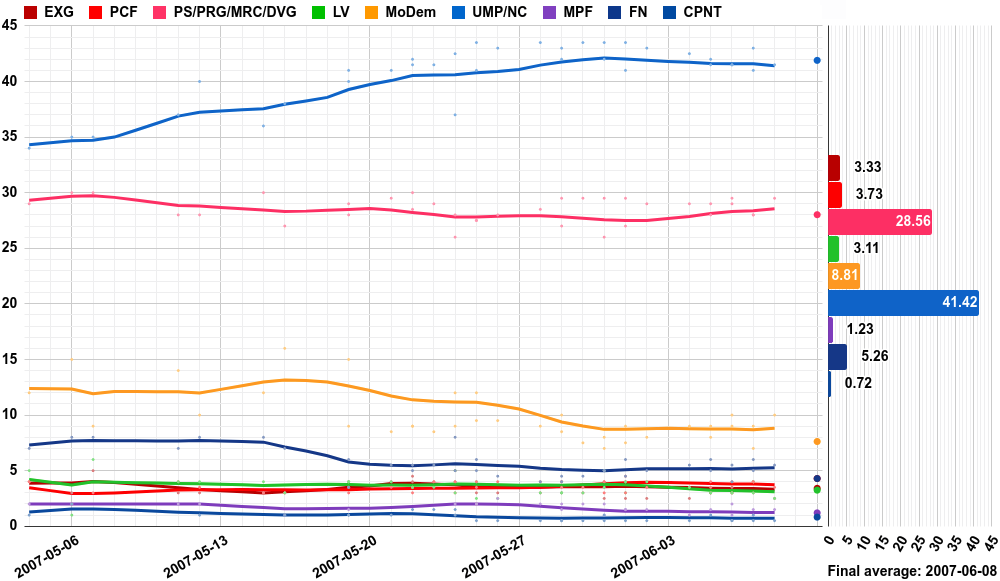

== First round ==
During the 2007 presidential election, Ipsos launched the first ever rolling poll in France, described as a "continuous electoral barometer", which it continued to carry out for the legislative elections in June.

Other far-left parties received 0.32% of the vote in the first round in 2002; this total is included in the total for miscellaneous candidates, which would otherwise be 0.84%. Results for the Citizen and Republican Movement are compared with those of the Republican Pole in 2002, and Liberal Democracy and Rally for France are included in the miscellaneous right total for that year, which would otherwise be 3.89%; the two parties received 0.42% and 0.36% of the vote, respectively.

Polling firm	Fieldwork date	Sample size	Abs.	LO	LCR	PCF	MRC	PS	PRG	DVG	LV	ECO	MoDem	NC	UMP	DVD	MPF	FN	MNR	CPNT	EXD	REG	DIV
2007 election	10 Jun 2007	–	39.58%	3.41% (EXG)		4.29%	(DVG)	24.73%	1.32%	1.97%	3.25%	0.80%	7.61%	2.37%	39.54%	2.47%	1.20%	4.29%	(EXD)	0.82%	0.39%	0.51%	1.03%
Ipsos	8 Jun 2007	962	–	2.5%		3.5%	29.5%				2.5%	–	10%	41.5%		1%	1.5%	5.5%	0.5%	0.5%	–	–	1.5%
CSA	6–7 Jun 2007	822	–	1%	3%	4%	28%			–	4%	–	7%	41%		–	1%	6%	–	1%	–	–	4%
Ipsos	6–7 Jun 2007	1,207	–	3%		4%	28%				3%	–	9%	43%		1%	1.5%	5%	0.5%	0.5%	–	–	1.5%
Ipsos	5–6 Jun 2007	1,207	–	3%		4%	29%				3%	–	9%	41.5%		1%	2%	5.5%	0.5%	0.5%	–	–	1%
TNS Sofres	5–6 Jun 2007	1,000	–	3.5%		3%	29.5%				3%	–	10%	41.5%		2%	1%	4%	0.5%	0.5%	–	–	1.5%
BVA	4–5 Jun 2007	820	–	3%		4%	28%				3%	–	8%	42%		4%	–	5%		–	–	–	3%
Ipsos	4–5 Jun 2007	1,206	–	3%		3.5%	29%				3%	–	9%	41.5%		1%	1.5%	6%	0.5%	1%	–	–	1%
Ipsos	1–4 Jun 2007	1,558	–	2.5%		3.5%	29%				3.5%	–	9%	42.5%		1%	1%	5.5%	0.5%	0.5%	–	–	1.5%
Ipsos	31 May–2 Jun 2007	1,357	–	2.5%		3.5%	29%				4%	–	8%	43%		1%	1.5%	5%	0.5%	0.5%	–	–	1.5%
Ifop	31 May–1 Jun 2007	929	–	4%		4.5%	27%			–	3%	–	9%	41%		–	1.5%	6%	–	–	–	–	4%
Ipsos	30 May–1 Jun 2007	1,224	–	2.5%		3%	29.5%				4%	–	7.5%	43.5%		1.5%	1.5%	4.5%	0.5%	0.5%	–	–	1.5%
CSA	30–31 May 2007	852	–	2%	2%	4%	26%			–	5%	–	8%	42%		–	1%	5%	–	1%	–	–	4%
Ipsos	29–31 May 2007	1,212	–	2.5%		3%	29.5%				3.5%	–	7%	43.5%		1.5%	2%	5%	0.5%	0.5%	–	–	1.5%
Ipsos	28–30 May 2007	1,215	–	3%		3.5%	29.5%				3%	–	7.5%	43.5%		1.5%	2%	4.5%	0.5%	0.5%	–	–	1%
TNS Sofres	28–29 May 2007	1,000	–	4%		4%	27%				3%	–	10%	42%		2%	1.5%	4%	0.5%	0.5%	–	–	1.5%
Ipsos	26–29 May 2007	1,321	–	3%		3.5%	29.5%				3%	–	8.5%	43%		1%	2%	4.5%	0.5%	0.5%	–	–	1%
Ipsos	25–28 May 2007	1,356	–	3%		4%	28.5%			–	3%	–	9%	43.5%		1%	2%	4%	0.5%	0.5%	–	–	1%
Ipsos	24–26 May 2007	1,356	–	3%		4%	28%			–	2.5%	–	9.5%	–	43%	1%	2.5%	4.5%	0.5%	0.5%	–	–	1%
Ifop	24–25 May 2007	931	–	2%		3.5%	27.5%			–	4%	–	12%	–	41%	–	2%	6%	–	–	–	–	2%
Ipsos	23–25 May 2007	1,251	–	3%		4%	27.5%				2.5%	–	9.5%	–	43.5%	1%	2%	5%	0.5%	0.5%	–	–	1%
CSA	23–24 May 2007	863	–	2%	3%	3%	26%			–	5%	–	12%	–	37%	–	2%	8%	–	1%	–	–	1%
Ipsos	22–24 May 2007	1,213	–	4%		4%	28%				3%	–	9%	–	42.5%	2.5%	–	5%	0.5%	1.5%	–	–	–
Ipsos	21–23 May 2007	1,212	–	4%		4%	29%				3.5%	–	8.5%	–	41.5%	2%	–	5.5%	0.5%	1.5%	–	–	–
BVA	21–22 May 2007	865	–	4.5%		3%	30%			–	3.5%	–	9%	–	42%	3%	–	5%	–	–	–	–	–
Ipsos	19–22 May 2007	1,773	–	4%		3.5%	28.5%			–	3.5%	–	9%	–	41.5%	2.5%	–	5.5%	0.5%	1.5%	–	–	–
Ipsos	19–21 May 2007	1,372	–	4%		3.5%	29.5%			–	4%	–	8.5%	–	41%	2.5%	–	5.5%	0.5%	1%	–	–	–
Ipsos	19 May 2007	968	–	4%		3%	29%			–	4%	–	9%	–	41%	2.5%	–	6%	0.5%	1%	–	–	–
TNS Sofres	18–19 May 2007	1,000	–	3.5%		3.5%	28%			–	4%	–	15%	–	40%	–	1.5%	3.5%	–	1%	–	–	–
CSA	15–16 May 2007	890	–	1%	2%	3%	27%			–	3%	–	16%	–	38%	–	1%	7%	–	1%	–	–	1%
BVA	14–15 May 2007	840	–	3%		3%	30%			–	4%	–	12%	–	36%	4%	–	8%	–	–	–	–	–
Ipsos	11–12 May 2007	948	–	3%		3.5%	28%			–	4%	–	10%	–	40%	–	2%	8%	0.5%	1%	–	–	–
Ifop	10–11 May 2007	885	–	3%		4%	28%			–	4%	–	14%	–	37%	–	2%	7%	–	–	–	–	1%
BVA	7 May 2007	806	–	5%		3%	30%			–	6%	–	9%	–	35%	4%	–	8%	–	–	–	–	–
CSA	6 May 2007	1,030	–	2%	1%	2%	30%			–	1%	–	15%	–	35%	–	2%	8%	–	2%	–	–	2%
Ifop	3–4 May 2007	883	–	4%		4%	29%			–	5%	–	12%	–	34%	–	2%	7%	–	1%	–	–	2%
TNS Sofres	23 Apr 2007	1,000	–	4%		3%	32%			–	4%	–	12%	–	32%	–	2%	9%	–	2%	–	–	–
BVA	8–9 Jan 2007	859	–	4%		5%	31%			2%	5%	1%	5%	–	31%	3%	–	10%		3%	–	–	–
2002 election	9 Jun 2002	–	35.58%	1.18%	1.24%	4.91%	1.19%	23.78%	1.51%	1.38%	4.44%	1.15%	4.79%	–	33.37%	4.68%	0.79%	11.12%	1.08%	1.64%	0.25%	0.36%	1.16%

== Second round seat projections ==
Projections marked with an asterisk (*) are for 555 deputies representing metropolitan France. The final three Ipsos projections were constructed using interviews in 184 constituencies with left-right duels where the outcome appeared uncertain, while the two preceding projections were based on 197 constituencies.

Seats for Liberal Democracy and Rally for France are included in the miscellaneous right total for 2002, which would otherwise be 9; the parties each won 2 seats.

Polling firm	Fieldwork date	Sample size	Abs.	PCF	MRC	PS	PRG	DVG	LV	MoDem	NC	UMP	DVD	MPF	REG	DIV
2007 election	17 Jun 2007	–	40.02%	15	(DVG)	186	7	15	4	3	22	313	9	1	1	1
Ipsos	14–15 Jun 2007	1,209	–	11–16	140–175				2–4	2–3	20–23	358–395		2	–	–
CSA*	13–14 Jun 2007	939	–	10–15	95–130			–	1–3	1–3	420–463		–	1–3	–	–
Ipsos	13–14 Jun 2007	1,009	–	10–15	125–156				2–3	2–3	20–23	379–411		2	–	–
Ipsos	12–13 Jun 2007	972	–	10–15	121–149				1–3	2–3	20–23	386–415		2	–	–
TNS Sofres*	12–13 Jun 2007	1,000	–	10–15	125–155			–	2–4	1–2	21–23	380–410	–	2	–	2
BVA*	12 Jun 2007	806	–	10–16	105–131				3–4	1–3	394–434			–	–	–
Ipsos	11–12 Jun 2007	1,373	–	8–15	115–146				1–3	2–3	20–23	388–422		2	–	–
Ipsos	11 Jun 2007	793	–	7–14	117–157				1–3	1–3	20–23	387–428		2	–	–
Ipsos*	8 Jun 2007	962	–	5–10	114–162				0–2	2–6	21–24	364–404		–	–	–
CSA*	6–7 Jun 2007	822	–	4–12	110–154			–	1–3	1–6	390–420		–	2–3	–	–
TNS Sofres*	5–6 Jun 2007	1,000	–	4–10	115–155			–	1–3	2–6	390–430		–	2–3	–	–
BVA*	4–5 Jun 2007	820	–	6–14	120–173				1–3	1–4	366–419			0–3	–	–
Ipsos*	4–5 Jun 2007	1,206	–	5–10	115–158				0–2	1–6	21–24	361–406		–	–	–
Ifop*	31 May–1 Jun 2007	929	–	9–15	80–120			–	0–2	0–4	–	420–460	–	2	–	–
CSA*	30–31 May 2007	852	–	4–12	111–151			–	1–3	1–6	402–425		–	2–3	–	–
TNS Sofres*	28–29 May 2007	1,000	–	4–10	101–142			–	1–3	2–6	410–430		–	2–3	–	–
Ipsos*	25–28 May 2007	1,356	–	6–12	102–142				0–2	1–6	21–25	380–417		–	–	–
Ifop*	24–25 May 2007	931	–	6–10	90–130			–	0–2	0–6	–	410–450	–	2	–	–
CSA*	23–24 May 2007	863	–	6–14	132–182			–	1–4	1–6	–	353–407	–	2–3	–	–
BVA*	21–22 May 2007	865	–	4–10	121–159				0–3	0–3	–	379–431		–	–	–
TNS Sofres*	18–19 May 2007	1,000	–	2–9	137–153			–	1–2	2–10	–	365–415	–	2–3	–	–
BVA*	14–15 May 2007	840	–	14–21	151–200				1–2	0–4	–	317–381	4–11	–	–	–
Ifop*	10–11 May 2007	885	–	9–13	149–190			–	0–4	0–8	–	336–390	–	0–2	–	–
BVA*	7 May 2007	806	–	14–18	158–200				0–6	8–13	–	288–344	4–7	–	–	–
2002 election	16 Jun 2002	–	39.69%	21	0	140	7	6	3	29	–	355	13	1	1	1

== By second round configuration ==
Configurations tested before the first were collected among a national sample, except for the Ipsos poll conducted on 13 June 2007 which was conducted specifically in 17 constituencies where a victory for a French Communist Party candidate was considered possible.

=== PS/PCF/LV–UMP/NC ===
Polling firm	Fieldwork date	Sample size	PS/ PCF/LV	UMP/ NC
Ipsos	8 Jun 2007	962	44%	56%
Ipsos	6–7 Jun 2007	1,207	43%	57%
Ipsos	5–6 Jun 2007	1,207	44%	56%
Ipsos	4–5 Jun 2007	1,206	44%	56%
Ipsos	1–4 Jun 2007	1,558	43%	57%
Ipsos	31 May–2 Jun 2007	1,357	43.5%	56.5%
Ipsos	30 May–1 Jun 2007	1,224	44%	56%
Ipsos	29–31 May 2007	1,212	44.5%	55.5%
Ipsos	28–30 May 2007	1,215	44%	56%
Ipsos	26–29 May 2007	1,321	43.5%	56.5%
Ipsos	25–28 May 2007	1,356	42.5%	57.5%
Ipsos	24–26 May 2007	1,356	42.5%	57.5%
Ipsos	23–25 May 2007	1,251	42%	58%
Ipsos	22–24 May 2007	1,213	42%	58%
Ipsos	21–23 May 2007	1,212	43%	57%
Ipsos	19–22 May 2007	1,773	43%	57%
Ipsos	19–21 May 2007	1,372	44%	56%
Ipsos	19 May 2007	968	43%	57%
Ipsos	11–12 May 2007	948	44%	56%

=== PS/PCF/LV–MoDem–UMP ===
Polling firm	Fieldwork date	Sample size	PS/ PCF/LV	MoDem	UMP
Ipsos	21–23 May 2007	1,212	39%	9%	52%
Ipsos	19–22 May 2007	1,773	38%	10%	52%
Ipsos	19–21 May 2007	1,372	39%	10%	51%
Ipsos	19 May 2007	968	38%	10%	52%
Ipsos	11–12 May 2007	948	38%	11%	51%

=== PCF–UMP/NC ===
Polling firm	Fieldwork date	Sample size	PCF	UMP/ NC
Ipsos	13 Jun 2007	603	54%	46%

== By constituency ==
=== First round ===
==== Ardèche's 2nd ====
Polling firm	Fieldwork date	Sample size	Abs.	Jean Fantini PCF	Olivier Dussopt PS	Jean-Claude Mourgues LV	Dominique Chambon MoDem	Gérard Weber UMP	Jacques Dubay DVD	Claude Richard FN	Others
2007 election	10 Jun 2007	–	37.71%	3.51%	26.10%	3.42%	8.82%	29.37%	16.87%	3.72%	8.20%
BVA	1–5 Jun 2007	607	–	2.5%	27%	4%	14%	26%	14%	6%	6.5%

==== Drôme's 2nd ====
Polling firm	Fieldwork date	Sample size	Abs.	Anne-Marie Reme-Pic PS	Thierry Cornillet MoDem	Franck Reynier UMP	Joël Cheval FN	Others
2007 election	10 Jun 2007	–	39.10%	27.76%	13.71%	40.41%	6.63%	11.50%
BVA	31 May–2 Jun 2007	603	–	28%	17%	36%	6%	13%

==== Eure's 3rd ====
Polling firm	Fieldwork date	Sample size	Abs.	Francis Courel PS diss.	Nathalie Zanon PS	Philippe Raviart MoDem	Hervé Morin NC	Marc Le Tanneur FN	Others
2007 election	10 Jun 2007	–	36.78%	16.07%	10.32%	5.40%	50.05%	3.97%	14.19%
Ifop	4–5 Jun 2007	607	–	17%	10%	5%	49%	4%	15%

==== Gironde's 2nd ====
Polling firm	Fieldwork date	Sample size	Abs.	Michèle Delaunay PS	Pierre Hurmic LV	Ludovic Guinard MoDem	Alain Juppé UMP	Others
2007 election	10 Jun 2007	–	39.54%	31.36%	6.83%	8.31%	43.73%	9.77%
Ifop	29–30 May 2007	602	–	33%	6%	6%	44%	11%

==== Isère's 1st ====
Polling firm	Fieldwork date	Sample size	Abs.	Geneviève Fioraso PS	Marie-Odile Novelli LV	Philippe de Longevialle MoDem	Alain Carignon UMP	Richard Cazenave DVD	Others
2007 election	10 Jun 2007	–	36.88%	32.02%	6.52%	10.35%	21.45%	19.62%	10.04%
BVA	31 May–2 Jun 2007	604	–	35%	5%	11%	19%	20%	10%

==== Pyrénées-Atlantiques's 2nd ====
Jean-Pierre Mariné withdrew and did not contest the second round despite being eligible to after the decision of the party to allow Bayrou to carry the constituency.

Polling firm	Fieldwork date	Sample size	Abs.	Marie-Pierre Cabanne PS	Nicole Juyoux LV	François Bayrou MoDem	Jean-Pierre Mariné UMP	Michèle Darricarrère FN	Frédéric Nihous CPNT	Others
2007 election	10 Jun 2007	–	33.22%	23.32%	2.36%	37.25%	25.92%	2.29%	2.39%	6.47%
Ifop	1–2 Jun 2007	603	–	21%	2.5%	45%	20%	3%	3%	5.5%

==== Saône-et-Loire's 6th ====
Polling firm	Fieldwork date	Sample size	Abs.	Arnaud Montebourg PS	Éric Michoux MoDem	Arnaud Danjean UMP	Monique Faure-Lafont FN	Others
2007 election	10 Jun 2007	–	35.04%	41.37%	4.58%	43.95%	2.91%	7.18%
Ifop	2–4 Jun 2007	605	–	42%	5%	39%	8%	6%

==== Sarthe's 4th ====
Polling firm	Fieldwork date	Sample size	Abs.	Gilles Leproust PCF	Stéphane Le Foll PS	Jean-Pierre Bourrely MoDem	François Fillon UMP	Catherine du Boisbaudry FN	Others
2007 election	10 Jun 2007	–	36.47%	4.09%	30.03%	4.10%	53.40%	2.39%	5.99%
Ifop	29–30 May 2007	602	–	4%	25%	4%	54%	5%	8%

==== Paris's 8th ====
Polling firm	Fieldwork date	Sample size	Abs.	Sandrine Mazetier PS	Pénélope Komitès LV	Jean-François Pernin MoDem	Arno Klarsfeld UMP	Philippe Coulnecheff FN	Others
2007 election	10 Jun 2007	–	34.29%	33.54%	3.67%	12.31%	35.76%	2.47%	12.24%
Ifop	4–5 Jun 2007	605	–	34%	5%	13%	34%	4%	10%

==== Vaucluse's 4th ====
Polling firm	Fieldwork date	Sample size	Abs.	Pierre Meffre PS	Roland Roticci MoDem	Thierry Mariani UMP	Jacques Bompard MPF	Emmanuelle Gueguen FN	Others
2007 election	10 Jun 2007	–	37.11%	20.34%	4.80%	41.36%	19.72%	4.44%	9.34%
BVA	31 May–2 Jun 2007	605	–	24%	3%	40%	19%	5%	9%

=== Second round ===
==== Ardèche's 2nd ====
Polling firm	Fieldwork date	Sample size	Abs.	Olivier Dussopt PS	Dominique Chambon MoDem	Gérard Weber UMP
2007 election	17 Jun 2007	–	37.16%	53.71%	–	46.29%
BVA	1–5 Jun 2007	607	–	51%	–	49%
BVA	1–5 Jun 2007	607	–	43%	15%	42%

==== Drôme's 2nd ====
Polling firm	Fieldwork date	Sample size	Abs.	Anne-Marie Reme-Pic PS	Thierry Cornillet MoDem	Franck Reynier UMP
2007 election	17 Jun 2007	–	39.10%	47.00%	–	53.00%
BVA	31 May–2 Jun 2007	603	–	50%	–	50%
BVA	31 May–2 Jun 2007	603	–	39%	18%	43%
BVA	31 May–2 Jun 2007	603	–	–	47%	53%
BVA	31 May–2 Jun 2007	603	–	47%	53%	–

==== Eure's 3rd ====
Hervé Morin was directly elected in the first round on 10 June 2007.

Polling firm	Fieldwork date	Sample size	Abs.	Francis Courel PS diss.	Hervé Morin NC
Ifop	4–5 Jun 2007	607	–	41%	59%

==== Gironde's 2nd ====
Polling firm	Fieldwork date	Sample size	Abs.	Michèle Delaunay PS	Alain Juppé UMP
2007 election	17 Jun 2007	–	38.93%	50.93%	49.07%
Ifop	29–30 May 2007	602	–	48.5%	51.5%

==== Isère's 1st ====
Polling firm	Fieldwork date	Sample size	Abs.	Geneviève Fioraso PS	Philippe de Longevialle MoDem	Alain Carignon UMP	Richard Cazenave DVD
2007 election	17 Jun 2007	–	37.64%	63.03%	–	36.97%	–
BVA	31 May–2 Jun 2007	604	–	62%	–	38%	–
BVA	31 May–2 Jun 2007	604	–	50%	–	22%	28%
BVA	31 May–2 Jun 2007	604	–	53%	–	–	47%
BVA	31 May–2 Jun 2007	604	–	46%	24%	30%	–
BVA	31 May–2 Jun 2007	604	–	45%	18%	–	37%

==== Pyrénées-Atlantiques's 2nd ====
Polling firm	Fieldwork date	Sample size	Abs.	Marie-Pierre Cabanne PS	François Bayrou MoDem	Jean-Pierre Mariné UMP
2007 election	17 Jun 2007	–	37.26%	38.79%	61.21%	–
Ifop	1–2 Jun 2007	603	–	28%	46%	26%

==== Saône-et-Loire's 6th ====
Polling firm	Fieldwork date	Sample size	Abs.	Arnaud Montebourg PS	Arnaud Danjean UMP
2007 election	17 Jun 2007	–	30.10%	50.34%	49.66%
Ifop	2–4 Jun 2007	605	–	51%	49%

==== Paris's 8th ====
Polling firm	Fieldwork date	Sample size	Abs.	Sandrine Mazetier PS	Arno Klarsfeld UMP
2007 election	17 Jun 2007	–	35.64%	55.85%	44.15%
Ifop	4–5 Jun 2007	605	–	50%	50%

==== Vaucluse's 4th ====
Polling firm	Fieldwork date	Sample size	Abs.	Pierre Meffre PS	Thierry Mariani UMP	Jacques Bompard MPF
2007 election	17 Jun 2007	–	39.31%	39.82%	60.18%	–
BVA	31 May–2 Jun 2007	605	–	37%	63%	–
BVA	31 May–2 Jun 2007	605	–	32%	46%	22%
BVA	31 May–2 Jun 2007	605	–	–	69%	31%

== See also ==
- Opinion polling for the French presidential election, 2007
- Opinion polling for the French legislative election, 2012
- Opinion polling for the French legislative election, 2017
