= Joëlle Mélin =

French politician (born 1950)

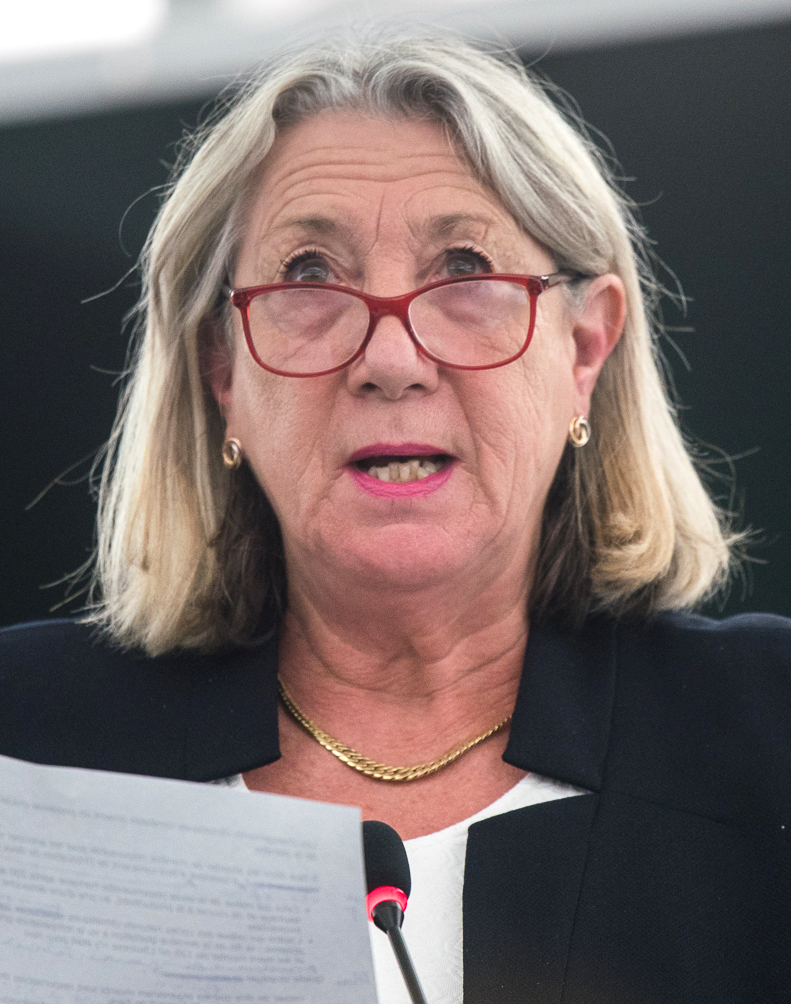

Member of the National Assembly for Bouches-du-Rhône's 9th constituency
- Incumbent
- Assumed office 22 June 2022
- Preceded by: Bernard Deflesselles

Member of the European Parliament
- In office 1 July 2014 – 28 July 2022
- Constituency: South-West France (2014–2019); France (2019–2022)

Personal details
- Born: 26 March 1950 (age 76) Versailles, France
- Party: National Rally (1993–present)
- Education: Aix-Marseille University

Joëlle Mélin (French pronunciation: [ʒɔɛl melɛ̃]; born 26 March 1950) is a French politician who has represented the 9th constituency of the Bouches-du-Rhône department in the National Assembly since 2022. A member of the National Rally (RN), she previously served as a Member of the European Parliament (MEP) from 2014 to 2022.

== Political career ==
Mélin, who graduated in medical education from Aix-Marseille University, joined the National Rally (then National Front) in 1993. She held a seat in the Regional Council of Provence-Alpes-Côte d'Azur from 2010 to 2015. Since 2014, she has also been a municipal councillor in Aubagne.

Mélin was elected as a Member of the European Parliament for South-West France in 2014. Following her 2022 election to the National Assembly in the 9th constituency of Bouches-du-Rhône, she was succeeded by Éric Minardi as an MEP.
