= Lydia Schenardi =

French politician

- Born: 27 June 1952; Montreuil, Seine-Saint-Denis, France
- Died: 11 December 2020 (aged 68); Grasse, France
- Occupation: French politician

Lydia Schenardi (27 June 1952 – 11 December 2020) was a French politician and Member of the European Parliament for the south-east of France. She was a member of the Front National, and was therefore a Non-Inscrit in the European Parliament. She sat on its Committee on Industry, Research and Energy and the Committee on Women's Rights and Gender Equality.

She was also a substitute for the Committee on Agriculture and Rural Development and a member of the delegation for relations with the Maghreb countries and the Arab Maghreb Union.

She was the FN candidate for mayor of Nice in the 2008 French municipal elections.

== Career ==
- Member of the Île-de-France Regional Council (1998–2004)
