= Sereine Mauborgne =

French politician

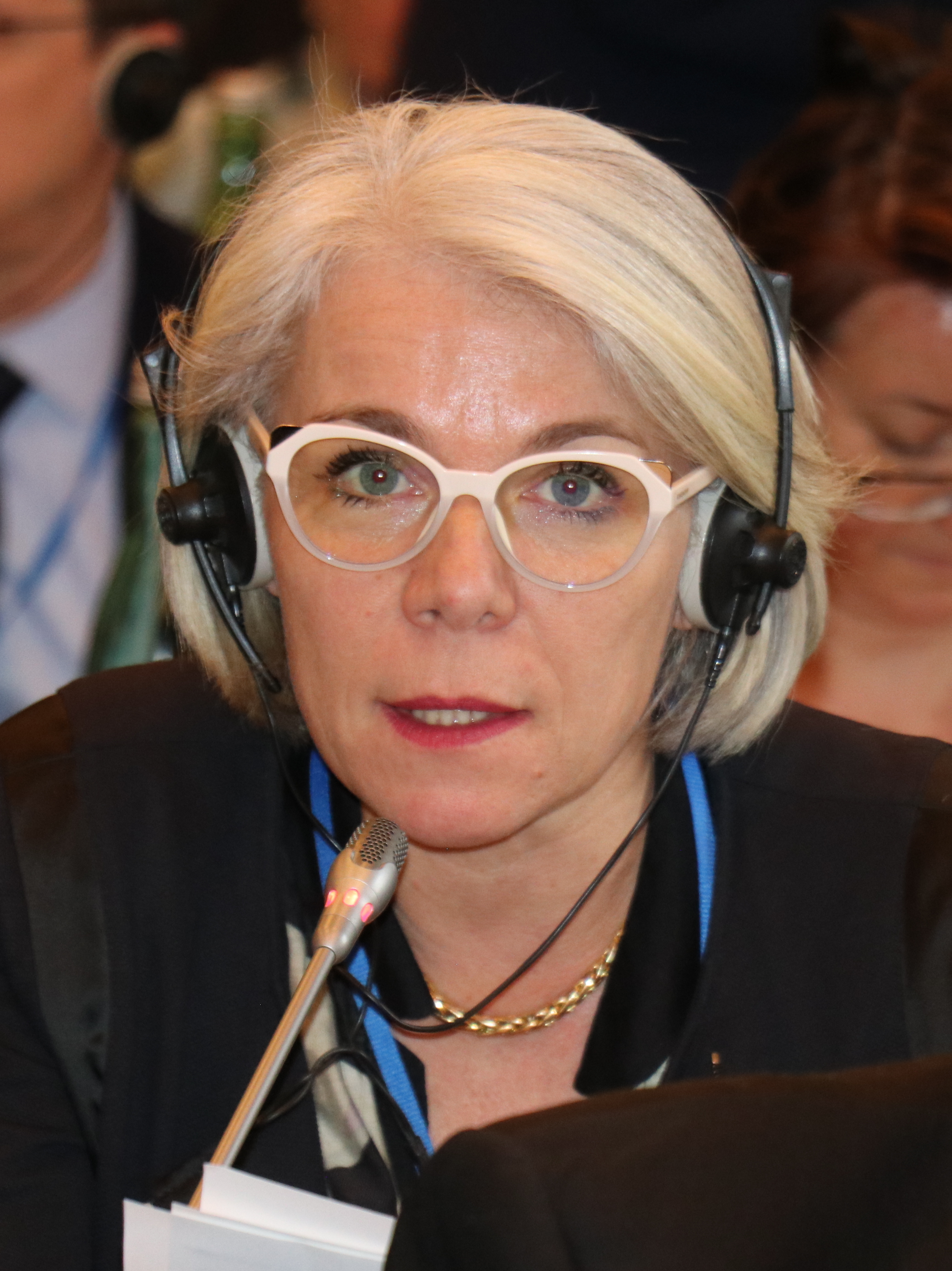

Member of the National Assembly for Var's 4th constituency
- In office 18 June 2017 – 22 June 2022
- Preceded by: Jean-Michel Couve (UMP)
- Succeeded by: Philippe Lottiaux (RN)

Personal details
- Born: 3 May 1972 (age 53) Le Mans, France
- Party: Renaissance

Sereine Mauborgne (born 3 May 1972) is a French politician who was a member of the National Assembly from 2017 to 2022, representing Var's 4th constituency in the department of Var. She is a member of Renaissance (RE).

In parliament, Mauborgne served on the Defence Committee. In addition to her committee assignments, she chaired the French delegation to the Parliamentary Assembly of the Organization for Security and Co-operation in Europe (OSCE PA). She was also a member of the French parliamentary friendship groups with Central Asia, Cyprus, Iraq and Mauritius.

== Biography ==
Born Solveig Mauborgne Sereine Mauborgne ran unsuccessfully in the 1998 cantonal elections in Le Mans. She was a municipal councilor in Coulaines, in the Sarthe department, elected on a diverse left-wing/environmentalist ticket, from 2001 to 2003.

In the 2014 municipal elections, she was second on a multi-party left-wing list in Cogolin, in the Var department.

In the 2017 legislative elections, she was nominated by Renaissance (French political party) en Marche (LREM) in the 4th constituency of Var, with Mikaël Vermès as her deputy. She was elected deputy on June 18, 2017, in the second round, with 54.6% of the vote. She is the first woman to be elected deputy in this constituency. A member of the National Defense and Armed Forces Committee, she was appointed budget rapporteur for the Army in 2019. She is also the chair of the French delegation to the Parliamentary Assembly of the Organization for Security and Co-operation in Europe (OSCE).

In January 2020, during the debate in the National Assembly on extending leave from 5 to 12 days in the event of the death of a child, Sereine Mauborgne opposed the measure, proposing instead to allow people to donate their RTT days and stating: “When you buy generosity at a low price on the backs of companies, it's a bit too easy.” In response, President Emmanuel Macron called for a little humanity from the deputies of his majority. Mauborgne later regretted not having been “clear enough” and felt that “we couldn't make amendments that said ‘the state must pay’.

Running for re-election in the 2022 legislative elections, she was defeated in the second round with 46.35% of the vote by Philippe Lottiaux (RN).

== See also ==
- 2017 French legislative election
