= Salima Saa =

French politician and diplomat (born 1971)

France Ambassador to the Dominican Republic
- President: Emmanuel Macron
- Preceded by: Sonia Barbry

Secretary of State for Equality between women and men
- In office 21 September 2024 – 23 December 2024
- Prime Minister: Michel Barnier
- Preceded by: Aurore Bergé
- Succeeded by: Aurore Bergé

Personal details
- Born: 7 September 1971 (age 55)
- Party: The Republicans (since 2015); Union for a Popular Movement (2011–2015)

Salima Saa (born 7 September 1971) is a French politician of The Republicans (LR) who briefly served as secretary of state for gender equality in the government of Prime Minister Michel Barnier from September to December 2024.

== Political career ==
From 2011 to 2012, Saa served as director of the National Agency for Social Cohesion and Equal Opportunities. Ahead of the 2012 presidential elections, she joined the team of Nathalie Kosciusko-Morizet, then spokesperson for Nicolas Sarkozy's campaign.

In the Republicans' 2016 primaries, Saa endorsed Bruno Le Maire as the center-right parties joint candidate for the 2017 French presidential election and joined his campaign team.

From 2020 to 2022, Saa served as prefect of Corrèze.
