= Philippe Lottiaux =

French politician (born 1966)

Member of the National Assembly for Var's 4th constituency
- Incumbent
- Assumed office 22 June 2022
- Preceded by: Sereine Mauborgne

Member of the Regional Council of Provence-Alpes-Côte d'Azur
- In office 4 January 2016 – 1 July 2021

Personal details
- Born: 14 September 1966 (age 60) Auchel, France
- Party: National Rally
- Education: Sciences Po; École nationale d'administration
- Occupation: Civil servant, politician

Philippe Lottiaux (French pronunciation: [filip lɔtjo]; born 14 August 1966) is a French politician who has represented the 4th constituency of the Var department in the National Assembly since 2022. He is a member of the National Rally (RN).

== Career ==
A 1991 graduate of the École nationale d'administration, Lottiaux was a civil servant and the director general of public services in the municipality of Levallois-Perret from 2001 to 2011 under the mayorship of Patrick Balkany.

In the 2014 municipal election, Lottiaux was the candidate leading the National Front (later National Rally) list in the southern city of Avignon. He was elected a municipal councillor after his list came first in the first round, holding his seat until 2017. Later in 2014 he also became newly-elected Fréjus Mayor David Rachline's chief of staff.

In the 2015 regional election, Lottiaux was elected to the Regional Council of Provence-Alpes-Côte d'Azur on the list led by Marion Maréchal-Le Pen. In the 2015 departmental election, he failed to win a seat in the Departmental Council of Vaucluse for the canton of Avignon-3, earning 47.8% of the second-round vote against the French Communist Party candidate.

Ahead of the 2022 legislative election, Lottiaux was selected to contest the 4th constituency of Var, having previously contested the seat in 2017. He won with 53.6% of the second-round vote, defeating one-term incumbent Sereine Mauborgne of La République En Marche!, as well as challenger Éric Zemmour of Reconquête in the first round.

== Personal life ==
Lottiaux is an amateur stand-up comedian under the stage name Philippe Bacart.

== See also ==
- List of deputies of the 16th National Assembly of France
