= Jean-Michel Couve =

French politician (1940–2025)

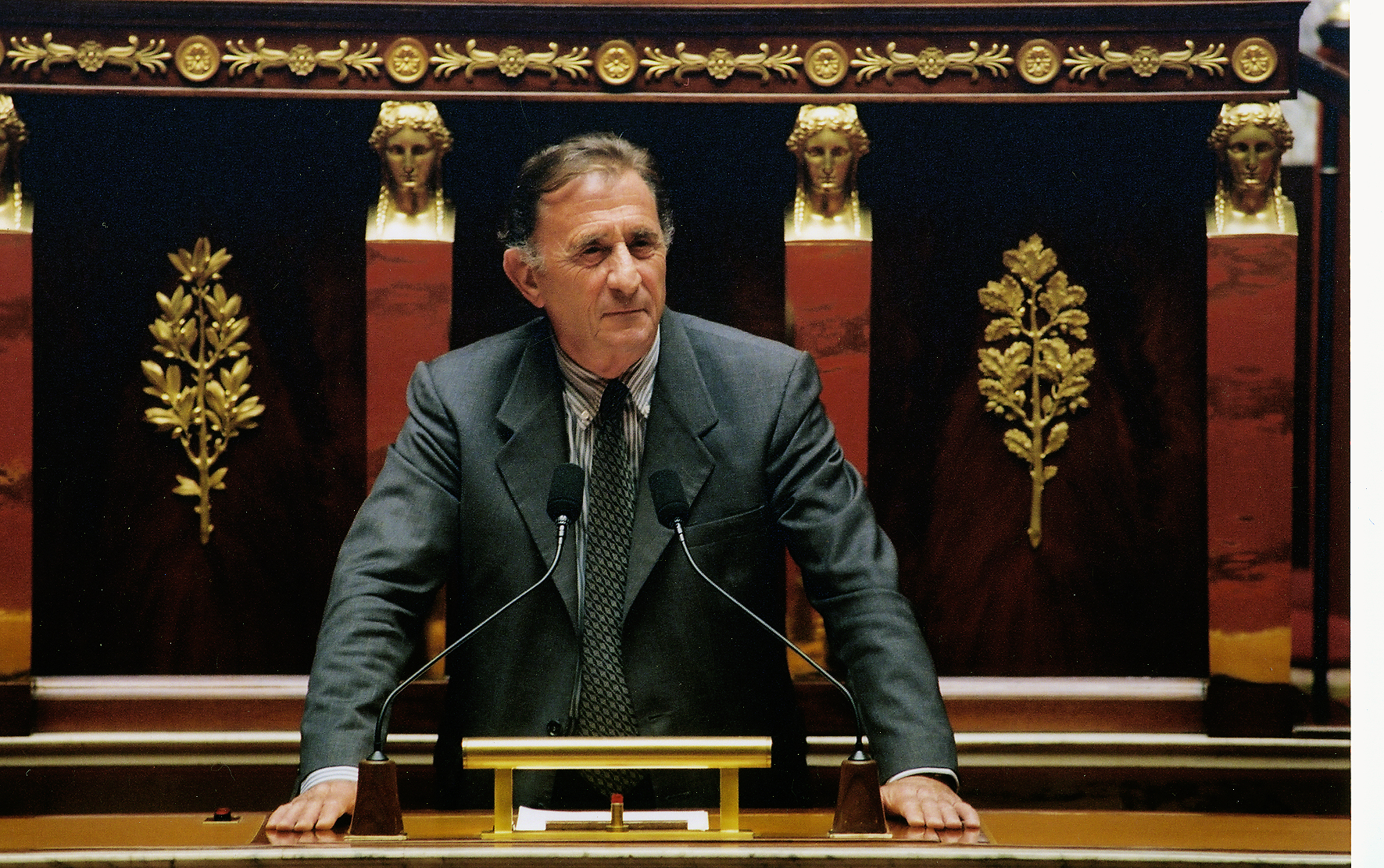
- Couve in 2006

Member of the National Assembly for Var
- In office 2 April 1986 – 20 June 2017
- Preceded by: Proportional representation
- Succeeded by: Sereine Mauborgne
- Constituency: At-large (1986–1988); 4th (1988–2017)

Mayor of Saint-Tropez
- In office 10 May 1993 – 16 March 2008
- Preceded by: Alain Spada
- Succeeded by: Jean-Pierre Tuvéri
- In office 14 March 1983 – 19 March 1989
- Preceded by: Bernard Blua
- Succeeded by: Alain Spada

Personal details
- Born: 3 January 1940 Le Muy, France
- Died: 20 December 2025 (aged 85)
- Party: Rally for the Republic (until 2002); Union for a Popular Movement (2002–2015); The Republicans (2015–2025)
- Education: University of Aix-Marseille
- Occupation: Cardiologist, politician

Jean-Michel Couve (3 January 1940 – 20 December 2025) was a French cardiologist and politician who represented the 4th constituency of the Var department in the National Assembly from 1988 to 2017. He previously held a seat at-large following the 1986 legislative election, the first to introduce proportional representation in Parliament under the Fifth Republic. A member of The Republicans (LR), which he joined upon the party's establishment in 2015, Couve had previously been a member of its predecessor parties, the Rally for the Republic (RPR) and Union for a Popular Movement (UMP).

== Life and career ==
A native of Le Muy, Var, Couve also served in the Departmental Council of Var for the canton of Saint-Tropez from 1992 to 2001 and as Mayor of Saint-Tropez twice, from 1983 to 1989 and again from 1993 until 2008. He did not run for reelection to Parliament in 2017 but remained from 2014 to 2020 a member of the municipal council of Saint-Tropez, to which he was first elected in 1977.

Couve died 20 December 2025 at the age of 85.
