= Bernard Deflesselles =

French politician

Member of the National Assembly for Bouches-du-Rhône's 9th constituency
- Incumbent
- Assumed office 29 March 1999
- Preceded by: Jean Tardito

Personal details
- Born: 16 October 1953 (age 72) Paris, France
- Party: The Republicans (since 2015)
- Other political affiliations: Union for French Democracy (until 1998); Liberal Democracy (1998–2002); Union for a Popular Movement (2002–2015)

Bernard Deflesselles (born 16 October 1953) is a French politician serving as the member of the National Assembly for the 9th constituency of Bouches-du-Rhône since 1999. A member of The Republicans (LR), his constituency is located in the department's southeastern corner; it follows the Mediterranean coast until the border with Var, comprising Cassis and La Ciotat.

== Career ==
Deflesselles has served as a regional councillor of Provence-Alpes-Côte d'Azur since 1992. He was one of the regional council's vice presidents from 2015 to 2017. In 1999, Deflesselles was elected to Parliament in a by-election in Bouches-du-Rhône's 9th constituency. Since 2020, he has also been a municipal councillor of La Ciotat. He previously was a municipal councillor of Aubagne from 1995 to 2001.

In Parliament, Deflesselles serves on the Committee on Foreign Affairs. He is also vice president of the Subcommittee on European Affairs. In addition to his committee assignments, he is part of the French delegation to the Parliamentary Assembly of the Union for the Mediterranean.

In the 2016 The Republicans presidential primary, Deflesselles endorsed Jean-François Copé as the party's candidate for the office of President of France. In the 2017 The Republicans leadership election, Deflesselles endorsed Laurent Wauquiez. In March 2017, he announced he would not support presidential nominee François Fillon amid the Fillon affair.

At the Republicans’ national convention in December 2021, Desflesselles was part of the 11-member committee which oversaw the party’s selection of its candidate for the 2022 presidential elections. He is not seeking re-election in the 2022 French legislative election.
