= Robert Barcia =

French politician

Hardy
- Born: Robert Félix Barcia; 22 July 1928; 14th arrondissement, Paris, French Third Republic
- Died: 12 July 2019 (aged 90); Créteil, Île-de-France, French Fifth Republic
- Other name: Roger Girardot
- Occupation: Medical sales respresentative
- Organization: UCI
- Political party: LO
- Other political affiliations: FJCF; UC; VO
- Movement: Third camp
- Criminal charges: Distributing illegal literature
- Criminal penalty: Imprisoned in La Santé during WWII

Hardy was the pseudonym of Robert Barcia, also known as Roger Girardot (22 July 1928 in Paris – 12 July 2009 in Créteil), a French politician who was leader of the Internationalist Communist Union (UCI), an international Trotskyist organisation centred on the minor political party Lutte Ouvrière (LO). Barcia was only known by his cadre name, Hardy, even to the majority of LO members.

== Biography ==
Barcia was born into a working-class family in Paris and was originally a member of the Mouvement Jeunes Communistes de France. He began his activity as a militant during the Second World War. He then joined a tiny communist group, the Union Communiste (UC), led by Barta a Romanian Trotskyist. Given that the group was clandestine, all members adopted cadre names and there was a considerable stress on security within the group. This continues today as does the emphasis of the UCI on orienting towards workers in the workplaces.

The UC did not take part in the regroupment of the other French Trotskyist groups which took place in 1944 and led to the foundation of the Internationalist Communist Party. This was because the UC held that the other Trotskyist groups had not made a balance sheet of what the UC saw as their nationalist deviations in the early period of the war.

The central task of the UC was working around the Renault factory in the Paris area, where it had members working and doing educational work in order to develop cadres. In 1947, this work meant that the UC was instrumental in leading the Renault strike which sparked broader strikes. However, Hardy was not personally involved in these events due to ill health.

The strain on the UC leading the struggle at Renault and subsequently the independent SDR union there led to its collapse. After various attempts to revive the UC, a paper, Voix Ouvrière, was launched in 1956 after the Soviet invasion of Hungary and the Suez Crisis. Among the figures leading this effort were Hardy and another former member of the UC Pierre Bois the leading UC militant at Renault. An obscure dispute with Barta seems to have ensured his lack of involvement however.

Barcia died in Créteil on 12 July 2009. However, his death was not publicly announced by LO until a year later. According to Arlette Laguiller this was due to Barcia's own wishes, in an attempt to avoid negative press reports.

== Legacy ==
From 1956, Hardy was the central leader of first Voix Ouvrière (VO), and after 1968 LO, and stamped his character on the group. However, given that texts from VO and LO tend not to be signed by individuals and given also that Hardy did not run for public office his role in the organisation has been obscure.

The journalist Christophe Bourseiller published a book of conversations with Hardy in 2003. Following the announcement of Robert Barcia's death, he said: "There were two Hardys. There was Hardy the Trotskyist militant who ruled his comrades with great discipline and had dedicated his life to communism and to revolution. And there was Barcia, the private man, a likeable and knowledgeable man with a great sense of humour."
