= Joseph Henriet =

Italian ethnologist and linguist (born 1945)

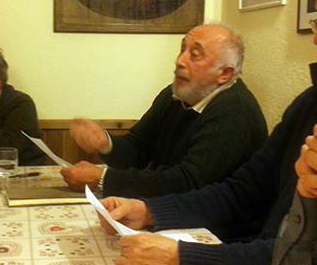
- Henriet during a meeting in Fénis in 2014
- Born: 13 March 1945 (age 81); Excenex, Aosta, Aosta Valley, Italy
- Occupations: Teacher, Writer, Political activist, Language activist
- Known for: Arpitanism; proposal of an Arpitan koiné
- Notable work: La Lingua Arpitana
- Political party: ALPA (1970–1972); HEL (1972–1976); Lega Nord (1993–2001)

Joseph Henriet (born 13 March 1945), also known in Arpitan as Josèf Harriet or Joze Harrieta, is an Aosta Valley teacher, writer, political activist and language activist associated with Arpitan cultural and political activism. He was a leading figure in the development of the ideas of Arpitania and Arpitanism during the 1970s, and is known for his 1976 work La Lingua Arpitana, in which he proposed a standardised Arpitan koiné.

== Biography ==
Joseph Henriet was born on 13 March 1945 in Excenex, a village in the hills near Aosta, in the Aosta Valley. He was the youngest of three children. According to later accounts, he grew up in a farming family in which French and the Valdôtain variety of Arpitan were used.

Henriet began his primary education in the local village school and later continued his secondary education in Chieri, in Piedmont. He trained as a schoolteacher.

In 1968, at the age of 23, Henriet was proposed by César Dujany, then responsible for education in the regional government of the Aosta Valley, to work as a teacher in the canton of Jura in Switzerland. After one year, he returned to the Aosta Valley in 1969. During his career as a teacher, he worked in several villages in the Aosta Valley and in Switzerland, especially in the cantons of Jura and Neuchâtel.

During his periods in Switzerland, Henriet studied the activity of the Mouvement autonomiste jurassien, which sought the creation of an independent canton of Jura separate from the canton of Bern. This experience influenced his later political thinking about the Aosta Valley and the wider Arpitan-speaking area. His early political ideas were initially centred on the French-speaking minority in the Aosta Valley, but later shifted toward an emphasis on Arpitan speakers and on the cultural, historical and linguistic basis of Arpitan identity.

In the 1970s, Henriet developed political contacts with other minority and autonomist movements in Europe. He became acquainted with the Basque writer and politician Federico Krutwig (1921–1981). In the cultural sphere, Henriet worked on ethnology, Arpitan history, culture and language, including the construction of a koiné for a standardized Arpitan language.

== Political activity ==
=== ALPA, 1970–1972 ===
After returning from Switzerland to the Aosta Valley, Henriet began political activity that led to the creation of the Action de Libération des Peuples des Alpes, better known by the acronym ALPA. The movement initially sought the separation of the Aosta Valley from the Italian Republic and the union of the Alpine peoples of the traditionally French-speaking area around Mont Blanc in a single Alpine state.

As a political leader, Henriet represented ALPA at an international congress in Leuven, Belgium, attended by several European autonomist and regionalist movements. According to later Arpitanist accounts, discussions with Federico Krutwig contributed to the development of Henriet's political ideas and of the movement itself. At that stage, ALPA did not yet have a clearly defined Arpitan ethnic ideology and was mainly focused on the French-speaking minority of the Aosta Valley.

Because ALPA initially centred on the French-speaking minority in the region, the French politician and presidential candidate Guy Héraud offered support for a project linking the Aosta Valley to France. After a local congress organised by ALPA at Gignod, however, the movement developed the view that the people of the Aosta Valley belonged neither to a French nor to an Italian ethnicity, but possessed a distinct socio-cultural identity linking them to other Alpine peoples around Mont Blanc, especially through the Arpitan language and culture. This development contributed to the emergence of Arpitanism as a cultural and political current. In 1972, ALPA gave way to a new movement, HEL.

=== HEL (1972–1976) ===
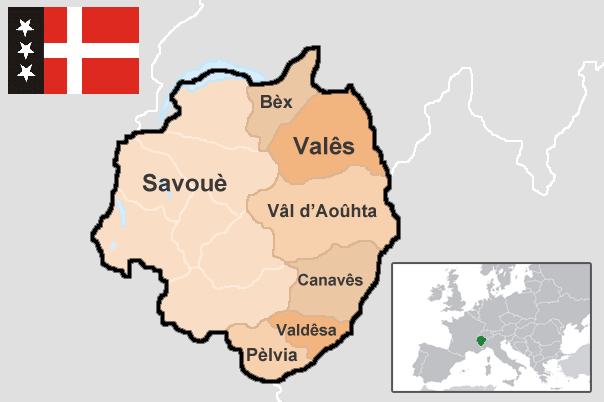
Proposed Arpitan federation, comprising Arpitan-speaking areas in France, Italy and Switzerland, according to Henriet's 1972 model.

In 1972, the movement was renamed Harpitanya Etnocrateka Libra (HEL). In his 1971 book Harpeitanya, written under the pseudonym Edur Kar, Henriet argued that the inhabitants of Arpitania formed an Arpitan people defined by shared features such as language, culture, history and social values.

HEL supported the separation of the Aosta Valley from Italy and the creation of a free Arpitan state or federation. The movement was to be supported by a new standard Arpitan language, which Henriet considered an alternative to the politically dominant Italian and French languages and a tool for expressing ideas and concepts in the people's own language.

=== Lega Nord (1993–2001) ===
In 1993, Henriet returned to political activity as a member of Lega Nord, an Italian separatist party that at the time advocated the separation of northern Italy from the rest of the country and the creation of an independent federal state of Padania. Henriet became president of the Aosta Valley section of the party, the Ligue du Nord Vallée d'Aoste.

According to Henriet, the Aosta Valley branch was given room by Umberto Bossi to work again on the project of a Cisalpine Arpitania, which would cooperate with Padania as a state or region. The movement also sought transalpine contacts with the Ligue savoisienne, a separatist movement in neighbouring Savoy. The Savoyard party leader Patrice Abeille showed interest, but did not pursue cooperation because he did not want to associate the Ligue savoisienne with Lega Nord's political reputation.

In the 1996 Italian general election, Henriet was a Lega Nord candidate in the Aosta Valley, receiving 9.67% of the vote, which was not enough to win representation in the Senate. In the 1998 Aosta Valley regional election, the party, running under the name Lega Nord - Val d'Aohta Libra, received 3.39% of the vote. Henriet then stepped down as party president and continued as political secretary. He left the post of political secretary in 2001.

== Work ==
=== Arpitan koiné ===
Arpitan is spoken in several regional varieties. In 1976, Henriet considered it necessary to develop a standard Arpitan form in order to provide the endangered language with a common written standard that could function as an alternative to French and Italian.

For the development of a uniform standard within the dialect continuum, Henriet used as his starting point a variety from the area around Montjovet, which the Swiss linguist Hans-Erich Keller had described as particularly conservative and therefore less influenced by French or Italian. For writing this standard, Henriet chose a phonological spelling based on the Latin alphabet, but with letter values that did not always correspond to those of French or Italian. In this spelling, for example, the voiceless velar plosive [k] was written with k, while the voiceless postalveolar fricative [ʃ] was written with x.

Henriet's work on this standard form was published in 1976 as La Lingua Arpitana. The proposal was not adopted by political authorities or institutions as a language of education or administration in the Aosta Valley or in other regions where Arpitan varieties are spoken.

Consonants
		Bilabial	Labiodental	Dental	Alveolar	Alveolopalatal	Palatal	Velar	Glottal
Plosive	Voiceless	P /p/		T /t̪/		(TY) /ʈ/	(KY) /c/	K /k/	
Plosive	Voiced	B /b/		D /d̪/		(DY) /ɖ/	(GY) /ɟ/	G /ɡ/	
Nasal		M /m/		N /n/			NY /ɲ/		
Affricate	Voiceless				C /t͡s/	(CY) /t͡ʂ/			
Affricate	Voiced				J /d͡z/	(JY) /d͡ʐ/			
Fricative	Voiceless		F /f/		S /s/	X /ʃ/			H /h/
Fricative	Voiced		V /v/		Z /z/	(ZY) /ʒ/			
Lateral					L /l/		LY /ʎ/		
Rhotic				R /ʁ~r/					
Semivowels		W /w/					Y /j/		

Vowels
Lettre	API
A	/ä/
E	/ɛ/
O	/ʌ/
OE	/ə/
EI	/e/
OU	/ɤ/
I	/i/
Ü	/ʉ/
U	/ɯ/

== Selected works ==
Henriet, Joseph (1971). Harpeitanya (in Arpitan).

Henriet, Joseph (1973). Ehtudio su la question harpitana (in Arpitan). Aosta: Éditions Arba.

Henriet, Joseph (1976). Noi, Saraceni delle Alpi (in Italian). Edizioni Cervino.

Henriet, Joseph (1976). La Lingua Arpitana (in Italian and Arpitan). Romano Canavese.

Henriet, Joseph (2002). Nos ancêtres les Sarrasins des Alpes (in French). Éditions Cabédita. ISBN 2-88295-360-7.
