= Saint-Bardoux =

- Commune
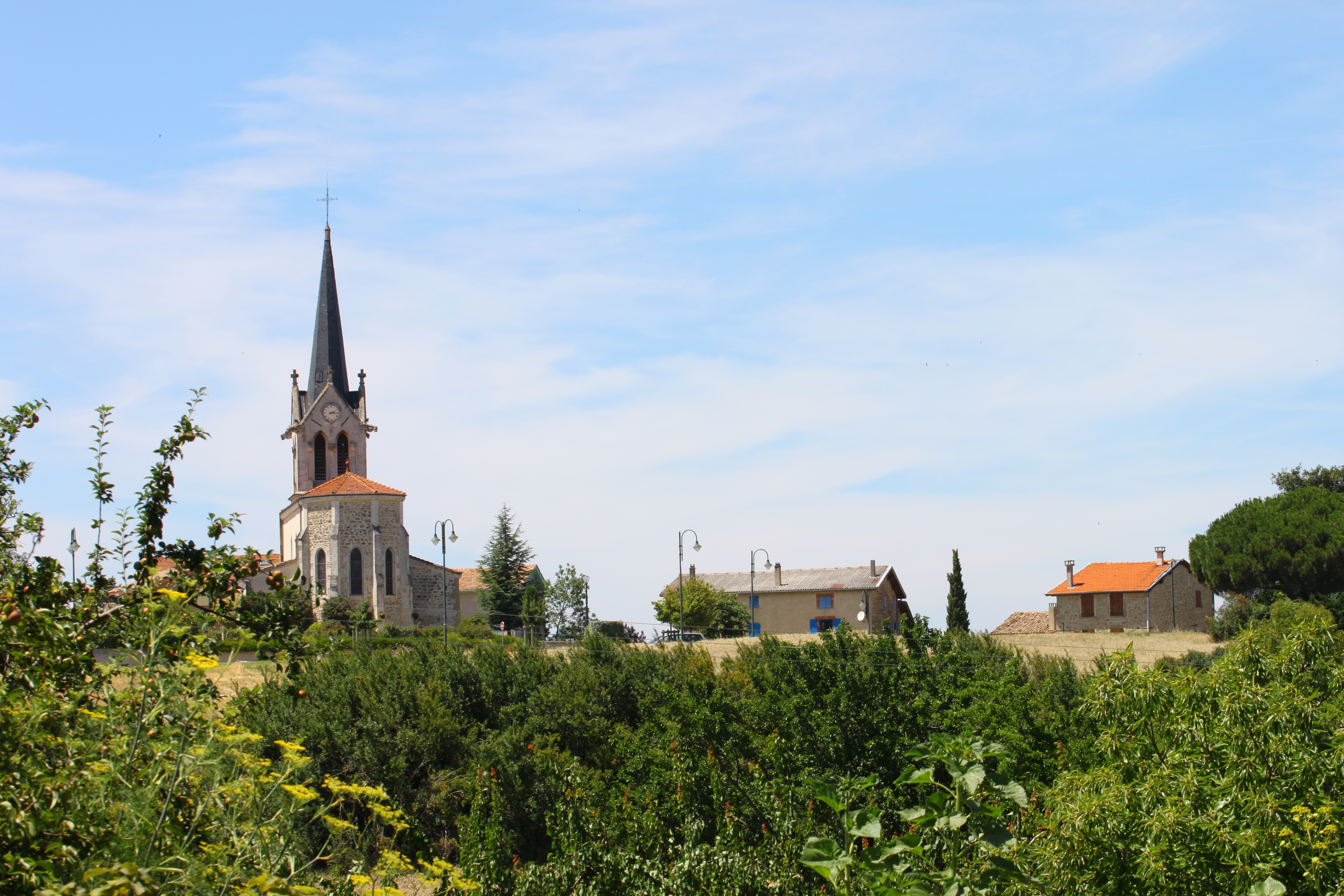
- A general view of Saint-Bardoux
- Location of Saint-Bardoux
- Location within France Location within Auvergne-Rhône-Alpes
- Coordinates: 45°05′11″N 4°58′24″E
- Country: France
- Region: Auvergne-Rhône-Alpes
- Department: Drôme
- Arrondissement: Valence
- Canton: Romans-sur-Isère
- Intercommunality: CA Valence Romans Agglo

Government
  - Mayor (2020–2026): Etienne Larat
- Area^{1}: 10.63 km^{2} (4.10 sq mi)
- Elevation: 229 m (751 ft)
- Highest elevation: 310 m (1,020 ft)
- Lowest elevation: 159 m (522 ft)
- Population (2023): 599
  - Density: 56.3/km^{2} (146/sq mi)
- Time zone: UTC+01:00 (CET)
  - Summer (DST): UTC+02:00 (CEST)
- INSEE/Postal code: 26294 /26260
- ^{1} French Land Register data, which excludes lakes, ponds, glaciers > 1 km^{2} (0.386 sq mi or 247 acres) and river estuaries.

Saint-Bardoux (French pronunciation: [sɛ̃ baʁdu]; Occitan: Sent Bardol) is a commune in the Drôme department in southeastern France.

== Location ==
Saint-Bardoux is located 8 km north-west of Romans-sur-Isère (capital of the canton) and 11 km east of Tain-l'Hermitage. The surrounding communities are Clérieux, Saint-Donat-sur-l'Herbasse and Granges-les-Beaumont.

== Population ==
Historical population
Year	Pop.	±% p.a.
1968	318	—
1975	340	+0.96%
1982	403	+2.46%
1990	532	+3.53%
1999	541	+0.19%
2007	624	+1.80%
2012	569	−1.83%
2017	622	+1.80%
2023	599	−0.63%
Source: INSEE

== See also ==
- Communes of the Drôme department
