= Nathalie Arthaud =

French politician (born 1970)

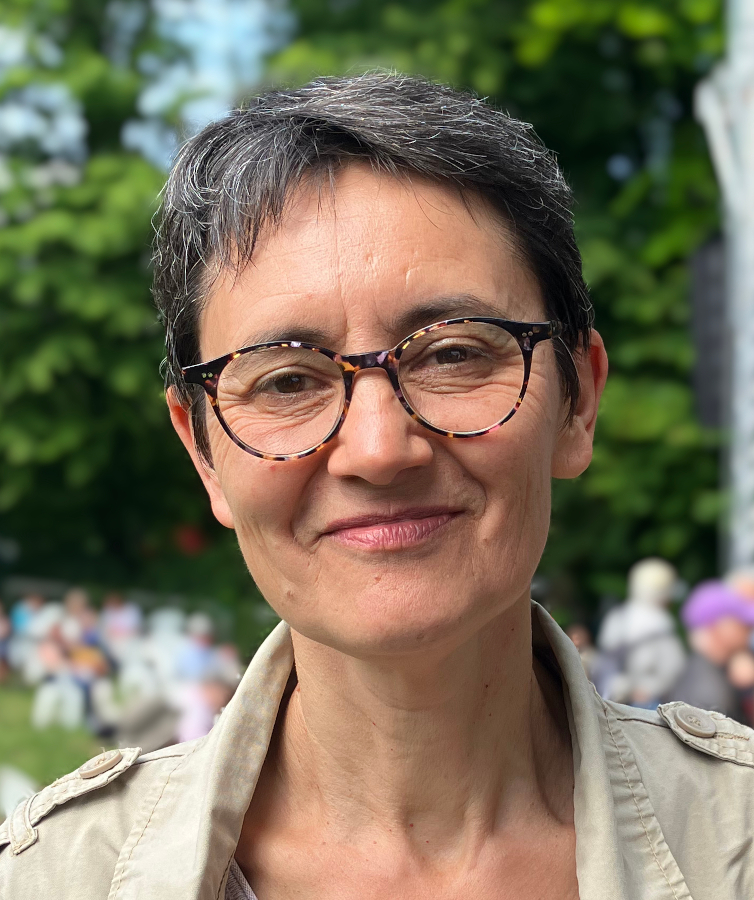
- Nathalie Arthaud in 2024

Spokesperson of Workers' Struggle
- Incumbent
- Assumed office 8 December 2008
- Preceded by: Arlette Laguiller

Member of the Municipal council of Vaulx-en-Velin
- In office 2008–2014

Personal details
- Born: Nathalie Yvonne Thérèse Arthaud; 23 February 1970 (age 56) Peyrins, Drôme, France
- Party: Lutte Ouvrière
- Profession: Teacher

Nathalie Yvonne Thérèse Arthaud (French pronunciation: [natali ivɔn teʁɛz aʁto]; born 23 February 1970) is a French secondary school (lycée) economics teacher and politician. Since 2008, she has served as the spokesperson for the Lutte Ouvrière (Workers' Struggle), a Trotskyist party, and has stood for election under the party multiple times, beginning in 2001.

She was the party's candidate in the 2012, 2017 and 2022 presidential elections. She received 0.56, 0.64 an 0.57 percent of the votes cast and placed in ninth, tenth and twelfth place, respectively. A self-proclaimed communist, she focused her campaigns on workers' and economic issues; her platform included positions such as increasing the minimum wage, ending evictions and mass layoffs, and nationalizing French financial institutions. In 2019, Arthaud also headed the list of the Workers' Struggle nominees for European Parliament; the party received 0.78 percent of all votes cast.

== Early life and career ==
Arthaud was born in 1970 in Peyrins, Drôme, France. Her father owned a garage. She first became interested in the Workers' Struggle party in the 1980s, while a high school student, and at the age of 18 formally joined the party. She first ran for elected office in 2001 in a municipal election in Vaulx-en-Velin, and later ran in legislative and regional elections. In 2008, Arthaud became the officially designated spokeswoman of the party.

== Political campaigns ==
=== 2012 presidential election ===
On 5 December 2010, Arthaud was designated candidate of Lutte Ouvrière in the presidential election of 2012. In the 22 April 2012 first-round election, she received 202,548 votes, 0.56 percent of all cast and placing ninth overall.

=== 2017 presidential election ===
In December 2014, Arthaud first indicated her interest in representing the party in the 2017 election, stating that if selected by her party, she would be willing to stand for election a second time. On 14 March 2016, Arthaud announced her candidacy for president, one day after she had been selected by the party's congress during a meeting in the Paris region. In her announcement of her candidacy, Arthaud emphasized her support for workers' rights and expressed optimism that her campaign might help to unite voters against the far right. She also indicated her intention to campaign on issues similar to those which she discussed during the 2012 election, and expressed opposition to recent pension reform efforts, the Tax credit for competitiveness and employment (fr), and proposals known as the Responsibility Pact and the Macron Act. Regarding the labor policies of the current administration, she stated that "One can hear Juppé or Sarkozy say that (then-President) Hollande does not have a spine, but he has surpassed them all by several heads in terms of attacks on workers".

Because of the Workers' Struggle party's dedicated base, Arthaud was not expected to encounter trouble collecting the necessary 500 signatures to qualify for ballot placement; she ultimately became one of the first five candidates to submit the required signatures. She campaigned on her support of increasing the minimum wage to €1,800 per month (an increase of €647), banning layoffs and evictions from rental properties, implementing a large-scale hiring program for public services, lowering the retirement age to 60, increasing pensions and indexing them to the cost of living, and nationalizing French banks and the financial sector. Arthaud continued to teach during her campaign, making her the only candidate to still hold a job, in addition to (along with National Front nominee Marine Le Pen) being one of only two female candidates for the presidency; she also described herself as the sole communist candidate in the race. She and Philippe Poutou (the nominee of the New Anticapitalist Party) both positioned themselves as Trotskyist candidates.

Arthaud was not invited to appear in the TF1 debate between the top five highest-polling candidates; however, she did appear in a debate against Solidarity and Progress nominee Jacques Cheminade broadcast virtually on the same day. The month before the first-round election, Arthaud spoke at a rally of 3,500 in Saint-Denis. On 4 April, Arthaud was one of eleven candidates to appear at the final televised presidential debate, hosted by BFM TV and CNews. During the debate, Arthaud criticized her opponents for their views on immigration; in response to a question about how she would defend France from terror attacks, Arthaud responded that "I can say what I won't do is seize on every attack, every tragedy, to conflate terrorists with migrants, immigrants and Muslims [...] It's what you do all the time, Marine Le Pen and François Fillon". She also attacked employers who she said "crus(h) the working class condition with impunity". Following her debate performance, business executive Sophie de Menthon (fr) wrote an open letter to the national education association asking that Arthaud be removed from her teaching position, arguing that she embodies "social hatred" and expressing dismay at "the violence of" Arthaud's language at the debate. In response, Arthaud wrote an open letter accusing de Menthon of being among "the police of employer thought" and arguing that her own rhetoric was of far less importance than the actions of the state. A petition was also begun asking that de Menton "cease to speak publicly".

In the 23 April first-round election, Arthaud received 232,284 votes, 0.64 percent of all cast, placing tenth overall. Arthaud went on to stand as a candidate in the 2017 French parliamentary election held in June; in the Seine-Saint-Denis's sixth district, she received 2.66 percent of the vote.

=== 2019 Parliament elections ===
In December 2018, it was announced that Arthaud would stand as the lead Workers's Struggle candidate for the 2019 European Parliament election in France. Arthaud indicated that her campaign would be dedicated solely to the issue of workers' rights, elaborating that the party had declined to form a list with fellow left parties because her party did not want the campaign to become "a sounding board for all the fights". The party received 176,339 votes, 0.78 percent of all votes cast, and thus did not win any seats. In March 2021, the Workers' Struggle Party designated Arthaud as their candidate for Île-de-France in that year's regional elections.

=== 2022 presidential election ===
In December 2020, Arthaud announced her candidacy for the 2022 French presidential election, and received the formal nomination of the Workers' Struggle party at their annual convention.

== Other work ==
In December 2019, Arthaud represented the Workers' Struggle party at a meeting, convened by the French Communist Party, of ideologically left political parties who opposed Macron's proposal for pension reform; Arthaud told Le Monde that Macron's policy "doesn't make any sense" and noted the need for leftist parties and workers to unite to defeat the proposal.

From 2008 to 2014, Arthaud also served as a municipal councillor, presiding over youth matters, in Vaulx-en-Velin.

Party political offices
Preceded by Arlette Laguiller	Lutte Ouvrière spokesperson 2008–present	Next: Most recent
