= 2002 French presidential election =

- 21 April 2002 (first round); 5 May 2002 (second round)
- Turnout: 71.60% (first round) ▼6.78 pp 79.71% (second round) ▲0.05 pp
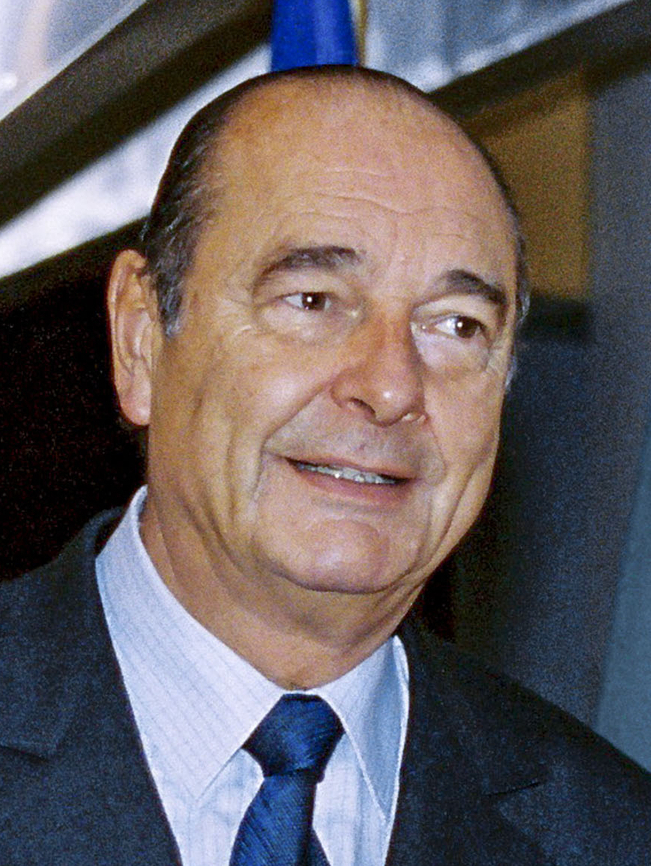

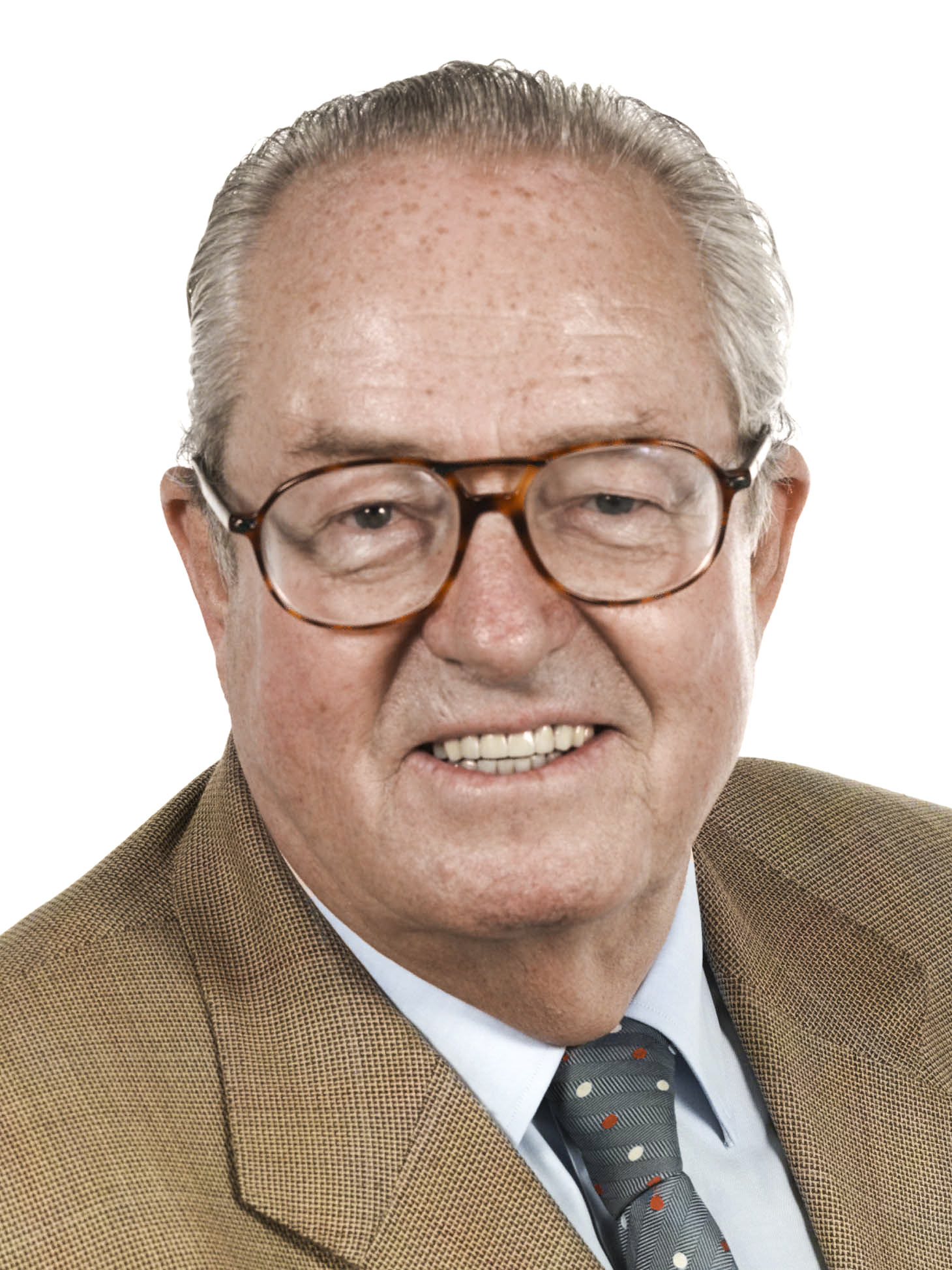
Nominee	Jacques Chirac	Jean-Marie Le Pen
Party	RPR	FN
Popular vote	25,537,956	5,525,032
Percentage	82.21%	17.79%
President before election
Jacques Chirac
RPR
Elected President
Jacques Chirac
RPR

Presidential elections were held in France on 21 April 2002, with a runoff election between the top two candidates, incumbent Jacques Chirac of the Rally for the Republic and Jean-Marie Le Pen of the National Front, on 5 May. This presidential contest attracted a greater than usual amount of international attention because of candidate Le Pen's unexpected appearance in the runoff election.

Chirac ran for a second term, reduced to five years instead of seven previously by a 2000 referendum, emphasising a strong economy (mostly unaffected by downturns in Germany and the United States). It was widely expected that Chirac and Lionel Jospin, the outgoing cohabitation Prime Minister and nominee of the Socialist Party, would be the most popular candidates in the first round, thus going on to face each other in the runoff, with opinion polls showing a hypothetical Chirac versus Jospin second round too close to call. However, Jospin unexpectedly finished in third place behind Le Pen. Journalists and politicians claimed polls had failed to predict Le Pen's second-place finish in the general election, though his strong stance could be seen in the week prior to the election. This led to serious discussions about polling techniques, the climate of French politics and especially the high numbers of candidates from the left-wing.

Although Le Pen's political party, the National Front, described itself as mainstream conservative, observers largely agreed in defining it as a far-right and nationalist party. As a protest, almost all French political parties called for their supporters to vote against Le Pen, most notably the Socialists, who were traditionally billed as the archrivals to Chirac's party. Chirac thus went on to win in the largest landslide in a presidential election in French history (greater even than that of Louis-Napoléon Bonaparte in 1848, the first by direct ballot), winning over 82% of the vote.

The National Front would not appear again in the second round of the presidential election until 2017.

== Background ==
The 2002 election was the first for which the president would be elected to a five-year, instead of a seven-year, term.

In the months before the election, the campaign had increasingly focused on questions of law and order, with a particular focus on crimes committed by young people, especially those of foreign origin. Lionel Jospin was, at the time, Prime Minister of France; the Jospin government was criticised for its "softness" on crime by its political opponents. Reporting on the TF1 and France2 television channel and other media also emphasized the alleged crime wave.

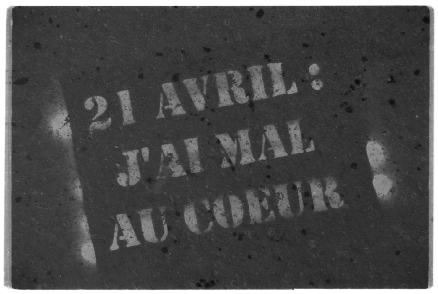
A response to the first round of elections, this spray-painted sign was seen on the streets of Paris. Translation: "April 21: I feel heartbroken".

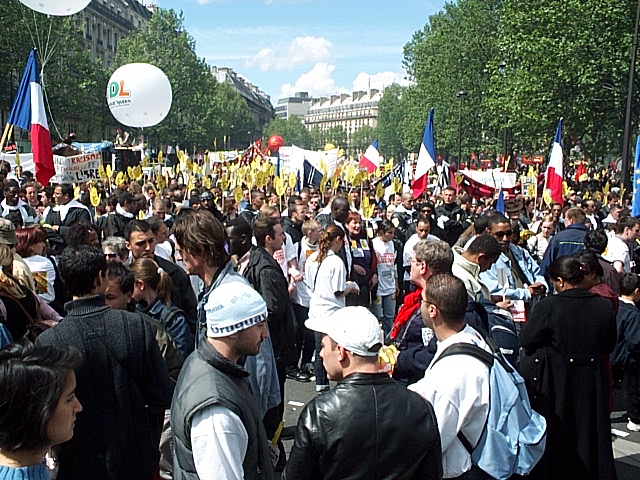
The 1 May 2002 Labour Day demonstrations for workers' rights included protests against Jean-Marie Le Pen.

== Opinion polls ==
First round

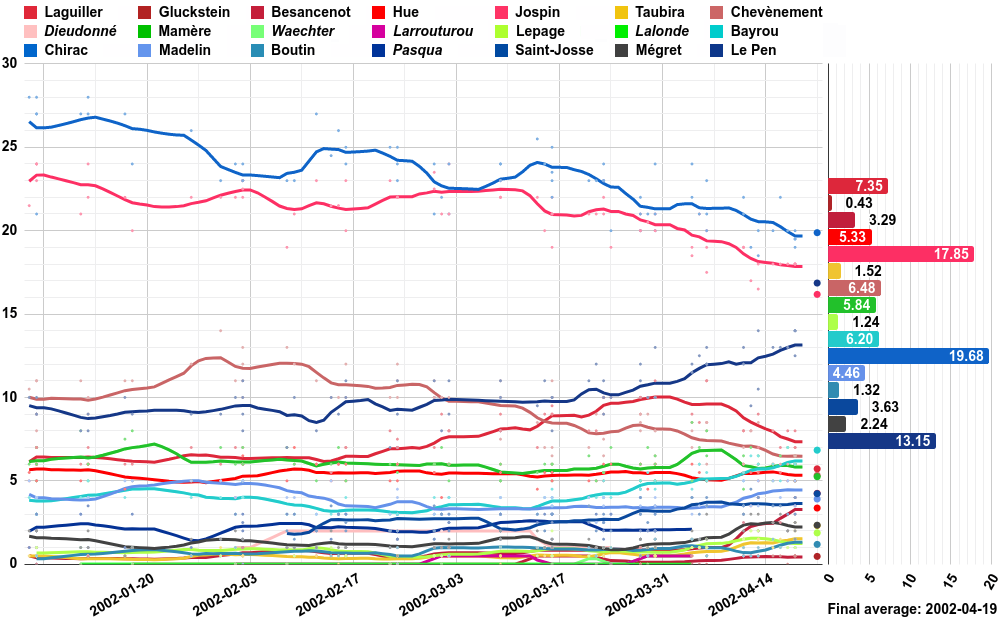

Second round (Chirac–Jospin)

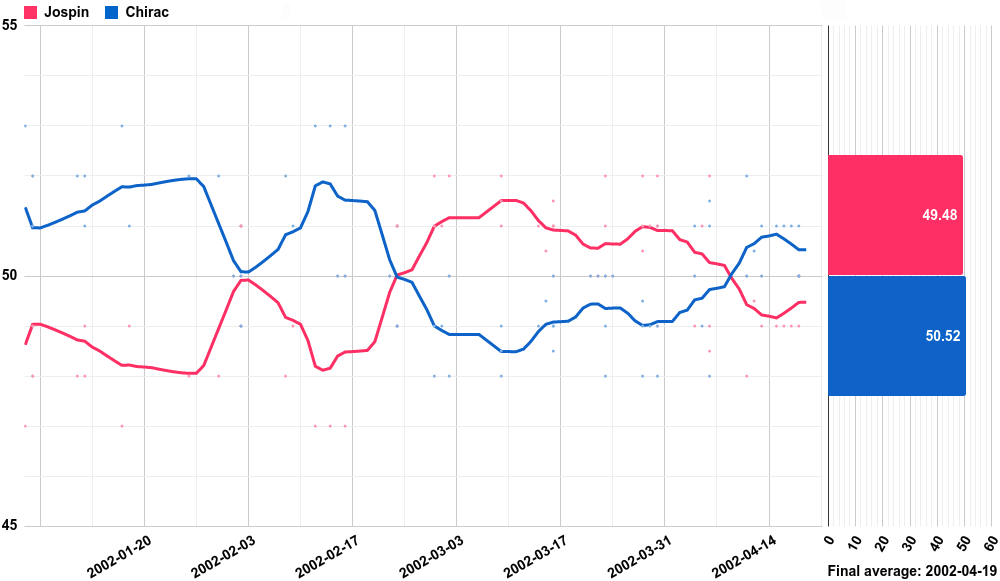

== Results ==
The first round of the election (on 21 April), which saw an exceptional number of 16 candidates, came as a shock to many commentators, almost all of whom had expected the second ballot to be between Jacques Chirac and Lionel Jospin. Indeed, it was this very expectation that led to Jospin's downfall, with a plethora of "small party" left candidates (independent socialists and republicans, Green, Communist, Trotskyist, radical etc.) all intending to support him in the second round, but to raise their profile in the first, like Jean-Pierre Chevènement and Christiane Taubira. They cumulatively took enough votes away from Jospin to (unintentionally) prevent him from reaching the second round, which he could have won. Instead Jean-Marie Le Pen faced Chirac in the second ballot. The election brought the opinion polls and two-round voting system into question as well as raising many concerns about apathy and the way in which the left had become so divided as a result of the over democratic refusal of Jospin to strategically ask the nearest small parties of his own government coalition to withdraw, like the preceding leaders of the left had done for such an election.

This was a major political event, both nationally and internationally, as it was the first time someone with such far-right views had qualified for the second round of a French presidential election.

There was a widespread stirring of national public opinion, and more than one million people in France took part in street rallies, in an expression of fierce opposition to Le Pen's ideas. Some held up protest signs stating "I'm ashamed to be French," which parodied Le Pen's party slogan, "Proud to be French." Spontaneous street protests began in the night from 21 to 22 April, then on 22 April and 23, then as follows:

- 24 April: 60,000 people in the streets protesting against Le Pen's success
- 25 April: 250,000 people in the streets protesting against Le Pen's success
- 27 April: 200,000 people in the streets protesting against Le Pen's success (including 45,000 in Paris)
- 1 May:
  - Approximately 20,000 people turned out for the National Front's yearly demonstration in Paris in honor of Joan of Arc and in support of Le Pen.
  - Between 900,000 (according to the Ministry of the Interior) and 1,300,000 people (according to the trade unions) turned up to the Labor Day demonstrations and against the National Front. Hundreds of thousands of people who normally did not take part in such demonstrations came, in addition to the usual unions. In Paris, 500,000 people were seen in the streets, one of the greatest protest since the Liberation of Paris; the march was so big it had to be divided in three parts to reach the place de la Bastille. In another unusual sight for 1 May demonstrations, French tricolour flags were commonplace.

A 2025 study found that the protests against Le Pen "reduced the number of votes for Le Pen and abstention, while increasing the number of votes for the incumbent president, Jacques Chirac." The protests also "reduced support for the policies advocated by Le Pen. Moreover, the positive effect on voting for Chirac resulted from right-wing voters switching from Le Pen to Chirac and left-wing voters not casting a blank ballot, implying that some voters voted expressively. Finally, we show that protests reduced the social desirability of voting for Le Pen."

Chirac refused to debate with Le Pen, and the traditional televised debate was cancelled.

The choice between Chirac, who was under suspicion for actions carried out whilst he was mayor of Paris but benefited from presidential immunity as long as he stayed president, and Le Pen, a nationalist often accused of racism and antisemitism, was one that many found tough. Some people suggested going to vote with a clothes peg on their noses to express disgust when voting for Chirac, but this may have been illegal, because it is prohibited to advertise one's vote inside the voting precinct. In the days before the second ballot, a memorable poster was put up of Chirac with the slogan "Vote for the Crook, not the Fascist". Chirac defeated Le Pen by a landslide.

Candidate	Party	First round		Second round	
Candidate	Party	Votes	%	Votes	%
Jacques Chirac (incumbent)	Rally for the Republic	5,665,855	19.88	25,537,956	82.21
Jean-Marie Le Pen	National Front	4,804,713	16.86	5,525,032	17.79
Lionel Jospin	Socialist Party	4,610,113	16.18		
François Bayrou	Union for French Democracy	1,949,170	6.84		
Arlette Laguiller	Workers' Struggle	1,630,045	5.72		
Jean-Pierre Chevènement	Citizens' Movement	1,518,528	5.33		
Noël Mamère	The Greens	1,495,724	5.25		
Olivier Besancenot	Revolutionary Communist League	1,210,562	4.25		
Jean Saint-Josse	Hunting, Fishing, Nature and Traditions	1,204,689	4.23		
Alain Madelin	Liberal Democracy	1,113,484	3.91		
Robert Hue	French Communist Party	960,480	3.37		
Bruno Mégret	National Republican Movement	667,026	2.34		
Christiane Taubira	Radical Party of the Left	660,447	2.32		
Corinne Lepage	Cap21	535,837	1.88		
Christine Boutin	Forum of Social Republicans	339,112	1.19		
Daniel Gluckstein	Workers' Party	132,686	0.47		
Total		28,498,471	100.00	31,062,988	100.00
Valid votes		28,498,471	96.62	31,062,988	94.61
Invalid/blank votes		997,262	3.38	1,769,307	5.39
Total votes		29,495,733	100.00	32,832,295	100.00
Registered voters/turnout		41,194,689	71.60	41,191,169	79.71
Source: List of candidates · First round result · Second round result

=== First round ===
==== By department ====
Department	Jacques Chirac	Jean-Marie Le Pen	Lionel Jospin	François Bayrou	Arlette Laguiller	Jean-Pierre Chevènement	Noël Mamère	Olivier Besancenot	Jean Saint-Josse	Alain Madelin	Robert Hue	Bruno Mégret	Christiane Taubira	Corinne Lepage	Christine Boutin	Daniel Gluckstein	Electorate	Votes	Valid votes	Invalid votes
Paris	178,841	69,658	148,624	58,924	22,714	49,342	55,050	25,476	3,905	48,403	16,299	7,616	28,189	18,285	11,119	2,498	1,081,420	759,030	744,943	14,087
Seine-et-Marne	93,472	89,719	70,566	30,955	26,786	30,142	25,654	18,294	10,402	19,105	14,323	14,738	13,895	10,094	4,400	2,414	721,818	488,201	474,959	13,242
Yvelines	125,635	81,906	83,305	49,163	23,116	35,850	32,022	17,194	8,809	30,074	12,861	11,127	14,324	15,050	12,977	1,965	825,397	567,885	555,378	12,507
Essonne	86,563	72,286	76,215	32,319	24,612	33,059	28,029	17,139	7,194	17,702	15,562	9,556	15,555	10,627	4,517	1,986	681,706	464,854	452,921	11,933
Hauts-de-Seine	129,297	64,204	89,958	47,834	20,572	35,165	31,570	16,209	4,290	31,962	18,086	9,040	18,432	13,633	7,996	1,749	814,866	551,789	539,997	11,792
Seine-Saint-Denis	63,920	70,326	70,757	20,734	23,699	25,383	24,325	14,965	3,129	13,988	24,856	9,780	20,790	5,562	2,431	1,831	630,897	406,465	396,476	9,989
Val-de Marne	85,658	63,397	75,838	31,862	20,764	30,332	27,748	15,854	3,889	21,640	23,964	8,634	18,190	8,957	3,412	1,926	676,285	452,910	442,065	10,845
Val-de Oise	74,994	72,177	64,903	27,250	20,860	26,409	22,217	13,876	5,427	17,401	16,063	8,836	14,981	8,016	3,340	1,802	604,309	408,658	398,552	10,106
Ardennes	24,038	30,826	21,767	7,551	9,799	5,637	5,207	5,863	5,283	3,914	4,548	4,848	1,490	1,817	1,246	664	192,422	138,608	134,498	4,110
Aube	28,915	30,009	18,882	8,608	7,731	6,485	5,072	4,990	6,906	5,661	4,417	3,693	2,071	2,490	1,476	734	193,701	142,924	138,140	4,784
Marne	52,510	49,349	35,287	19,663	17,682	12,119	11,973	10,072	8,872	10,848	6,867	7,275	3,778	4,932	2,724	1,180	372,077	262,980	255,131	7,849
Haute-Marne	19,862	22,355	13,057	5,647	6,195	4,467	4,320	4,751	5,094	3,817	2,470	2,921	1,487	1,683	1,046	549	143,635	103,704	99,721	3,983
Aisne	49,280	55,562	40,209	13,972	21,369	12,230	9,379	12,412	10,646	8,462	10,286	6,831	3,228	3,727	2,333	1,877	366,934	270,651	261,803	8,848
Oise	66,362	82,589	49,549	21,596	25,167	18,736	16,142	14,719	11,776	12,920	12,029	11,654	7,028	6,513	4,064	2,004	506,844	373,919	362,848	11,071
Somme	51,488	47,729	40,764	18,730	23,372	12,240	10,704	12,864	35,413	7,570	13,109	6,351	3,609	4,643	2,451	1,598	400,012	302,856	292,635	10,221
Eure	52,432	53,120	37,737	17,574	18,640	12,672	11,909	12,634	14,104	10,126	8,007	7,990	5,217	5,100	2,555	1,523	378,410	280,875	271,340	9,535
Seine-Maritime	113,654	96,671	100,010	35,963	46,966	27,872	29,290	30,415	22,320	19,315	27,170	15,861	11,256	10,297	5,478	3,316	837,659	616,057	595,854	20,203
Cher	33,276	25,449	23,688	9,493	11,121	7,950	6,500	6,887	8,891	5,549	10,377	3,597	2,838	2,608	1,728	906	228,120	167,310	160,858	6,452
Eure-et-Loir	40,167	37,905	28,635	13,511	11,773	9,792	8,588	7,731	10,420	8,510	4,619	5,412	4,030	3,676	2,688	1,076	278,123	205,306	198,533	6,773
Indre	26,714	19,331	20,876	6,631	8,267	5,489	4,613	5,959	9,455	3,985	5,614	2,601	2,041	2,140	1,635	747	176,678	132,708	126,098	6,610
Indre-et-Loire	53,504	39,359	44,624	19,009	17,796	15,263	14,367	12,143	12,738	12,688	7,600	5,503	5,763	5,764	3,836	1,579	381,130	281,686	271,536	10,150
Loir-et-Cher	32,004	30,818	24,494	12,587	10,191	8,131	7,154	7,095	11,085	6,163	5,624	4,038	2,853	3,003	1,772	874	232,656	174,623	167,886	6,737
Loiret	58,575	57,523	41,857	21,184	15,286	15,858	13,876	10,780	14,546	12,342	8,963	8,973	6,017	6,164	3,542	1,330	409,309	306,712	296,816	9,896
Calvados	63,580	46,258	51,516	22,631	24,204	15,556	17,279	15,698	22,468	12,511	7,593	6,497	6,902	7,256	3,822	1,801	458,071	336,490	325,572	10,918
Manche	64,961	34,069	34,993	17,001	17,002	12,233	10,161	12,192	20,300	9,851	4,949	4,567	4,338	4,919	3,090	1,304	358,965	265,401	255,930	9,471
Orne	35,949	28,076	20,344	10,813	9,816	5,685	6,719	6,839	8,617	6,164	3,023	3,229	2,541	3,077	2,190	828	214,215	159,377	153,910	5,467
Côte-d'Or	45,983	43,391	36,933	18,264	14,009	16,664	12,195	10,545	7,999	9,962	5,258	6,294	4,649	5,026	3,013	1,350	330,318	249,448	241,535	7,913
Nièvre	20,421	19,138	23,775	6,205	7,656	6,253	4,627	5,742	5,869	3,649	6,978	2,510	1,821	1,718	1,137	693	170,396	123,135	118,192	4,943
Saône-et-Loire	53,346	49,446	46,968	17,735	16,167	14,362	11,589	13,282	11,573	12,976	9,604	7,482	4,515	4,308	3,490	1,479	398,818	291,043	278,322	12,721
Yonne	33,444	35,071	22,805	10,651	9,287	8,774	7,102	6,945	7,035	6,551	5,254	5,821	2,852	3,010	1,752	955	235,687	173,279	167,309	5,970
Nord	209,977	230,015	199,036	78,071	85,680	54,733	56,414	50,131	41,881	40,684	57,639	30,415	15,119	16,528	12,232	5,631	1,721,267	1,224,201	1,184,186	40,015
Pas-de-Calais	121,943	135,330	128,435	36,146	61,395	39,066	27,992	34,291	47,113	21,247	39,553	16,219	7,837	8,023	6,580	3,974	1,047,845	766,539	735,144	31,395
Meurthe-et-Moselle	59,478	58,515	52,222	20,540	24,407	18,505	17,307	15,604	6,821	11,316	11,979	8,892	6,211	6,035	3,542	1,770	469,462	333,211	323,144	10,067
Meuse	19,302	19,943	13,987	7,126	6,475	4,376	4,458	4,441	4,427	3,479	2,254	2,764	1,509	1,865	1,129	490	138,972	101,751	98,025	3,726
Moselle	89,936	112,092	68,611	30,906	33,421	21,671	24,762	20,379	6,261	15,504	10,061	16,022	7,271	8,047	5,739	2,823	712,299	491,118	473,506	17,612
Vosges	37,939	41,379	28,119	12,555	13,378	10,860	8,941	10,051	6,268	7,798	4,133	5,533	3,194	3,681	2,665	1,070	283,175	207,178	197,564	9,614
Bas-Rhin	89,176	112,555	53,772	57,496	22,459	21,717	28,968	16,416	4,973	22,249	4,320	18,690	8,734	10,196	7,416	2,202	674,812	498,750	481,339	17,411
Haut-Rhin	61,642	80,030	36,722	31,033	17,710	21,452	20,443	12,027	3,430	14,015	3,709	16,971	5,766	7,619	6,080	1,536	478,443	353,004	340,185	12,819
Doubs	46,190	46,988	35,993	15,519	13,667	22,406	12,862	11,238	7,203	9,147	4,305	7,655	4,256	4,747	3,528	1,180	334,718	256,375	246,884	9,491
Jura	22,837	24,134	17,756	9,332	7,605	9,623	7,315	6,952	5,256	5,533	3,873	4,127	2,253	2,586	2,034	838	181,347	137,575	132,054	5,521
Haute-Saône	22,908	28,418	17,091	6,768	7,047	11,055	4,957	5,970	5,963	4,353	2,725	4,354	1,878	1,955	1,286	634	174,508	133,163	127,362	5,801
Territoire de Belfort	9,393	14,837	6,548	3,366	3,667	12,826	2,819	2,644	1,427	1,621	1,179	2,644	909	1,064	777	330	89,644	68,467	66,051	2,416
Loire-Atlantique	109,247	67,214	104,631	46,017	36,753	29,602	41,111	31,914	26,267	24,310	14,466	8,776	13,072	14,597	10,884	3,305	814,585	603,023	582,166	20,857
Maine-et-Loire	80,628	42,583	54,721	36,297	21,853	15,866	22,621	17,258	16,536	16,761	6,975	6,638	7,584	8,337	8,109	1,986	510,019	382,953	364,753	18,200
Mayenne	39,198	18,020	21,860	12,792	8,344	5,965	8,676	8,047	5,758	7,377	2,368	2,427	2,804	3,364	3,939	861	214,016	160,097	151,800	8,297
Sarthe	56,362	39,762	44,115	16,546	19,496	12,428	14,120	13,626	9,688	9,605	8,730	5,463	4,643	5,367	3,362	1,633	385,397	278,476	264,946	13,530
Vendée	77,311	36,437	45,770	25,890	17,559	11,941	15,943	13,664	19,990	14,323	5,663	4,973	5,670	7,044	6,385	1,496	427,889	325,448	310,059	15,389
Côtes-d'Armor	64,332	37,049	61,040	20,172	21,324	13,918	19,495	18,142	12,516	12,379	15,329	3,514	6,341	6,263	3,764	1,534	428,856	327,955	317,112	10,843
Finistère	101,792	50,028	85,911	34,930	29,702	22,132	30,395	27,352	16,411	18,988	13,479	4,427	10,579	9,399	5,467	2,108	635,751	476,554	463,100	13,454
Ille-et-Vilaine	94,703	46,449	79,142	34,958	29,955	20,231	31,346	23,863	15,251	22,559	9,373	5,047	11,137	10,878	7,112	2,253	618,329	460,065	444,257	15,808
Morbihan	81,711	53,797	60,422	23,860	20,519	15,097	20,898	18,577	14,208	16,371	9,791	3,925	7,189	8,162	5,168	1,605	498,938	373,926	361,300	12,626
Charente	35,396	24,735	31,870	10,501	12,415	8,017	8,981	9,650	13,257	5,909	6,810	3,445	3,194	3,167	1,857	972	255,110	187,788	180,176	7,612
Charente Maritime	59,749	39,427	47,399	18,238	17,534	13,372	15,162	13,453	27,130	11,697	9,266	5,531	6,404	5,411	2,679	1,550	417,856	305,202	294,002	11,200
Deux-Sèvres	41,890	17,367	33,998	15,008	12,960	7,639	11,134	10,108	12,516	6,758	3,819	2,416	3,900	3,587	3,135	1,094	260,937	197,203	187,329	9,874
Vienne	44,459	22,968	35,860	13,613	14,804	9,383	11,890	10,668	15,066	6,646	6,523	3,019	4,327	3,935	2,621	1,185	286,933	215,991	206,967	9,024
Dordogne	47,864	27,014	38,526	11,412	12,494	9,862	10,228	11,407	17,245	6,233	13,750	4,573	3,851	3,649	1,895	1,060	303,991	231,846	221,063	10,783
Gironde	113,648	85,813	109,017	40,358	35,582	29,080	37,641	26,856	47,635	18,128	20,193	8,906	11,752	10,660	5,432	2,555	867,452	621,759	603,256	18,503
Landes	35,769	19,516	40,798	13,101	8,938	7,223	7,768	8,064	22,563	4,714	8,351	2,166	2,601	2,416	1,682	666	258,936	193,898	186,336	7,562
Lot-et-Garonne	28,802	31,184	25,955	11,065	7,993	6,708	7,482	7,043	15,281	4,972	6,704	4,347	2,766	2,396	1,646	602	229,022	171,351	164,946	6,405
Pyrénées-Atlantiques	58,976	32,644	55,996	41,432	16,291	12,118	18,087	15,865	29,303	7,700	9,313	3,280	5,566	4,675	2,851	1,154	450,504	327,615	315,251	12,364
Ariège	11,394	12,027	18,890	3,236	4,388	3,703	4,207	4,442	6,684	1,629	4,162	1,256	1,476	1,076	687	349	109,027	82,873	79,606	3,267
Aveyron	35,438	19,344	26,062	11,435	7,903	7,994	7,611	7,780	13,115	6,705	4,702	2,502	3,029	2,999	2,538	641	214,595	167,871	159,798	8,073
Haute-Garonne	79,080	86,395	110,550	33,291	28,887	30,276	35,867	24,285	20,062	16,422	16,024	9,284	12,391	10,582	4,985	2,166	709,805	539,821	520,547	19,274
Gers	17,961	13,331	19,902	6,459	4,946	4,404	4,574	4,566	10,828	2,757	3,471	1,663	2,202	1,569	1,098	368	135,423	104,683	100,099	4,584
Lot	18,283	10,263	16,789	4,771	5,439	5,278	5,175	5,200	9,680	2,749	4,357	1,432	2,833	1,789	981	482	128,177	99,961	95,501	4,460
Hautes-Pyrénées	19,852	14,965	24,355	9,385	6,799	5,365	5,712	6,553	11,012	2,752	6,643	1,680	2,774	2,035	1,227	524	169,135	126,983	121,633	5,350
Tarn	35,064	32,617	36,275	11,712	11,122	9,416	9,595	8,957	12,826	5,693	6,720	4,608	3,431	3,057	2,327	772	261,605	203,705	194,192	9,513
Tarn-et-Garonne	20,325	23,160	18,004	6,685	5,961	5,232	5,251	4,796	9,690	3,373	3,364	3,065	2,751	1,762	1,236	452	153,826	119,619	115,107	4,512
Corrèze	48,170	12,463	23,130	4,613	7,836	5,461	4,572	6,169	8,808	2,813	9,685	1,675	1,918	1,931	936	556	184,267	146,745	140,736	6,009
Creuse	18,378	7,831	12,798	3,143	4,207	3,325	2,406	3,531	4,890	1,832	3,827	1,155	1,025	909	555	330	101,812	73,871	70,142	3,729
Haute-Vienne	41,677	21,393	37,587	8,788	14,233	10,049	8,436	10,431	10,000	5,012	10,764	3,332	3,389	3,127	1,750	1,001	261,252	201,251	190,969	10,282
Ain	41,348	52,617	30,418	18,614	11,562	14,665	12,339	9,404	9,718	12,580	5,134	8,425	4,527	5,258	2,966	1,077	338,220	249,217	240,652	8,565
Ardèche	27,861	27,043	22,946	10,984	8,613	9,072	8,467	8,287	12,391	5,289	6,717	4,244	3,086	3,039	2,536	870	219,897	167,677	161,445	6,232
Drôme	35,553	46,484	31,172	15,518	10,947	13,353	12,859	10,005	11,289	8,399	6,963	6,577	4,787	4,499	4,149	955	309,557	231,154	223,509	7,645
Isère	77,215	92,576	80,852	34,650	29,345	34,192	35,248	22,930	13,660	22,132	17,988	13,649	10,856	11,855	6,339	2,563	708,265	522,650	506,050	16,600
Loire	57,378	73,638	45,519	27,300	19,208	20,567	17,096	14,887	10,882	13,951	11,404	9,808	5,449	6,154	4,823	1,681	483,976	352,329	339,745	12,584
Rhône	121,703	130,367	94,101	59,622	30,042	44,823	40,908	24,135	11,073	38,039	17,013	17,005	15,923	16,208	10,025	2,633	932,406	691,830	673,620	18,210
Savoie	33,958	37,312	24,688	13,352	9,213	11,936	11,923	8,326	5,604	9,186	5,886	5,197	3,831	4,738	2,339	1,090	265,061	195,013	188,579	6,434
Haute-Savoie	55,175	61,547	33,776	24,573	13,380	16,785	21,431	11,268	6,705	18,182	5,105	6,929	6,325	9,400	4,250	1,221	421,449	306,394	296,052	10,342
Allier	37,533	25,387	28,814	11,576	11,241	9,337	6,961	8,467	7,936	6,018	14,616	3,268	2,669	2,597	2,375	973	256,113	189,047	179,768	9,279
Cantal	27,351	9,848	12,737	4,885	4,456	3,918	2,935	3,839	8,257	2,453	2,455	1,542	1,227	1,423	812	457	123,827	92,562	88,595	3,967
Haute-Loire	24,631	22,171	15,435	10,287	6,982	6,514	5,529	6,259	5,876	4,167	2,903	3,131	1,995	1,972	1,952	675	166,347	126,480	120,479	6,001
Puy-de-Dôme	57,551	41,307	51,571	21,691	23,363	19,203	15,345	17,695	11,490	10,482	11,123	6,027	5,991	5,576	3,326	1,742	425,502	317,550	303,483	14,067
Aude	26,021	34,357	37,021	7,521	9,344	8,707	6,999	7,700	12,050	4,151	8,365	4,316	2,619	2,113	1,405	745	236,852	179,992	173,434	6,558
Gard	48,342	79,743	44,406	19,577	16,332	16,563	13,901	12,556	17,158	10,718	16,868	9,969	5,471	4,753	3,046	1,452	445,560	331,084	320,855	10,229
Hérault	68,502	104,841	73,208	25,452	22,552	24,362	25,245	18,369	26,303	15,696	18,669	11,120	9,185	6,950	3,890	1,910	632,459	470,172	456,254	13,918
Lozère	10,838	5,958	5,637	3,277	2,035	2,091	1,944	2,040	3,644	1,875	1,464	749	822	690	633	176	58,864	45,517	43,873	1,644
Pyrénées-Orientales	34,199	42,196	33,498	12,355	10,567	10,406	8,825	8,573	11,735	6,414	9,701	4,854	3,191	2,650	1,467	842	285,980	208,397	201,473	6,924
Alpes-de Haute-Provence	12,998	13,184	10,845	4,651	4,366	4,654	4,468	4,056	7,123	2,943	3,465	2,252	1,700	1,459	845	421	108,943	82,395	79,430	2,965
Haute Alpes	12,036	9,965	9,152	4,816	3,437	4,068	4,677	3,797	5,063	3,579	2,376	1,933	1,664	1,593	926	320	95,100	72,049	69,402	2,647
Alpes-Maritimes	102,588	121,362	56,868	31,729	17,544	22,634	22,388	11,992	11,430	22,671	13,984	11,825	6,939	8,283	3,466	1,337	690,348	478,074	467,040	11,034
Bouches-du-Rhône	138,189	182,778	114,323	47,530	40,220	44,947	41,563	26,860	32,097	31,371	39,032	40,628	14,078	12,823	6,472	2,979	1,144,969	838,148	815,890	22,258
Var	96,365	106,710	54,781	27,628	20,363	23,995	19,748	13,621	21,948	18,901	13,844	14,330	6,858	7,807	4,624	1,651	645,315	464,740	453,174	11,566
Vaucluse	41,935	64,831	31,611	14,270	11,274	12,190	11,891	9,313	15,129	9,025	7,729	9,924	4,481	4,350	2,319	1,061	342,881	259,077	251,333	7,744
Corse-du-Sud	13,899	8,749	7,539	1,831	1,666	3,400	1,630	1,408	3,885	1,198	2,360	721	1,161	421	225	168	86,526	51,450	50,261	1,189
Haute-Corse	16,281	8,417	9,297	1,829	1,963	4,300	1,635	1,592	5,123	1,005	3,141	958	2,801	499	244	116	104,774	60,687	59,201	1,486
Guadeloupe	26,416	2,695	21,012	807	813	1,289	972	507	342	692	592	300	33,794	328	530	78	278,104	95,333	91,167	4,166
Martinique	29,424	1,563	26,059	769	1,055	2,022	882	421	221	484	429	177	24,864	232	742	84	266,229	94,251	89,428	4,823
French Guiana	4,496	1,180	2,506	401	310	586	455	290	143	241	88	150	12,479	143	159	37	51,787	24,216	23,664	552
Réunion	86,830	8,915	91,176	5,838	5,966	7,305	5,001	4,512	1,149	2,460	2,755	2,027	4,914	2,232	2,129	512	436,745	246,054	233,721	12,333
Sainte Pierre and Miquelon	599	260	265	80	121	82	167	93	31	19	20	27	119	29	28	5	4,813	2,020	1,942	78
Mayotte	9,105	536	3,972	2,595	249	791	306	490	122	1,112	127	277	1,120	158	133	96	52,218	21,525	21,189	336
Wallis and Futuna	3,031	46	2,144	47	70	449	35	47	18	9	9	13	28	16	17	11	9,353	6,027	5,990	37
French Polynesia	47,133	3,179	18,670	704	686	786	1,118	804	287	378	150	422	389	422	309	122	151,505	78,890	75,559	3,331
New Caledonia	29,490	6,610	13,667	1,414	1,184	1,116	1,847	1,352	453	760	210	540	791	923	482	112	126,985	62,551	60,951	1,600
Source: European Election Database

==== By region ====
Region	Jacques Chirac	Jean-Marie Le Pen	Lionel Jospin	François Bayrou	Arlette Laguiller	Jean-Pierre Chevènement	Noël Mamère	Olivier Besancenot	Jean Saint-Josse	Alain Madelin	Robert Hue	Bruno Mégret	Christiane Taubira	Corinne Lepage	Christine Boutin	Daniel Gluckstein	Electorate	Votes	Valid votes	Invalid votes
Île-de-France	838,380	583,673	680,166	299,041	183,123	265,682	246,615	139,007	47,045	200,275	142,014	79,327	144,356	90,224	50,192	16,171	6,036,698	4,099,792	4,005,291	94,501
Champagne-Ardenne	125,325	132,539	88,993	41,469	41,407	28,708	26,572	25,676	26,155	24,240	18,302	18,737	8,826	10,922	6,492	3,127	901,835	648,216	627,490	20,726
Picardy	167,130	185,880	130,522	54,298	69,908	43,206	36,225	39,995	57,835	28,952	35,424	24,836	13,865	14,883	8,848	5,479	1,273,790	947,426	917,286	30,140
Upper Normandy	166,086	149,791	137,747	53,537	65,606	40,544	41,199	43,049	36,424	29,441	35,177	23,851	16,473	15,397	8,033	4,839	1,216,069	896,932	867,194	29,738
Centre	244,240	210,385	184,174	82,415	74,434	62,483	55,098	50,595	67,135	49,237	42,797	30,124	23,542	23,355	15,201	6,512	1,706,016	1,268,345	1,221,727	46,618
Lower Normandy	164,490	108,403	106,853	50,445	51,022	33,474	34,159	34,729	51,385	28,526	15,565	14,293	13,781	15,252	9,102	3,933	1,031,251	761,268	735,412	25,856
Burgundy	153,194	147,046	130,481	52,855	47,119	46,053	35,513	36,514	32,476	33,138	27,094	22,107	13,837	14,062	9,392	4,477	1,135,219	836,905	805,358	31,547
Nord-Pas-de-Calais	331,920	365,345	327,471	114,217	147,075	93,799	84,406	84,422	88,994	61,931	97,192	46,634	22,956	24,551	18,812	9,605	2,769,112	1,990,740	1,919,330	71,410
Lorraine	206,655	231,929	162,939	71,127	77,681	55,412	55,468	50,475	23,777	38,097	28,427	33,211	18,185	19,628	13,075	6,153	1,603,908	1,133,258	1,092,239	41,019
Alsace	150,818	192,585	90,494	88,529	40,169	43,169	49,411	28,443	8,403	36,264	8,029	35,661	14,500	17,815	13,496	3,738	1,153,255	851,754	821,524	30,230
Franche-Comté	101,328	114,377	77,388	34,985	31,986	55,910	27,953	26,804	19,849	20,654	12,082	18,780	9,296	10,352	7,625	2,982	780,217	595,580	572,351	23,229
Pays de la Loire	362,746	204,016	271,097	137,542	104,005	75,802	102,471	84,509	78,239	72,376	38,202	28,277	33,773	38,709	32,679	9,281	2,351,906	1,749,997	1,673,724	76,273
Brittany	342,538	187,323	286,515	113,920	101,500	71,378	102,134	87,934	58,386	70,297	47,972	16,913	35,246	34,702	21,511	7,500	2,181,874	1,638,500	1,585,769	52,731
Poitou-Charentes	181,494	104,497	149,127	57,360	57,713	38,411	47,167	43,879	67,969	31,010	26,418	14,411	17,825	16,100	10,292	4,801	1,220,836	906,184	868,474	37,710
Aquitaine	285,059	196,171	270,292	117,368	81,298	64,991	81,206	69,235	132,027	41,747	58,311	23,272	26,536	23,796	13,506	6,037	2,109,905	1,546,469	1,490,852	55,617
Midi-Pyrénées	237,397	212,102	270,827	86,974	75,445	71,668	77,992	66,579	93,897	42,080	49,443	25,490	30,887	24,869	15,079	5,754	1,881,593	1,445,516	1,386,483	59,033
Limousin	108,225	41,687	73,515	16,544	26,276	18,835	15,414	20,131	23,698	9,657	24,276	6,162	6,332	5,967	3,241	1,887	547,331	421,867	401,847	20,020
Rhône-Alpes	450,191	521,584	363,472	204,613	132,310	165,393	160,271	109,242	81,322	127,758	76,210	71,834	54,784	61,151	37,427	12,090	3,678,831	2,716,264	2,629,652	86,612
Auvergne	147,066	98,713	108,557	48,439	46,042	38,972	30,770	36,260	33,559	23,120	31,097	13,968	11,882	11,568	8,465	3,847	971,789	725,639	692,325	33,314
Languedoc-Roussillon	187,902	267,095	193,770	68,182	60,830	62,129	56,914	49,238	70,890	38,854	55,067	31,008	21,288	17,156	10,441	5,125	1,659,715	1,235,162	1,195,889	39,273
Provence-Alpes-Côte d'Azur	404,111	498,830	277,580	130,624	97,204	112,488	104,735	69,639	92,790	88,490	80,430	80,892	35,720	36,315	18,652	7,769	3,027,556	2,194,483	2,136,269	58,214
Corsica	30,180	17,166	16,836	3,660	3,629	7,700	3,265	3,000	9,008	2,203	5,501	1,679	3,962	920	469	284	191,300	112,137	109,462	2,675
Guadeloupe	26,416	2,695	21,012	807	813	1,289	972	507	342	692	592	300	33,794	328	530	78	278,104	95,333	91,167	4,166
Martinique	29,424	1,563	26,059	769	1,055	2,022	882	421	221	484	429	177	24,864	232	742	84	266,229	94,251	89,428	4,823
French Guiana	4,496	1,180	2,506	401	310	586	455	290	143	241	88	150	12,479	143	159	37	51,787	24,216	23,664	552
Réunion	86,830	8,915	91,176	5,838	5,966	7,305	5,001	4,512	1,149	2,460	2,755	2,027	4,914	2,232	2,129	512	436,745	246,054	233,721	12,333
Saint Pierre and Miquelon	599	260	265	80	121	82	167	93	31	19	20	27	119	29	28	5	4,813	2,020	1,942	78
Mayotte	9,105	536	3,972	2,595	249	791	306	490	122	1,112	127	277	1,120	158	133	96	52,218	21,525	21,189	336
Wallis and Futuna	3,031	46	2,144	47	70	449	35	47	18	9	9	13	28	16	17	11	9,353	6,027	5,990	37
French Polynesia	47,133	3,179	18,670	704	686	786	1,118	804	287	378	150	422	389	422	309	122	151,505	78,890	75,559	3,331
New Caledonia	29,490	6,610	13,667	1,414	1,184	1,116	1,847	1,352	453	760	210	540	791	923	482	112	126,985	62,551	60,951	1,600
Source: European Election Database

=== Second round ===
==== By department ====
Department	Jacques Chirac	Jean-Marie Le Pen	Electorate	Votes	Valid votes	Invalid votes
Paris	784,741	87,501	1,081,313	896,811	872,242	24,569
Seine-et-Marne	444,755	106,789	721,846	578,840	551,544	27,296
Yvelines	556,799	93,754	825,366	676,487	650,553	25,934
Essonne	448,940	79,451	681,806	552,297	528,391	23,906
Hauts-de-Seine	561,114	76,605	815,107	658,904	637,719	21,185
Seine-Saint-Denis	382,424	80,765	631,147	483,067	463,189	19,878
Val-de Marne	448,375	71,632	677,795	540,155	520,007	20,148
Val-de Oise	382,976	79,956	604,201	483,293	462,932	20,361
Ardennes	106,793	33,865	192,407	150,939	140,658	10,281
Aube	112,465	33,831	193,743	155,606	146,296	9,310
Marne	218,627	55,224	372,035	288,939	273,851	15,088
Haute-Marne	80,660	25,232	143,608	113,518	105,892	7,626
Aisne	207,908	67,727	366,995	295,064	275,635	19,429
Oise	287,003	96,100	506,772	406,658	383,103	23,555
Somme	237,353	65,949	399,858	325,298	303,302	21,996
Eure	226,076	62,939	378,241	305,393	289,015	16,378
Seine-Maritime	526,650	111,109	837,500	673,046	637,759	35,287
Cher	142,411	29,026	228,040	182,781	171,437	11,344
Eure-et-Loir	168,207	44,007	277,980	224,267	212,214	12,053
Indre	113,006	22,542	176,656	145,249	135,548	9,701
Indre-et-Loire	249,482	44,549	381,114	309,808	294,031	15,777
Loir-et-Cher	144,756	34,421	232,618	190,078	179,177	10,901
Loiret	257,597	59,448	409,234	334,192	317,045	17,147
Calvados	295,883	56,564	458,107	371,135	352,447	18,688
Manche	237,084	40,832	358,870	292,125	277,916	14,209
Orne	135,900	31,258	214,186	175,871	167,158	8,713
Côte-d'Or	207,875	46,619	330,297	271,035	254,494	16,541
Nièvre	102,079	22,766	170,336	134,578	124,845	9,733
Saône-et-Loire	241,719	53,422	398,409	316,514	295,141	21,373
Yonne	138,765	40,713	235,620	190,306	179,478	10,828
Nord	989,046	274,390	1,721,146	1,337,068	1,263,436	73,632
Pas-de-Calais	600,597	171,231	1,048,035	827,015	771,828	55,187
Meurthe-et-Moselle	287,148	64,244	469,408	371,683	351,392	20,291
Meuse	81,888	22,802	138,855	111,720	104,690	7,030
Moselle	408,846	114,536	712,204	553,009	523,382	29,627
Vosges	168,537	45,326	283,162	228,719	213,863	14,856
Bas-Rhin	406,057	105,886	675,014	539,336	511,943	27,393
Haut-Rhin	280,694	80,774	478,476	382,671	361,468	21,203
Doubs	212,719	47,303	334,645	277,382	260,022	17,360
Jura	112,893	26,227	181,320	149,442	139,120	10,322
Haute-Saône	99,153	31,698	174,459	142,796	130,851	11,945
Territoire de Belfort	52,822	14,972	89,631	73,128	67,794	5,334
Loire-Atlantique	561,582	70,653	814,580	663,938	632,235	31,703
Maine-et-Loire	353,118	48,488	509,928	421,902	401,606	20,296
Mayenne	148,973	19,190	214,054	176,747	168,163	8,584
Sarthe	246,356	45,429	385,345	310,468	291,785	18,683
Vendée	297,854	41,341	427,854	356,532	339,195	17,337
Côtes-d'Armor	300,021	39,753	428,720	360,703	339,774	20,929
Finistère	446,636	52,745	635,432	525,180	499,381	25,799
Ille-et-Vilaine	439,600	49,849	618,248	512,956	489,449	23,507
Morbihan	337,126	54,364	498,955	412,413	391,490	20,923
Charente	165,014	28,700	255,097	207,202	193,714	13,488
Charente Maritime	268,309	52,164	417,799	339,450	320,473	18,977
Deux-Sèvres	186,379	21,597	260,914	218,280	207,976	10,304
Vienne	198,063	27,920	286,962	238,101	225,983	12,118
Dordogne	204,993	34,215	303,830	257,403	239,208	18,195
Gironde	561,009	108,670	867,695	711,267	669,679	41,588
Landes	174,987	25,920	258,814	215,575	200,907	14,668
Lot-et-Garonne	138,294	39,101	228,985	190,920	177,395	13,525
Pyrénées-Atlantiques	304,379	43,503	450,458	371,787	347,882	23,905
Ariège	69,400	13,343	108,986	90,159	82,743	7,416
Aveyron	150,283	20,214	214,793	182,012	170,497	11,515
Haute-Garonne	463,850	87,682	710,535	586,043	551,532	34,511
Gers	91,057	15,821	135,345	114,853	106,878	7,975
Lot	89,690	12,335	128,161	109,627	102,025	7,602
Hautes-Pyrénées	112,494	17,486	169,127	139,934	129,980	9,954
Tarn	169,484	36,172	261,513	221,497	205,656	15,841
Tarn-et-Garonne	94,589	26,046	153,674	129,608	120,635	8,973
Corrèze	134,988	13,530	184,162	158,452	148,518	9,934
Creuse	68,313	9,014	101,802	82,452	77,327	5,125
Haute-Vienne	182,431	22,694	260,919	218,887	205,125	13,762
Ain	204,029	54,957	338,181	273,817	258,986	14,831
Ardèche	140,208	30,531	219,803	182,389	170,739	11,650
Drôme	190,047	49,649	309,535	254,068	239,696	14,372
Isère	449,082	100,462	708,500	577,528	549,544	27,984
Loire	289,590	75,022	484,174	385,483	364,612	20,871
Rhône	587,749	135,496	932,615	755,174	723,245	31,929
Savoie	163,584	37,736	264,930	213,098	201,320	11,778
Haute-Savoie	262,567	58,417	421,165	337,399	320,984	16,415
Allier	164,603	28,569	256,086	207,091	193,172	13,919
Cantal	86,078	11,168	123,815	102,619	97,246	5,373
Haute-Loire	105,112	23,368	166,312	137,517	128,480	9,037
Puy-de-Dôme	286,928	42,700	425,361	351,015	329,628	21,387
Aude	139,875	39,606	236,812	194,714	179,481	15,233
Gard	248,906	90,488	445,500	363,760	339,394	24,366
Hérault	363,019	117,631	632,253	515,174	480,650	34,524
Lozère	39,715	6,693	58,810	49,491	46,408	3,083
Pyrénées-Orientales	160,553	53,876	285,938	230,530	214,429	16,101
Alpes-de Haute-Provence	66,456	17,847	108,907	90,107	84,303	5,804
Haute Alpes	60,756	12,952	95,075	78,543	73,708	4,835
Alpes-Maritimes	357,143	143,648	690,131	524,984	500,791	24,193
Bouches-du-Rhône	638,688	241,814	1,145,020	926,102	880,502	45,600
Var	346,240	139,319	645,326	512,680	485,559	27,121
Vaucluse	186,545	78,601	342,547	281,353	265,146	16,207
Corse-du-Sud	43,557	12,502	86,431	59,743	56,059	3,684
Haute-Corse	53,153	12,009	104,742	69,902	65,162	4,740
Guadeloupe	93,038	8,889	281,514	109,435	101,927	7,508
Martinique	108,562	4,353	266,530	120,372	112,915	7,457
French Guiana	19,726	2,416	51,782	23,339	22,142	1,197
Réunion	278,563	24,542	436,706	317,186	303,105	14,081
Sainte Pierre and Miquelon	2,880	319	4,813	3,324	3,199	125
Mayotte	17,844	2,371	52,189	21,386	20,215	1,171
Wallis and Futuna	5,777	492	9,348	6,350	6,269	81
French Polynesia	70,386	9,824	149,782	83,095	80,210	2,885
New Caledonia	49,816	12,125	126,969	64,204	61,941	2,263
Source: European Election Database

==== By region ====
Region	Jacques Chirac	Jean-Marie Le Pen	Electorate	Votes	Valid votes	Invalid votes
Île de France	4,010,124	676,453	6,038,581	4,869,854	4,686,577	183,277
Champagne-Ardenne	518,545	148,152	901,793	709,002	666,697	42,305
Picardy	732,264	229,776	1,273,625	1,027,020	962,040	64,980
Upper Normandy	752,726	174,048	1,215,741	978,439	926,774	51,665
Centre	1,075,459	233,993	1,705,642	1,386,375	1,309,452	76,923
Lower Normandy	668,867	128,654	1,031,163	839,131	797,521	41,610
Bourgogne	690,438	163,520	1,134,662	912,433	853,958	58,475
Nord-Pas-de-Calais	1,589,643	445,621	2,769,181	2,164,083	2,035,264	128,819
Lorraine	946,419	246,908	1,603,629	1,265,131	1,193,327	71,804
Alsace	686,751	186,660	1,153,490	922,007	873,411	48,596
Franche-Comté	477,587	120,200	780,055	642,748	597,787	44,961
Pays de la Loire	1,607,883	225,101	2,351,761	1,929,587	1,832,984	96,603
Brittany	1,523,383	196,711	2,181,355	1,811,252	1,720,094	91,158
Poitou-Charentes	817,765	130,381	1,220,772	1,003,033	948,146	54,887
Aquitaine	1,383,662	251,409	2,109,782	1,746,952	1,635,071	111,881
Midi-Pyrénées	1,240,847	229,099	1,882,134	1,573,733	1,469,946	103,787
Limousin	385,732	45,238	546,883	459,791	430,970	28,821
Rhône-Alpes	2,286,856	542,270	3,678,903	2,978,956	2,829,126	149,830
Auvergne	642,721	105,805	971,574	798,242	748,526	49,716
Languedoc-Roussillon	952,068	308,294	1,659,313	1,353,669	1,260,362	93,307
Provence-Alpes-Côte d'Azur	1,655,828	634,181	3,027,006	2,413,769	2,290,009	123,760
Corsica	96,710	24,511	191,173	129,645	121,221	8,424
Guadeloupe	93,038	8,889	281,514	109,435	101,927	7,508
Martinique	108,562	4,353	266,530	120,372	112,915	7,457
French Guiana	19,726	2,416	51,782	23,339	22,142	1,197
Réunion	278,563	24,542	436,706	317,186	303,105	14,081
Saint Pierre and Miquelon	2,880	319	4,813	3,324	3,199	125
Mayotte	17,844	2,371	52,189	21,386	20,215	1,171
Wallis and Futuna	5,777	492	9,348	6,350	6,269	81
French Polynesia	70,386	9,824	149,782	83,095	80,210	2,885
New Caledonia	49,816	12,125	126,969	64,204	61,941	2,263

== See also ==
- Comme un coup de tonnerre
- President of France
- Politics of France
- French presidential elections under the Fifth Republic
- 2017 French presidential election
- 2022 French presidential election
- 1991 Louisiana gubernatorial election, where opponents of former Klansmen and white nationalist David Duke used the slogan "Vote for the Crook: It's Important"
- 2026 Portuguese presidential election, another similar election where opponents of right-wing populist André Ventura united behind his socialist adversary
