= Canton of Romans-sur-Isère =

Coordinates: 45.05°N 5.06°E

The canton of Romans-sur-Isère is an administrative division of the Drôme department, southeastern France. It was created at the French canton reorganisation which came into effect in March 2015. Its seat is in Romans-sur-Isère.

It consists of the following communes:

1. Châtillon-Saint-Jean
2. Clérieux
3. Génissieux
4. Mours-Saint-Eusèbe
5. Peyrins
6. Romans-sur-Isère (partly)
7. Saint-Bardoux
8. Saint-Paul-lès-Romans
9. Triors
