= Triors =

- Commune
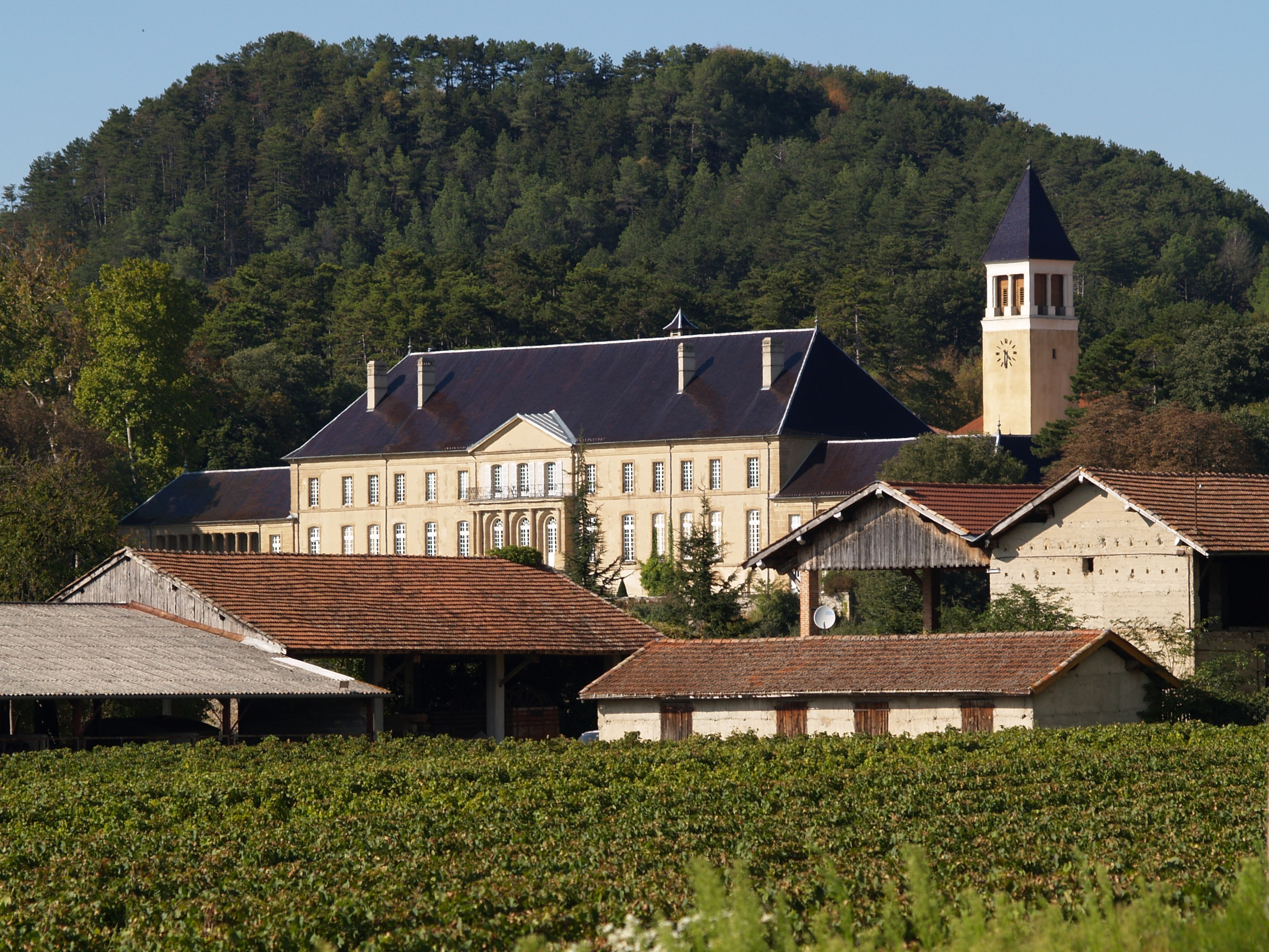
- The abbey of Notre-Dame, in Triors
- Location of Triors
- Location within France Location within Auvergne-Rhône-Alpes
- Coordinates: 45°05′49″N 5°06′58″E
- Country: France
- Region: Auvergne-Rhône-Alpes
- Department: Drôme
- Arrondissement: Valence
- Canton: Romans-sur-Isère
- Intercommunality: CA Valence Romans Agglo

Government
  - Mayor (2023–2026): Pascal Hansberque
- Area^{1}: 5.65 km^{2} (2.18 sq mi)
- Elevation: 200 m (660 ft)
- Highest elevation: 323 m (1,060 ft)
- Lowest elevation: 191 m (627 ft)
- Population (2023): 633
  - Density: 112/km^{2} (290/sq mi)
- Time zone: UTC+01:00 (CET)
  - Summer (DST): UTC+02:00 (CEST)
- INSEE/Postal code: 26355 /26750
- ^{1} French Land Register data, which excludes lakes, ponds, glaciers > 1 km^{2} (0.386 sq mi or 247 acres) and river estuaries.

Triors is a commune in the Drôme department in southeastern France.

== Population ==
Historical population
Year	Pop.	±% p.a.
1968	202	—
1975	189	−0.95%
1982	286	+6.10%
1990	383	+3.72%
1999	482	+2.59%
2007	521	+0.98%
2012	594	+2.66%
2017	567	−0.93%
2023	633	+1.85%
Source: INSEE

== See also ==
- Communes of the Drôme department
