= Lutte Ouvrière =

Workers' Struggle Lutte ouvrière
- Leader: Collective leadership: (Central Committee); Spokesperson: Nathalie Arthaud
- Founded: 1939; 87 years ago (groupe Barta); 1956; 70 years ago (LO)
- Split from: Workers and Peasants' Socialist Party
- Headquarters: Paris
- Membership (2018): 8,000 claimed adherents
- Ideology: Communism; Trotskyism
- Political position: Far-left
- International affiliation: Internationalist Communist Union
- Colours: Red
- Seats in the National Assembly: 0 / 577
- Seats in the Senate: 0 / 343
- Seats in the European Parliament: 0 / 72

Website
- www.lutte-ouvriere.org

Lutte ouvrière (French pronunciation: [lyt uvʁijɛʁ], lit. 'Workers' Struggle'; LO) is a Trotskyist political party in France, named after its weekly paper. Arlette Laguiller was the party's spokeswoman from 1973 to 2008 and ran in each presidential election during this period. Nathalie Arthaud, her successor, has run for president each time since 2012. Robert Barcia (Hardy) was its founder and central leader. Lutte Ouvrière is a member of the Internationalist Communist Union, an organisation mainly composed of parties upholding the Trotskyist interpretation of communism. It emphasises workplace activity and has been critical of such recent phenomena as alter-globalization. The party is against reformism, instead opting for a revolutionary socialist approach, whilst criticizing past communist states.

== History ==
=== Origins ===
Its origins lie in the tiny Barta group, a Trotskyist organisation founded in 1939 by David Korner (Barta), also known as Union Communiste (Communist Union). The group carried out activist efforts in factories throughout World War II and was instrumental in the Renault strike of 1947, along with the anarcho-syndicalists. The group was exhausted by this effort and collapsed in 1950.

After attempts to revive the Barta group, Voix Ouvrière was founded in 1956 by Robert Barcia, known as Hardy and the group's pre-eminent leader, and by Pierre Bois, a leading activist in the Renault plant. Effort was made to involve Barta but disputes between him, Hardy and Bois prevented it.

VO established itself through the 1960s by producing mass factory bulletins, usually weekly. The Communist Party of France (PCF) retained its hegemonic position within the workers' movement in France and its members sometimes tried to prevent the distribution of VO bulletins. In part this explains the continued use of semi-clandestine operation within VO and in LO today.

After being banned due to its support of the Students Revolt of May '68, the group became Lutte Ouvrière.

=== Since the 1970s ===
An ongoing issue was the possibility and conditions of cooperation with fellow Trotskyist party the Revolutionary Communist League (LCR), the French section of the Fourth International. In 1970, LO initiated fusion discussions with the LC (as the LCR was then called). After extensive discussions, the two organisations had agreed the basis for a fused organisation. However, the fusion was not completed. In 1976 discussions between the Ligue and Lutte Ouvrière progressed again. The two organisations started to produce a common weekly supplement to their newspapers, common electoral work and other common campaigning. Since then on occasions the two organizations have stood joint candidates at some elections.

LO has made great efforts to stand in elections either on its own or in an alliance with the LCR. As a result, Arlette Laguiller has become well known to the public as LO's perennial presidential candidate. The early 1970s also saw two breakaways from Lutte Ouvrière. The first such split, in 1974 in Bordeaux, took the name l'Union Ouvrière, but rapidly disintegrated, so much so that when another small split group that developed a year later expected to be able to fuse with l'Union Ouvrière, it found it had already disappeared and were forced to form their own organisation as a consequence. This new group, Combat Communiste, evolved into Socialisme International, an affiliate of the International Socialist Tendency.

Another more recent breakaway developed after Arlette Laguiller's relatively high electoral results in the 1990s and LO's statement that this meant that a new workers' party was a possibility. This statement, as well as a dispute over the personal code members were expected to abide by, led to the departure of over a hundred members to form the Voix des Travailleurs group. This later fused with another smaller group but has more recently joined the Revolutionary Communist League as a recognised faction. In the period up to 2008, a minority faction existed within LO and appeared publicly, although its supporters were segregated in their own cells.

Following the very low score of Arlette Laguiller in the first round of the April–May 2007 presidential election (1,33%, compared to 5,72% in 2002), the party was left with a debt of €1.4 million. According to Michel Rodinson, a party official, the campaign cost was in total €2 million (800,000 of which are paid by the state). The rent of the Zenith for meetings in Paris, as well as the December political poster campaign, account for most of the expenses.

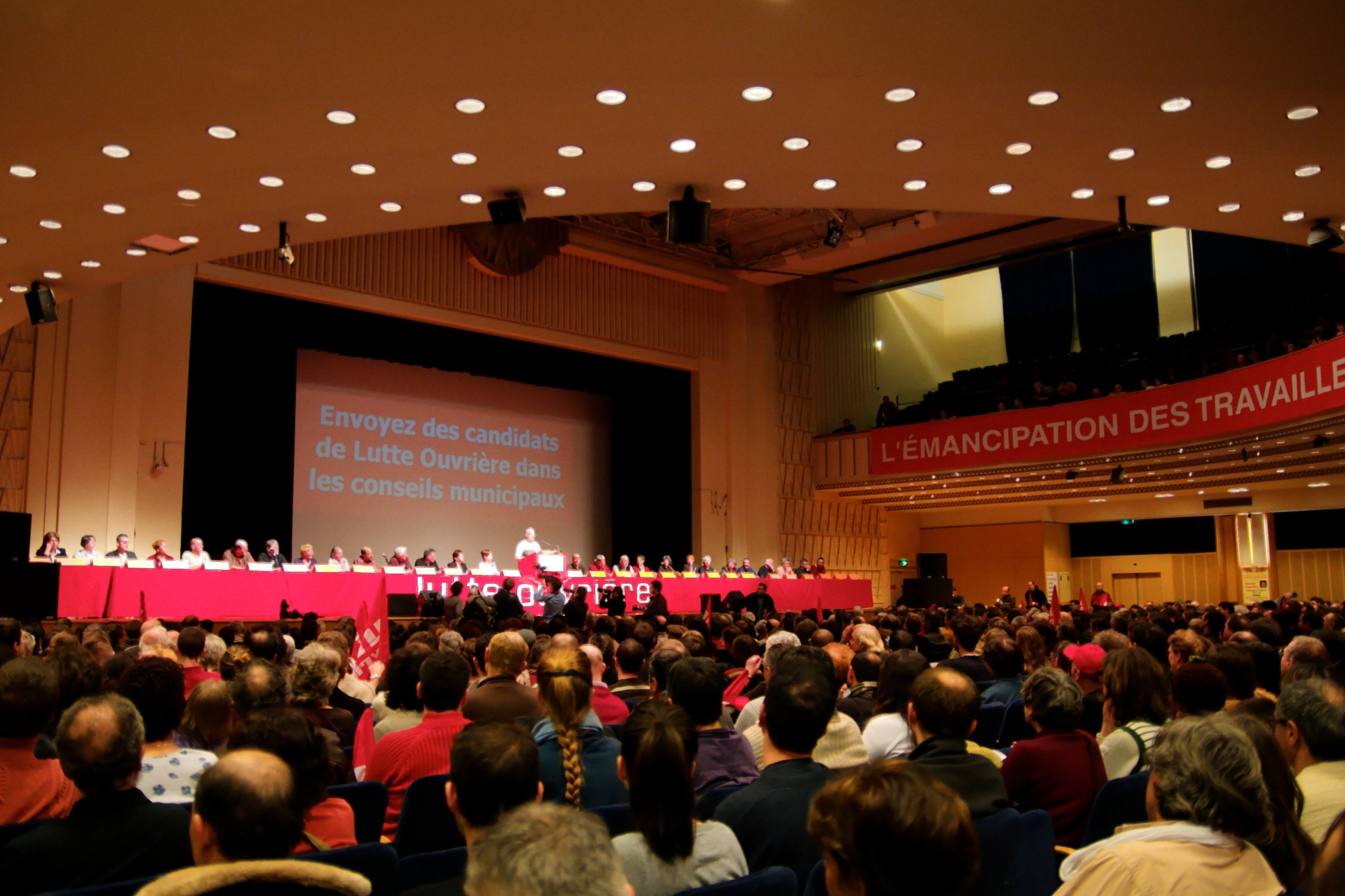
Rally organized by Workers' Struggle (Lutte Ouvrière) on 29 February 2008 at the Maison de la Mutualité (Paris) for the 2008 town elections.

In the local elections in 2008, Lutte Ouvrière broke with tradition by joining the Socialist Party-led slates by the first round of the elections in a number of towns, preferring this tactic to the more usual option of cooperating with other far left groups to run a joint election campaign. Because an organized minority faction called "L'Étincelle" supported some lists running against lists supported by the party leadership, Lutte Ouvrière suspended the faction from the organization in February 2008; the faction was expelled in September 2008. The faction has agreed to take part in the initial stages of the New Anticapitalist Party set up by the LCR with others, though this may not be a long-term strategy, with one member explaining it as "foot in both camps" strategy.

Unlike in 2004 and 1999, when it ran common lists with the Revolutionary Communist League, LO ran autonomous lists in the 2009 European Parliament election in France. For the 2022 French legislative election, LO announced that the party would run its own slate separate from the New Ecologic and Social People's Union, which they believe to be reformist.

In 2026 the party fielded candidates in more than 240 communes for the municipal elections. The party gained 24 seats in 18 communes, with the best result in Clermont, where the party won 3 seats (524 votes, 21,48%).

== Fête de Lutte Ouvrière ==
Another very public activity of LO is their annual fête which is held in the grounds of a chateau which the organisation purchased for that purpose in 1981. The annual Fête de Lutte Ouvrière has been called "the largest Troskyist rally" by France 3.

== Leadership ==
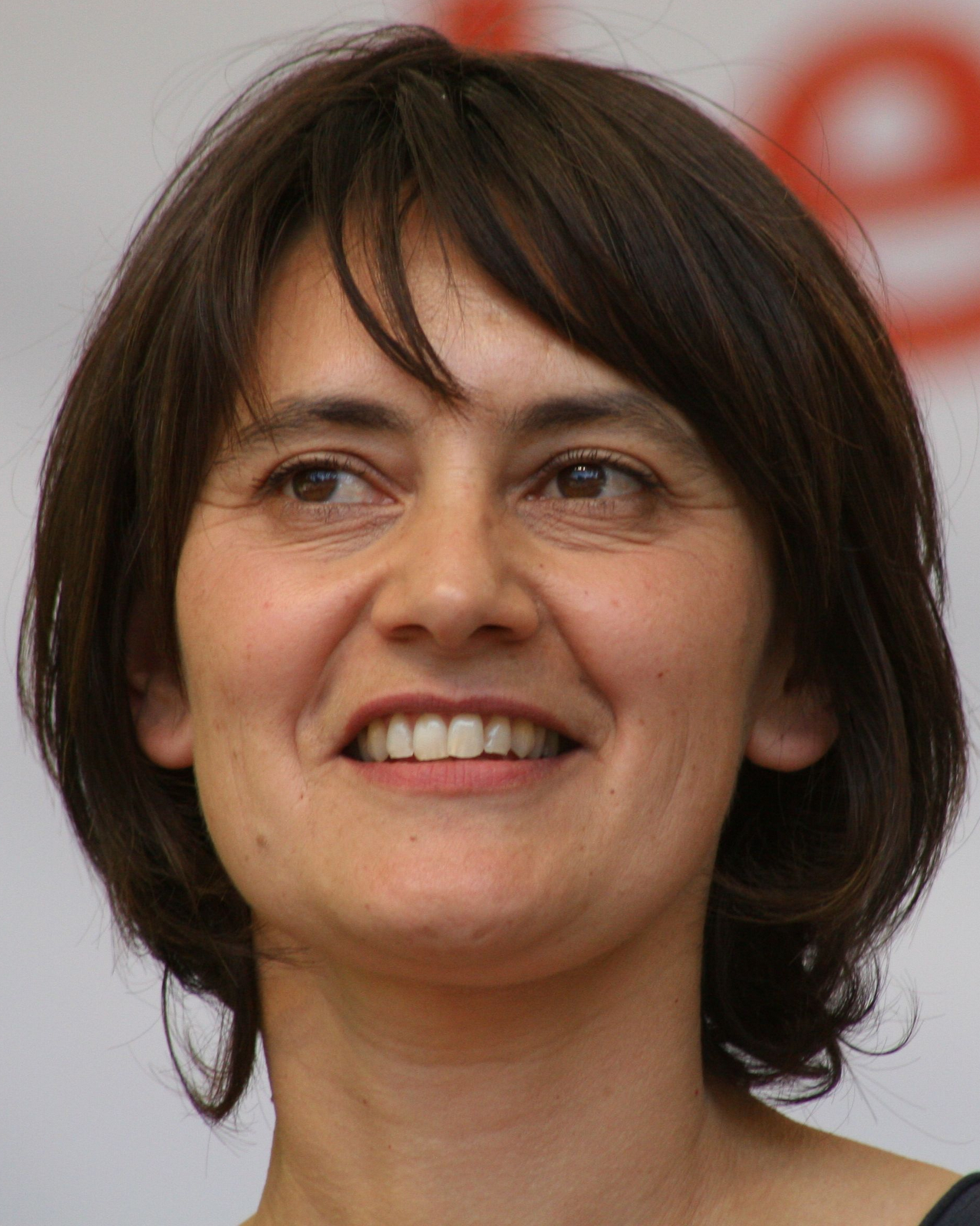
Nathalie Arthaud

The current spokesperson of Lutte Ouvrière is Nathalie Arthaud, a secondary school economics teacher. She has served as the party's spokesperson since 2008 and was the party's presidential candidate in 2012, 2017 and 2022. In December 2025, she announced her candidacy for the 2027 presidential election. Arlette Laguiller was the party's spokeswoman from 1973 to 2008 and was its presidential candidate in 1974, 1981, 1988, 1995, 2002 and 2007.

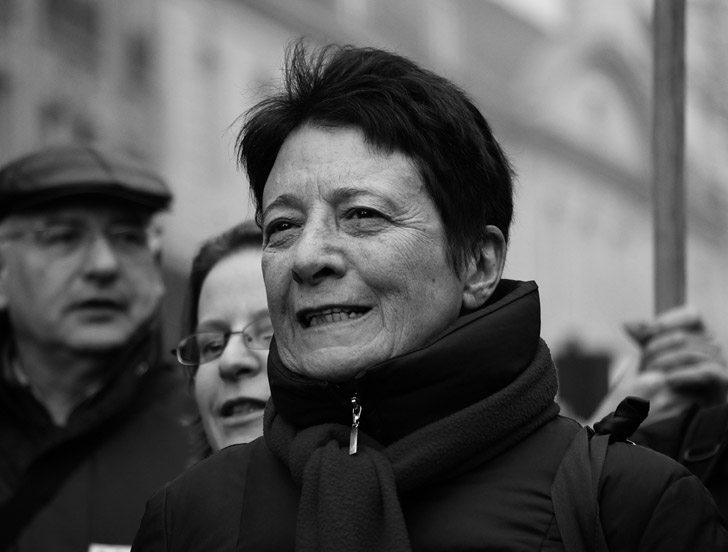
Arlette Laguiller

For long, the internal organisations of the party were largely unknown to the general public, the spokeswoman and regular presidential candidate Arlette Laguiller being the only party leader appearing in public. Even to party members, some leaders were known only by cadre names. The party justified such secrecy measures by the possibility that it may have to enter clandestinity, should a highly repressive government take power. For similar reasons, marriages and children were strongly discouraged.

Bernard Seytre, a member of LO for 20 years, confirmed the "iron discipline which rhythms the life of this Trotskyist organisation, whose responsibles [cadres] do not have the right to have children, lest they be excluded".

Lutte Ouvrière was criticised by political opponents in the 2002 presidential campaign as being a political cult, for example by Daniel Cohn-Bendit, his older brother Gabriel Cohn-Bendit, L'Humanité and Libération. In part, this strict disciplinary attitude has enabled LO to be a very stable organisation in contrast to the instability that they allege characterises so many other left groups. LO is a difficult organisation to actually join and after becoming a member, individuals are expected to conform to a code of conduct, which is considered old fashioned by some critics.

== Election results ==
=== Presidential ===
President of the French Republic
Election year	Candidate	First round			Second round			Result
Election year	Candidate	Votes	%	Rank	Votes	%	Rank	Result
1974	Arlette Laguiller	595,247	2.33	▲5th	—N/a			Lost
1981	Arlette Laguiller	668,057	2.30	▼6th	—N/a			Lost
1988	Arlette Laguiller	606,017	1.99	▼8th	—N/a			Lost
1995	Arlette Laguiller	1,615,552	5.30	▲6th	—N/a			Lost
2002	Arlette Laguiller	1,630,045	5.72	▲5th	—N/a			Lost
2007	Arlette Laguiller	487,857	1.33	▼9th	—N/a			Lost
2012	Nathalie Arthaud	202,548	0.56	9th	—N/a			Lost
2017	Nathalie Arthaud	232,384	0.64	▼10th	—N/a			Lost
2022	Nathalie Arthaud	197,094	0.56	▼12th	—N/a			Lost

=== European Parliament ===
Election	Leader	Votes	%	Seats	+/−	EP Group
1979 (Note: Run in a joint list with LCR, that won no seats.)	Arlette Laguiller	632,663	3.08 (#6)	0 / 81	New	−
1984	Arlette Laguiller	417,702	2.07 (#7)	0 / 81	0	−
1989	Arlette Laguiller	258,663	1.43 (#8)	0 / 81	0	−
1994	Arlette Laguiller	442,723	2.27 (#10)	0 / 87	0	−
1999 (Note: Run in a joint list with LCR, that won 5 seats in total.)	Arlette Laguiller	914,811	5.18 (#9)	3 / 87	▲3	GUE/NGL
2004	Arlette Laguiller	440,134	2.56 (#8)	0 / 74	▼3	−
2009	Nathalie Arthaud	205,975	1.20 (#11)	0 / 72	0	−
2014	Nathalie Arthaud	222,491	1.17 (#10)	0 / 74	0	−
2019	Nathalie Arthaud	176,339	0.78 (#14)	0 / 79	▼1	−
2024 (Note: Run in a joint list with CO, that won no seats.)	Nathalie Arthaud	121,200	0.49 (#14)	0 / 81	0	−

== International relations ==
LO maintains relations with the following other Trotskyist groups (Internationalist Communist Union):

- Workers' Fight (UK)
- The Spark (United States)
- Combat Ouvrier Guadeloupe and Martinique
- Organisation Révolutionnaire des travailleurs Haïti
- Union Africaine des Travailleurs Communistes Internationalistes (Africa)
- Sınıf Mücadelesi (Turkey)
- Lucha de Clase (Spain)
- L'Internazionale (Italy)
- Bund Revolutionärer Arbeiter (Germany)
- Lutte ouvrière (Belgium)

== See also ==
- International Workingmen's Association
- Arlette Laguiller
- Parti des Travailleurs
