= Mours-Saint-Eusèbe =

- Commune
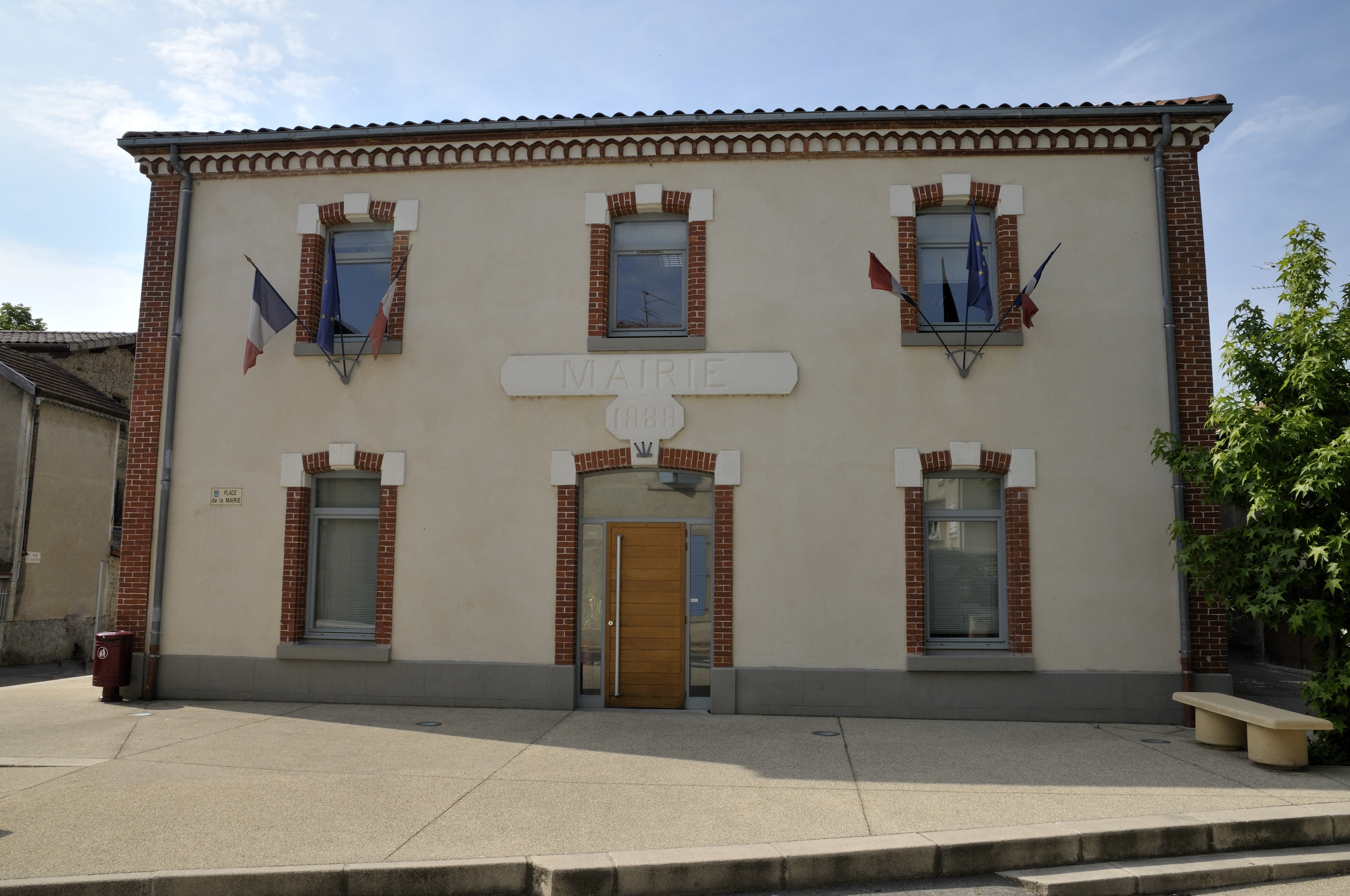
- Town hall

- Coat of arms
- Location of Mours-Saint-Eusèbe
- Location within France Location within Auvergne-Rhône-Alpes
- Coordinates: 45°04′20″N 5°03′07″E
- Country: France
- Region: Auvergne-Rhône-Alpes
- Department: Drôme
- Arrondissement: Valence
- Canton: Romans-sur-Isère
- Intercommunality: CA Valence Romans Agglo

Government
  - Mayor (2020–2026): Dominique Mombard
- Area^{1}: 5.27 km^{2} (2.03 sq mi)
- Elevation: 171 m (561 ft)
- Highest elevation: 318 m (1,043 ft)
- Lowest elevation: 173 m (568 ft)
- Population (2023): 3,424
  - Density: 650/km^{2} (1,680/sq mi)
- Time zone: UTC+01:00 (CET)
  - Summer (DST): UTC+02:00 (CEST)
- INSEE/Postal code: 26218 /26540
- ^{1} French Land Register data, which excludes lakes, ponds, glaciers > 1 km^{2} (0.386 sq mi or 247 acres) and river estuaries.

Mours-Saint-Eusèbe (Occitan: Mòrt Sant Eusèbi) is a commune in the Drôme department in southeastern France.

== Population ==
Historical population
| Year | Pop. | ±% p.a. |
|---|---|---|
| 1968 | 988 | — |
| 1975 | 1,348 | +4.54% |
| 1982 | 1,839 | +4.54% |
| 1990 | 2,027 | +1.22% |
| 1999 | 2,186 | +0.84% |
| 2007 | 2,446 | +1.41% |
| 2012 | 2,781 | +2.60% |
| 2017 | 3,153 | +2.54% |
| 2023 | 3,424 | +1.38% |
Source: INSEE

== See also ==
- Communes of the Drôme department
