= Châtillon-Saint-Jean =

- Commune
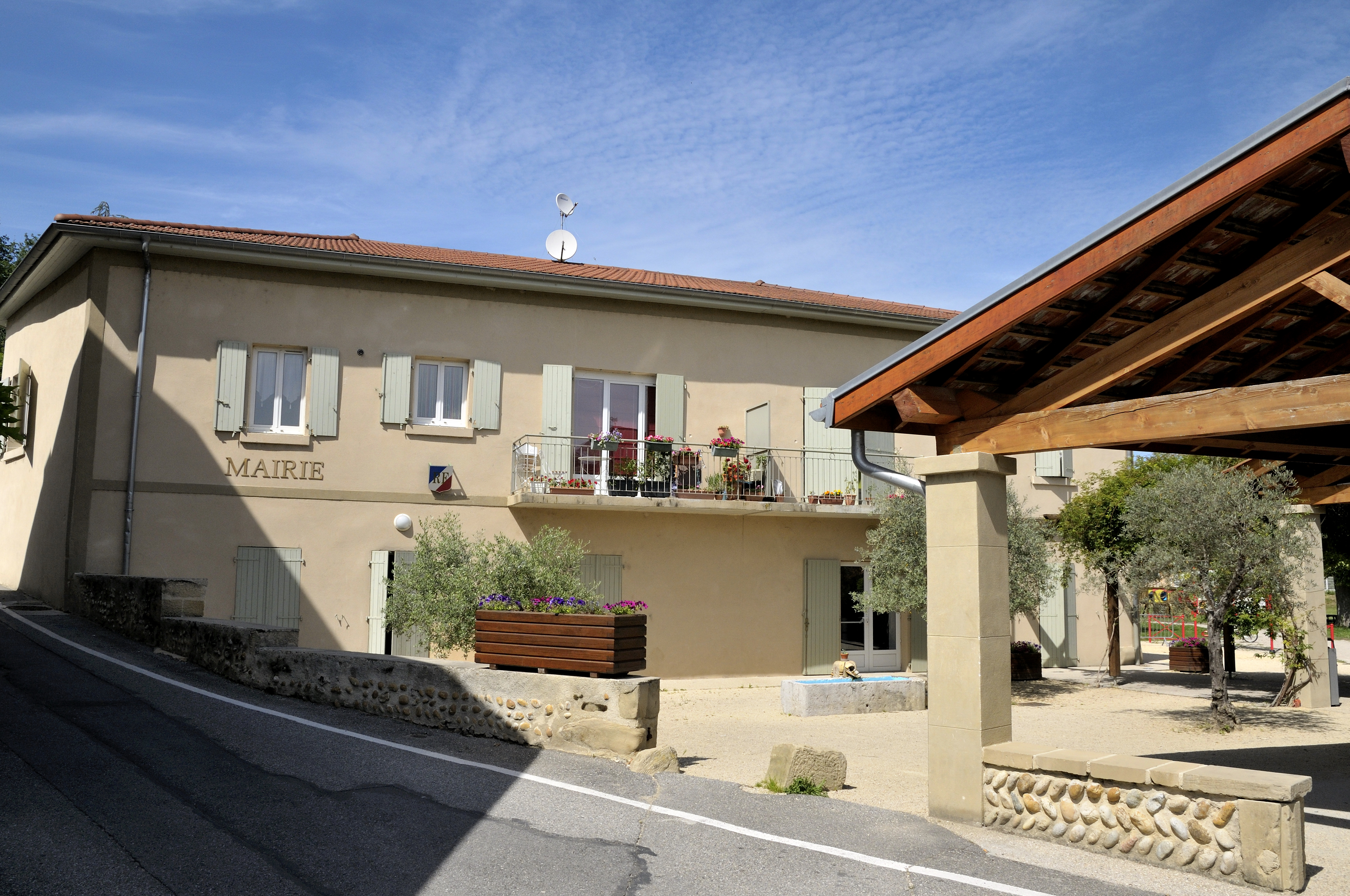
- Town hall
- Location of Châtillon-Saint-Jean
- Location within France Location within Auvergne-Rhône-Alpes
- Coordinates: 45°05′20″N 5°07′54″E
- Country: France
- Region: Auvergne-Rhône-Alpes
- Department: Drôme
- Arrondissement: Valence
- Canton: Romans-sur-Isère
- Intercommunality: CA Valence Romans Agglo

Government
  - Mayor (2020–2026): Daniel Barruyer
- Area^{1}: 8.82 km^{2} (3.41 sq mi)
- Elevation: 194 m (636 ft)
- Highest elevation: 343 m (1,125 ft)
- Lowest elevation: 192 m (630 ft)
- Population (2023): 1,305
  - Density: 148/km^{2} (383/sq mi)
- Time zone: UTC+01:00 (CET)
  - Summer (DST): UTC+02:00 (CEST)
- INSEE/Postal code: 26087 /26750
- ^{1} French Land Register data, which excludes lakes, ponds, glaciers > 1 km^{2} (0.386 sq mi or 247 acres) and river estuaries.

Châtillon-Saint-Jean (French pronunciation: [ʃatijɔ̃ sɛ̃ ʒɑ̃]; Vivaro-Alpine: Chastilhon e Sent Joan) is a commune in the Drôme department in southeastern France.

== Population ==
Historical population
Year	Pop.	±% p.a.
1968	672	—
1975	680	+0.17%
1982	754	+1.49%
1990	790	+0.58%
1999	888	+1.31%
2007	1,194	+3.77%
2012	1,280	+1.40%
2017	1,359	+1.20%
2023	1,305	−0.67%
Source: INSEE

== See also ==
- Communes of the Drôme department
