= Comme un coup de tonnerre =

2002 French election documentary

- Directed by: Stéphane Meunier
- Country of origin: France
- Original language: French

Original release
- Release: 2002

Comme un coup de tonnerre ("Like A Thunderclap") is a French documentary about socialist candidate Lionel Jospin's campaign of 2002 for president and his subsequent ousting from the second round by Jean-Marie Le Pen. It was directed by Stéphane Meunier.

== Similar works ==
- À Hauteur d'homme: Documentary about Bernard Landry's re-election campaign of 2003 in Quebec, Canada.
- The War Room: American documentary about Bill Clinton's primary campaign and first presidential election of 1992.
- Street Fight: An Academy Award-nominated documentary about Cory Booker's ultimately unsuccessful 2002 run against Sharpe James for mayor of Newark, New Jersey, United States by filmmaker Marshall Curry.

== See also ==
- Lionel Jospin
- 2002 French presidential election
