= Saint-Paul-lès-Romans =

- Commune
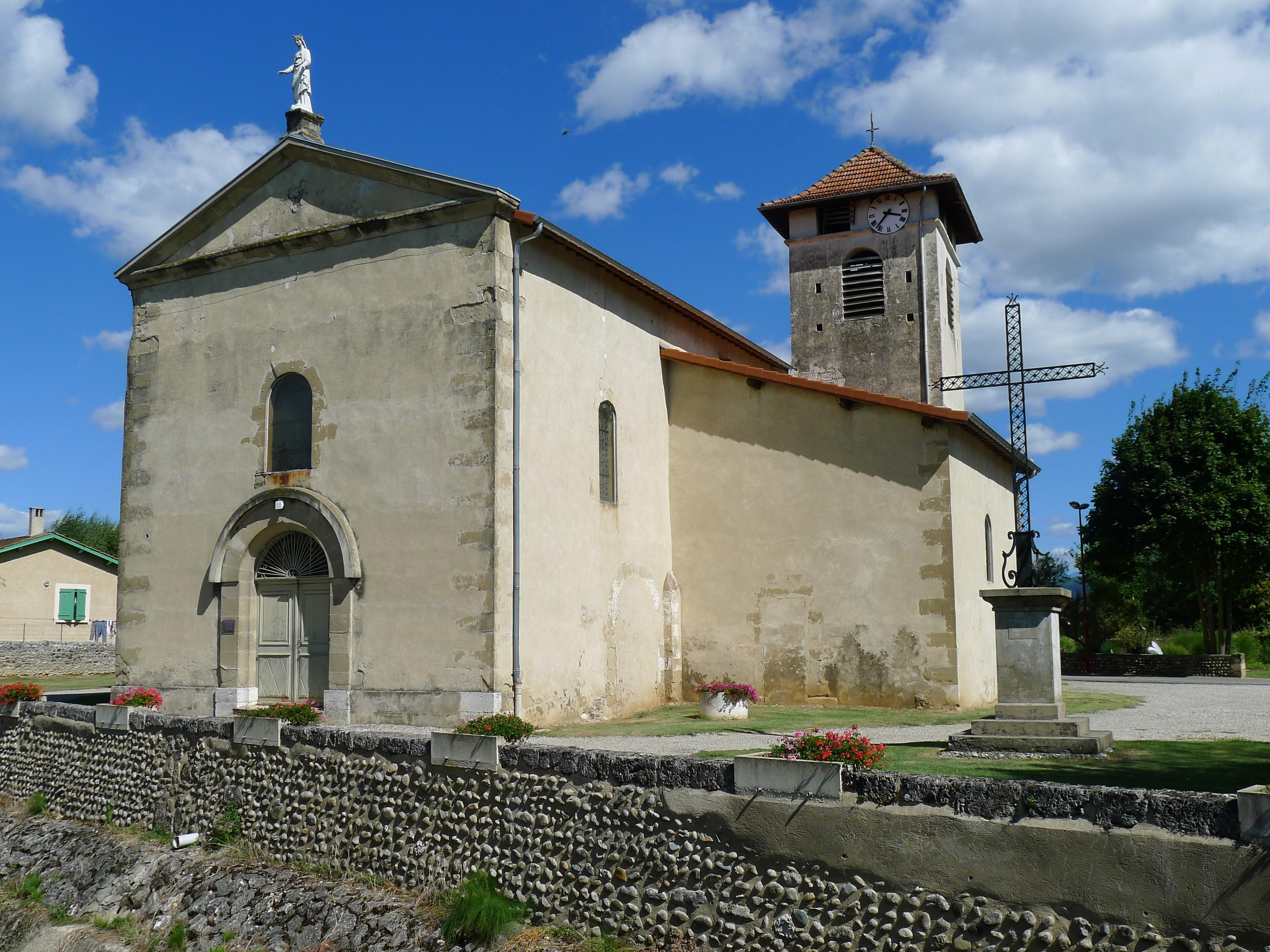
- The church of Saint-Paul-lès-Romans
- Location of Saint-Paul-lès-Romans
- Location within France Location within Auvergne-Rhône-Alpes
- Coordinates: 45°04′05″N 5°07′59″E
- Country: France
- Region: Auvergne-Rhône-Alpes
- Department: Drôme
- Arrondissement: Valence
- Canton: Romans-sur-Isère
- Intercommunality: CA Valence Romans Agglo

Government
  - Mayor (2020–2026): Gérard Lunel
- Area^{1}: 15.77 km^{2} (6.09 sq mi)
- Elevation: 186 m (610 ft)
- Highest elevation: 200 m (660 ft)
- Lowest elevation: 140 m (460 ft)
- Population (2023): 1,916
  - Density: 121.5/km^{2} (314.7/sq mi)
- Time zone: UTC+01:00 (CET)
  - Summer (DST): UTC+02:00 (CEST)
- INSEE/Postal code: 26323 /26750
- ^{1} French Land Register data, which excludes lakes, ponds, glaciers > 1 km^{2} (0.386 sq mi or 247 acres) and river estuaries.

Saint-Paul-lès-Romans (French pronunciation: [sɛ̃ pɔl lɛ ʁɔmɑ̃], literally Saint-Paul near Romans; Vivaro-Alpine: Sant Pau de Rumans) is a commune in the Drôme department in southeastern France.

== Population ==
Historical population
Year	Pop.	±% p.a.
1968	865	—
1975	960	+1.50%
1982	1,301	+4.44%
1990	1,401	+0.93%
1999	1,502	+0.78%
2007	1,690	+1.49%
2012	1,787	+1.12%
2017	1,822	+0.39%
2023	1,916	+0.84%
Source: INSEE

== See also ==
- Communes of the Drôme department
