= Peyrins =

- Commune
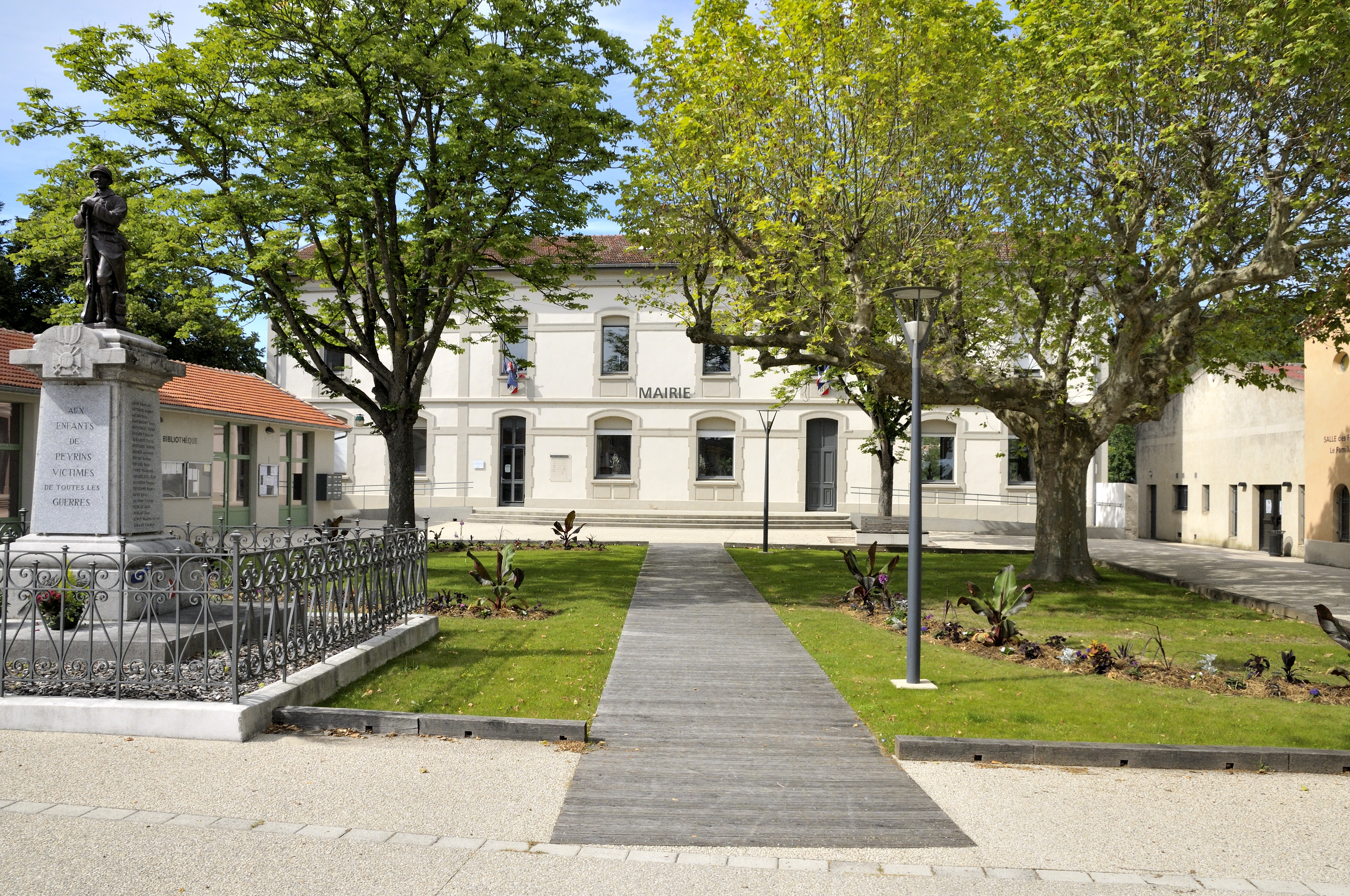
- Town hall

- Coat of arms
- Location of Peyrins
- Location within France Location within Auvergne-Rhône-Alpes
- Coordinates: 45°05′38″N 5°02′53″E
- Country: France
- Region: Auvergne-Rhône-Alpes
- Department: Drôme
- Arrondissement: Valence
- Canton: Romans-sur-Isère
- Intercommunality: CA Valence Romans Agglo

Government
  - Mayor (2020–2026): Philippe Barneron
- Area^{1}: 25.16 km^{2} (9.71 sq mi)
- Elevation: 203 m (666 ft)
- Highest elevation: 434 m (1,424 ft)
- Lowest elevation: 175 m (574 ft)
- Population (2023): 2,613
  - Density: 103.9/km^{2} (269.0/sq mi)
- Time zone: UTC+01:00 (CET)
  - Summer (DST): UTC+02:00 (CEST)
- INSEE/Postal code: 26231 /26380
- ^{1} French Land Register data, which excludes lakes, ponds, glaciers > 1 km^{2} (0.386 sq mi or 247 acres) and river estuaries.

Peyrins (French pronunciation: [pɛʁɛ̃]; Occitan: Pairin) is a commune in the Drôme department, southeastern France.

== Population ==
Historical population
Year	Pop.	±% p.a.
1968	1,302	—
1975	1,652	+3.46%
1982	1,882	+1.88%
1990	2,055	+1.11%
1999	2,309	+1.30%
2007	2,455	+0.77%
2012	2,493	+0.31%
2017	2,751	+1.99%
2023	2,613	−0.85%
Source: INSEE

== See also ==
- Communes of the Drôme department
