= David Korner =

French communist militant, trade unionist, and journalist (1914–1976)

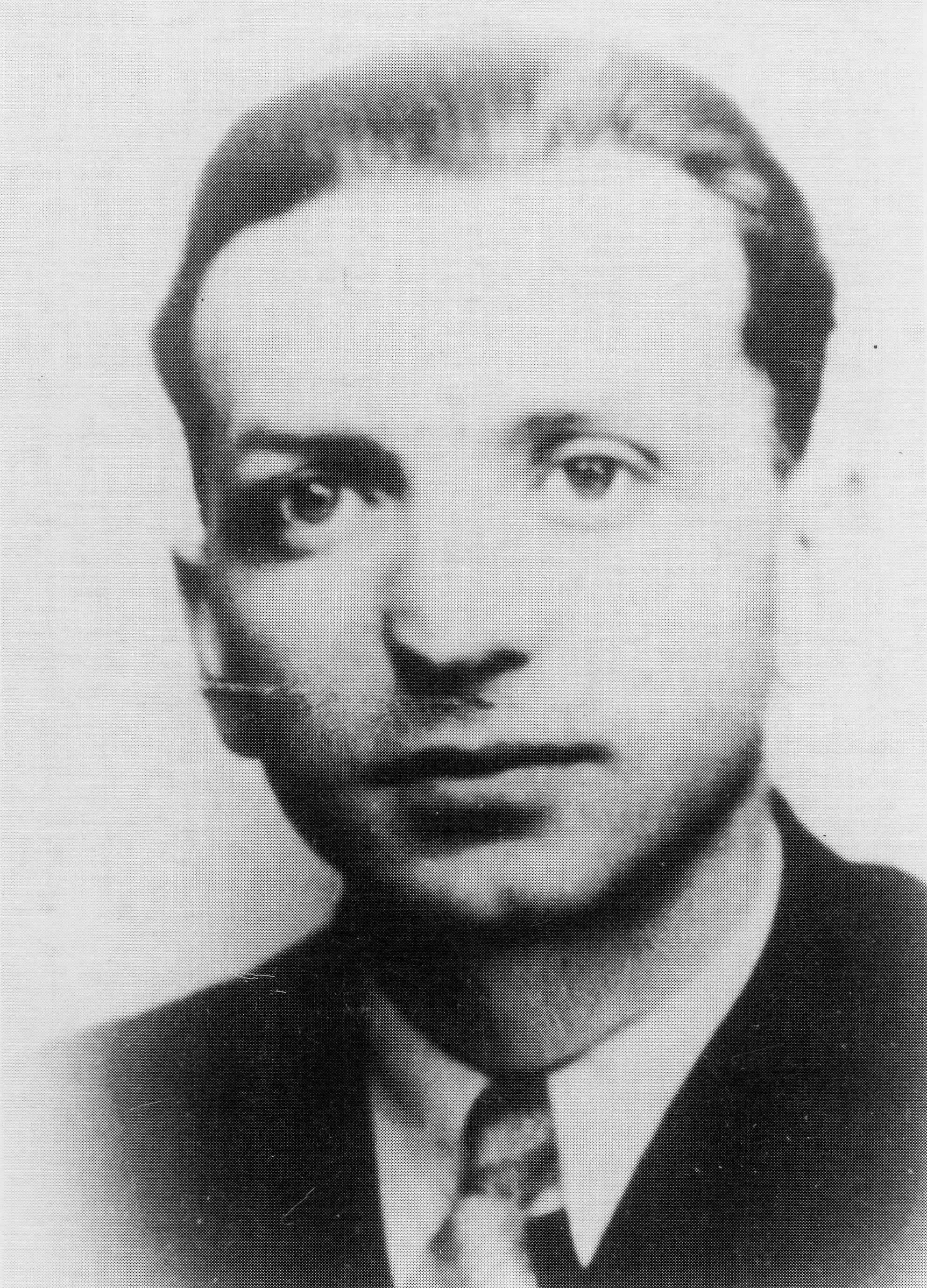
- Born: David Korner; October 19, 1914; Bacău, Kingdom of Romania
- Died: September 6, 1976 (aged 61); Paris, France
- Citizenship: Romania · French
- Years active: 1932–late 1960s
- Organization(s): Romanian Communist Party; Bolshevik Leninist Group of Romania
- Known for: Trotskyism in France

David Korner (also known as Barta, Albert, and A. Mathieu; October 19, 1914 – September 6, 1976) was a Romanian and French communist militant, trade unionist, and journalist. A Trotskyist for most of his life, he was active in the labor movement of France from the 1930s to the 1960s.

== Life and career ==
Born into a Jewish family, Korner was a member of the Romanian Communist Party (PCR) in 1932–1933. In July 1933, alongside Gheorghe Gheorghiu-Dej, Constantin Doncea and other PCR activists, he was brought to trial in front of a Bucharest court for his part in convening the Griviţa Strike, and ultimately sentenced to 18 months in jail.

Recruited to Trotskyism as a student in Paris in the 1934, he formed the Bolshevik Leninist Group of Romania upon his return to Romania (April 1935). The latter faction opposed the Stalinist PCR, as well as the Social Democrats and the Unitary Socialist Party of Leon Ghelerter. When the Spanish Civil War and the June 1936 strikes took place, Korner again returned to France and was a member of the Internationalist Workers Party (POI).

In line with Leon Trotsky's advice to his French followers to enter the Workers and Peasants Socialist Party (PSOP) he joined that party and stood on its far left (see French Turn). Upon the start of World War II, as the PSOP collapsed, he formed the tiny Trotskyist Group in opposition to what he considered the petty bourgeois methods of organization of the other French Trotskyist groups, as well as to the politics of mainstream socialist party (the French Section of the Workers' International). This group was active in clandestinity under the Nazi German occupation of France, and later became the Communist Union (UC).

The group concentrated on factory work but also maintained the regular production of its political publications and took part in agitation against the colonial politics of France. The factory work came to fruition with the Renault strike of 1947, which Korner's group helped lead and organize. The request for support addressed by the newly formed Democratic Trade Union of Renault (SDR) was accepted by the UC, which effectively caused a merger between the two.

While the SDR broke apart in 1949, the political grouping was revived only briefly in 1950, without enlisting support; when some former militants of the UC began publishing Voix Ouvrière in 1956 (later known as Lutte Ouvrière), Barta did not partake in the move (although, as late as 1964, Bois, a leader of Voix Ouvrière, was still writing to him to request his involvement). Relations between Barta and the leadership of the Voix Ouvrière group remained poor until his death, in part because Barta believed that the group had wrongly appropriated his work and was philistine in its methods.
