= Guy Héraud =

French politician and lawyer

Guy Héraud (29 October 1920, in Avignon – 28 December 2003) was a French politician and lawyer. He was the candidate of the European Federalist Party in the 1974 French presidential election, where he won only 0.08% of the vote (19,255 votes nationwide) and last place. As of 2017, his result remains the lowest score ever obtained by a candidate in any French direct presidential election.

Guy Héraud was also the author of books on federalism. He was an expert on minority issues and problems of European federalism.
