= Clérieux =

- Commune
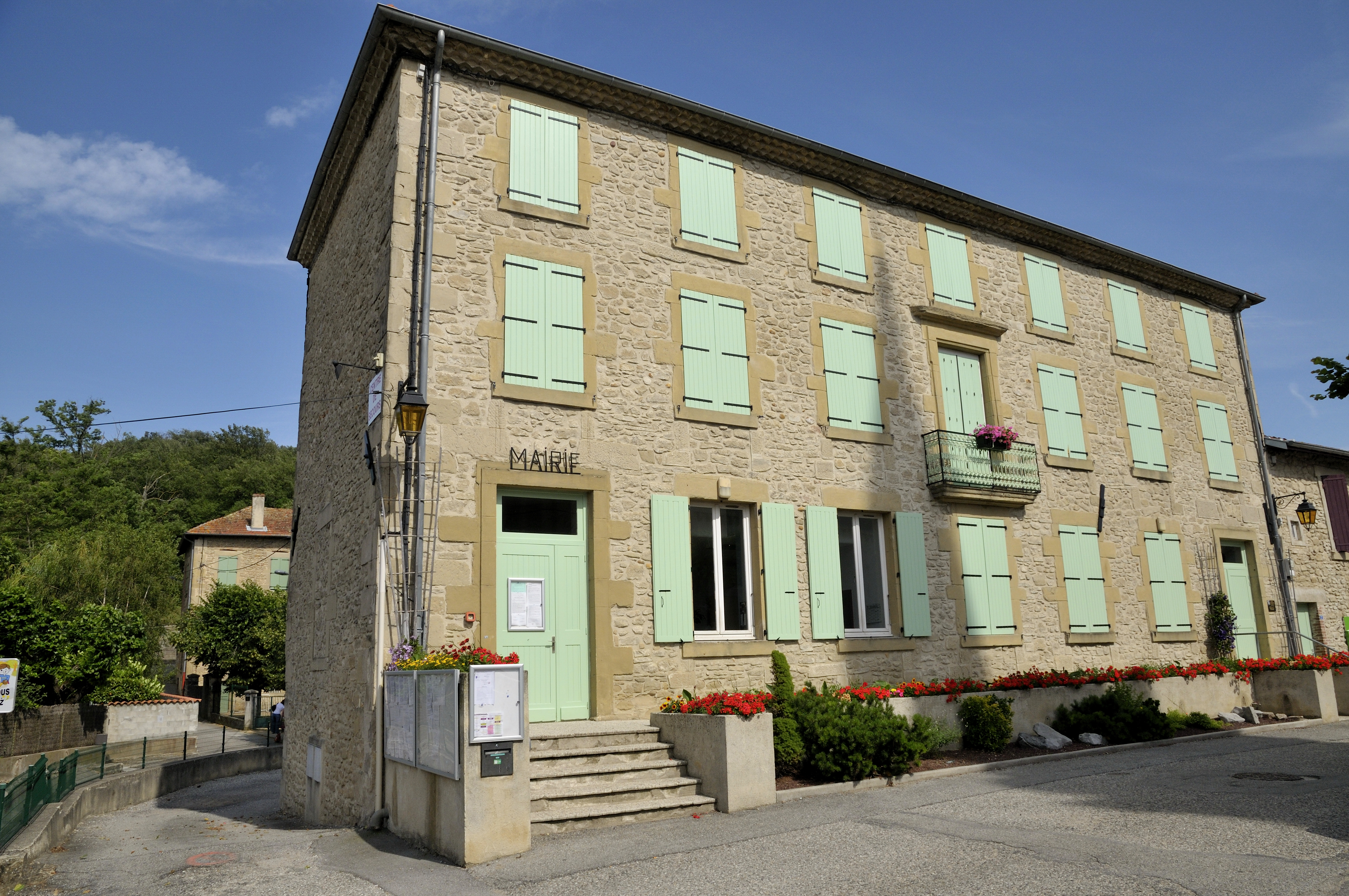
- Town hall
- Location of Clérieux
- Location within France Location within Auvergne-Rhône-Alpes
- Coordinates: 45°04′45″N 4°57′36″E
- Country: France
- Region: Auvergne-Rhône-Alpes
- Department: Drôme
- Arrondissement: Valence
- Canton: Romans-sur-Isère
- Intercommunality: CA Valence Romans Agglo

Government
  - Mayor (2020–2026): Fabrice Larue
- Area^{1}: 13.53 km^{2} (5.22 sq mi)
- Elevation: 144 m (472 ft)
- Highest elevation: 245 m (804 ft)
- Lowest elevation: 141 m (463 ft)
- Population (2023): 1,910
  - Density: 141/km^{2} (366/sq mi)
- Time zone: UTC+01:00 (CET)
  - Summer (DST): UTC+02:00 (CEST)
- INSEE/Postal code: 26096 /26069
- ^{1} French Land Register data, which excludes lakes, ponds, glaciers > 1 km^{2} (0.386 sq mi or 247 acres) and river estuaries.

Clérieux (French pronunciation: [kleʁjø]; Occitan: Claireu) is a commune in the Drôme department in southeastern France.

== Population ==
Historical population
Year	Pop.	±% p.a.
1968	1,326	—
1975	1,273	−0.58%
1982	1,354	+0.89%
1990	1,605	+2.15%
1999	1,833	+1.49%
2007	2,017	+1.20%
2012	2,033	+0.16%
2017	2,017	−0.16%
2023	1,910	−0.90%
Source: INSEE

== See also ==
- Communes of the Drôme department
