= Arlette Laguiller =

French politician (born 1940)

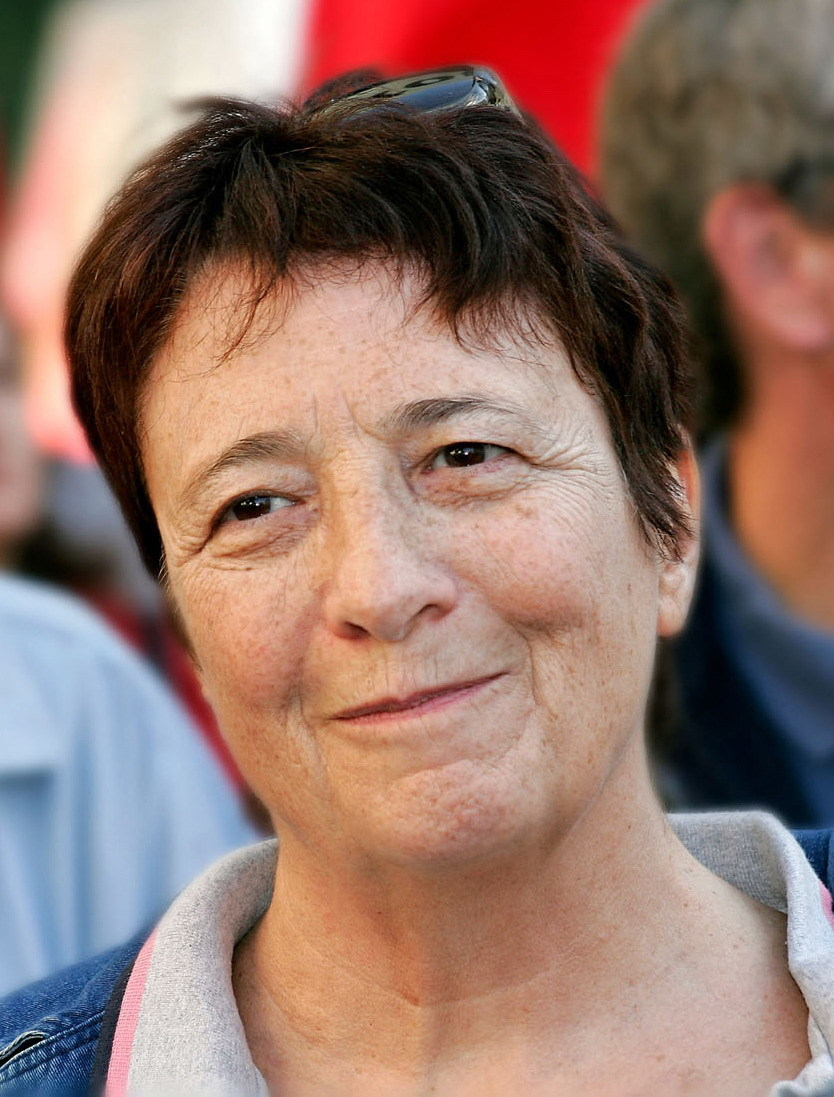

Spokesperson of Workers' Struggle
- In office 1973–2008
- Succeeded by: Nathalie Arthaud

Member of the European Parliament
- In office 1999–2004

Member of the Regional Council of Île-de-France
- In office 1998–2004
- President: Jean-Paul Huchon

Personal details
- Born: 18 March 1940 (age 86) Les Lilas, Paris, French Third Republic
- Party: Workers' Struggle

Arlette Yvonne Laguiller (French pronunciation: [aʁlɛt laɡije]; born 18 March 1940) is a French politician. From 1973 to 2008, she was the spokeswoman and the best-known leader and presidential nominee of Lutte Ouvrière (LO), a Trotskyist political party.

== Career ==
Born at Les Lilas, Seine-Saint-Denis, France, Arlette became a clerical worker in a bank. She was a member of the CGT until 1965 when she was expelled for her Trotskyist views. She joined Lutte Ouvrière in 1968. She became the leader of a 1974 bank workers' strike that began with the actions of employees at Crédit Lyonnais. She continues to live in a council high-rise in Les Lilas and her only income is her pension from the bank where she worked for 40 years.

She has been a frequent candidate for the French presidency, starting with the election of 1974, and continuing through those of 1981, 1988, 1995, 2002, and 2007. She was the first female candidate to the French presidency. Her best result was in 2002 when she came in fifth place and received 5.72% of the vote. In December 2005, Laguiller announced that she would run for president for the sixth and final time in 2007. After finishing a distant ninth in 2007's first round of voting (487,857 votes, totaling 1.33% of the popular vote), for the first time since 1981, she endorsed the Socialist Party candidate (Ségolène Royal) for the second round. In the past, Laguiller and LO have often refrained from openly supporting the Socialist Party and take a neutral stance in the second round.

== Popular culture ==
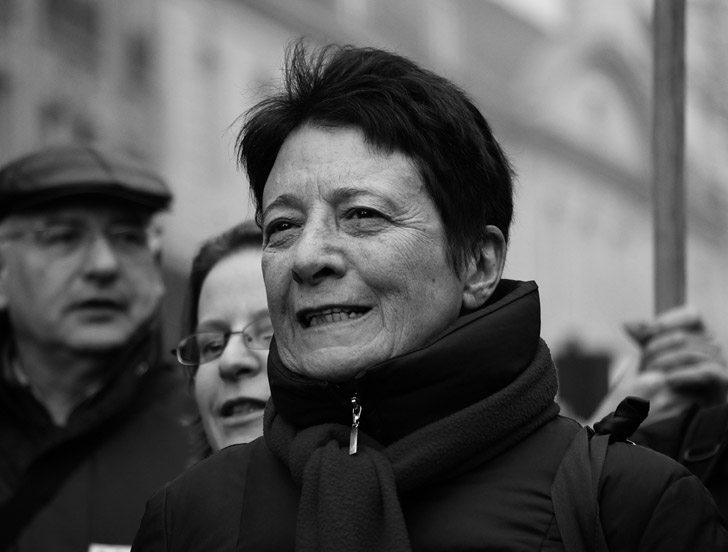

The puppet show, Les Guignols de l'info frequently caricatured Laguiller as saying, "Travailleuses, travailleurs ! On vous ment, on vous spolie !" ("Female workers, male workers! You are being lied to, you are being robbed!"). Laguiller indeed did begin most of her speeches with the formula, "Travailleuses, travailleurs!".

In 1995, pop singer Alain Souchon recorded the song Arlette Laguiller, commenting that, "Her words, of course, may be a little worn-out," but praising her "peppermint-fresh" way of expressing them, and indicating that, "When Arlette sings, you feel a real sense of love." He has since lost his soft spot for Laguiller after she refused to back Jacques Chirac against Jean-Marie Le Pen in the 2002 presidential election and has stated that he won't sing the song again. Although, in 2008 Laguiller mentioned that Souchon had started singing the song again.
