= Opinion polling for the 2007 French presidential election =

This page lists public opinion polls conducted for the 2007 French presidential election, which was held on 22 April 2007 with a run-off on 6 May 2007.

Unless otherwise noted, all polls listed below are compliant with the regulations of the national polling commission (Commission nationale des sondages) and utilize the quota method.

== First round ==
During the 2007 presidential election, Ipsos launched the first ever rolling poll in France, described as a "continuous electoral barometer", publishing results every day of the week except Sunday for ten weeks starting on 1 March 2007. The Ifop poll conducted from 23 to 26 February 2007, marked with an asterisk (*) below, was conducted specifically for subsample data.

The publication of first-round polls was prohibited after midnight on 20 April 2007. The TNS Sofres poll conducted from 20 to 21 April was an internal survey which was not distributed during the electoral silence.

=== Graphical summary ===
The averages in the graphs below were constructed using polls listed below conducted by the six major French pollsters. The graphs are smoothed 14-day weighted moving averages, using only the most recent poll conducted by any given pollster within that range (each poll weighted based on recency).

On 6 November 2006, Jean-Pierre Chevènement announced his candidacy in the presidential election, before withdrawing just a month later on 10 December 2006 after concluding an agreement with the Socialist Party (PS) for an alliance in the subsequent legislative elections. On 7 November, Nicolas Hulot launched an appeal to candidates to commit to an "Ecological Pact", but affirmed that he would on 22 January 2007 that he would not stand as a candidate in the election. In an interview published on 28 December 2006, Michèle Alliot-Marie evoked the possibility of a candidacy without the support of her party, having recently founded the think tank "Le Chêne"; however, she ultimately announced her support for Nicolas Sarkozy on 12 January 2007. In an interview published on 11 March, Corinne Lepage announced that she would back François Bayrou despite having "the capacity" to obtain the 500 sponsorships necessary to be a candidate. In an interview published on 17 March, Nicolas Dupont-Aignan announced that he had failed to gather enough sponsorships to stand in the election. Jacques Chirac announced on 11 March that he would not seek a third term, before finally backing the candidacy of Sarkozy on 21 March.

Because the TNS Sofres poll conducted from 20 to 21 April was not published during the electoral silence, it is not included in the average below.

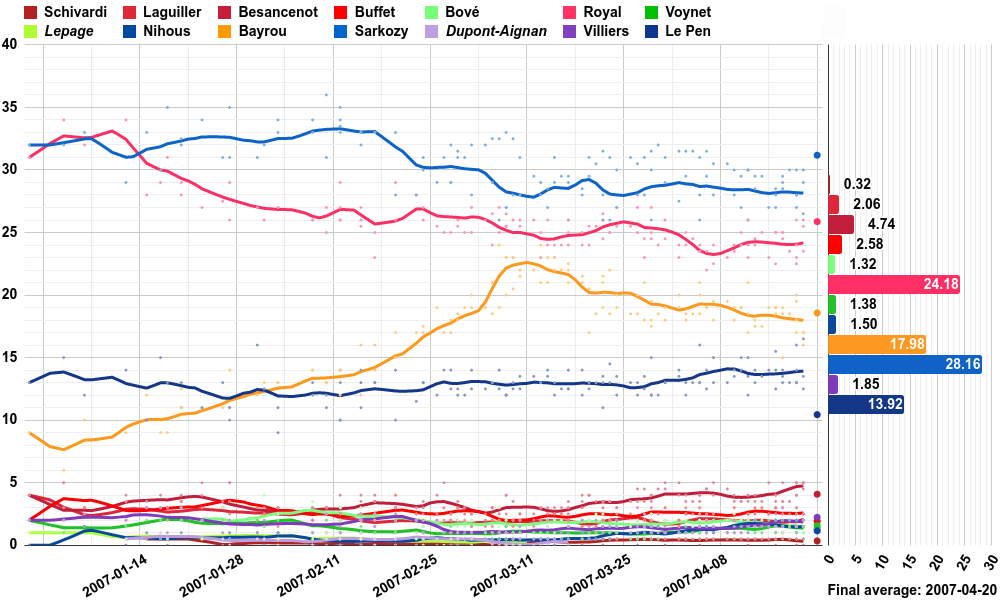

=== Official campaign ===
Polling firm	Fieldwork date	Sample size	Abs.	Schivardi PT	Laguiller LO	Besancenot LCR	Buffet PCF	Bové SE	Royal PS	Voynet LV	Nihous CPNT	Bayrou UDF	Sarkozy UMP	Villiers MPF	Le Pen FN
2007 election	22 Apr 2007	–	16.23%	0.34%	1.33%	4.08%	1.93%	1.32%	25.87%	1.57%	1.15%	18.57%	31.18%	2.23%	10.44%
TNS Sofres	20–21 Apr 2007	1,000	–	0.5%	1.5%	4%	2%	1.5%	25%	1%	1%	18%	30%	2.5%	13%
BVA	20 Apr 2007	810	–	0.5%	2.5%	5%	2.5%	1%	26%	1%	1%	17%	29%	2%	12.5%
CSA	20 Apr 2007	1,002	–	<0.5%	2%	5%	2.5%	1.5%	25.5%	1.5%	1.5%	16%	26.5%	1.5%	16.5%
Ipsos	19–20 Apr 2007	1,598	–	0.5%	2%	4.5%	2.5%	1%	23.5%	1.5%	2%	17%	30%	2%	13.5%
CSA	18–19 Apr 2007	1,002	–	<0.5%	1%	5%	1.5%	3%	26%	1.5%	1%	17%	27%	1%	16%
Ipsos	18–19 Apr 2007	1,209	–	0.5%	1.5%	4%	2.5%	1.5%	23%	1.5%	2%	18%	30%	2.5%	13%
TNS Sofres	18–19 Apr 2007	1,000	–	<0.5%	1.5%	5%	2.5%	1.5%	24%	1%	1.5%	19.5%	28%	1.5%	14%
Ifop-Fiducial	17–19 Apr 2007	952	–	0.5%	2%	4%	3%	1.5%	22.5%	1.5%	1.5%	20%	28%	2.5%	13%
Ipsos	17–18 Apr 2007	1,212	–	0.5%	1.5%	3.5%	2.5%	1.5%	23.5%	1.5%	2%	18.5%	30%	2%	13%
BVA	16–17 Apr 2007	887	–	1%	2%	5%	3%	2%	25%	1%	1%	15%	29%	3%	13%
Ipsos	16–17 Apr 2007	1,009	–	0.5%	1%	3.5%	2.5%	1.5%	24.5%	1.5%	2%	18.5%	29.5%	1.5%	13.5%
TNS Sofres	16–17 Apr 2007	1,000	–	0.5%	1.5%	3.5%	2.5%	1%	25%	1.5%	1.5%	19%	28.5%	1.5%	14%
CSA	16 Apr 2007	1,006	–	<0.5%	1%	4%	2%	1.5%	25%	2%	1.5%	19%	27%	1.5%	15.5%
Ifop	14–16 Apr 2007	954	–	0.5%	3%	4%	3%	1.5%	22.5%	1.5%	2%	19%	28%	2.5%	12.5%
Ipsos	14–16 Apr 2007	1,357	–	0.5%	1%	3.5%	3%	1.5%	25%	1%	2%	18.5%	28.5%	1.5%	14%
LH2	13–15 Apr 2007	1,004	–	0.5%	2.5%	5%	2.5%	1.5%	23%	2%	1.5%	19%	27%	1.5%	14%
Ipsos	12–14 Apr 2007	1,355	–	0.5%	1.5%	3.5%	3%	2%	25%	1%	1.5%	17.5%	29.5%	1.5%	13.5%
Ifop	12–13 Apr 2007	928	–	0.5%	2%	4%	3%	2%	24%	1%	2%	18%	28.5%	2%	13%
Ipsos	11–13 Apr 2007	1,279	–	0.5%	1.5%	3.5%	2.5%	1.5%	24.5%	1.5%	2%	17.5%	29.5%	1.5%	14%
CSA	11–12 Apr 2007	918	–	0.5%	2%	4%	2.5%	1.5%	23%	1%	2%	21%	26%	1.5%	15%
TNS Sofres	11–12 Apr 2007	1,000	–	<0.5%	2.5%	4%	2.5%	2%	26%	1.5%	1.5%	17%	30%	1%	12%
Ipsos	10–12 Apr 2007	1,207	–	0.5%	1.5%	3.5%	2%	1.5%	24%	1.5%	2%	18.5%	30%	1.5%	13.5%
CSA	10–11 Apr 2007	876	–	0.5%	2%	3.5%	2%	2%	25%	1.5%	1.5%	19%	27%	1%	15%
Ipsos	9–11 Apr 2007	1,209	–	0.5%	2%	3.5%	1.5%	2%	24%	1.5%	1.5%	19%	29.5%	1%	14%
BVA	10 Apr 2007	867	–	0.5%	2%	3.5%	3%	2%	24%	1%	2%	18%	28%	2%	14%
Ipsos	7–10 Apr 2007	1,300	–	0.5%	2%	4%	1.5%	2.5%	23.5%	1%	1.5%	19%	30%	1%	13.5%
Ipsos	6–9 Apr 2007	1,355	–	0.5%	2%	4.5%	2%	2%	23%	1%	1%	19.5%	30.5%	1%	13%
LH2	6–7 Apr 2007	1,009	–	0.5%	1.5%	4%	2.5%	2%	24%	2%	1%	18%	28%	1.5%	15%
Ipsos	5–7 Apr 2007	1,355	–	0.5%	2%	5%	2.5%	1.5%	22.5%	1%	1%	19.5%	30.5%	1%	13%
Ifop	5–6 Apr 2007	953	–	0.5%	2%	4.5%	2.5%	2%	22%	1.5%	1.5%	19%	29.5%	1%	14%
Ipsos	4–6 Apr 2007	1,263	–	0.5%	2%	4.5%	2.5%	1%	23.5%	1%	1%	19%	31.5%	1%	12.5%
CSA	4–5 Apr 2007	881	–	0.5%	2%	3.5%	2%	1.5%	23.5%	1.5%	1.5%	21%	26%	1%	16%
TNS Sofres	4–5 Apr 2007	1,000	–	<0.5%	2.5%	4%	3%	2%	23.5%	1%	1.5%	20%	28%	1.5%	13%
Ipsos	3–5 Apr 2007	1,208	–	0.5%	2%	4%	2.5%	1.5%	24%	1%	1%	18.5%	31%	1%	13%
Ipsos	2–4 Apr 2007	1,209	–	0.5%	1.5%	3.5%	2.5%	1.5%	24.5%	1%	1%	18.5%	31.5%	1%	13%
BVA	2–3 Apr 2007	860	–	0.5%	3%	4%	2.5%	2%	24%	1%	1%	18%	29.5%	2.5%	12%
Ipsos	31 Mar–3 Apr 2007	1,272	–	0.5%	1%	3.5%	2.5%	1%	25%	1.5%	1%	18.5%	31.5%	1%	13%
Ifop	31 Mar–2 Apr 2007	846	–	0.5%	2%	5%	2%	2%	23%	1%	1.5%	20%	27.5%	1.5%	14%
Ipsos	30 Mar–2 Apr 2007	1,344	–	0.5%	1.5%	4%	2%	1%	24%	1%	1%	19%	31.5%	1%	13.5%
LH2	30–31 Mar 2007	1,003	–	<0.5%	1%	5%	3%	2%	26%	1%	1%	18%	29%	1%	13%
Ipsos	29–31 Mar 2007	1,341	–	0.5%	1.5%	4.5%	2%	1%	24.5%	1%	1%	19%	31%	1%	13%
Ipsos	28–30 Mar 2007	1,277	–	0.5%	1.5%	4.5%	2.5%	1.5%	24%	0.5%	1.5%	18.5%	32%	1%	12%
CSA	28–29 Mar 2007	922	–	0.5%	2%	3%	4%	2%	24.5%	1%	1%	19.5%	26%	1.5%	15%
TNS Sofres	28–29 Mar 2007	1,000	–	0.5%	1%	3.5%	2.5%	2.5%	27%	1%	1%	18%	30%	1%	12%
Ipsos	27–29 Mar 2007	1,104	–	0.5%	2%	4%	2.5%	1.5%	25%	0.5%	1.5%	17.5%	31.5%	1.5%	12%
Ifop-Fiducial	26–28 Mar 2007	954	–	0.5%	2%	3.5%	2.5%	1.5%	23%	1%	1%	21%	28%	2.5%	13.5%
Ipsos	26–28 Mar 2007	1,006	–	0.5%	2%	4.5%	2%	1.5%	24.5%	0.5%	1.5%	18%	31%	1.5%	12.5%
BVA	26–27 Mar 2007	873	–	0.5%	3%	4.5%	2%	1%	27%	1%	<0.5%	20%	28%	1%	12%
Ipsos	24–27 Mar 2007	1,110	–	0.5%	2%	3.5%	2%	2%	25%	0.5%	1%	18.5%	30.5%	1.5%	13%
Ipsos	23–26 Mar 2007	1,247	–	0.5%	1.5%	3.5%	2.5%	1.5%	25.5%	0.5%	1%	18.5%	31%	1%	13%
LH2	23–24 Mar 2007	1,004	–	0.5%	2.5%	3%	2%	1.5%	27%	1%	2%	20%	27%	1.5%	12%
Ipsos	22–24 Mar 2007	1,245	–	0.5%	2%	3%	2%	1.5%	25.5%	1%	1%	19%	30%	1%	13.5%
Ifop	22–23 Mar 2007	872	–	0.5%	2%	3.5%	2%	1%	25%	1%	0.5%	22%	26%	2%	14.5%
Ipsos	21–23 Mar 2007	1,143	–	0.5%	2%	3.5%	2%	1.5%	25%	1%	0.5%	18.5%	31%	1.5%	13%
CSA	21–22 Mar 2007	894	–	0.5%	2%	3.5%	3%	2%	26%	1%	0.5%	21%	26%	1.5%	13%
TNS Sofres	21–22 Mar 2007	1,000	–	<0.5%	2%	3.5%	2%	2.5%	26.5%	1%	1%	21.5%	28%	1%	11%
Ipsos	20–22 Mar 2007	1,006	–	0.5%	1%	3.5%	1.5%	2%	24.5%	1%	0.5%	19%	31.5%	1.5%	13.5%
Ipsos	19–21 Mar 2007	1,009	–	0.5%	1%	3.5%	1.5%	2.5%	25.5%	1%	0.5%	18.5%	30.5%	2%	13%
BVA	19–20 Mar 2007	854	–	0.5%	2%	4%	4%	2%	24%	1%	0.5%	17%	31%	1%	13%
Ipsos	17–20 Mar 2007	1,069	–	0.5%	1.5%	4%	1%	2%	25.5%	1%	0.5%	20.5%	29.5%	1.5%	12.5%

=== 17 November 2006 to 19 March 2007 ===
Polling firm	Fieldwork date	Sample size	Schivardi PT	Laguiller LO	Besancenot LCR	Buffet PCF	Bové SE	Chevènement MRC	Royal PS	Voynet LV	Hulot SE	Lepage Cap21	Nihous CPNT	Bayrou UDF	Sarkozy UMP	Alliot-Marie UMP	Chirac UMP	Dupont-Aignan DLR	Villiers MPF	Le Pen FN
Ifop	19 Mar 2007	872	<0.5%	2%	4%	3%	1.5%	–	24%	1%	–	–	0.5%	21%	28%	–	–	–	1%	14%
Ipsos	16–19 Mar 2007	1,253	0.5%	2%	3.5%	1.5%	2%	–	25%	0.5%	–	–	1%	21.5%	28.5%	–	–	–	2%	12%
Ifop	16–17 Mar 2007	911	<0.5%	3%	3%	2%	2%	–	24%	1.5%	–	–	0.5%	22.5%	26%	–	–	–	1.5%	14%
LH2	16–17 Mar 2007	1,003	<0.5%	1%	2.5%	2%	1.5%	–	26%	1%	–	–	1%	22%	29%	–	–	<0.5%	1.5%	12.5%
Ipsos	15–17 Mar 2007	1,252	0.5%	2%	3.5%	2%	1.5%	–	25%	0.5%	–	–	0.5%	21%	29.5%	–	–	–	1.5%	12.5%
Ipsos	14–16 Mar 2007	1,193	0.5%	2%	3%	2.5%	2%	–	24%	0.5%	–	–	0.5%	22%	29.5%	–	–	–	1%	12.5%
TNS Sofres	14–15 Mar 2007	1,000	<0.5%	2%	2%	2.5%	2%	–	24%	1%	–	–	<0.5%	22%	31%	–	–	1%	0.5%	12%
Ipsos	13–15 Mar 2007	1,008	0.5%	2%	3%	2.5%	2%	–	23%	1%	–	–	0.5%	23%	29%	–	–	0%	0.5%	13%
CSA	14 Mar 2007	905	0.5%	2%	2%	2%	2%	–	26%	1%	–	–	0.5%	21%	27%	–	–	0.5%	1.5%	14%
Ipsos	12–14 Mar 2007	1,005	0%	2%	3%	2.5%	1.5%	–	24%	1%	–	–	0.5%	23%	28.5%	–	–	0%	0.5%	13.5%
BVA	12–13 Mar 2007	861	0.5%	2%	3%	3%	2%	–	23%	1%	–	–	0.5%	21%	29%	–	–	–	2%	13%
Ipsos	10–13 Mar 2007	1,104	0%	2%	3%	2%	1%	–	25%	1%	–	–	0.5%	24%	28%	–	–	0%	0.5%	13%
Ipsos	9–12 Mar 2007	1,250	0%	1.5%	2.5%	2%	1%	–	26%	1%	–	–	0.5%	22%	29.5%	–	–	0%	0.5%	13.5%
LH2	9–10 Mar 2007	1,000	<0.5%	2%	2%	2.5%	1.5%	–	26%	1%	–	<0.5%	<0.5%	22%	28%	–	–	<0.5%	1.5%	13.5%
Ipsos	8–10 Mar 2007	1,254	0%	1.5%	2.5%	2%	1%	–	25.5%	1.5%	–	0%	0.5%	21.5%	31%	–	–	0%	0.5%	12.5%
Ifop	8–9 Mar 2007	881	0.5%	2%	3.5%	2%	1.5%	–	23%	1%	–	0.5%	1%	23%	28%	–	–	<0.5%	1%	13%
Ifop	8–9 Mar 2007	881	0.5%	3%	3.5%	2%	1.5%	–	24%	1%	–	0.5%	1%	25%	34.5%	–	–	<0.5%	3.5%	–
Ipsos	7–9 Mar 2007	1,155	0%	1.5%	2%	2%	1%	–	26%	1%	–	0%	0.5%	20.5%	32.5%	–	–	0%	0.5%	12.5%
TNS Sofres	7–8 Mar 2007	1,000	–	2.5%	4%	1.5%	1.5%	–	25.5%	1%	–	0.5%	<0.5%	23%	27%	–	–	<0.5%	1.5%	12%
TNS Sofres	7–8 Mar 2007	1,000	–	2.5%	4.5%	2%	3%	–	26.5%	1%	–	1%	0.5%	25%	30%	–	–	1%	3%	–
TNS Sofres	7–8 Mar 2007	1,000	–	1.5%	4%	2%	2%	–	25.5%	1.5%	–	<0.5%	0.5%	23%	27%	–	–	<0.5%	1%	12%
Ipsos	6–8 Mar 2007	1,012	0%	1%	2%	2%	1.5%	–	26.5%	0.5%	–	0%	0.5%	20%	33%	–	–	0%	1%	12%
CSA	7 Mar 2007	917	<0.5%	1%	2.5%	1%	3%	–	25%	1%	–	0.5%	0.5%	24%	26%	–	–	0.5%	1%	14%
Ipsos	5–7 Mar 2007	1,012	0%	1%	2%	2%	1.5%	–	27%	0.5%	–	0.5%	0.5%	19%	32.5%	–	–	0%	1%	12.5%
BVA	5–6 Mar 2007	853	–	3%	3%	3%	1%	–	24%	1%	–	0.5%	0.5%	21%	29%	–	–	–	1%	13%
Ipsos	3–6 Mar 2007	1,135	0%	1.5%	2%	2%	1%	–	26.5%	1%	–	0.5%	0.5%	18.5%	32.5%	–	–	0%	1%	13%
Ipsos	2–5 Mar 2007	1,255	0.5%	1.5%	2%	2.5%	1%	–	26%	1%	–	0.5%	0.5%	19%	32%	–	–	0.5%	0.5%	12.5%
LH2	2–3 Mar 2007	1,004	<0.5%	2%	1.5%	2.5%	2%	–	27%	1%	–	<0.5%	0.5%	20%	28%	–	–	0.5%	1%	14%
Ipsos	1–3 Mar 2007	1,254	0.5%	1.5%	2.5%	2.5%	1.5%	–	25%	1%	–	0.5%	0.5%	19%	32%	–	–	0.5%	0.5%	12.5%
Ipsos	28 Feb–2 Mar 2007	1,128	0.5%	2%	3%	2.5%	1.5%	–	25%	1%	–	0.5%	1%	19%	31%	–	–	0.5%	0.5%	12%
TNS Sofres	28 Feb–1 Mar 2007	1,000	–	2%	3%	3.5%	2%	–	25.5%	1%	–	<0.5%	<0.5%	18.5%	31%	–	–	0.5%	1%	12%
Ipsos	27 Feb–1 Mar 2007	1,008	0.5%	2%	3%	2%	1.5%	–	26%	1%	–	0.5%	0.5%	18%	31.5%	–	–	0.5%	0.5%	12.5%
CSA	28 Feb 2007	871	<0.5%	1%	2%	2.5%	2%	–	29%	1%	–	0.5%	0.5%	17%	29%	–	–	0.5%	1%	14%
Ipsos	26–28 Feb 2007	1,009	0.5%	2%	2.5%	2%	1.5%	–	25%	1.5%	–	0.5%	0.5%	18%	32%	–	–	0.5%	1%	12.5%
BVA	26–27 Feb 2007	869	–	2%	5%	3%	1%	–	25%	1%	–	<0.5%	–	17%	31%	–	–	–	1%	14%
Ifop	26 Feb 2007	952	<0.5%	2%	4%	2.5%	2%	–	25.5%	0.5%	–	0.5%	0.5%	19%	29%	–	–	0.5%	2%	12%
Ifop*	23–26 Feb 2007	1,842	<0.5%	2%	3%	3%	2%	–	27%	1%	–	1%	1%	18%	28%	–	–	<0.5%	2%	12%
Ipsos	23–24 Feb 2007	957	0.5%	1%	3%	2%	2%	–	26%	1%	–	0.5%	0.5%	17.5%	31%	–	–	0.5%	1.5%	13%
LH2	23–24 Feb 2007	1,005	<0.5%	2%	3.5%	2.5%	1.5%	–	27%	1%	–	<0.5%	1%	17%	30%	–	–	0.5%	1%	13%
Ifop	22–23 Feb 2007	889	<0.5%	2.5%	3%	2.5%	2%	–	28%	2%	–	0.5%	<0.5%	17%	28%	–	–	1%	2%	11.5%
CSA	20 Feb 2007	884	<0.5%	1%	2.5%	2%	2%	–	29%	1%	–	0.5%	0.5%	17%	28%	–	–	0.5%	2%	14%
BVA	19–20 Feb 2007	845	–	3%	3%	4%	2%	–	26%	1%	–	<0.5%	–	15%	33%	–	–	–	3%	10%
Ipsos	16–17 Feb 2007	952	0.5%	1.5%	4%	2.5%	2%	–	23%	1%	–	0.5%	1%	16%	33%	–	–	0.5%	1.5%	13%
LH2	16–17 Feb 2007	1,007	<0.5%	2%	3.5%	3.5%	2.5%	–	25%	1%	–	<0.5%	<0.5%	14%	33%	–	–	<0.5%	2.5%	13%
CSA	14–15 Feb 2007	909	<0.5%	1%	3%	2%	2%	–	27%	1%	–	0.5%	1%	13%	33%	–	–	0.5%	2%	14%
TNS Sofres	14–15 Feb 2007	1,000	–	2%	3.5%	2.5%	3%	–	26%	1%	–	0.5%	<0.5%	12%	33%	–	–	1%	2.5%	13%
Ifop-Fiducial	13–15 Feb 2007	952	<0.5%	2%	4%	2%	2%	–	25.5%	1.5%	–	1%	<0.5%	16%	32%	–	–	0.5%	2.5%	11%
Ifop-Fiducial	13–15 Feb 2007	952	<0.5%	2%	4.5%	2%	2%	–	25%	1.5%	–	1%	<0.5%	15%	29%	–	4%	<0.5%	3%	11%
BVA	12 Feb 2007	873	–	2%	2%	3%	2%	–	29%	1%	–	<0.5%	–	14%	35%	–	–	–	2%	10%
CSA	12 Feb 2007	919	<0.5%	1%	4%	2%	3%	–	26%	1%	–	0.5%	1%	12%	33%	–	–	0.5%	2%	14%
Ifop	12 Feb 2007	879	0.5%	2.5%	3%	2%	3%	–	26%	2%	–	1%	<0.5%	14%	33.5%	–	–	1%	1.5%	10%
Ipsos	12 Feb 2007	807	–	2%	2.5%	2%	2%	–	27%	1%	–	0.5%	0.5%	14%	34%	–	–	0.5%	1%	13%
Ipsos	9–10 Feb 2007	944	–	2%	3%	3%	2%	–	25%	2%	–	0.5%	1%	13%	36%	–	–	0.5%	1%	11%
LH2	9–10 Feb 2007	1,007	<0.5%	3%	3%	3%	2%	–	27%	2%	–	1%	<0.5%	13%	31%	–	–	0.5%	2.5%	12%
BVA	7–8 Feb 2007	843	–	3%	3%	2%	3%	–	26%	1%	–	<0.5%	–	14%	34%	–	–	–	2%	12%
TNS Sofres	7–8 Feb 2007	1,000	–	3%	3%	2%	3.5%	–	26%	1%	–	0.5%	<0.5%	14%	33%	–	–	<0.5%	1%	13%
Ipsos	2–3 Feb 2007	934	–	1.5%	2.5%	2.5%	2.5%	–	27%	2.5%	–	1%	1%	13%	34%	–	–	0.5%	1%	11%
LH2	2–3 Feb 2007	1,004	<0.5%	3%	3%	3%	2.5%	–	27%	2%	–	0.5%	1%	13%	33%	–	–	<0.5%	3%	9%
TNS Sofres	31 Jan–1 Feb 2007	1,000	–	3%	3.5%	2%	–	–	28%	1.5%	–	0.5%	<0.5%	13%	33%	–	–	0.5%	2%	13%
TNS Sofres	31 Jan–1 Feb 2007	1,000	–	3%	2.5%	2.5%	4%	–	26%	1.5%	–	0.5%	<0.5%	13%	32%	–	–	0.5%	2%	12.5%
CSA	31 Jan 2007	902	0.5%	2%	2%	3%	1%	–	27%	2%	–	1%	1%	12%	31%	–	–	0.5%	1%	16%
CSA	31 Jan 2007	902	0.5%	2%	3%	3%	–	–	26%	3%	–	1%	1%	12%	31%	–	–	0.5%	1%	16%
Ipsos	26–27 Jan 2007	959	–	2.5%	3.5%	3.5%	1%	–	26%	2%	–	1%	1%	11%	35%	–	–	0.5%	2%	11%
LH2	26–27 Jan 2007	1,006	<0.5%	2%	2%	5%	2%	–	29%	2%	–	0.5%	0.5%	14%	31%	–	–	<0.5%	2%	10%
Ifop	25–26 Jan 2007	865	<0.5%	3%	3.5%	3%	3%	–	27.5%	2%	–	1%	0.5%	11%	31%	–	–	0.5%	1%	13%
BVA	22–23 Jan 2007	849	–	4%	7%	3%	–	–	27%	0.5%	–	0.5%	–	13%	33%	–	–	–	2%	10%
BVA	22–23 Jan 2007	849	–	4%	5%	3%	2%	–	27%	0.5%	–	0.5%	–	11%	34%	–	–	–	2%	11%
Ipsos	19–20 Jan 2007	963	–	2%	3.5%	3.5%	–	–	29%	2%	–	–	1%	11%	32%	–	–	–	3%	13%
Ifop-Fiducial	18–20 Jan 2007	956	–	3%	4%	3%	–	–	28%	3%	–	1%	–	12.5%	32.5%	–	–	–	2%	11%
Ifop-Fiducial	18–20 Jan 2007	956	–	3%	4%	3%	–	–	27%	3%	–	1%	–	13%	28%	–	5%	–	2%	11%
TNS Sofres	17–18 Jan 2007	1,000	–	2%	3%	3%	–	–	31%	2%	–	0.5%	<0.5%	9%	35%	–	–	0.5%	1%	13%
CSA	17 Jan 2007	845	0.5%	3%	4%	3%	–	–	29%	2%	–	–	0.5%	9%	30%	–	–	1%	3%	15%
Ifop	15 Jan 2007	868	0.5%	3%	3.5%	3%	–	–	28%	2%	–	1%	1%	12%	33%	–	–	–	3%	10%
Ifop	15 Jan 2007	868	0.5%	3%	3.5%	3%	–	–	28%	2%	–	1%	1%	11%	29%	–	5%	–	2%	11%
TNS Sofres	10–12 Jan 2007	1,000	–	3.5%	4%	2%	–	–	34%	1.5%	–	0.5%	<0.5%	9%	29%	–	–	0.5%	2%	14%
Ipsos	5–6 Jan 2007	952	–	1.5%	3%	3%	–	–	32%	1.5%	–	–	1.5%	10%	33%	–	–	–	2.5%	12%
Ipsos	5–6 Jan 2007	952	–	1.5%	3%	2.5%	–	–	28%	1%	10%	–	0.5%	9%	30%	–	–	–	2.5%	12%
Ifop	4–5 Jan 2007	939	0.5%	3%	3%	3%	–	–	27%	2%	11%	1%	0.5%	10%	25%	–	–	–	2%	12%
CSA	3 Jan 2007	891	–	3%	2%	5%	–	–	34%	1%	–	–	–	6%	32%	–	–	–	2%	15%
Ifop	28–29 Dec 2006	1,006	–	4%	4%	2%	–	–	31%	2%	–	1%	<0.5%	9%	32%	–	–	–	2%	13%
Ifop-Fiducial	14–15 Dec 2006	951	–	3%	3%	3%	–	–	31%	2%	–	1%	–	8%	29%	–	5%	–	4%	11%
CSA	13 Dec 2006	798	–	3%	4%	3%	–	–	31%	2%	–	–	–	8%	30%	–	–	–	3%	16%
BVA	11–12 Dec 2006	797	–	3%	4%	3%	–	–	35%	2%	–	1%	–	8%	32%	–	–	–	3%	9%
BVA	11–12 Dec 2006	797	–	3%	4%	3%	–	–	34%	1.5%	–	0.5%	–	7%	32%	3%	–	–	2%	10%
Ipsos	8–9 Dec 2006	952	–	2%	4%	2%	–	1%	32%	1.5%	–	–	1%	9%	34%	–	–	–	2%	11.5%
TNS Sofres	6–7 Dec 2006	1,000	–	3.5%	3.5%	2%	–	1%	33%	2%	–	0.5%	<0.5%	8%	33%	–	–	–	2%	11.5%
Ipsos	1–2 Dec 2006	950	–	2%	3%	3%	–	1%	31%	1.5%	–	–	0.5%	8%	35%	–	–	–	2.5%	12.5%
Ifop	30 Nov–1 Dec 2006	901	–	2%	4%	3%	–	1%	31%	2%	–	1%	1%	9%	30%	–	–	–	4%	12%
CSA	21–22 Nov 2006	1,002	–	3%	5%	3%	–	1%	32%	2%	–	–	–	6%	29%	–	–	–	2%	17%
CSA	21–22 Nov 2006	1,002	–	4%	5%	3%	–	1%	37%	2%	–	–	–	6%	37%	–	–	–	5%	–
Ifop	17–18 Nov 2006	817	–	3%	5%	4%	–	2%	29%	2%	–	1%	1%	11%	29%	–	–	–	2%	11%
Ifop	17–18 Nov 2006	817	–	3%	5%	4%	–	2%	33%	2%	–	1%	2%	15%	–	–	15%	–	3%	15%

=== 17 July to 16 November 2006 ===
Polling firm	Fieldwork date	Sample size	Laguiller LO	Besancenot LCR	Buffet PCF	Bové SE	Chevènement MRC	Royal PS	Strauss-Kahn PS	Fabius PS	Jospin PS	Lang PS	Hollande PS	Taubira PRG	Voynet LV	Hulot SE	Nihous CPNT	Bayrou UDF	Sarkozy UMP	Villepin UMP	Alliot-Marie UMP	Villiers MPF	Le Pen FN
Ipsos	9–11 Nov 2006	948	3%	4%	3%	–	1.5%	30%	–	–	–	–	–	–	2%	–	0.5%	8%	34%	–	–	4%	10%
Ipsos	9–11 Nov 2006	948	2%	3%	3%	–	1.5%	27%	–	–	–	–	–	–	–	10%	0.5%	7%	32%	–	–	4%	10%
Ipsos	9–11 Nov 2006	948	4%	5%	3%	–	1.5%	31%	–	–	–	–	–	–	2%	–	0.5%	8%	39%	–	–	6%	–
TNS Sofres	8–9 Nov 2006	1,000	2.5%	4%	2%	–	–	34%	–	–	–	–	–	–	1.5%	–	–	7%	34%	–	–	2%	13%
TNS Sofres	8–9 Nov 2006	1,000	4.5%	5.5%	3%	–	–	–	22%	–	–	–	–	–	3%	–	–	9%	37%	–	–	2%	14%
TNS Sofres	8–9 Nov 2006	1,000	4.5%	6%	4%	–	–	–	–	17%	–	–	–	–	3.5%	–	–	11%	38%	–	–	2%	14%
CSA	8 Nov 2006	1,007	3%	4%	4%	–	3%	29%	–	–	–	–	–	–	3%	–	–	7%	30%	–	–	2%	15%
CSA	8 Nov 2006	1,007	5%	4%	4%	–	4%	–	22%	–	–	–	–	–	4%	–	–	6%	32%	–	–	3%	16%
CSA	8 Nov 2006	1,007	5%	6%	4%	–	4%	–	–	16%	–	–	–	–	4%	–	–	8%	34%	–	–	4%	15%
CSA	17–18 Oct 2006	838	4%	4%	3%	–	–	32%	–	–	–	–	–	–	2%	–	–	7%	31%	–	–	2%	15%
CSA	17–18 Oct 2006	838	5%	–	–	6%	–	30%	–	–	–	–	–	–	3%	–	–	7%	32%	–	–	2%	15%
Ifop	12–13 Oct 2006	892	2%	5%	4%	–	–	26%	–	–	–	–	–	–	2%	–	–	12%	32%	–	–	4%	13%
Ifop	12–13 Oct 2006	892	5%	6%	4%	–	–	–	19%	–	–	–	–	–	3%	–	–	12%	34%	–	–	4%	13%
Ifop	12–13 Oct 2006	892	4%	6%	4%	–	–	–	–	14%	–	–	–	–	5%	–	–	15%	35%	–	–	4%	13%
Ifop	12–13 Oct 2006	892	2%	3%	3%	–	2%	26%	–	–	–	–	–	1%	2%	–	2%	10%	29%	–	6%	3%	11%
TNS Sofres	12–13 Oct 2006	1,000	3%	4%	2%	–	–	34%	–	–	–	–	–	–	1%	–	–	7%	36%	–	–	2%	11%
TNS Sofres	12–13 Oct 2006	1,000	3%	5%	2%	–	–	39%	–	–	–	–	–	–	3%	–	–	11%	–	18%	–	5%	14%
TNS Sofres	12–13 Oct 2006	1,000	3.5%	5%	2%	–	–	40%	–	–	–	–	–	–	2.5%	–	–	10%	–	–	17%	5.5%	14.5%
TNS Sofres	12–13 Oct 2006	1,000	3%	4%	2%	–	–	33%	–	–	–	–	–	–	1.5%	–	–	7.5%	30%	5%	–	3%	11%
TNS Sofres	12–13 Oct 2006	1,000	2.5%	4%	2%	–	–	34%	–	–	–	–	–	–	1%	–	–	7%	31%	–	5%	2%	11.5%
Ipsos	6–7 Oct 2006	944	3%	4%	2.5%	2%	–	28%	–	–	–	–	–	–	2%	–	0.5%	8%	34%	–	–	4%	12%
Ipsos	6–7 Oct 2006	944	3%	5%	2.5%	2.5%	–	34%	–	–	–	–	–	–	2%	–	2%	12%	–	14%	–	7%	16%
TNS Sofres	4–5 Oct 2006	1,000	3%	5%	3%	–	–	29.5%	–	–	–	–	–	–	2%	–	–	7%	38%	–	–	3%	9.5%
TNS Sofres	4–5 Oct 2006	1,000	5%	7.5%	4%	–	–	–	20%	–	–	–	–	–	3.5%	–	–	8%	39%	–	–	3%	10%
TNS Sofres	4–5 Oct 2006	1,000	5%	9.5%	4%	–	–	–	–	15%	–	–	–	–	3.5%	–	–	9.5%	39%	–	–	3.5%	11%
CSA	13–14 Sep 2006	907	4%	5%	3%	–	–	31%	–	–	–	–	–	–	3%	–	–	6%	30%	–	–	3%	15%
Ipsos	8–9 Sep 2006	954	4%	4%	3%	2%	–	27%	–	–	–	–	–	–	2%	–	1%	6%	36%	–	–	4%	11%
Ipsos	8–9 Sep 2006	954	4%	5%	3%	2%	–	34%	–	–	–	–	–	–	3%	–	1%	11%	–	15%	–	8%	14%
TNS Sofres	4–5 Sep 2006	1,000	3%	3.5%	3%	–	–	34%	–	–	–	–	–	–	1.5%	–	–	7%	36%	–	–	2%	10%
TNS Sofres	4–5 Sep 2006	1,000	4%	5.5%	4.5%	–	–	–	20%	–	–	–	–	–	4%	–	–	10%	38%	–	–	3%	11%
TNS Sofres	4–5 Sep 2006	1,000	5%	7%	5%	–	–	–	–	13%	–	–	–	–	5.5%	–	–	11%	40%	–	–	2%	11.5%
TNS Sofres	4–5 Sep 2006	1,000	4%	5.5%	4%	–	–	–	–	–	23%	–	–	–	4%	–	–	9%	37%	–	–	2%	11.5%
TNS Sofres	4–5 Sep 2006	1,000	4.5%	5.5%	4%	–	–	–	–	–	–	23%	–	–	3.5%	–	–	9%	37%	–	–	2.5%	11%
TNS Sofres	4–5 Sep 2006	1,000	5%	6.5%	4%	–	–	–	–	–	–	–	20%	–	3.5%	–	–	9.5%	38%	–	–	2%	11.5%
Ipsos	18–19 Aug 2006	963	4%	5%	2%	3%	–	28%	–	–	–	–	–	–	2%	–	–	6%	37%	–	–	2%	11%
Ipsos	18–19 Aug 2006	963	4%	6%	2%	3%	–	37%	–	–	–	–	–	–	2%	–	–	11%	–	13%	–	6%	16%
TNS Sofres	17 Jul 2006	1,000	4%	4%	3%	–	–	32%	–	–	–	–	–	–	1.5%	–	–	6%	35%	–	–	3%	11.5%
TNS Sofres	17 Jul 2006	1,000	4.5%	5.5%	4%	–	–	–	–	–	21.5%	–	–	–	3%	–	–	8%	38%	–	–	3.5%	12%
TNS Sofres	17 Jul 2006	1,000	5.5%	6.5%	4%	–	–	–	–	–	–	–	19%	–	3.5%	–	–	8%	38.5%	–	–	4%	11%

=== 16 May to 16 July 2006 ===
Polling firm	Fieldwork date	Sample size	Laguiller LO	Besancenot LCR	Buffet PCF	Autain PCF	Braouezec PCF	Bové SE	Royal PS	Strauss-Kahn PS	Fabius PS	Jospin PS	Lang PS	Hollande PS	Mélenchon PS	Taubira PRG	Voynet LV	Bayrou UDF	Sarkozy UMP	Villepin UMP	Chirac UMP	Villiers MPF	Le Pen FN
Ifop	29–30 Jun 2006	800	2%	6%	3%	–	–	–	30%	–	–	–	–	–	–	–	3%	8%	32%	–	–	3%	13%
Ifop	29–30 Jun 2006	800	4%	7%	3%	–	–	–	–	–	–	20%	–	–	–	–	5%	9%	34%	–	–	5%	13%
Ifop	29–30 Jun 2006	800	2%	6%	3%	–	–	–	29%	–	–	–	–	–	–	–	3%	6%	28%	–	8%	3%	12%
TNS Sofres	14–15 Jun 2006	1,000	3.5%	6%	2%	–	–	–	32%	–	–	–	–	–	–	–	2%	8%	31%	–	–	3%	12.5%
TNS Sofres	14–15 Jun 2006	1,000	4.5%	7%	2.5%	–	–	–	–	21%	–	–	–	–	–	–	3%	9%	35%	–	–	4.5%	13.5%
TNS Sofres	14–15 Jun 2006	1,000	4.5%	8%	3%	–	–	–	–	–	17%	–	–	–	–	–	4%	11%	35%	–	–	4%	13.5%
TNS Sofres	14–15 Jun 2006	1,000	4.5%	6%	3%	–	–	–	–	–	–	23%	–	–	–	–	3%	10%	34%	–	–	4%	12.5%
TNS Sofres	14–15 Jun 2006	1,000	4%	6%	2.5%	–	–	–	–	–	–	–	23.5%	–	–	–	3%	9.5%	34%	–	–	4%	13.5%
TNS Sofres	14–15 Jun 2006	1,000	4.5%	6%	3%	–	–	–	–	–	–	–	–	22%	–	–	3%	10.5%	34%	–	–	4%	13%
TNS Sofres	14–15 Jun 2006	1,000	3%	5%	2%	–	–	–	32%	–	–	–	–	–	–	–	2%	6%	31%	4%	–	2%	13%
Ipsos	9–10 Jun 2006	959	3%	6%	4%	–	–	–	29%	–	–	–	–	–	–	–	2%	5%	35%	–	–	4%	12%
Ipsos	9–10 Jun 2006	959	3%	7%	4%	–	–	–	37%	–	–	–	–	–	–	–	2%	10%	–	12%	–	8%	17%
CSA	7 Jun 2006	844	3%	6%	3%	–	–	–	30%	–	–	–	–	–	–	–	3%	5%	32%	–	–	3%	15%
TNS Sofres	17–18 May 2006	1,000	3.5%	5%	3%	–	–	–	30%	–	–	–	–	–	–	–	2.5%	8%	34%	–	–	4%	10%
TNS Sofres	17–18 May 2006	1,000	5%	6.5%	4.5%	–	–	–	–	–	–	–	–	21%	–	–	4%	9%	35%	–	–	4%	11%
TNS Sofres	17–18 May 2006	1,000	3.5%	4.5%	3%	–	–	–	31%	–	–	–	–	–	–	–	2%	6%	32%	5%	–	3%	10%
TNS Sofres	17–18 May 2006	1,000	3.5%	6.5%	4%	–	–	–	–	–	–	–	–	21%	–	–	3%	8%	34%	6%	–	4%	10%
CSA	16–17 May 2006	777	4%	5%	3%	–	–	–	33%	–	–	–	–	–	–	–	2%	5%	32%	–	–	3%	13%
CSA	16–17 May 2006	777	5%	7%	–	–	–	–	28%	–	–	–	–	–	–	–	3%	8%	31%	–	–	5%	13%
CSA	16–17 May 2006	777	6%	–	5%	–	–	–	30%	–	–	–	–	–	–	–	3%	8%	31%	–	–	4%	13%
CSA	16–17 May 2006	777	9%	–	–	2%	–	–	31%	–	–	–	–	–	–	–	2%	9%	31%	–	–	3%	13%
CSA	16–17 May 2006	777	7%	–	–	–	2%	–	31%	–	–	–	–	–	–	–	2%	8%	32%	–	–	4%	14%
CSA	16–17 May 2006	777	6%	–	–	–	–	9%	29%	–	–	–	–	–	–	–	1%	7%	31%	–	–	3%	14%
CSA	16–17 May 2006	777	8%	–	–	–	–	–	29%	–	–	–	–	–	4%	–	2%	7%	32%	–	–	4%	14%
CSA	16–17 May 2006	777	6%	–	–	–	–	–	31%	–	–	–	–	–	–	3%	2%	7%	33%	–	–	4%	14%

=== 12 February 2005 to 15 May 2006 ===
Polling firm	Fieldwork date	Sample size	Laguiller LO	Besancenot LCR	Buffet PCF	Bové SE	Royal PS	Strauss-Kahn PS	Fabius PS	Jospin PS	Lang PS	Hollande PS	Mamère LV	Voynet LV	Bayrou UDF	Sarkozy UMP	Villepin UMP	Chirac UMP	Villiers MPF	Le Pen FN
Ipsos	12–13 May 2006	939	3%	5%	4%	–	30%	–	–	–	–	–	–	2%	6%	35%	–	–	5%	10%
Ipsos	12–13 May 2006	939	3%	6%	4%	–	34%	–	–	–	–	–	–	3%	11%	–	15%	–	10%	14%
Ifop	20–21 Apr 2006	883	3%	5%	4%	–	30%	–	–	–	–	–	–	2%	8%	32%	–	–	4%	12%
Ifop	20–21 Apr 2006	883	5%	8%	5%	–	–	19%	–	–	–	–	–	4%	8%	34%	–	–	4%	13%
Ifop	20–21 Apr 2006	883	5%	8%	5%	–	–	–	14%	–	–	–	–	5%	10%	35%	–	–	4%	14%
Ifop	20–21 Apr 2006	883	4%	7%	5%	–	–	–	–	21%	–	–	–	4%	8%	33%	–	–	4%	14%
Ifop	20–21 Apr 2006	883	4%	7%	4%	–	–	–	–	–	21%	–	–	4%	8%	35%	–	–	4%	13%
Ifop	20–21 Apr 2006	883	5%	7%	4%	–	–	–	–	–	–	19%	–	4%	9%	35%	–	–	4%	13%
Ifop	20–21 Apr 2006	883	3%	5%	4%	–	30%	–	–	–	–	–	–	2%	6%	29%	6%	–	4%	11%
CSA	18–19 Apr 2006	878	5%	5%	3%	–	31%	–	–	–	–	–	–	2%	5%	31%	–	–	4%	14%
TNS Sofres	18 Apr 2006	1,000	3%	4.5%	3%	–	34%	–	–	–	–	–	–	1.5%	5%	30%	6%	–	3%	10%
TNS Sofres	18 Apr 2006	1,000	5%	7.5%	4.5%	–	–	18%	–	–	–	–	–	3%	7%	34%	7%	–	4%	10%
TNS Sofres	18 Apr 2006	1,000	5%	8%	5%	–	–	–	15%	–	–	–	–	4%	8%	33%	7%	–	5%	10%
TNS Sofres	18 Apr 2006	1,000	4%	6%	4%	–	–	–	–	23%	–	–	–	3%	7%	33%	7%	–	4%	9%
TNS Sofres	18 Apr 2006	1,000	4.5%	7%	4%	–	–	–	–	–	22%	–	–	2.5%	7%	33%	6%	–	4%	10%
Ipsos	7–8 Apr 2006	947	4%	6%	3%	–	28%	–	–	–	–	–	–	3%	7%	33%	–	–	6%	10%
Ipsos	7–8 Apr 2006	947	4%	6%	3%	–	32%	–	–	–	–	–	–	3%	11%	–	20%	–	8%	13%
CSA	29 Mar 2006	839	5%	6%	4%	–	27%	–	–	–	–	–	–	1%	8%	34%	–	–	3%	12%
CSA	29 Mar 2006	839	5%	6%	4%	–	26%	–	–	–	–	–	–	1%	6%	34%	4%	–	2%	12%
Ipsos	10–11 Mar 2006	945	3%	5%	3%	–	28%	–	–	–	–	–	–	2%	7%	36%	–	–	7%	9%
Ipsos	10–11 Mar 2006	945	3%	5%	3%	–	32%	–	–	–	–	–	–	2%	9%	–	25%	–	8%	13%
Ipsos	10–11 Feb 2006	930	4%	6%	3%	–	27%	–	–	–	–	–	–	3%	7%	35%	–	–	6%	9%
Ipsos	10–11 Feb 2006	930	4%	6%	3%	–	30%	–	–	–	–	–	–	3%	8%	–	27%	–	7%	12%
BVA	27–28 Jan 2006	951	4%	6%	3%	–	25%	–	–	–	–	–	–	2%	7%	29%	10%	–	4%	10%
BVA	27–28 Jan 2006	951	6%	5%	3%	–	–	–	–	22%	–	–	–	3%	7%	30%	11%	–	4%	9%
BVA	27–28 Jan 2006	951	6%	–	–	8%	26%	–	–	–	–	–	–	–	8%	27%	11%	–	5%	9%
BVA	27–28 Jan 2006	951	6%	–	–	9%	–	–	–	22%	–	–	–	–	9%	29%	11%	–	5%	9%
CSA	25–26 Jan 2006	865	4%	6%	4%	–	28%	–	–	–	–	–	–	2%	9%	31%	–	–	7%	9%
CSA	25–26 Jan 2006	865	4%	6%	4%	–	27%	–	–	–	–	–	–	2%	5%	26%	12%	–	5%	9%
BVA	30 Sep–1 Oct 2005	811	4%	7%	3%	–	22%	–	–	–	–	–	4%	–	7%	29%	12%	–	5%	7%
BVA	30 Sep–1 Oct 2005	811	4%	9%	4%	–	–	19%	–	–	–	–	5%	–	7%	28%	12%	–	4%	8%
BVA	30 Sep–1 Oct 2005	811	3%	7%	4%	–	–	–	16%	–	–	–	8%	–	9%	30%	12%	–	3%	8%
BVA	27–29 Jun 2005	860	3%	6%	4%	–	–	–	17%	–	–	–	7%	–	8%	31%	–	9%	4%	11%
BVA	27–29 Jun 2005	860	2%	6%	4%	–	–	–	–	25%	–	–	4%	–	8%	29%	–	9%	3%	10%
BVA	27–29 Jun 2005	860	4%	8%	5%	–	–	–	19%	–	–	–	7%	–	11%	39%	–	–	7%	–
BVA	27–29 Jun 2005	860	3%	8%	5%	–	–	–	–	28%	–	–	4%	–	9%	36%	–	–	7%	–
BVA	12–13 Feb 2005	953	3%	4%	4%	–	–	–	–	25%	–	–	4%	–	10%	34%	–	–	6%	10%
BVA	12–13 Feb 2005	953	4%	4%	5%	–	–	–	–	–	–	24%	6%	–	9%	33%	–	–	5%	10%
BVA	12–13 Feb 2005	953	3%	4%	4%	–	–	–	–	27%	–	–	4%	–	12%	–	–	28%	7%	11%
BVA	12–13 Feb 2005	953	4%	4%	4%	–	–	–	–	–	–	26%	5%	–	11%	–	–	29%	5%	12%
BVA	12–13 Feb 2005	953	3%	3%	4%	–	–	–	–	26%	–	–	4%	–	7%	24%	–	16%	4%	9%
BVA	12–13 Feb 2005	953	4%	4%	4%	–	–	–	–	–	–	23%	5%	–	7%	24%	–	16%	4%	9%

=== By region ===
Nord-Pas-de-Calais

Polling firm	Fieldwork date	Sample size	Abs.	Schivardi PT	Laguiller LO	Besancenot LCR	Buffet PCF	Bové SE	Royal PS	Voynet LV	Nihous CPNT	Bayrou UDF	Sarkozy UMP	Villiers MPF	Le Pen FN
2007 election	22 Apr 2007	–	18.51%	0.28%	2.30%	5.58%	3.23%	1.07%	25.02%	1.37%	1.90%	14.88%	27.92%	1.78%	14.67%
BVA	16–17 Apr 2007	805	–	1%	3%	6%	5%	1%	26%	1%	2%	11%	27%	1%	16%
BVA	19–20 Mar 2007	804	–	<0.5%	3%	4%	4%	2%	28%	1%	1%	16%	27%	1%	13%
BVA	21 Feb 2007	805	–	–	3%	3%	4%	1%	30%	1%	<0.5%	18%	25%	1%	14%
BVA	16–17 Feb 2007	805	–	–	5%	4%	4%	1%	28%	1%	<0.5%	14%	26%	1%	16%

Provence-Alpes-Côte-d'Azur

Polling firm	Fieldwork date	Sample size	Abs.	Schivardi PT	Laguiller LO	Besancenot LCR	Buffet PCF	Bové SE	Royal PS	Voynet LV	Nihous CPNT	Bayrou UDF	Sarkozy UMP	Villiers MPF	Le Pen FN
2007 election	22 Apr 2007	–	16.10%	0.36%	0.97%	3.24%	2.27%	1.35%	21.21%	1.40%	0.97%	15.36%	37.01%	2.01%	13.84%
CSA	2–7 Jan 2007	1,000	–	–	3%	2%	4%	–	25%	2%	–	6%	36%	3%	19%

Provence-Alpes-Côte-d'Azur and Languedoc-Roussillon

Polling firm	Fieldwork date	Sample size	Abs.	Schivardi PT	Laguiller LO	Besancenot LCR	Buffet PCF	Bové SE	Royal PS	Voynet LV	Nihous CPNT	Bayrou UDF	Chirac UMP	Sarkozy UMP	Villiers MPF	Le Pen FN
2007 election	22 Apr 2007	–	15.36%	0.50%	1.02%	3.53%	2.35%	1.51%	22.81%	1.38%	1.12%	15.31%	–	34.65%	1.94%	13.87%
BVA	11–14 Dec 2006	810	–	–	3%	4%	3%	–	29%	1%	–	7%	4%	32%	4%	13%

Corsica

Polling firm	Fieldwork date	Sample size	Abs.	Schivardi PT	Laguiller LO	Besancenot LCR	Buffet PCF	Bové SE	Royal PS	Voynet LV	Nihous CPNT	Bayrou UDF	Sarkozy UMP	Villiers MPF	Le Pen FN
2007 election	22 Apr 2007	–	24.50%	0.29%	0.88%	3.87%	3.36%	1.08%	21.81%	1.38%	1.47%	12.36%	37.00%	1.24%	15.26%
Ifop	20–21 Mar 2007	504	–	0.5%	2%	2.5%	2%	3%	20.5%	0.5%	3%	16%	34%	1%	15%

La Réunion

Polling firm	Fieldwork date	Sample size	Abs.	Schivardi PT	Laguiller LO	Besancenot LCR	Buffet PCF	Bové SE	Royal PS	Voynet LV	Lepage Cap21	Nihous CPNT	Bayrou UDF	Sarkozy UMP	Dupont-Aignan DLR	Villiers MPF	Le Pen FN
2007 election	22 Apr 2007	–	27.39%	0.19%	1.20%	2.63%	2.97%	1.35%	46.22%	1.29%	–	0.30%	13.29%	25.09%	–	0.59%	4.88%
Ipsos	6–9 Mar 2007	786	–	–	1%	2%	1.5%	1.5%	44%	1%	0.5%	0%	10%	34%	0%	0.5%	4%
Ipsos	29 Nov–9 Dec 2006	447	–	–	0.5%	2%	1%	–	57%	4%	0%	0%	5%	24%	0%	0.5%	5%

=== By department ===
Alpes-de-Haute-Provence, Hautes-Alpes, and Vaucluse

Polling firm	Fieldwork date	Sample size	Abs.	Schivardi PT	Laguiller LO	Besancenot LCR	Buffet PCF	Bové SE	Royal PS	Voynet LV	Nihous CPNT	Bayrou UDF	Sarkozy UMP	Villiers MPF	Le Pen FN
2007 election	22 Apr 2007	–	14.35%	0.46%	1.02%	3.79%	1.98%	1.91%	22.75%	1.55%	1.56%	16.45%	31.75%	2.64%	14.14%
CSA	2–7 Jan 2007	–	–	–	3%	2%	4%	–	26%	2%	–	5%	34%	3%	21%

Alpes-Maritimes, Bouches-du-Rhône, and Var

Polling firm	Fieldwork date	Sample size	Abs.	Schivardi PT	Laguiller LO	Besancenot LCR	Buffet PCF	Bové SE	Royal PS	Voynet LV	Nihous CPNT	Bayrou UDF	Sarkozy UMP	Villiers MPF	Le Pen FN
2007 election	22 Apr 2007	–	16.48%	0.34%	0.96%	3.11%	2.33%	1.23%	20.87%	1.37%	0.84%	15.11%	38.19%	1.87%	13.77%
CSA	2–7 Jan 2007	–	–	–	3%	2%	4%	–	24%	2%	–	8%	34%	3%	19%

=== By commune ===
Aix-en-Provence

Polling firm	Fieldwork date	Sample size	Abs.	Schivardi PT	Laguiller LO	Besancenot LCR	Buffet PCF	Bové SE	Royal PS	Voynet LV	Nihous CPNT	Bayrou UDF	Sarkozy UMP	Villiers MPF	Le Pen FN
2007 election	22 Apr 2007	–	17.25%	0.23%	0.74%	2.59%	1.21%	1.35%	25.36%	1.64%	0.40%	19.78%	36.78%	1.46%	8.47%
CSA	2–7 Jan 2007	513	–	–	1%	2%	4%	–	33%	3%	–	9%	32%	2%	14%

Avignon

Polling firm	Fieldwork date	Sample size	Abs.	Schivardi PT	Laguiller LO	Besancenot LCR	Buffet PCF	Bové SE	Royal PS	Voynet LV	Nihous CPNT	Bayrou UDF	Sarkozy UMP	Villiers MPF	Le Pen FN
2007 election	22 Apr 2007	–	16.75%	0.37%	0.88%	3.58%	1.91%	1.79%	28.68%	1.39%	0.42%	15.65%	30.44%	1.89%	13.00%
CSA	2–7 Jan 2007	501	–	–	5%	2%	5%	–	28%	2%	–	8%	27%	3%	20%

Marseille

Polling firm	Fieldwork date	Sample size	Abs.	Schivardi PT	Laguiller LO	Besancenot LCR	Buffet PCF	Bové SE	Royal PS	Voynet LV	Nihous CPNT	Bayrou UDF	Sarkozy UMP	Villiers MPF	Le Pen FN
2007 election	22 Apr 2007	–	17.45%	0.32%	0.98%	3.13%	2.56%	1.23%	27.11%	1.16%	0.38%	14.10%	34.25%	1.35%	13.43%
CSA	2–7 Jan 2007	503	–	–	2%	2%	5%	–	30%	3%	–	4%	36%	1%	17%

Nice

Polling firm	Fieldwork date	Sample size	Abs.	Schivardi PT	Laguiller LO	Besancenot LCR	Buffet PCF	Bové SE	Royal PS	Voynet LV	Nihous CPNT	Bayrou UDF	Sarkozy UMP	Villiers MPF	Le Pen FN
2007 election	22 Apr 2007	–	18.19%	0.19%	0.70%	2.34%	1.89%	0.98%	20.42%	1.27%	0.25%	14.57%	41.83%	1.82%	13.74%
CSA	2–7 Jan 2007	501	–	–	3%	1%	6%	–	23%	3%	–	8%	33%	2%	21%

Toulon

Polling firm	Fieldwork date	Sample size	Abs.	Schivardi PT	Laguiller LO	Besancenot LCR	Buffet PCF	Bové SE	Royal PS	Voynet LV	Nihous CPNT	Bayrou UDF	Sarkozy UMP	Villiers MPF	Le Pen FN
2007 election	22 Apr 2007	–	19.26%	0.34%	1.10%	3.35%	1.82%	1.01%	20.88%	1.33%	0.56%	15.63%	38.24%	2.20%	13.53%
CSA	2–7 Jan 2007	502	–	–	3%	2%	5%	–	34%	1%	–	6%	32%	2%	15%

== Second round ==
During the 2007 presidential election, Ipsos launched the first ever rolling poll in France, described as a "continuous electoral barometer", publishing results every day of the week except Sunday for ten weeks starting on 1 March 2007. The Ifop poll conducted from 23 to 26 February 2007, marked with an asterisk (*) below, was conducted specifically for subsample data.

The publication of second-round polls was prohibited after midnight on 4 May 2007.

=== Graphical summary ===
The averages in the graphs below were constructed using polls listed below conducted by the six major French pollsters. The graphs are 14-day weighted moving averages, using only the most recent poll conducted by any given pollster within that range (each poll weighted based on recency).

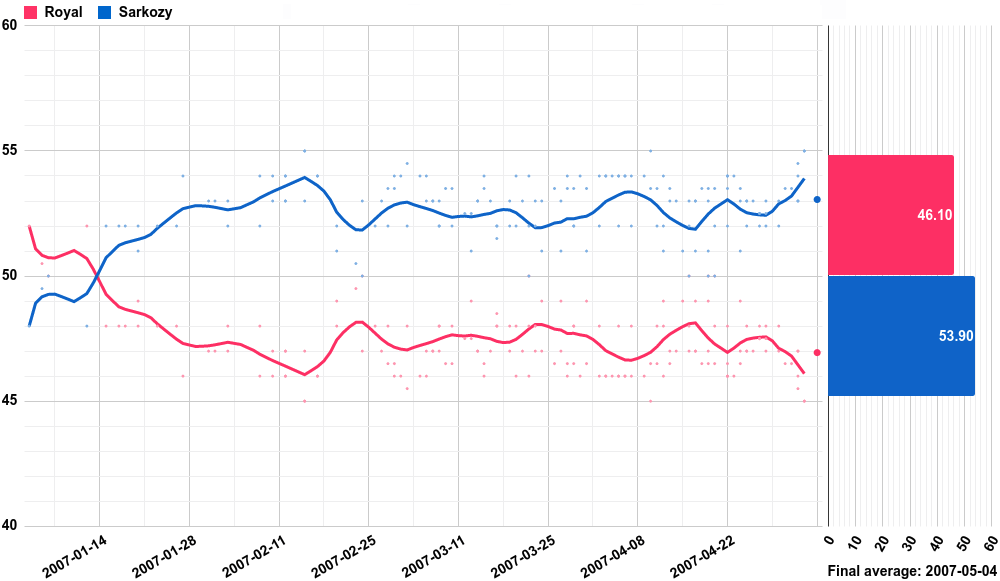

=== Royal–Sarkozy ===
Polling firm	Fieldwork date	Sample size	Abs.	Royal PS	Sarkozy UMP
2007 election	6 May 2007	–	16.03%	46.94%	53.06%
BVA	4 May 2007	807	–	45%	55%
Ipsos	4 May 2007	992	–	45%	55%
CSA	3 May 2007	1,005	–	47%	53%
Ifop-Fiducial	3 May 2007	961	–	47%	53%
TNS Sofres	3 May 2007	1,000	–	45.5%	54.5%
Ipsos	2–3 May 2007	1,414	–	46%	54%
OpinionWay	2–3 May 2007	1,415	–	46%	54%
Ipsos	1–2 May 2007	1,011	–	46.5%	53.5%
Ipsos	30 Apr–1 May 2007	808	–	46.5%	53.5%
BVA	30 Apr 2007	805	–	48%	52%
Ipsos	27–30 Apr 2007	1,362	–	47%	53%
Ifop	27–28 Apr 2007	956	–	47%	53%
LH2	27–28 Apr 2007	1,002	–	48%	52%
Ipsos	26–28 Apr 2007	1,367	–	47.5%	52.5%
Ifop-Fiducial	26–27 Apr 2007	886	19%	47.5%	52.5%
TNS Sofres	26–27 Apr 2007	2,000	–	48%	52%
Ipsos	25–27 Apr 2007	1,255	–	47.5%	52.5%
Ipsos	24–26 Apr 2007	1,219	–	47%	53%
CSA	25 Apr 2007	1,005	–	48%	52%
Ifop-Fiducial	24–25 Apr 2007	956	–	47%	53%
Ipsos	23–25 Apr 2007	1,613	–	47%	53%
BVA	24 Apr 2007	893	–	47%	53%
Ipsos	23–24 Apr 2007	1,208	–	46.5%	53.5%
TNS Sofres	23–24 Apr 2007	1,000	–	49%	51%
Ipsos	23 Apr 2007	803	–	46%	54%
BVA	22 Apr 2007	825	–	48%	52%
CSA	22 Apr 2007	1,005	–	46.5%	53.5%
Ifop-Fiducial	22 Apr 2007	1,010	–	46%	54%
Ipsos	22 Apr 2007	1,089	–	46%	54%
LH2	22 Apr 2007	1,537	–	46%	54%
BVA	20 Apr 2007	810	–	48%	52%
CSA	20 Apr 2007	1,002	–	50%	50%
Ipsos	19–20 Apr 2007	1,598	–	46.5%	53.5%
CSA	18–19 Apr 2007	1,002	–	50%	50%
Ipsos	18–19 Apr 2007	1,209	–	46.5%	53.5%
TNS Sofres	18–19 Apr 2007	1,000	–	47%	53%
Ifop-Fiducial	17–19 Apr 2007	952	–	49%	51%
Ipsos	17–18 Apr 2007	1,212	–	46.5%	53.5%
BVA	16–17 Apr 2007	887	–	47%	53%
Ipsos	16–17 Apr 2007	1,009	–	47%	53%
TNS Sofres	16–17 Apr 2007	1,000	–	49%	51%
CSA	16 Apr 2007	1,006	–	50%	50%
Ifop	14–16 Apr 2007	954	–	47%	53%
Ipsos	14–16 Apr 2007	1,357	–	48%	52%
LH2	13–15 Apr 2007	1,004	–	49%	51%
Ipsos	12–14 Apr 2007	1,355	–	47%	53%
Ifop	12–13 Apr 2007	928	–	47%	53%
Ipsos	11–13 Apr 2007	1,279	–	46.5%	53.5%
CSA	11–12 Apr 2007	918	–	49%	51%
TNS Sofres	11–12 Apr 2007	1,000	–	48%	52%
Ipsos	10–12 Apr 2007	1,207	–	46%	54%
CSA	10–11 Apr 2007	876	–	48%	52%
Ipsos	9–11 Apr 2007	1,209	–	46.5%	53.5%
BVA	10 Apr 2007	867	–	45%	55%
Ipsos	7–10 Apr 2007	1,300	–	46.5%	53.5%
Ipsos	6–9 Apr 2007	1,355	–	46%	54%
LH2	6–7 Apr 2007	1,009	–	48%	52%
Ipsos	5–7 Apr 2007	1,355	–	46%	54%
Ifop	5–6 Apr 2007	953	–	46%	54%
Ipsos	4–6 Apr 2007	1,263	–	46%	54%
CSA	4–5 Apr 2007	881	–	48%	52%
TNS Sofres	4–5 Apr 2007	1,000	–	46%	54%
Ipsos	3–5 Apr 2007	1,208	–	46%	54%
Ipsos	2–4 Apr 2007	1,209	–	46%	54%
BVA	2–3 Apr 2007	860	–	46%	54%
Ipsos	31 Mar–3 Apr 2007	1,272	–	46%	54%
Ifop	31 Mar–2 Apr 2007	846	–	48%	52%
Ipsos	30 Mar–2 Apr 2007	1,344	–	46%	54%
LH2	30–31 Mar 2007	1,003	–	49%	51%
Ipsos	29–31 Mar 2007	1,341	–	46.5%	53.5%
Ipsos	28–30 Mar 2007	1,277	–	46%	54%
CSA	28–29 Mar 2007	922	–	48%	52%
TNS Sofres	28–29 Mar 2007	1,000	–	48%	52%
Ipsos	27–29 Mar 2007	1,104	–	46.5%	53.5%
Ifop-Fiducial	26–28 Mar 2007	954	–	46%	54%
Ipsos	26–28 Mar 2007	1,006	–	46.5%	53.5%
BVA	26–27 Mar 2007	873	–	49%	51%
Ipsos	24–27 Mar 2007	1,110	–	47%	53%
Ipsos	23–26 Mar 2007	1,247	–	46.5%	53.5%
LH2	23–24 Mar 2007	1,004	–	49%	51%
Ipsos	22–24 Mar 2007	1,245	–	47%	53%
Ifop	22–23 Mar 2007	872	–	48%	52%
Ipsos	21–23 Mar 2007	1,143	–	47%	53%
CSA	21–22 Mar 2007	894	–	50%	50%
TNS Sofres	21–22 Mar 2007	1,000	–	48%	52%
Ipsos	20–22 Mar 2007	1,006	–	46%	54%
Ipsos	19–21 Mar 2007	1,009	–	47%	53%
BVA	19–20 Mar 2007	854	–	46%	54%
Ipsos	17–20 Mar 2007	1,069	–	48%	52%
Ifop	19 Mar 2007	872	–	47%	53%
Ipsos	16–19 Mar 2007	1,253	–	48%	52%
Ifop	16–17 Mar 2007	911	–	48.5%	51.5%
LH2	16–17 Mar 2007	1,003	–	48%	52%
Ipsos	15–17 Mar 2007	1,252	–	48%	52%
Ipsos	14–16 Mar 2007	1,193	–	47%	53%
TNS Sofres	14–15 Mar 2007	1,000	–	46%	54%
Ipsos	13–15 Mar 2007	1,008	–	46.5%	53.5%
CSA	14 Mar 2007	905	–	47%	53%
Ipsos	12–14 Mar 2007	1,005	–	47%	53%
BVA	12–13 Mar 2007	861	–	49%	51%
Ipsos	10–13 Mar 2007	1,104	–	47.5%	52.5%
Ipsos	9–12 Mar 2007	1,250	–	47.5%	52.5%
LH2	9–10 Mar 2007	1,000	–	48%	52%
Ipsos	8–10 Mar 2007	1,254	–	46.5%	53.5%
Ipsos	7–9 Mar 2007	1,155	–	46.5%	53.5%
TNS Sofres	7–8 Mar 2007	1,000	–	48%	52%
TNS Sofres	7–8 Mar 2007	1,000	–	48%	52%
Ipsos	6–8 Mar 2007	1,012	–	47%	53%
CSA	7 Mar 2007	917	–	47%	53%
Ipsos	5–7 Mar 2007	1,012	–	47%	53%
BVA	5–6 Mar 2007	853	–	47%	53%
Ipsos	3–6 Mar 2007	1,135	–	46%	54%
Ipsos	2–5 Mar 2007	1,255	–	46%	54%
LH2	2–3 Mar 2007	1,004	–	48%	52%
Ipsos	1–3 Mar 2007	1,254	–	45.5%	54.5%
Ipsos	28 Feb–2 Mar 2007	1,128	–	46%	54%
TNS Sofres	28 Feb–1 Mar 2007	1,000	–	46%	54%
Ipsos	27 Feb–1 Mar 2007	1,008	–	46.5%	53.5%
CSA	28 Feb 2007	871	–	48%	52%
Ipsos	26–28 Feb 2007	1,009	–	46.5%	53.5%
BVA	26–27 Feb 2007	869	–	47%	53%
Ifop	26 Feb 2007	952	–	48%	52%
Ifop*	23–26 Feb 2007	1,842	–	49%	51%
Ipsos	23–24 Feb 2007	957	–	47%	53%
LH2	23–24 Feb 2007	1,005	–	50%	50%
Ifop	22–23 Feb 2007	889	–	49.5%	50.5%
CSA	20 Feb 2007	884	–	49%	51%
BVA	19–20 Feb 2007	845	–	48%	52%
Ipsos	16–17 Feb 2007	952	–	46%	54%
LH2	16–17 Feb 2007	1,007	–	46%	54%
CSA	14–15 Feb 2007	909	–	45%	55%
TNS Sofres	14–15 Feb 2007	1,000	–	45%	55%
Ifop-Fiducial	13–15 Feb 2007	952	–	47%	53%
BVA	12 Feb 2007	873	–	47%	53%
CSA	12 Feb 2007	919	–	46%	54%
Ifop	12 Feb 2007	879	–	46%	54%
Ipsos	12 Feb 2007	807	–	47%	53%
Ipsos	9–10 Feb 2007	944	–	46%	54%
LH2	9–10 Feb 2007	1,007	–	47%	53%
BVA	7–8 Feb 2007	843	–	48%	52%
TNS Sofres	7–8 Feb 2007	1,000	–	46%	54%
Ipsos	2–3 Feb 2007	934	–	47%	53%
LH2	2–3 Feb 2007	1,004	–	48%	52%
TNS Sofres	31 Jan–1 Feb 2007	1,000	–	47%	53%
CSA	31 Jan 2007	902	–	47%	53%
Ipsos	26–27 Jan 2007	959	–	46%	54%
Ifop	25–26 Jan 2007	865	–	48%	52%
BVA	22–23 Jan 2007	849	–	48%	52%
Ipsos	19–20 Jan 2007	963	–	48%	52%
Ifop-Fiducial	18–20 Jan 2007	956	–	49%	51%
TNS Sofres	17–18 Jan 2007	1,000	–	48%	52%
CSA	17 Jan 2007	845	–	48%	52%
Ifop	15 Jan 2007	868	–	48%	52%
TNS Sofres	10–12 Jan 2007	1,000	–	52%	48%
Ipsos	5–6 Jan 2007	952	–	50%	50%
Ifop	4–5 Jan 2007	939	–	50.5%	49.5%
CSA	3 Jan 2007	891	–	52%	48%
Ifop-Fiducial	14–15 Dec 2006	951	–	50%	50%
BVA	11–12 Dec 2006	797	–	51%	49%
Ipsos	8–9 Dec 2006	952	–	50%	50%
Ipsos	1–2 Dec 2006	950	–	49%	51%
Ifop	30 Nov–1 Dec 2006	901	–	50%	50%
CSA	21–22 Nov 2006	1,002	–	53%	47%
Ifop	17–18 Nov 2006	817	–	51%	49%
Ipsos	9–11 Nov 2006	948	–	50%	50%
CSA	8 Nov 2006	1,007	–	51%	49%
CSA	17–18 Oct 2006	838	–	52%	48%
Ifop	12–13 Oct 2006	892	–	47%	53%
TNS Sofres	12–13 Oct 2006	1,000	–	51%	49%
Ipsos	6–7 Oct 2006	944	–	50%	50%
CSA	13–14 Sep 2006	907	–	52%	48%
Ipsos	8–9 Sep 2006	954	–	48%	52%
Ipsos	18–19 Aug 2006	963	–	49%	51%
Ipsos	7–8 Jul 2006	944	–	49%	51%
Ifop	29–30 Jun 2006	800	–	51%	49%
Ipsos	9–10 Jun 2006	959	–	49%	51%
CSA	7 Jun 2006	844	–	51%	49%
CSA	16–17 May 2006	777	–	53%	47%
Ipsos	12–13 May 2006	939	–	51%	49%
Ifop	20–21 Apr 2006	883	–	49%	51%
CSA	18–19 Apr 2006	878	–	53%	47%
TNS Sofres	18 Apr 2006	1,000	–	51%	49%
Ipsos	7–8 Apr 2006	947	–	51%	49%
CSA	29 Mar 2006	839	–	52%	48%
Ipsos	10–11 Mar 2006	945	–	50%	50%
Ipsos	10–11 Feb 2006	930	–	49%	51%
BVA	27–28 Jan 2006	951	–	49%	51%
CSA	25–26 Jan 2006	865	–	51%	49%
BVA	30 Sep–1 Oct 2005	811	–	47%	53%

==== By region ====
Nord-Pas-de-Calais

Polling firm	Fieldwork date	Sample size	Abs.	Royal PS	Sarkozy UMP
2007 election	6 May 2007	–	17.56%	49.69%	50.31%
BVA	16–17 Apr 2007	805	–	51%	49%
BVA	19–20 Mar 2007	804	–	50%	50%
BVA	21 Feb 2007	805	–	51%	49%
BVA	16–17 Feb 2007	805	–	48%	52%

Provence-Alpes-Côte-d'Azur

Polling firm	Fieldwork date	Sample size	Abs.	Royal PS	Sarkozy UMP
2007 election	6 May 2007	–	15.14%	38.16%	61.84%
CSA	2–7 Jan 2007	1,000	–	45%	55%

Provence-Alpes-Côte-d'Azur and Languedoc-Roussillon

Polling firm	Fieldwork date	Sample size	Abs.	Royal PS	Sarkozy UMP
2007 election	6 May 2007	–	14.74%	40.93%	59.07%
BVA	11–14 Dec 2006	810	–	48%	52%

Corsica

Polling firm	Fieldwork date	Sample size	Abs.	Royal PS	Sarkozy UMP
2007 election	6 May 2007	–	21.42%	39.88%	60.12%
Ifop	20–21 Mar 2007	504	–	43%	57%

La Réunion

Polling firm	Fieldwork date	Sample size	Abs.	Royal PS	Sarkozy UMP
2007 election	6 May 2007	–	22.81%	63.57%	36.43%
Ipsos	6–9 Mar 2007	786	–	57%	43%
Ipsos	29 Nov–9 Dec 2006	447	–	70%	30%
Ipsos	12–18 Sep 2006	–	–	57%	43%

==== By department ====
Alpes-de-Haute-Provence, Hautes-Alpes, and Vaucluse

Polling firm	Fieldwork date	Sample size	Abs.	Royal PS	Sarkozy UMP
2007 election	6 May 2007	–	13.66%	42.04%	57.96%
CSA	2–7 Jan 2007	–	–	48%	52%

Alpes-Maritimes, Bouches-du-Rhône, and Var

Polling firm	Fieldwork date	Sample size	Abs.	Royal PS	Sarkozy UMP
2007 election	6 May 2007	–	15.46%	37.30%	62.70%
CSA	2–7 Jan 2007	–	–	42%	58%

Ariège, Aveyron, Haute-Garonne, Gers, Lot, Hautes-Pyrénées, Tarn, Tarn-et-Garonne, Aude, and Lot-et-Garonne

The BVA poll was conducted for La Dépêche du Midi in the 10 departments where the newspaper is circulated, of which eight are in the Midi-Pyrénées region (Ariège, Aveyron, Haute-Garonne, Gers, Lot, Hautes-Pyrénées, Tarn, and Tarn-et-Garonne), as well as Aude and Lot-et-Garonne.

Polling firm	Fieldwork date	Sample size	Abs.	Royal PS	Sarkozy UMP
2007 election	6 May 2007	–	12.59%	52.46%	47.54%
BVA	26–28 Apr 2007	803	–	52%	48%

==== By commune ====
Aix-en-Provence

Polling firm	Fieldwork date	Sample size	Abs.	Royal PS	Sarkozy UMP
2007 election	6 May 2007	–	15.67%	42.70%	57.30%
CSA	2–7 Jan 2007	513	–	48%	52%

Avignon

Polling firm	Fieldwork date	Sample size	Abs.	Royal PS	Sarkozy UMP
2007 election	6 May 2007	–	16.04%	47.98%	52.02%
CSA	2–7 Jan 2007	501	–	51%	49%

Marseille

Polling firm	Fieldwork date	Sample size	Abs.	Royal PS	Sarkozy UMP
2007 election	6 May 2007	–	16.51%	44.28%	55.72%
CSA	2–7 Jan 2007	503	–	48%	52%

Nice

Polling firm	Fieldwork date	Sample size	Abs.	Royal PS	Sarkozy UMP
2007 election	6 May 2007	–	17.24%	34.66%	65.34%
CSA	2–7 Jan 2007	501	–	40%	60%

Toulon

Polling firm	Fieldwork date	Sample size	Abs.	Royal PS	Sarkozy UMP
2007 election	6 May 2007	–	18.14%	37.23%	62.77%
CSA	2–7 Jan 2007	502	–	41%	59%

=== Bayrou–Sarkozy ===
Polling firm	Fieldwork date	Sample size	Bayrou UDF	Sarkozy UMP
Ipsos	19–20 Apr 2007	1,598	52.5%	47.5%
Ipsos	18–19 Apr 2007	1,209	52%	48%
TNS Sofres	18–19 Apr 2007	1,000	53%	47%
Ifop-Fiducial	17–19 Apr 2007	952	55%	45%
Ipsos	17–18 Apr 2007	1,212	52%	48%
Ipsos	16–17 Apr 2007	1,009	53%	47%
Ipsos	14–16 Apr 2007	1,357	54%	46%
Ipsos	12–14 Apr 2007	1,355	53.5%	46.5%
Ipsos	11–13 Apr 2007	1,279	53%	47%
Ipsos	10–12 Apr 2007	1,207	53%	47%
Ipsos	9–11 Apr 2007	1,209	53.5%	46.5%
Ipsos	7–10 Apr 2007	1,300	53.5%	46.5%
Ipsos	6–9 Apr 2007	1,355	53.5%	46.5%
Ipsos	5–7 Apr 2007	1,355	53%	47%
Ipsos	4–6 Apr 2007	1,263	52%	48%
TNS Sofres	4–5 Apr 2007	1,000	52%	48%
Ipsos	3–5 Apr 2007	1,208	51.5%	48.5%
Ipsos	2–4 Apr 2007	1,209	51%	49%
Ipsos	31 Mar–3 Apr 2007	1,272	51%	49%
Ipsos	30 Mar–2 Apr 2007	1,344	51%	49%
Ipsos	29–31 Mar 2007	1,341	52%	48%
Ipsos	28–30 Mar 2007	1,277	51.5%	48.5%
Ipsos	27–29 Mar 2007	1,104	51%	49%
Ifop-Fiducial	26–28 Mar 2007	954	54%	46%
Ipsos	24–27 Mar 2007	1,110	52%	48%
Ipsos	23–26 Mar 2007	1,247	52.5%	47.5%
LH2	23–24 Mar 2007	1,004	60%	40%
Ipsos	22–24 Mar 2007	1,245	53%	47%
Ipsos	21–23 Mar 2007	1,143	53%	47%
Ipsos	20–22 Mar 2007	1,006	52%	48%
Ipsos	19–21 Mar 2007	1,009	53%	47%
Ipsos	17–20 Mar 2007	1,069	54%	46%
Ifop	19 Mar 2007	872	54%	46%
Ipsos	16–19 Mar 2007	1,253	55%	45%
LH2	16–17 Mar 2007	1,003	57%	43%
TNS Sofres	14–15 Mar 2007	1,000	54%	46%
BVA	12–13 Mar 2007	861	55%	45%
LH2	9–10 Mar 2007	1,000	55%	45%
BVA	5–6 Mar 2007	853	55%	45%
BVA	26–27 Feb 2007	869	54%	46%
BVA	19–20 Feb 2007	845	54%	46%
Ifop-Fiducial	13–15 Feb 2007	952	52%	48%
Ipsos	9–10 Feb 2007	944	47%	53%
BVA	7–8 Feb 2007	843	49%	51%
Ifop-Fiducial	18–20 Jan 2007	956	49%	51%
TNS Sofres	17–18 Jan 2007	1,000	44%	56%
Ifop-Fiducial	14–15 Dec 2006	951	45%	55%

==== By region ====
Nord-Pas-de-Calais

Polling firm	Fieldwork date	Sample size	Bayrou UDF	Sarkozy UMP
BVA	21 Feb 2007	805	57%	43%
BVA	16–17 Feb 2007	805	56%	44%

La Réunion

Polling firm	Fieldwork date	Sample size	Bayrou UDF	Sarkozy UMP
Ipsos	6–9 Mar 2007	786	44%	56%

=== Royal–Bayrou ===
Polling firm	Fieldwork date	Sample size	Royal PS	Bayrou UDF
Ifop-Fiducial	17–19 Apr 2007	952	42%	58%
Ifop-Fiducial	26–28 Mar 2007	954	43%	57%
TNS Sofres	14–15 Mar 2007	1,000	40%	60%
BVA	26–27 Feb 2007	869	45%	55%
BVA	19–20 Feb 2007	845	48%	52%
Ifop-Fiducial	13–15 Feb 2007	952	46%	54%
BVA	7–8 Feb 2007	843	48%	52%
Ifop-Fiducial	18–20 Jan 2007	956	50%	50%
TNS Sofres	17–18 Jan 2007	1,000	57%	43%
Ifop-Fiducial	14–15 Dec 2006	951	57%	43%

==== By region ====
Nord-Pas-de-Calais

Polling firm	Fieldwork date	Sample size	Royal PS	Bayrou UDF
BVA	21 Feb 2007	805	46%	54%
BVA	16–17 Feb 2007	805	47%	53%

La Réunion

Polling firm	Fieldwork date	Sample size	Royal PS	Bayrou UDF
Ipsos	6–9 Mar 2007	786	68%	32%

=== Sarkozy–Le Pen ===
Polling firm	Fieldwork date	Sample size	Sarkozy UMP	Le Pen FN
Ifop-Fiducial	13–15 Feb 2007	952	86%	14%
Ifop-Fiducial	18–20 Jan 2007	956	84%	16%
TNS Sofres	17–18 Jan 2007	1,000	85%	15%
Ifop-Fiducial	14–15 Dec 2006	951	85%	15%

==== By region ====
Provence-Alpes-Côte-d'Azur

Polling firm	Fieldwork date	Sample size	Sarkozy UMP	Le Pen FN
CSA	2–7 Jan 2007	1,000	83%	17%

==== By department ====
Alpes-de-Haute-Provence, Hautes-Alpes, and Vaucluse

Polling firm	Fieldwork date	Sample size	Sarkozy UMP	Le Pen FN
CSA	2–7 Jan 2007	–	81%	19%

Alpes-Maritimes, Bouches-du-Rhône, and Var

Polling firm	Fieldwork date	Sample size	Sarkozy UMP	Le Pen FN
CSA	2–7 Jan 2007	–	86%	14%

==== By commune ====
Polling firm	Fieldwork date	Sample size	Commune	Sarkozy UMP	Le Pen FN
CSA	2–7 Jan 2007	513	Aix-en-Provence	85%	15%
CSA	2–7 Jan 2007	501	Avignon	79%	21%
CSA	2–7 Jan 2007	503	Marseille	83%	17%
CSA	2–7 Jan 2007	501	Nice	84%	16%
CSA	2–7 Jan 2007	502	Toulon	79%	21%

=== Royal–Le Pen ===
Polling firm	Fieldwork date	Sample size	Royal PS	Le Pen FN
Ifop-Fiducial	13–15 Feb 2007	952	73%	27%
Ifop-Fiducial	18–20 Jan 2007	956	78%	22%
TNS Sofres	17–18 Jan 2007	1,000	78%	22%
Ifop-Fiducial	14–15 Dec 2006	951	78%	22%

==== By region ====
Provence-Alpes-Côte-d'Azur

Polling firm	Fieldwork date	Sample size	Royal PS	Le Pen FN
CSA	2–7 Jan 2007	1,000	64%	36%

==== By department ====
Alpes-de-Haute-Provence, Hautes-Alpes, and Vaucluse

Polling firm	Fieldwork date	Sample size	Royal PS	Le Pen FN
CSA	2–7 Jan 2007	–	66%	34%

Alpes-Maritimes, Bouches-du-Rhône, and Var

Polling firm	Fieldwork date	Sample size	Royal PS	Le Pen FN
CSA	2–7 Jan 2007	–	62%	38%

==== By commune ====
Polling firm	Fieldwork date	Sample size	Commune	Royal PS	Le Pen FN
CSA	2–7 Jan 2007	513	Aix-en-Provence	70%	30%
CSA	2–7 Jan 2007	501	Avignon	66%	34%
CSA	2–7 Jan 2007	503	Marseille	63%	37%
CSA	2–7 Jan 2007	501	Nice	64%	36%
CSA	2–7 Jan 2007	502	Toulon	57%	43%

=== Bayrou–Le Pen ===
Polling firm	Fieldwork date	Sample size	Bayrou UDF	Le Pen FN
Ifop-Fiducial	13–15 Feb 2007	952	83%	17%
Ifop-Fiducial	18–20 Jan 2007	956	81%	19%
Ifop-Fiducial	14–15 Dec 2006	951	81%	19%

=== Royal–Chirac ===
Polling firm	Fieldwork date	Sample size	Royal PS	Chirac UMP
Ifop-Fiducial	13–15 Feb 2007	952	54%	46%
Ifop-Fiducial	18–20 Jan 2007	956	61%	39%
Ifop-Fiducial	14–15 Dec 2006	951	61%	39%
Ifop	17–18 Nov 2006	817	59%	41%

==== By region ====
Provence-Alpes-Côte-d'Azur and Languedoc-Roussillon

Polling firm	Fieldwork date	Sample size	Royal PS	Chirac UMP
BVA	11–14 Dec 2006	810	64%	36%

=== Chirac–Le Pen ===
Polling firm	Fieldwork date	Sample size	Abs.	Chirac UMP	Le Pen FN
Ifop-Fiducial	13–15 Feb 2007	952	–	81%	19%
Ifop-Fiducial	18–20 Jan 2007	956	–	80%	20%
Ifop-Fiducial	14–15 Dec 2006	951	–	80%	20%
2002 election	5 May 2002	–	20.29%	82.21%	17.79%

=== Strauss-Kahn–Sarkozy ===
Polling firm	Fieldwork date	Sample size	Strauss-Kahn PS	Sarkozy UMP
CSA	8 Nov 2006	1,007	46%	54%
Ifop	12–13 Oct 2006	892	43%	57%
Ifop	20–21 Apr 2006	883	41%	59%
CSA	28–29 Jun 2005	809	38%	62%
BVA	30 Sep–1 Oct 2005	811	43%	57%
BVA	25–26 May 2004	763	48%	52%

=== Fabius–Sarkozy ===
Polling firm	Fieldwork date	Sample size	Fabius PS	Sarkozy UMP
CSA	8 Nov 2006	1,007	42%	58%
Ifop	12–13 Oct 2006	892	39%	61%
Ifop	20–21 Apr 2006	883	39%	61%
CSA	28–29 Jun 2005	809	40%	60%
BVA	30 Sep–1 Oct 2005	811	42%	58%
BVA	27–29 Jun 2005	860	43%	57%
BVA	25–26 May 2004	763	44%	56%

=== Royal–Villepin ===
Polling firm	Fieldwork date	Sample size	Royal PS	Villepin UMP
TNS Sofres	12–13 Oct 2006	1,000	60%	40%
Ipsos	6–7 Oct 2006	944	60%	40%
Ipsos	8–9 Sep 2006	954	59%	41%
Ipsos	18–19 Aug 2006	963	61%	39%
Ipsos	7–8 Jul 2006	944	61%	39%
Ipsos	9–10 Jun 2006	959	63%	37%
Ipsos	12–13 May 2006	939	62%	38%
Ipsos	7–8 Apr 2006	947	57%	43%
Ipsos	10–11 Mar 2006	945	53%	47%
Ipsos	10–11 Feb 2006	930	52%	48%
BVA	27–28 Jan 2006	951	48%	52%
BVA	30 Sep–1 Oct 2005	811	49%	51%

==== By region ====
La Réunion

Polling firm	Fieldwork date	Sample size	Royal PS	Villepin UMP
Ipsos	12–18 Sep 2006	–	63%	37%

=== Royal–Alliot-Marie ===
Polling firm	Fieldwork date	Sample size	Royal PS	Alliot-Marie UMP
Ifop	12–13 Oct 2006	892	58%	42%
TNS Sofres	12–13 Oct 2006	1,000	63%	37%

=== Jospin–Sarkozy ===
Polling firm	Fieldwork date	Sample size	Jospin PS	Sarkozy UMP
Ifop	29–30 Jun 2006	800	43%	57%
Ifop	20–21 Apr 2006	883	44%	56%
BVA	27–28 Jan 2006	951	46%	54%
CSA	28–29 Jun 2005	809	46%	54%
BVA	27–29 Jun 2005	860	47%	53%
BVA	12–13 Feb 2005	953	47%	53%
BVA	2–3 Jun 2004	725	49%	51%

==== By region ====
La Réunion

Polling firm	Fieldwork date	Sample size	Jospin PS	Sarkozy UMP
Ipsos	12–18 Sep 2006	–	54%	46%

=== Lang–Sarkozy ===
Polling firm	Fieldwork date	Sample size	Lang PS	Sarkozy UMP
Ifop	20–21 Apr 2006	883	44%	56%
BVA	2–3 Jun 2004	725	45%	55%

=== Hollande–Sarkozy ===
Polling firm	Fieldwork date	Sample size	Hollande PS	Sarkozy UMP
Ifop	20–21 Apr 2006	883	42%	58%
CSA	28–29 Jun 2005	809	41%	59%
BVA	12–13 Feb 2005	953	46%	54%
BVA	2–3 Jun 2004	725	44%	56%

=== Jospin–Villepin ===
Polling firm	Fieldwork date	Sample size	Jospin PS	Villepin UMP
BVA	27–28 Jan 2006	951	45%	55%
CSA	28–29 Jun 2005	809	50%	50%

==== By region ====
La Réunion

Polling firm	Fieldwork date	Sample size	Jospin PS	Villepin UMP
Ipsos	12–18 Sep 2006	–	58%	42%

=== Strauss-Kahn–Villepin ===
Polling firm	Fieldwork date	Sample size	Strauss-Kahn PS	Villepin UMP
CSA	28–29 Jun 2005	809	44%	56%
BVA	30 Sep–1 Oct 2005	811	43%	57%

=== Fabius–Villepin ===
Polling firm	Fieldwork date	Sample size	Fabius PS	Villepin UMP
CSA	28–29 Jun 2005	809	43%	57%
BVA	30 Sep–1 Oct 2005	811	41%	59%

=== Hollande–Villepin ===
Polling firm	Fieldwork date	Sample size	Hollande PS	Villepin UMP
CSA	28–29 Jun 2005	809	40%	60%

=== Emmanuelli–Sarkozy ===
Polling firm	Fieldwork date	Sample size	Emmanuelli PS	Sarkozy UMP
CSA	28–29 Jun 2005	809	33%	67%

=== Emmanuelli–Villepin ===
Polling firm	Fieldwork date	Sample size	Emmanuelli PS	Villepin UMP
CSA	28–29 Jun 2005	809	33%	67%

=== Fabius–Chirac ===
Polling firm	Fieldwork date	Sample size	Fabius PS	Chirac UMP
BVA	27–29 Jun 2005	860	56%	44%

=== Jospin–Chirac ===
Polling firm	Fieldwork date	Sample size	Jospin PS	Chirac UMP
BVA	27–29 Jun 2005	860	61%	39%
BVA	12–13 Feb 2005	953	50%	50%

=== Hollande–Chirac ===
Polling firm	Fieldwork date	Sample size	Hollande PS	Chirac UMP
BVA	12–13 Feb 2005	953	49%	51%

== See also ==
- Opinion polling for the French legislative election, 2007
- Opinion polling for the French presidential election, 2002
- Opinion polling for the French presidential election, 2012
- Opinion polling for the French presidential election, 2017
