= Stéphane Testé =

French politician

Stéphane Testé is a French politician of La République En Marche! (LREM) who was a member of the French National Assembly from 2017 to 2022, representing the 12th constituency of the department of Seine-Saint-Denis.

== Career ==
In parliament, Testé serves as member of the Committee on Cultural Affairs and Education. In addition to his committee assignments, he is part of the French-Turkish Parliamentary Friendship Group.

In July 2019, Testé decided not to align with his parliamentary group's majority and became one of 52 LREM members who abstained from a vote on the French ratification of the European Union’s Comprehensive Economic and Trade Agreement (CETA) with Canada.

Testé lost his seat in the 2022 French legislative election to Jérôme Legavre from the Independent Workers' Party.

== See also ==
- 2017 French legislative election
