= 1999 European Parliament election in France =

- 13 June 1999
- All 87 French seats in the European Parliament
- Turnout: 46.76
Party	Leader	Vote %	Seats	+/–
PS–MDC–PRG	François Hollande	21.95	22	−6
The Alliance	Charles Pasqua	13.06	13	0
RPR–DL	Nicolas Sarkozy	12.82	12	−2
LV	Daniel Cohn-Bendit	9.72	9	+9
UDF	François Bayrou	9.29	9	−5
PCF	Robert Hue	6.78	6	−1
CPNT	Jean Saint-Josse	6.78	6	+6
FN	Jean-Marie Le Pen	5.70	5	−6
LO–LCR	Arlette Laguiller; Alain Krivine	5.18	5	+5
This lists parties that won seats. See the complete results below.

European Parliament elections were held in France on 13 June 1999. Once again, abstention was very high for this type of election- only 47% of eligible voters voted. The election was also the first French European election to be won by the Socialist Party (PS).

In a major surprise and historical upset for the government, Charles Pasqua's and Philippe de Villiers' list uniting Pasqua's new Gaullist Rally for France (RPF) and de Villiers' eurosceptic Movement for France (MPF) list surpassed the list of President Jacques Chirac's RPR-Liberal Democracy, led by Nicolas Sarkozy. The election ended Sarkozy's immediate political future, including a run for the presidency of the Rally for the Republic – Michèle Alliot-Marie, a close supporter of Chirac, succeeded him. However, the alliance between Pasqua and de Villiers proved to be ephemeral. de Villiers broke with Pasqua later 2000 and thus ended the RPF's chance to become a large common party for all eurosceptic Gaullists from within the RPR.

The New Union for French Democracy (Nouvelle UDF), led by François Bayrou ran independently of the RPR, contrary to Chirac's wishes, for the first time since 1984. Bayrou won a relatively good result, 9.28%, allowing him to pursue his more independent political strategy (slowly distancing the party from the RPR) within the New UDF.

The other winner of the election were The Greens led by Franco-German green politician Daniel Cohn-Bendit, whose list won 9.72%, the party's second-best result after 1989.

Minor parties, including the agrarian populist Hunting, Fishing, Nature, Traditions and the far-left Workers' Struggle obtained very good results and elected 6 and 5 MEP's respectively.

The far-right FN was penalized by Bruno Megret's dissident MNR list and obtained a low result. The French Communist Party also did poorly.

== Results ==
Party	Votes	%	Seats	+/–
PS–MDC–PRG	3,874,231	21.95	22	–6
Rally for France–Movement for France	2,304,544	13.06	13	0
Rally for the Republic–Liberal Democracy	2,263,201	12.82	12	–2
The Greens	1,715,729	9.72	9	+9
Union for French Democracy	1,638,999	9.29	9	–5
French Communist Party	1,196,491	6.78	6	–1
Hunting, Fishing, Nature, Traditions	1,195,863	6.78	6	+6
National Front	1,005,285	5.70	5	–6
Lutte Ouvrière–Revolutionary Communist League	914,811	5.18	5	+5
National Republican Movement	578,837	3.28	0	New
Less Taxes Now!	312,450	1.77	0	New
Independent Ecological Movement	268,038	1.52	0	New
Fight for Jobs	178,064	1.01	0	New
Living Energy–France	124,561	0.71	0	New
Natural Law Party	71,409	0.40	0	0
Humanist Party	1,995	0.01	0	New
Martiniquean Liberal Movement	1,707	0.01	0	New
Nationalist League	683	0.00	0	New
Life Policy for Europe	274	0.00	0	0
Federalist Party	0	0.00	0	New
Total	17,647,172	100.00	87	0
Valid votes	17,647,172	94.04		
Invalid/blank votes	1,118,983	5.96		
Total votes	18,766,155	100.00		
Registered voters/turnout	40,132,517	46.76		
Source: France Politique
