= Seine-Saint-Denis's 12th constituency =

Constituency of the National Assembly of France

12th constituency of Seine-Saint-Denis
- inline Constituency of the National Assembly of France

- Deputy: Jérôme Legavre; POI
- Department: Seine-Saint-Denis
- Registered voters: 64,794

The 12th constituency of Seine-Saint-Denis (French: Douzième circonscription de la Seine-Saint-Denis) is one of the 12 legislative constituencies in Seine-Saint-Denis département of France (93). Like the other 576 French constituencies, it elects one MP using the two-round system.

== Deputies ==
Election	Member	Party	Source
1988	Éric Raoult	RPR	
1993	Éric Raoult	RPR	
1997	Alain Calmat	DVG	
2002	Éric Raoult	UMP	
2007	Éric Raoult	UMP	
2012	Pascal Popelin	PS	
2017	Stéphane Testé	LREM	
2022	Jérôme Legavre	POI	

== Election results ==
=== 2024 ===
Candidate	Party	Alliance	First round			Second round		
Candidate	Party	Alliance	Votes	%	+/–	Votes	%	+/–
Jérôme Legavre	POI	NFP	17,566	45.11	+11.52	22,974	64.59	+13.48
Jean-François Perier	RN		10,140	26.04	+10.62	12,596	35.41	N/A
Xavier Lemoine	DVD		5,016	12.88	N/A			
Virginie Roitman	HOR	ENS	4,893	12.57	-11.29			
Francis Dijos	REC		546	1.40	-3.86			
Amal Aissaoui	LO		503	1.29	+0.35			
Dominique Vincenot	DIV		273	0.70	N/A			
Serjan Kirma	DIV		0	0.00	N/A			
Didier Martinot	DIV		0	0.00	N/A			
Valid votes			38,937	97.72	-0.33	35,570	91.64	
Blank votes			650	1.63	+0.17	2,596	6.69	+1.86
Null votes			260	0.65	+0.16	648	1.67	-0.12
Turnout			39,847	60.03	+22.18	38,814	58.45	+21.05
Abstentions			26,527	39.97	-22.18	27,589	41.55	-21.05
Registered voters			66,374			66,403		
Source: Ministry of the Interior, Le Monde
Result						POI HOLD		

=== 2022 ===
Legislative Election 2022: Seine-Saint-Denis's 12th constituency
Party	Candidate	Votes	%	±%
POI (NUPÉS)	Jérôme Legavre	7,485	30.83	+4.07
LREM (Ensemble)	Stéphane Testé	5,793	23.86	-9.98
RN	Jean-François Perier	3,743	15.42	+0.36
UDI (UDC)	Ludovic Toro	3,512	14.47	−5.22
REC	Pierre Marie Salle	1,278	5.26	N/A
REG	Mariam Cisse	931	3.84	N/A
DVG	Stéphanie Klebek	539	2.22	N/A
Others	N/A	994		
Turnout		24,756	37.85	−2.70
2nd round result
POI (NUPÉS)	Jérôme Legavre	11,677	51.11	N/A
LREM (Ensemble)	Stéphane Testé	11,171	48.89	−4.11
Turnout		22,848	37.40	+4.29
POI gain from LREM				

=== 2017 ===
Legislative Election 2017: Seine-Saint-Denis's 12th constituency
Party	Candidate	Votes	%	±%
LREM	Stéphane Testé	8,730	33.84	N/A
UDI	Ludovic Toro	5,078	19.69	N/A
FN	Jordan Bardella	3,886	15.06	−1.35
LFI	Juan Branco	3,596	13.94	N/A
PS	Samira Tayebi Bouhout	2,028	7.86	−29.36
PCF	François Cochain	640	2.48	−2.88
EELV	Ginette Contrastin	639	2.48	−2.46
Others	N/A	1,198		
Turnout		26,274	40.55	−11.08
2nd round result
LREM	Stéphane Testé	10,196	53.00	N/A
UDI	Ludovic Toro	9,042	47.00	N/A
Turnout		21,455	33.11	−16.52
LREM gain from PS		Swing		

=== 2012 ===
Legislative Election 2012: Seine-Saint-Denis's 12th constituency
Party	Candidate	Votes	%	±%
PS	Pascal Popelin	12,387	37.22	+8.80
UMP	Éric Raoult	9,953	29.91	−17.00
FN	Gisèle Metay	5,461	16.41	+10.21
FG	Martine Louaire	1,783	5.36	+1.86
EELV	Abdelali Meziane	1,643	4.94	+2.45
Others	N/A	2,054		
Turnout		33,278	51.63	−5.52
2nd round result
PS	Pascal Popelin	17,308	54.10	+7.92
UMP	Éric Raoult	14,682	45.90	−7.92
Turnout		31,990	49.63	−4.61
PS gain from UMP				

=== 2007 ===
Legislative Election 2007: Seine-Saint-Denis's 12th constituency
Party	Candidate	Votes	%	±%
UMP	Éric Raoult	16,353	46.91	+8.11
PS	Pascal Popelin	9,907	28.42	N/A
FN	Dominique Lausanne	2,163	6.20	−9.44
MoDem	Ahmed Khelifi	1,615	4.63	N/A
PCF	Jack Potavin	1,221	3.50	N/A
Far left	Samir Mihi	1,004	2.88	N/A
LV	Ginette Contrastin	867	2.49	N/A
Far left	Marianne Inayetian	821	2.36	N/A
Others	N/A	909		
Turnout		35,349	57.15	−6.64
2nd round result
UMP	Éric Raoult	17,564	53.82	+1.07
PS	Pascal Popelin	15,068	46.18	N/A
Turnout		33,545	54.24	−5.40
UMP hold				

=== 2002 ===
Legislative Election 2002: Seine-Saint-Denis's 12th constituency
Party	Candidate	Votes	%	±%
UMP	Éric Raoult	13,664	38.80	+11.60
DVG	Alain Calmat	12,652	35.92	+6.68
FN	Laura Barsanti-Rabourdin	5,510	15.64	−6.41
Others	N/A	3,394		
Turnout		35,729	63.79	−2.09
2nd round result
UMP	Éric Raoult	17,060	52.75	+12.17
DVG	Alain Calmat	15,284	47.25	+3.27
Turnout		33,403	59.64	−12.22
UMP gain from DVG				

=== 1997 ===
Legislative Election 1997: Seine-Saint-Denis's 12th constituency
Party	Candidate	Votes	%	±%
DVG	Alain Calmat	10,582	29.24	
RPR	Éric Raoult	9,842	27.20	
FN	Franck Timmermans	7,981	22.05	
PCF	Henriette Zoughebi	2,421	6.69	
DVD	Xavier Lemonie	980	2.71	
LO	Patrick Pennetier	869	2.40	
DVE	René Magne	782	2.16	
Others	N/A	2,731		
Turnout		37,431	65.88	
2nd round result
DVG	Alain Calmat	17,473	43.98	
RPR	Éric Raoult	16,122	40.58	
FN	Franck Timmermans	6,136	15.44	
Turnout		40,830	71.86	
DVG gain from RPR				
