= Jérôme Legavre =

French politician (born 1972)

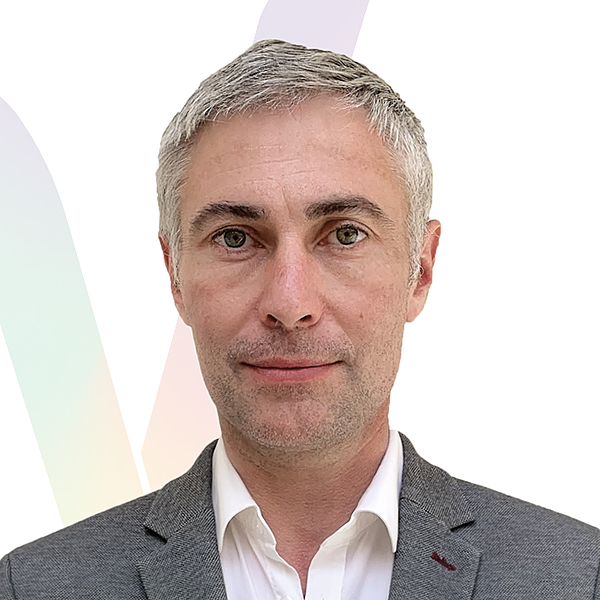
- Legavre in 2022

Member of the National Assembly for Seine-Saint-Denis's 12th constituency
- Incumbent
- Assumed office 22 June 2022
- Preceded by: Stéphane Testé

Personal details
- Born: 20 August 1972 (age 54) Rennes, France
- Party: Independent Workers' Party
- Other political affiliations: NUPES (2022)

Jérôme Legavre (born 20 August 1972) is a French politician from the Independent Workers' Party. He became the Member of Parliament for Seine-Saint-Denis's 12th constituency in the 2022 French legislative election.

== See also ==
- List of deputies of the 16th National Assembly of France
