= Éric Raoult =

French politician (1955–2021)

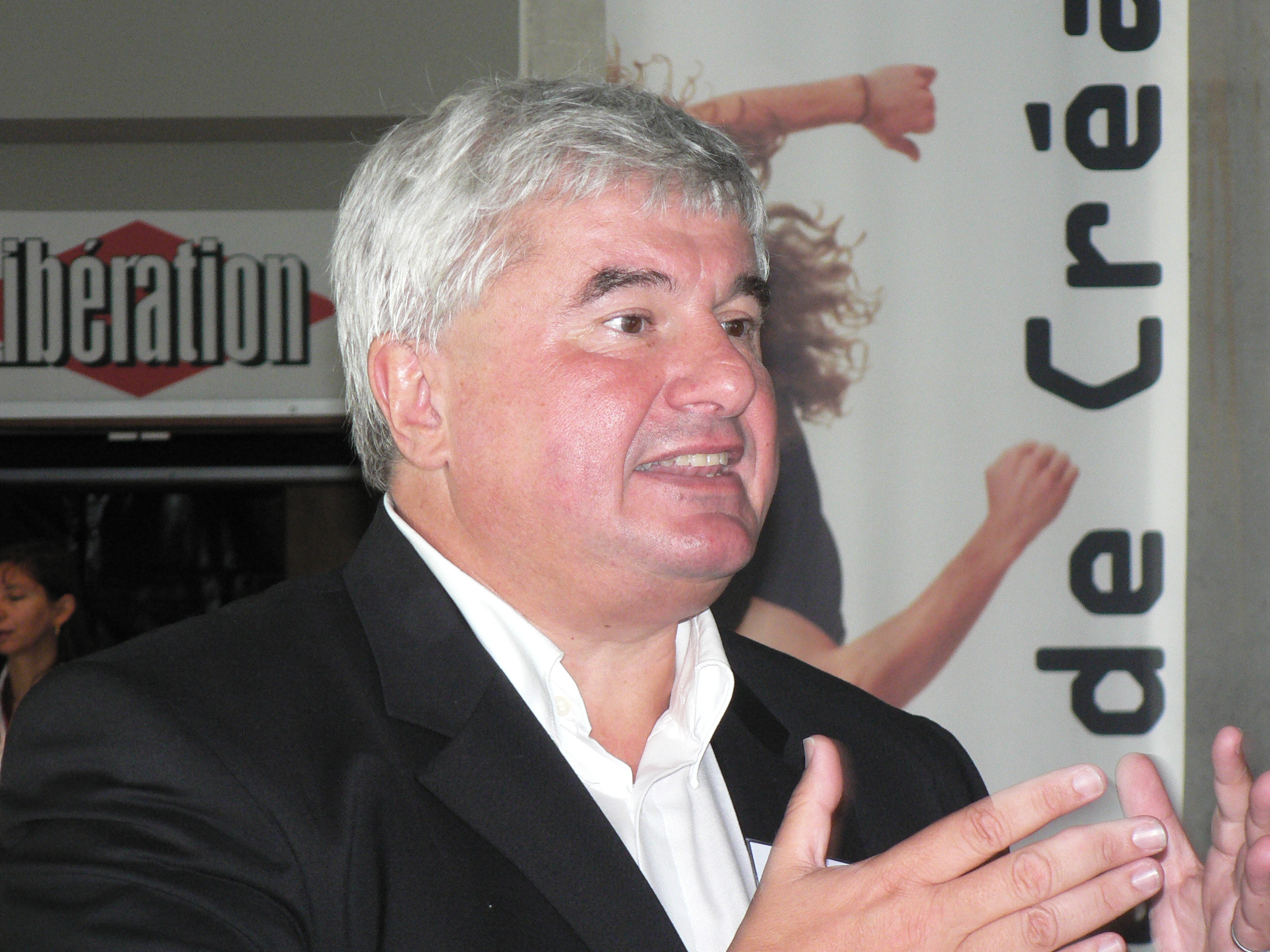

Mayor of Le Raincy
- In office 1995–2014
- Preceded by: Raymond Mège
- Succeeded by: Jean-Michel Genestier

Member of the National Assembly for Seine-Saint-Denis's 12th constituency
- In office 2002–2012
- Preceded by: Alain Calmat
- Succeeded by: Pascal Popelin

Personal details
- Born: 19 June 1955 Paris, France
- Died: 16 April 2021 (aged 65)
- Party: The Republicans
- Education: Sciences Po

Éric Raoult (19 June 1955 – 16 April 2021) was a French politician, affiliated to The Republicans.

== Political career ==
Raoult started his political career as aide to the mayor of Le Raincy, in 1983. He was first elected deputy in 1986.

In 1995, Raoult was Minister in charge of "integration and activities against exclusion". He was mayor of Le Raincy from 1995 until 2014.

Raoult was elected deputy for Seine-Saint-Denis in 2002, and reelected in 2007. He was the vice-president of the National Assembly. He lost his seat to Pascal Popelin in 2012.

During the 2005 civil unrest, Le Raincy was, although untouched by the riots, the first town to decree a curfew.

In 2007, Raoult voted against inscribing the abolition of capital punishment in the Constitution, advocating reserves for cases of "war, imminent danger or terrorist attacks".

In 2014, he was accused of sexual harassment by a former employee who claimed he had sent her 15,000 text messages in nine months. Eric Raoult acknowledged the text messages, but denied sexual harassment. In March 2014, he lost the election for mayor of Le Raincy to Jean-Michel Genestier.

== Political career ==
Governmental functions

Minister for Integration and the fight against exclusion. May–November 1995.

Minister Delegate to the Minister of Planning, City and Integration : November 1995 – 1997.

Electoral mandates

National Assembly of France

Vice-president of the National Assembly of France : 2002–2007.

Member of the National Assembly of France for Seine-Saint-Denis : 1986-1995 (Became minister in 1995) / Since 2002. Elected in 1986, reelected in 1988, 1993, 2002, 2007.

Regional Council

Regional councillor of Ile-de-France : 1992-2004 (Resignation). Reelected in 2004.

Municipal Council

Mayor of Le Raincy : Since 1995. Reelected in 2001, 2008.

Deputy-mayor of Le Raincy : 1983–1995. Reelected in 1989.

Municipal councillor of Le Raincy : Since 1983. Reelected in 1989, 1995, 2001, 2008.

== Personal life ==
Raoult was divorcing his wife, Corinne.
