= Workers' Party (France, 1991–2008) =

French socialist political party

Workers' Party Parti des Travailleurs
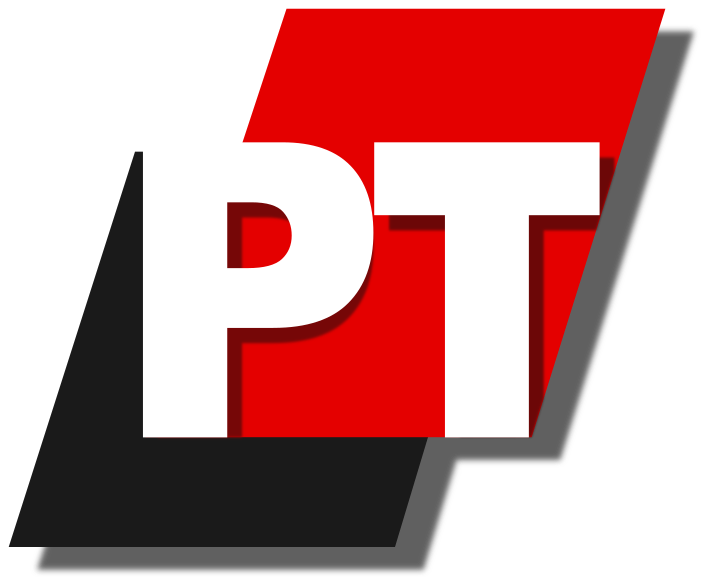
- Abbreviation: PT
- General Secretary: Daniel Gluckstein
- Founded: November 11, 1991; 34 years ago
- Dissolved: June 15, 2008; 18 years ago
- Merger of: MPPT; UAS
- Headquarters: 87, Rue du Faubourg-Saint-Denis, Paris
- Ideology: Lambertism; Trotskism; Libertarian Marxism
- Political position: Far-left
- International affiliation: EIT

The Workers' Party (French: Parti des Travailleurs, PT) was a French Trotskyist party. It was formed by the Trotskyist Internationalist Communist Party (PCI), led by Pierre Boussel, better known under his pseudonym Pierre Lambert, together with a number of other socialists with whom they worked in the Force Ouvrière union confederation.

Within the PT the former PCI was known as the Internationalist Communist Organisation. In reality, despite including communist, socialist and anarcho-syndicalist tendencies the PT was generally regarded as little more than a front for the Trotskyist PCI.

Its national secretary was Daniel Gluckstein (pseudonym: Seldjouk), who received less than 0.5% in the 2002 French presidential election.

Gérard Schivardi, a candidate in the 2007 presidential elections under the PT, gained 0.34% of the votes. In the 10 and 17 June 2007 French National Assembly elections, the party won no seats. Despite these low national results, the PT polled better in local elections.

The PT published a magazine called Informations Ouvrières (Workers' News).

In June 2008, the PT was dissolved into the new Independent Workers' Party (Parti ouvrier indépendant) from which a faction led by Gluckstein split in 2015 becoming the Democratic Independent Workers' Party (POID), re-taking the name Workers Party in 2023.

== See also ==
- Politics of France
- List of political parties in France

== Related links ==
- Official website
- Informations Ouvrières
- Contreculture.org
