= Daniel Gluckstein =

French Trotskyist politician

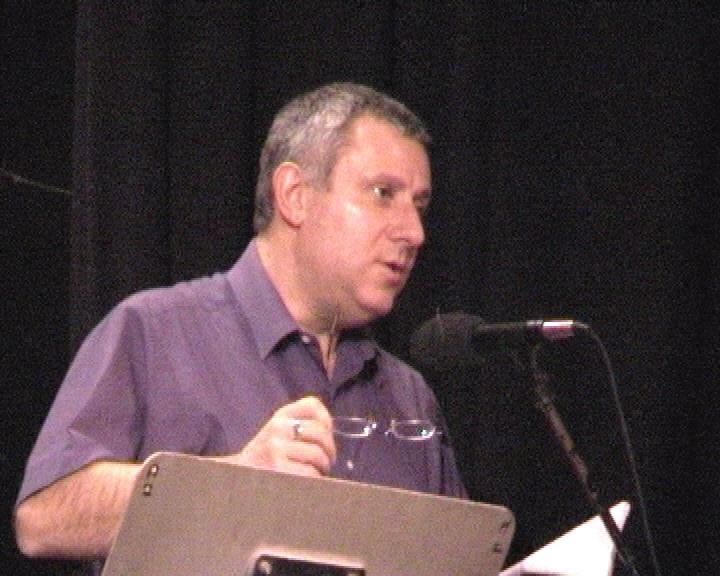
Daniel Gluckstein in Lyon, France (2002)

Daniel Gluckstein (born 3 March 1953 in Paris) is a French Trotskyist politician best known for running in the French presidential election of 2002 as the candidate of the Workers' Party (Parti des Travailleurs, PT).

== Biography ==
In 1968, he joined the Revolutionary Communist Youth (JCR). Then in 1979, he founded the Communist League Internationalist (LCI). In 1991, he was nominated National Secretary of the Parti des Travailleurs. In 1994, as lead candidate of the Parti des Travailleurs for the European elections, he obtained 0.43% of the vote. He was candidate for the legislative elections in Montreuil, Seine-Saint-Denis in 1997. In April 2002, he was candidate in the presidential election, and gained 0.47% of the vote, which made him the last of sixteen candidates in the first round.

In June 2008, he created the Parti Ouvrier Indépendant together with Gérard Schivardi.

In 2015, he co-founded the new Workers' Party.

== Personal life ==
Gluckstein is married, with three children, and is a former professor of history in a professional college. Like many Trotskyist leaders, he has a pseudonym, "Seldjouk".

== Bibliography ==
- Qui dirige ? Personne on s'en charge nous-mêmes, SELIO, 1987
- Discussion autour de lutte des classes et mondialisation. 1990. OCLC 84677125 (with Pierre Lambert)
- Le Fonds monétaire international (F.M.I): Une entreprise de pillage des peuples, SELIO, 1990, 272 pages ISBN 2-906981-13-3
- La Sécu, elle est à nous, SELIO, 1996, 340 pages ISBN 2-906981-18-4
- Luttes des classes et mondialisation: le XXe siècle s'achève : putréfié, sénile, parasitaire, l'impérialisme reste une transition, mais vers quoi ? Paris: SELIO, 1999. ISBN 9782906981201 WorldCat
- Itinéraires. Monaco: Rocher, 2002. ISBN 978-2-268-04233-6 (with Pierre Lambert).
