= André Goustat =

French politician and co-founder of CPNT

Mayor of Mauzac-et-Grand-Castang

Regional Councilor of Aquitaine
- In office 1992–2004

Personal details
- Died: July 27, 2016 France
- Party: CPNT
- Occupation: Politician

André Goustat was a French politician who was the co-founder of CPNT, an agrarianist political party in France. Goustat also served as the mayor of Mauzac-et-Grand-Castang and as the regional councilor of Aquitaine from 1992 to 2004.

== Biography ==
In 1989, he helped found the CPNT political party in France, acting as the chairman for nine years before being charged in 1998 for embezzlement. He led the CPNT in the 1989 and 1994 European Parliament elections in France. After being charged for embezzlement, he handed the role of chairman over to Jean Saint-Josse. Goustat died on July 27, 2016.
