= Workers' Party (France, 2015) =

Workers' Party Parti des travailleurs
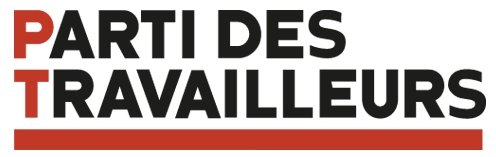
- Leader: Collective leadership
- Founder: Gérard Schivardi, Daniel Gluckstein, Jean Markun
- Founded: November 22, 2015
- Split from: Independent Workers' Party
- Ideology: Communism; Trotskyism; Lambertism; Internationalism; Euroscepticism

Website
- https://parti-des-travailleurs.fr/

The Workers' Party (PT), named the Independent Democratic Workers' Party (POID) until 2023, is a French far-left political party led in particular by Daniel Gluckstein. It was founded in 2015 following a split with the Independent Workers' Party (POI).

== History ==
First logo

The Democratic Independent Workers' Party (POID) emerged from a split from the Independent Workers' Party (POI) in 2015. This was after disagreeing with the majority decisions of its current executive. After having announced that he wanted to create a trend supported by more than 700 members of the Internationalist Communist Current (CCI) and entitled "Return to a policy of party building", Daniel Gluckstein was suspended from the POI, as well as the other members of the leadership national who supported him. The national office removed Gluckstein as well as Gérard Schivardi and Jean Markun from their mandates as national secretaries.

At the end of two separate congresses held on 21 and 22 November 2015, the movement launched by Daniel Gluckstein decided to form itself as a new party named the "Independent Democratic Workers' Party". Gérard Schivardi, Daniel Gluckstein and Jean Markun, the three national secretaries of the POI (Claude Jenet having died at the time of the split), became its national secretaries.

The POID declares itself internationalist and gives its motto "For socialism, the Republic and democracy". The party claimed nearly 2,900 members in 2022. Its weekly newspaper is La Tribune des Travailleurs, which aims to be a "free forum for the class struggle". It claims nearly 7,000 subscribers in June 2023.

The POID aims to continue the activity of the original POI. The party platform indicates:

"The Independent Workers' Party was founded in 2008. Its acronym was confiscated by a fraction of its national office which, in 2015, decided both to give up building it as a party and to expel all of its secretaries nationals, half of the national office. Its continuity today is that of the Independent Democratic Workers' Party"

The party platform also stands for:

- "For socialism", because it aims to put an end to the regime of private ownership of the major means of production and exchange and to replace it with their socialization.
- "For the Republic" one, indivisible and secular, heir to the French Revolution, founded on the existence of more than 36,750 communes and departments and on the separation of Church and State.
- "For democracy", because the emancipation of workers requires the right to free trade union and political organization, the foundation of democracy. This political democracy relies on elected officials, representatives of the people and mandated by them.

Within the party there is a "Trotskyist" current of the Fourth International (ICR).

The POID is part of the International Workers' Committee, whose last world conference in October 2022 brought together representatives from 43 countries.

In December 2023, the POID changed its name to the Workers' Party, in order to distinguish itself from the POI which had campaigned for La France insoumise in 2022. It took the name of the party which preceded the POI, founded in 1991.

== Political positions ==
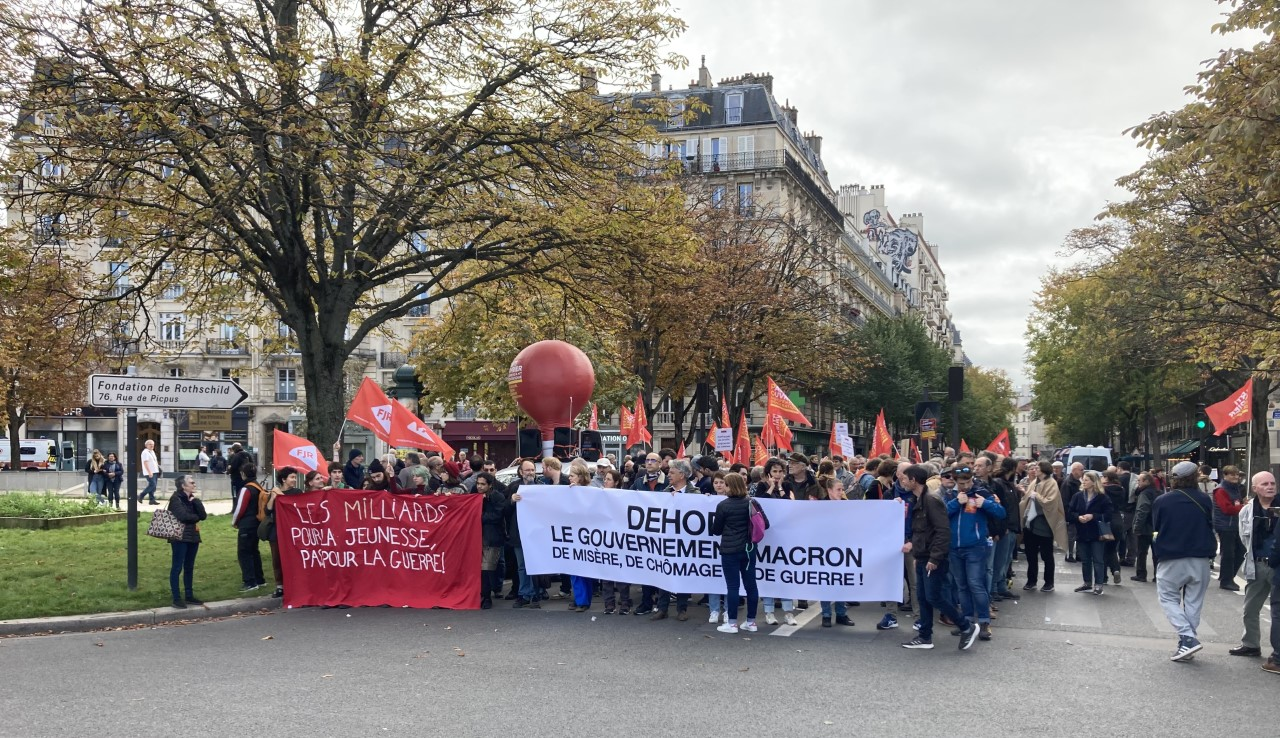
Procession of POID and the Federation of Young Revolutionaries (FJR) at the demonstration against the high cost of living on October 16, 2022, in Paris.

The POID participated in the organization of a movement titled "For the lifting of the state of emergency", on Saturday January 23, 2016. It intends to bring together 1,500 participants at a meeting during which many political and union leaders spoke and organised.

The POID organized a meeting on 28 May 2016 in support of Brexit in the runup to the 2016 United Kingdom European Union membership referendum, with the participation of workers from different European countries.

The POID organized a demonstration "Macron, one year is enough!" on 13 May 2018 in Paris, bringing together 4,000 participants.

From March 2020, the party launched a campaign for the restitution of the 343 billion euros (unanimous vote in the National Assembly on this subject) devoted by the Macron government to aid to businesses, so that they could be used for hospitals, increasing wages and education.

On 5 December 2020, the party participated in the Parisian demonstration entitled "For freedom of the press and the defence of social rights.

In the context of the Russian invasion of Ukraine, the POID is mobilizing "against the war and against the defence budget of Emmanuel Macron". The party calls for "an immediate and unconditional ceasefire in Ukraine including the withdrawal of all foreign troops outside the countries they occupy.

In 2022, the party is leading a campaign in support of Afghan women under the Islamic Emirate of Afghanistan. In 2025, the party is leading a campaign to demand Macron's government to cease any relationship with Israel.

== Elections ==
When it was founded, the POID had elected officials (former POI elected officials) in a certain number of municipalities: mayors, deputies or councillors.

The POID presented 64 candidates in the 2017 legislative elections but none were elected.

The party also stood candidates in the 2021 departmental elections.

In 2022, while the POI joins the Popular Union formed by La France insoumise to tackle the presidential election, then on the occasion of the legislative elections the New Ecological and Social Popular Union (NUPES) supported by his party the POID remained uncommitted. Noting for his part that if he claims power, "at the same time, Jean-Luc Mélenchon undertakes to respect the institutions of the Fifth Republic by cohabiting with Macron (which amounts to "governing" under his control)". The POID stood around a hundred candidates in the elections but achieved weak results.

In 2024, the Workers' Party presents a list for the 2024 European Parliament election in France named "For bread, peace, freedom". It is led by Camille Adoue, a 23-year-old editor. The party gained 4,120 votes (0.02%) and no seats.

The party stood candidates in 58 communes for the 2026 municipal elections. The party gained 11.683 votes and won one seat each in Orthez (337 votes, 6.96%) and Mainvilliers (206 votes, 8,94%).

== Trade Unionism ==
Like the POI, the POID is present in the trade union movement, particularly within the Workers' Force confederation due to the presence of its activists in particular. The two parties are now in conflict within FO since the ousting of Pascal Pavageau, the short-lived successor to Jean-Claude Mailly in 2018. However, the POID's line of conduct is the independence of the party vis-à-vis the unions, and conversely the independence of the unions vis-à-vis the party.

== Legal cases ==
On 17 February 2023, the Paris administrative court rendered a decision favourable to the Independent Democratic Workers' Party, condemning the former Paris Police Prefect Didier Lallement, who had banned a demonstration of this party on June 5, 2021.

== Election results ==
=== European Parliament ===
Election	Leader	Votes	%	Seats	+/−	EP Group
2024	Camille Adoue	4,405	0.02 (#28)	0 / 81	New	−
