= Gérard Schivardi =

French politician (born 1950)

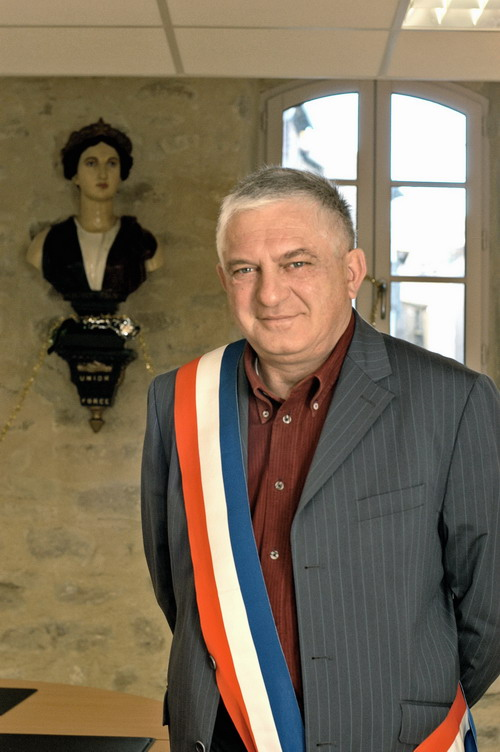
Gérard Schivardi

Gérard Schivardi (born 17 April 1950) is a French politician. He contended in the French presidential election of 2007 under the colours of the Workers' Party (Parti des Travailleurs) of Trotskyist legacy. He came last in the first round of balloting on 22 April, obtaining 0.34% of the popular vote (123,540 votes).

== Biography ==
Schivardi was born in 1950 in Narbonne. He is married and a father of two. Schivardi has been a master craftsman mason since 1970, and is still in activity as of 2007.

From 1973 to 1988, he was president of the syndicate of the masons of Aude.

In 1975 he joined the Socialist party. In 1989, he was elected in the city council of Mailhac; in 1995 he became second deputy mayor. He was elected mayor of Mailhac in 2001. He advocated strong public services and increased power and independence of communes, denouncing what he called the "forced intercommunality".

In 2002, Schivardi met Daniel Gluckstein, who convinced him to support his campaign.

In July 2003 he was elected representative of the Canton of Ginestas and resigned form the Socialist Party. He then turned "Independent socialist", and was not a member of a political party afterwards, until he joined the Independent Workers' Party (POI) in 2008.

On 20 September 2003 he took position against the Treaty establishing a Constitution for Europe and founded the "Comité national pour la victoire du vote NON" ("National committee for victory of NO votes").

In 2004, he founded the "National Committee for Defense of Communes and Public Services" (Comité de défense des communes et des services publics).

On 18 November, he was selected as candidate supported by a "Comité National pour la reconquête de la démocratie" ("National Committee for reconquest of Democracy").

On 16 March 2008 he was re-elected as mayor of Mailhac, Aude.

== French presidential election of 2007 ==
Schivardi was one of the twelve candidates for the 2007 French presidential election. He was the first "small" candidate to obtain the 500 sponsorships from elected officials which are necessary to become an official candidate.

Schivardi claimed to be an "authentic socialist, independent and no affiliate". He attempted to run as "the mayors' candidate" (le candidat des maires), but was barred from doing so after the prime association of French mayors, the Association des Maires de France, obtained an injunction against Schivardi. A similar decision was reached by the commission overseeing the "official campaign" of the election; an appeal against this decision was rejected by the Constitutional Council. Schivardi then changed his slogan to candidat de maires, which may be translated as "candidate of some mayors".

The key proposal of Schivardi's programme was that France should withdraw from the European Union and construct a "Europe of free people and free nations". Several proposals in Schivardi's program, including the election of a new national assembly to suppress the French Fifth Republic's institutions, echo those of Daniel Gluckstein in 2002.

In addition to his far-left-wing base of syndicalists and Workers' Party militants, Schivardi was supported by some mayors affiliated of the Socialist Party, French Communist Party, Union for a Popular Movement or Union for French Democracy, who don't support the communal policy of their parties.

Schivardi's official site and documentation said that he was supported by the Workers' Party, but he denied being a member of that party, or a trotskyist.

== Since 2015 ==
In 2015, he co-founded the Workers' Party.
