= Rurality Movement =

Agrarianist political party in France

Rurality Movement French: Le Mouvement de la ruralité
- Leader: Eddie Puyjalon
- Founded: 1989
- Headquarters: BP 87546 64075 Pau
- Ideology: Agrarianism; Alter-globalism; Euroscepticism
- Political position: Right-wing
- European affiliation: Libertas (2009/2010)
- Colours: Green and blue
- Seats in the National Assembly: 0 / 577
- Seats in the Senate: 0 / 343
- Seats in the European Parliament: 0 / 72

Website
- www.lemouvrural.fr

Old logo of the party under its former name

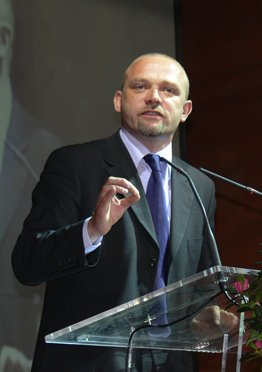
Frédéric Nihous, 2007 presidential candidate

The Rurality Movement (French: Le Mouvement de la ruralité [lə muvmɑ̃ d(ə) la ʁyʁalite]; LMR [ɛl ɛm ɛʁ]), formerly Hunting, Fishing, Nature and Traditions (French: Chasse, pêche, nature et traditions [ʃas pɛʃ natyʁ e tʁadisjɔ̃]; CPNT [se pe ɛn te]), is an agrarianist political party in France which aims to defend the traditional values of rural France. Its leader is Eddie Puyjalon. The party states it is neither right nor left but represents rural people on the whole in their diversity.

The party was a member of the presidential majority of Nicolas Sarkozy.

== History ==
Formed in 1985, it contested both the European elections of 1989 and 1994 without success. In 1999, it obtained six seats, led by Jean Saint-Josse who was at the top of the list. It lost all representation at the following election to the European Parliament in 2004, when it obtained less than the minimum 3% of votes that allow a party to be reimbursed for campaign expenses. Consequently, it faced a deficit of 300,000 euros. At one stage, it had 32 regional councillors, but lost all of them in that same year. After these problems, most members of the CPNT have joined the Union for a Popular Movement (UMP) or the Movement for France, but the party is still in existence, and nominated Frédéric Nihous, a hunter from Northern France, as a candidate in the Presidential election of 2007. Nihous won 1.15% of votes only, much lower than Jean Saint-Josse in 2002.

In the 2009 European Parliament election, the party ran as the junior partner of the Movement for France under the etiquette of the Libertas political movement led by Irish businessman Declan Ganley. They won 4.8% of the vote, but only one seat, that of MPF leader Philippe de Villiers.

In August 2009, CPNT President Frédéric Nihous announced interest in joining the Liaison Committee for the Presidential Majority, which co-ordinates the parties which support the policies of President Nicolas Sarkozy.

After the standing down of Frédéric Nihous in March 2016, Eddie Puyjalon assumed the leadership of the party.

== Presidents ==
- André Goustat (1989–1998)
- Jean Saint-Josse (1998–2008)
- Frédéric Nihous (2008–2016)
- Eddie Puyjalon (2016– )

== Popular support and electoral record ==
CPNT is strong in certain rural areas of France with an important community of hunters. It is strong in the Somme River estuary to the west of Abbeville, in the Manche department and the Gironde department. In the 1999 European election, CPNT won 25% of the vote in the Somme, 15.4% in the Manche, 15.2% in the Landes department and 11.9% in Gironde. In stark contrast, the party barely won 1% of the vote that year in the Alsatian department of Bas-Rhin and did poorly in the east of France, much more industrialized and much less agrarian.

CPNT has three general councillors: one in the Somme, one in Gironde and one in the Hérault department.

=== Presidential ===
President of the French Republic
Election	Candidate	First round		Second round		Result
Election	Candidate	Votes	%	Votes	%	Result
2002	Jean Saint-Josse	1,204,863	4.23%	-	-	Lost
2007	Frédéric Nihous	420,645	1.15%	-	-	Lost

=== Legislative ===
French National Assembly
Election year	# of 1st round votes	% of 1st round vote	# of 2nd round votes	% of 2nd round vote	# of seats
2002	422,448	1.67%	—	—	0
2007	213,427	0.82%	—	—	0

=== European Parliament ===
European Parliament
Election year	# of votes	% of overall vote	# of seats won
1989	749,741	4.13%	0
1994	771,061	3.96%	0
1999	1,195,727	6.77%	6
2004	297,389	1.73%	0
2009	826,357	4.80%	0

== See also ==
- Category:Hunting, Fishing, Nature and Traditions politicians
- Jean Saint-Josse
- Frédéric Nihous
- Hunting – Fishing – Environment, similar party in Italy
- Outdoor Recreation New Zealand, similar party in New Zealand
- Outdoor Recreation Party, similar party in Australia
- Party of Greek Hunters, similar party in Greece
- Rural Alliance, a similar list in 2024
- Shooters, Fishers and Farmers Party, similar party in Australia
