= Frédéric Nihous =

French politician (born 1967)

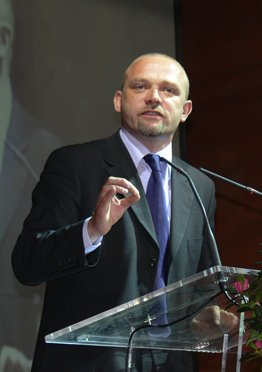
Frédéric Nihous during the 2007 presidential campaign

Frédéric Nihous (born 15 August 1967) is a French politician from the Hunting, Fishing, Nature, Traditions (CPNT) party. He was a candidate for the 2007 French presidential election, but was eliminated in the first round of balloting. He was second to last, with 1.15% of votes (420 645 votes).

Born in Valenciennes, his origins are in Nord-Pas-de-Calais, in Northern France, but he lives in the Pyrénées Atlantiques, in south-western France. He was the Secretary General for CPNT starting in 1999 in the European Parliament. In 2002 he was the director of the presidential campaign of Jean Saint-Josse (founder of CPNT). After the election he became the parliamentary assistant to Saint-Josse, and controlled the political direction of the party.

He is married and a father of two.
