= Jean Saint-Josse =

French politician (born 1944)

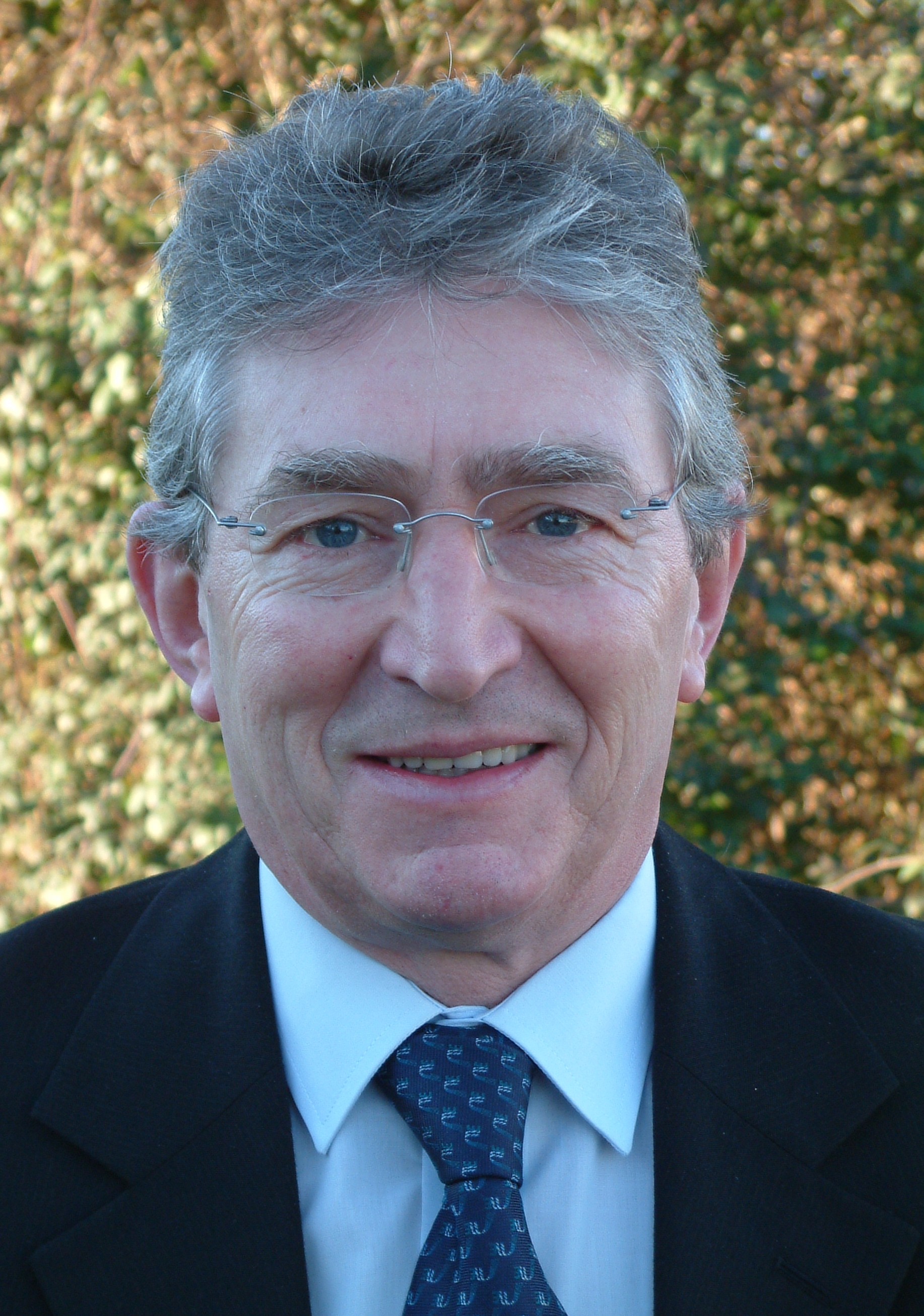
- Jean Saint-Josse in 2003

Mayor of Coarraze
- In office 16 June 1995 – 26 May 2020
- Preceded by: Jean Penouil
- Succeeded by: Michel Lucante

Member of the European Parliament
- In office 1999–2004

President of Hunt, Fish, Nature, Traditions
- In office 1998–2008
- Preceded by: André Goustat
- Succeeded by: Frédéric Nihous

Personal details
- Born: 22 March 1944 (age 82) Coarraze, France
- Party: RPR; Hunting, Fishing, Nature and Traditions
- Children: 4

Jean Saint-Josse (French pronunciation: [ʒɑ̃ sɛ̃ ʒɔs]; born 22 March 1944 in Coarraze, Pyrénées-Atlantiques) is a French politician and former member of the Rally for the Republic (RPR), he was the leader of the ruralist Hunting, Fishing, Nature and Traditions (CPNT) party until 2008.

In the 2002 presidential election he won 4.23% as candidate of CPNT. He is a former Member of the European Parliament (MEP).
