= Independent Workers' Party =

French Marxist political party founded in June 2008

Independent Workers' Party Parti ouvrier indépendant
- Leader: Collective leadership (Central Committee)
- Founded: 15 June 2008; 17 years ago
- Preceded by: Workers' Party
- Headquarters: 87, Rue du Faubourg-Saint-Denis, Paris
- Membership: 10,071
- Ideology: Marxism; Proletarian internationalism Factions: Communism; Trotskyism; Anarcho-syndicalism
- Political position: Left-wing to far-left
- National affiliation: New Popular Front (2024–present); New Ecologic and Social People's Union (2022–2024)
- Colours: Red and black
- National Assembly: 1 / 577
- Senate: 0 / 348
- European Parliament: 0 / 79

Party flag

Website
- partiouvrierindependant-poi.fr

The Independent Workers' Party (French: Parti ouvrier indépendant, POI) is a French Marxist political party founded in June 2008 after the dissolution of its predecessor, the Workers' Party. It claimed 10,071 members at its founding congress in 2008, and 8,000 members on its second congress in 2012.

Amongst its four General Secretaries are former presidential candidates Gérard Schivardi and Daniel Gluckstein, who were members of a Trotskyist current within the party. Gluckstein was suspended following a leadership dispute in 2015, leading to the faction splitting and founding the Workers' Party.

Jérôme Legavre was elected the party's only Member of Parliament in the 2022 French legislative election.

== Election results ==
=== European Parliament ===
Election	Leader	Votes	%	Seats	+/−	EP Group
2024 (Note: Run in a joint list with LFI, REV, GES, Péyi-A and PLR, that won 9 seats in total.)	Manon Aubry	2,432,976	9.87 (#4)	0 / 81	New	−

== See also ==
- Politics of France
- List of political parties in France
