= Opinion polling for the 2002 French legislative election =

This page lists public opinion polls conducted for the 2002 French legislative elections, which were held in two rounds on 9 and 16 June 2002.

Unless otherwise noted, all polls listed below are compliant with the regulations of the national polling commission (Commission nationale des sondages) and utilize the quota method.

== Graphical summary ==
The averages in the graphs below were constructed using polls listed below conducted by the six major French pollsters. The graphs are smoothed 14-day weighted moving averages, using only the most recent poll conducted by any given pollster within that range (each poll weighted based on recency).

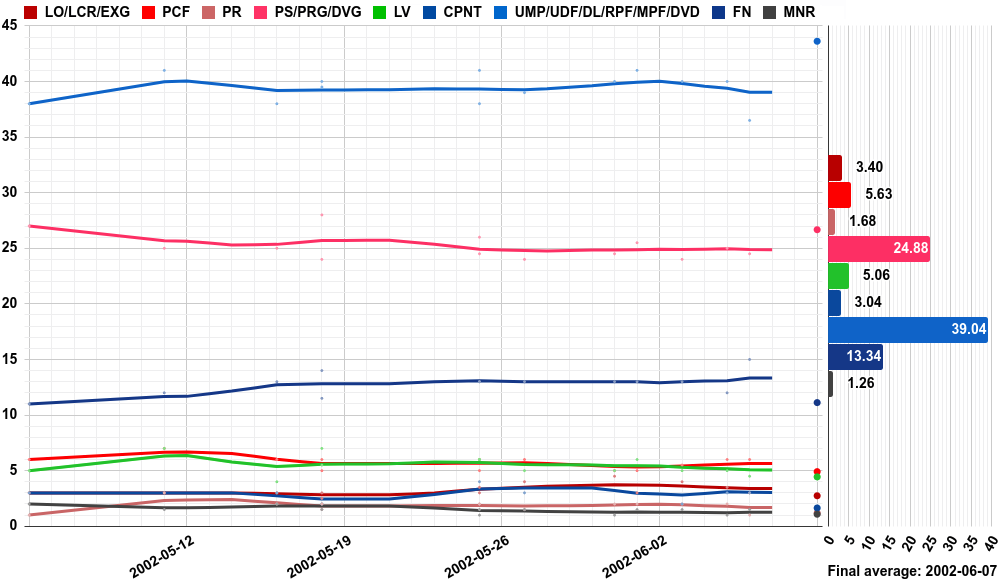

== First round ==
The BVA poll conducted in October 1998 tested Ecology Generation (GE).

The Ipsos poll of 125 constituencies was conducted in seven categories of constituencies: 36 constituencies with left-right duels narrowly won by the left in 1997 with a weak performance of the FN in 2002, 10 constituencies with left-right duels narrowly won by the left in 1997 with the possibility of the FN advancing to the second round in 2002, 21 constituencies with triangulaires in 1997 with the FN narrowly won by the left, 4 constituencies with left-FN duels won by the left in 1997 where the right improved upon its score and could this advance to the second round in 2002, 34 constituencies with left-right duels narrowly won by the right in 1997 with a weak performance of the FN in 2002, 7 constituencies with left-right duels narrowly won by the right in 1997 with the possibility of the FN advancing to the second round in 2002, and 13 constituencies with triangulaires in 1997 with the FN narrowly won by the right.

Polling firm	Fieldwork date	Sample size	Abs.	LO	LCR	EXG	PCF	PR/ MDC	PS	PRG/ MRG	DVG	LV	ECO	CPNT	UDF	UMP/ RPR	DL	DVD	RPF	MPF	FN	MNR/ MN	EXD	REG	DIV
2002 election	9 Jun 2002	–	35.58%	1.18%	1.24%	0.32%	4.91%	1.19%	23.78%	1.51%	1.38%	4.44%	1.15%	1.64%	4.79%	33.37%	0.42%	3.89%	0.36%	0.79%	11.12%	1.08%	0.25%	0.36%	0.84%
CSA	5–6 Jun 2002	1,004	–	3%			6%	1%	24.5%		–	4.5%	–	3%	4%	29%		2%	1.5%		15%	1.5%	–	–	5%
Ipsos	5 Jun 2002	1,014	–	3.5%			6%	2%	25%			5%	1%	3%	4%	32%		4%	–	–	12%	1%	–	–	1.5%
Ipsos	31 May–3 Jun 2002	1,869	–	4%			5.5%	2%	24%			5%	1%	2%	4.5%	32%		3.5%	–	–	13%	1.5%	–	–	2%
Sofres	31 May–1 Jun 2002	1,000	–	3%			5%	2%	25.5%			6%	–	–	5%	31%		5%			13%	1.5%	–	–	3%
Ifop	30–31 May 2002	950	–	4.5%			5%	2%	24.5%		–	5%	1%	–	36%			4%	–	–	13%	1%	–	–	4%
Ipsos	24–27 May 2002	1,816	–	4%			6%	1.5%	24%			5%	1%	3%	4%	32%		3%	–	–	13%	1.5%	–	–	2%
Sofres	24–25 May 2002	1,000	–	3.5%			5%	2%	24.5%			6%	–	–	4%	34%		3%			13%	1.5%	–	–	3.5%
BVA	23–25 May 2002	667	–	3%			6%	2%	26%			6%	1%	4%	6%	27%		5%	–	–	13%	1%	–	–	–
Ipsos	17–18 May 2002	951	–	3%			6%	1.5%	24%			7%	0.5%	2%	4%	35%		1%	–	–	14%	2%	–	–	–
Sofres	17–18 May 2002	1,000	–	2.5%			5%	2%	28%			5.5%	–	–	5%	31%		3.5%			11.5%	1.5%	–	–	4.5%
CSA	15–16 May 2002	1,005	–	3%			6%	2%	25%		–	4%	–	3%	35%			–	3%		13%	2%	–	–	4%
Ipsos	10–11 May 2002	894	–	3%			7%	3%	25%			7%	0.5%	–	41%				–	–	12%	1.5%	–	–	–
CSA	5 May 2002	1,004	–	3%			6%	1%	27%		–	5%	–	3%	35%			–	3%		11%	2%	–	–	4%
BVA	28–30 Mar 2002	684	–	7%			7%	–	28%			6%	3%	–	5%	23%	4%	–	2%	–	15%		–	–	–
BVA	28 Feb–2 Mar 2002	708	–	7%			7%	–	30%			5%	3%	–	5%	24%	3%	–	3%	–	13%		–	–	–
Louis Harris	1–2 Feb 2002	844	–	8%			6%	–	28%			11%	4%	–	9%	18%	6%	–	1%	–	9%		–	–	–
BVA	31 Jan–2 Feb 2002	821	–	6.5%			6.5%	–	28%			6%	4%	–	6%	22%	4%	–	4%	–	13%		–	–	–
Louis Harris	4–5 Jan 2002	1,003	–	7%			6%	–	28%			10%	5%	–	7%	22%	3%	–	2%	–	10%		–	–	–
BVA	2–5 Jan 2002	720	–	6%			6%	–	30%			9%	3%	–	6%	21%	4%	–	4%	–	11%		–	–	–
BVA	29 Nov–1 Dec 2001	653	–	4%			7%	–	27%			10%	4%	–	4%	23%	4%	–	4%	–	13%		–	–	–
BVA	25–27 Oct 2001	661	–	6%			6%	–	27%			10%	2%	–	5%	25%	3%	–	4%	–	12%		–	–	–
BVA	27–29 Sep 2001	764	–	5%			7%	–	28%			8%	3%	–	6%	22%	4%	–	4%	–	13%		–	–	–
BVA	30 Aug–1 Sep 2001	678	–	6%			6%	–	28%			9%	4%	–	7%	22%	4%	–	5%	–	9%		–	–	–
BVA	5–7 Jul 2001	917	–	6%			8%	–	31%			8%	5%	–	6%	21%	3%	–	3%	–	9%		–	–	–
BVA	14–16 Jun 2001	682	–	7%			7%	–	30%			9%	3%	–	6%	20%	3%	–	6%	–	9%		–	–	–
BVA	10–12 May 2001	645	–	5%			8%	–	29%			10%	4%	–	7%	21%	3%	–	4%	–	9%		–	–	–
BVA	20–21 Apr 2001	738	–	5%			7%	–	28%			12%	3%	–	7%	20%	4%	–	4%	–	10%		–	–	–
BVA	22–24 Mar 2001	647	–	6%			6%	–	31%			10%	3%	–	7%	22%	4%	–	3%	–	8%		–	–	–
BVA	22–24 Feb 2001	634	–	6%			8%	–	30%			8%	4%	–	6.5%	20%	3.5%	–	4%	–	10%		–	–	–
BVA	1–3 Feb 2001	642	–	5%			8%	–	32%			7%	2%	–	6.5%	24%	3.5%	–	4%	–	8%		–	–	–
BVA	11–13 Jan 2001	621	–	5%			8%	–	31%			6%	3%	–	7%	21%	3%	–	4%	–	12%		–	–	–
BVA	30 Nov–2 Dec 2000	945	–	6.5%			7.5%	–	29%			8%	3%	–	6.5%	19%	4%	–	6%	–	10.5%		–	–	–
Ifop	27 Nov 2000	803	–	3%			8%	–	27%			14%		–	27%		–	8%	–	–	10%	–	–	–	3%
BVA	8–10 Nov 2000	615	–	7%			7%	–	30%			7%	3%	–	7.5%	22%	2.5%	–	4%	–	10%		–	–	–
BVA	6–8 Oct 2000	601	–	5%			7%	–	28%			7%	3%	–	6%	22%	4%	–	7%	–	11%		–	–	–
BVA	7–9 Sep 2000	577	–	7%			8%	–	24%			7.5%	4%	–	7%	21%	3.5%	–	8%	–	10%		–	–	–
BVA	20–22 Jul 2000	681	–	6%			8%	–	26%			7%	3%	–	6%	23%	4%	–	7.5%	–	9.5%		–	–	–
BVA	15–17 Jun 2000	629	–	4.5%			7%	–	29%			7%	4%	–	6.5%	23%	3%	–	8%	–	8%		–	–	–
BVA	11–13 May 2000	687	–	5%			9%	–	27%			6%	4%	–	8%	21%	4%	–	9%	–	7%		–	–	–
Ipsos	28–29 Apr 2000	825	–	3%			9%	–	29%		–	8%	–	–	36%			–	4%	–	9%	2%	–	–	–
BVA	13–15 Apr 2000	505	–	4.5%			8.5%	–	28%			7%	3%	–	8%	20%	3%	–	10%	–	8%		–	–	–
BVA	16–18 Mar 2000	621	–	5%			9%	–	27%			7%	4%	–	8%	17%	3%	–	11%	–	9%		–	–	–
Ipsos	10–11 Mar 2000	920	–	3%			8%	–	29%		–	9%	–	–	35%			–	6%	–	8%	2%	–	–	–
BVA	17–19 Feb 2000	599	–	5%			8%	–	28.5%			6.5%	5%	–	8%	17.5%	3%	–	9.5%	–	9%		–	–	–
BVA	13–15 Jan 2000	546	–	5.5%			9.5%	–	26%			7%	2.5%	–	7%	18.5%	2.5%	–	11.5%	–	10%		–	–	–
Sofres	27–29 Dec 1999	995	–	2%			9%	–	29%			8%	3%	–	25%			–	12%	–	10%	–	–	–	2%
BVA	9–11 Dec 1999	601	–	6.5%			9%	–	26%			8%	3%	–	8%	19%	3%	–	9.5%	–	8%		–	–	–
BVA	18–20 Nov 1999	926	–	5%			9%	–	28%			6%	2%	–	9%	17%	4%	–	9%	–	11%		–	–	–
BVA	14–16 Oct 1999	608	–	6%			9%	–	26%			6%	2%	–	8%	16%	3%	–	11%	–	13%		–	–	–
BVA	16–18 Sep 1999	673	–	5.5%			8%	–	26%			7%	3.5%	–	6%	17%	3%	–	12%	–	12%		–	–	–
BVA	15–17 Jul 1999	599	–	6%			7%	27%			–	7%	3%	–	8%	15%	3%	–	14%	–	10%		–	–	–
BVA	17–19 Jun 1999	648	–	6%			8%	27%			–	10%	3%	–	9%	11%	3%	–	16%	–	7%		–	–	–
BVA	11–13 Mar 1999	609	–	6%			8%	–	26%		–	8%	2%	–	7%	22%	6%	–	–	–	15%	–	–	–	–
BVA	14–16 Jan 1999	688	–	5%			8%	–	29%			7%	2%	–	7%	24%	4%	–	–	–	14%	–	–	–	–
BVA	10–13 Dec 1998	589	–	5%			8%	–	29%			7%	3%	–	7%	24%	6%	–	–	–	11%	–	–	–	–
BVA	19–21 Nov 1998	643	–	5%			9%	–	30%			6%	3%	–	7%	22%	5%	–	–	–	13%	–	–	–	–
BVA	15–17 Oct 1998	928	–	5%			8%	–	31%		–	5%	4%	–	8%	19%	5%	–	–	–	15%	–	–	–	–
CSA	27–28 Mar 1998	1,005	–	3.5%			9%	32%				5%	3%	–	8%	18%	–	5.5%	–	–	15%	–	–	–	1%
1997 election	25 May 1997	–	32.08%	(EXG)	(EXG)	2.52%	9.94%	(DVG)	23.53%	1.45%	2.81%	(ECO)	6.81%	–	14.19%	15.69%	–	6.63%	–	(DVD)	14.94%	–	0.10%	(DIV)	1.39%

In 125 constituencies

Polling firm	Fieldwork date	Sample size	LO	LCR	EXG	PCF	PR/ MDC	PS	PRG	DVG	LV	ECO	UDF	UMP/ RPR	DL	DVD	FN	MNR
Ipsos	10–13 May 2002	689	3%			5%	3%	24%			6%	1%	42%				14%	2%

== Second round seat projections ==
Projections marked with an asterisk (*) are for 555 deputies representing metropolitan France. The Ipsos projection on 12 June was constructed using interviews in 198 constituencies where the outcome appeared uncertain.

Polling firm	Fieldwork date	Sample size	Abs.	PCF	PS	PRG	DVG	LV	UDF	UMP	DL	DVD	RPF	MPF	FN	MNR	REG	DIV
2002 election	16 Jun 2002	–	39.69%	21	140	7	6	3	29	355	2	9	2	1	0	0	1	1
Ipsos*	12 Jun 2002	1,022	–	14–22	115–145			1–5	24–30	384–414					0	–	–	–
CSA	5–6 Jun 2002	1,004	–	16–26	140–196				350–410						0–2		–	3–11
Ipsos*	5 Jun 2002	1,014	–	174–216					339–381						0–4		–	–
Ipsos*	31 May–3 Jun 2002	1,869	–	158–196					359–397						0–4		–	–
Sofres*	31 May–1 Jun 2002	1,000	–	164–238					316–388						0–4		–	–
Ipsos*	24–27 May 2002	1,816	–	167–208					347–388						0–4		–	–
Sofres*	24–25 May 2002	1,000	–	155–207					348–400						0	–	–	–
Sofres*	17–18 May 2002	1,000	–	198–238					306–372						0	–	–	–
1997 election	1 Jun 1997	–	29.03%	38	241	12	21	7	106	132	–	13	–	(DVD)	1	0	0	1

== By second round configuration ==
The Ipsos poll of 125 constituencies was conducted in seven categories of constituencies: 36 constituencies with left-right duels narrowly won by the left in 1997 with a weak performance of the FN in 2002, 10 constituencies with left-right duels narrowly won by the left in 1997 with the possibility of the FN advancing to the second round in 2002, 21 constituencies with triangulaires in 1997 with the FN narrowly won by the left, 4 constituencies with left-FN duels won by the left in 1997 where the right improved upon its score and could this advance to the second round in 2002, 34 constituencies with left-right duels narrowly won by the right in 1997 with a weak performance of the FN in 2002, 7 constituencies with left-right duels narrowly won by the right in 1997 with the possibility of the FN advancing to the second round in 2002, and 13 constituencies with triangulaires in 1997 with the FN narrowly won by the right.

Older values provided by Ipsos in 198 uncertain constituencies were constructed using older national polls conducted by the pollster.

=== PS/PCF/LV–UMP/UDF ===
Ifop specifically named the PS and UMP. Sofres specifically named the PCF, PS, and LV, and the UMP (UDF, RPR, and DVD). In 2000, Ipsos specifically named the PS, PCF, and LV, and the RPR, UDF, and DL. In the polls conducted from 10 to 11 May 2002 and of 198 constituencies, Ipsos specifically named the PS, PCF, and LV, and the RPR, UDF, and DL. Thereafter, Ipsos specifically named the PS, PCF, and LV, and the UMP and UDF.

Polling firm	Fieldwork date	Sample size	PS/ PCF/LV	UMP/ UDF
Ifop	6–7 Jun 2002	945	44%	56%
Ipsos	5 Jun 2002	1,014	48%	52%
Ipsos	31 May–3 Jun 2002	1,869	47%	53%
Sofres	31 May–1 Jun 2002	1,000	46%	54%
Ipsos	24–27 May 2002	1,816	47%	53%
Sofres	24–25 May 2002	1,000	45%	55%
Ipsos	17–18 May 2002	951	45%	55%
Sofres	17–18 May 2002	1,000	48.5%	51.5%
Ipsos	10–11 May 2002	894	47%	53%
Ipsos	28–29 Apr 2000	825	51%	49%
Ipsos	10–11 Mar 2000	920	50%	50%

In 198 constituencies

Polling firm	Fieldwork date	Sample size	PS/ PCF/LV	UMP/ UDF
Ipsos	12 Jun 2002	1,022	47%	53%
Ipsos	9 Jun 2002	–	48%	52%
Ipsos	5 Jun 2002	–	50%	50%
Ipsos	31 May–3 Jun 2002	–	51%	49%

In 125 constituencies

Polling firm	Fieldwork date	Sample size	PS/ PCF/LV	UMP/ UDF
Ipsos	10–13 May 2002	689	45%	55%

=== PS/PCF/LV–UMP/UDF–FN ===
Ifop specifically named the PS, UMP, and FN. Sofres specifically named the PCF, PS, and LV; the UMP (UDF, RPR, and DVD); and the FN and MNR. In the polls conducted from 10 to 11 May 2002 and of 198 constituencies, Ipsos specifically named the PS, PCF, and LV; the RPR, UDF, and DL; and the FN. Thereafter, Ipsos specifically named the PS, PCF, and LV; the UMP and UDF; and the FN.

Ipsos polls, denoted with an asterisk (*), only tested this scenario in constituencies where Jean-Marie Le Pen and Bruno Mégret together obtained at least 12.5% of the vote in the preceding presidential election.

Polling firm	Fieldwork date	Sample size	PS/ PCF/LV	UMP/ UDF	FN
Ifop	6–7 Jun 2002	945	41%	45%	14%
Ipsos*	5 Jun 2002	1,014	39%	45%	16%
Ipsos*	31 May–3 Jun 2002	1,869	40%	44%	16%
Sofres	31 May–1 Jun 2002	1,000	43%	45%	12%
Ipsos*	24–27 May 2002	1,816	39%	44%	17%
Sofres	24–25 May 2002	1,000	41%	47%	12%
Ipsos*	17–18 May 2002	951	38%	45%	17%
Sofres	17–18 May 2002	1,000	44%	45%	11%
Ipsos*	10–11 May 2002	894	40%	46%	14%

In 79 of 125 constituencies

Polling firm	Fieldwork date	Sample size	PS/ PCF/LV	UMP/ UDF	FN
Ipsos	10–13 May 2002	689	40%	44%	16%

=== UMP–FN ===
Polling firm	Fieldwork date	Sample size	UMP	FN
Ifop	6–7 Jun 2002	945	86%	14%

=== PS–FN ===
Polling firm	Fieldwork date	Sample size	PS	FN
Ifop	6–7 Jun 2002	945	79%	21%

== By constituency ==
=== First round ===
==== Bouches-du-Rhône's 1st ====
Polling firm	Fieldwork date	Sample size	Abs.	Mireille Mavrides PCF	Marie-Arlette Carlotti PS	Roger Guichard PR	Roland Blum UMP–DL	Marie-Claude Aucouturier FN	Pascal Munier MNR	Others
2002 election	9 Jun 2002	–	35.92%	4.24%	25.92%	0.84%	39.89%	18.88%	1.98%	8.25%
Sofres	17–18 May 2002	500	–	2%	27%	4%	40%	15%	4%	8%

==== Bouches-du-Rhône's 3rd ====
Polling firm	Fieldwork date	Sample size	Abs.	Jean-Paul Nostriano PCF	Gabriel Malauzat PS	Philippe Sanmarco DVG	Yannick Lopez LV	Jean Roatta UMP–DL	Jackie Blanc FN	Nicole Cantrel MNR	Others
2002 election	9 Jun 2002	–	38.78%	4.76%	21.81%	5.02%	2.38%	36.28%	18.80%	1.70%	9.26%
Sofres	17–18 May 2002	500	–	4%	23%	4%	5%	36%	14%	6%	8%

==== Bouches-du-Rhône's 4th ====
Polling firm	Fieldwork date	Sample size	Abs.	Sylvie Moyen LO	Frédéric Dutoit PCF	Patrick Mennucci PS	Karim Zéribi PR	François Franceschi UMP–RPF	Jean-Pierre Baumann FN	Hubert Savon MNR	Others
2002 election	9 Jun 2002	–	43.60%	0.77%	25.86%	17.96%	4.28%	16.60%	24.44%	3.83%	6.27%
CSA	27–28 May 2002	500	–	5%	19%	22%	3%	11%	26%	5%	9%

==== Bouches-du-Rhône's 5th ====
Polling firm	Fieldwork date	Sample size	Abs.	Marie-Yves Le Dret PCF	David Gomes DVG	Jean-Luc Bennahmias LV–PS	Renaud Muselier UMP–RPR	Marie-Odile Rayé FN	Others
2002 election	9 Jun 2002	–	36.88%	5.39%	6.03%	16.97%	42.82%	18.14%	10.65%
Sofres	17–18 May 2002	500	–	4.5%	–	23%	44%	16%	12.5%

==== Bouches-du-Rhône's 8th ====
Polling firm	Fieldwork date	Sample size	Abs.	Christophe Masse PS–PCF	Jacques Rocca Serra UDF–UMP	Stéphane Durbec FN	Others
2002 election	9 Jun 2002	–	37.94%	35.66%	26.81%	21.09%	16.44%
Sofres	17–18 May 2002	500	–	33%	29%	21.5%	16.5%

==== Pyrénées-Atlantiques's 2nd ====
Polling firm	Fieldwork date	Sample size	Abs.	Georges Labazée PS	Jean Saint-Josse CPNT	François Bayrou UDF	Marie-France Galvez FN	Others
2002 election	9 Jun 2002	–	28.14%	31.41%	9.43%	41.79%	6.59%	10.76%
CSA	3–4 Jun 2002	502	–	29%	14%	36.5%	10%	10.5%

==== Paris's 11th ====
Polling firm	Fieldwork date	Sample size	Abs.	Yves Cochet LV–PS	Dominique Versini UMP	Yves Ogé UDF	Nicole Catala DVD	Yves de Coatgoureden FN	Others
2002 election	9 Jun 2002	–	28.70%	38.07%	24.94%	4.85%	13.71%	6.21%	12.22%
CSA	31 May–1 Jun 2002	502	–	39%	21%	2%	19%	6%	13%

==== Paris's 16th ====
Bernard Pons was eligible to continue to the second round, but instead announced his retirement from politics after the first round, allowing Françoise de Panafieu to win unopposed on 16 June 2002.

Polling firm	Fieldwork date	Sample size	Abs.	Nelly Oehlhaffen PS	Atanase Périfan DVD	Françoise de Panafieu DVD	Bernard Pons UMP	Danièle Lançon FN	Others
2002 election	9 Jun 2002	–	29.36%	15.55%	4.99%	40.83%	22.34%	6.10%	10.18%
CSA	27–29 May 2002	501	–	13%	2.5%	40%	24%	9%	11.5%

==== Tarn-et-Garonne's 1st ====
Polling firm	Fieldwork date	Sample size	Abs.	Joëlle Greder PCF	Roland Garrigues PS	Philippe Debaigt LV	Thierry Cabanes CPNT	Brigitte Barèges UMP	Liliane Garcia FN	Others
2002 election	9 Jun 2002	–	27.56%	2.22%	32.35%	2.56%	3.59%	38.95%	12.03%	8.30%
CSA	3–4 Jun 2002	500	–	4%	31%	4%	5%	36%	12%	8%

==== Vaucluse's 4th ====
Jean-Pierre Lambertin was eligible to continue through to the second round, but instead withdrew his candidacy.

Polling firm	Fieldwork date	Sample size	Abs.	Jean-Pierre Lambertin PS–PCF–LV	Thierry Mariani UMP	Jacques Bompard FN	Others
2002 election	9 Jun 2002	–	29.74%	25.06%	35.23%	34.06%	5.65%
CSA	29–30 May 2002	539	–	27%	33%	32%	8%

==== Essonne's 1st ====
Polling firm	Fieldwork date	Sample size	Abs.	Bruno Piriou PCF	Manuel Valls PS	Jacques Picard LV	Serge Dassault UMP	Gaëtan de Fresnoye FN	Others
2002 election	9 Jun 2002	–	38.84%	4.60%	36.34%	3.52%	35.95%	11.20%	8.39%
CSA	30 May 2002	501	–	7%	28%	8%	30%	14%	13%

==== Seine-Saint-Denis's 9th ====
Polling firm	Fieldwork date	Sample size	Abs.	Gilles Garnier PCF	Élisabeth Guigou PS	Anne Déo LV	Nicole Rivoire UDF	Georgia Vincent UMP	Marie-Estelle Préjean FN	Others
2002 election	9 Jun 2002	–	38.62%	10.22%	33.90%	4.62%	0.00%	26.59%	15.36%	9.32%
CSA	3–4 Jun 2002	500	–	9%	36%	6%	5%	16%	15%	13%

==== Val-d'Oise's 5th ====
Polling firm	Fieldwork date	Sample size	Abs.	Robert Hue PCF–PS–LV	Georges Mothron UMP	Micheline Bruna FN	Others
2002 election	9 Jun 2002	–	39.24%	38.63%	35.53%	14.38%	11.47%
CSA	25–29 May 2002	501	–	36%	35%	15%	14%

=== Second round ===
==== Bouches-du-Rhône's 1st ====
Polling firm	Fieldwork date	Sample size	Abs.	Marie-Arlette Carlotti PS	Roland Blum UMP–DL	Marie-Claude Aucouturier FN
2002 election	16 Jun 2002	–	43.47%	39.82%	60.18%	–
Sofres	17–18 May 2002	500	–	40%	60%	–
Sofres	17–18 May 2002	500	–	38%	43%	19%
Sofres	17–18 May 2002	500	–	–	81%	19%

==== Bouches-du-Rhône's 3rd ====
Polling firm	Fieldwork date	Sample size	Abs.	Gabriel Malauzat PS	Jean Roatta UMP–DL	Jackie Blanc FN
2002 election	16 Jun 2002	–	45.97%	42.83%	57.17%	–
Sofres	17–18 May 2002	500	–	42%	58%	–
Sofres	17–18 May 2002	500	–	40%	44%	16%
Sofres	17–18 May 2002	500	–	–	78%	22%

==== Bouches-du-Rhône's 4th ====
Polling firm	Fieldwork date	Sample size	Abs.	Frédéric Dutoit PCF	Patrick Mennucci PS	François Franceschi UMP–RPF	Jean-Pierre Baumann FN
2002 election	16 Jun 2002	–	49.97%	64.80%	–	–	35.20%
CSA	27–28 May 2002	500	–	61%	–	–	39%
CSA	27–28 May 2002	500	–	48%	–	24%	28%
CSA	27–28 May 2002	500	–	–	62%	–	38%
CSA	27–28 May 2002	500	–	–	50%	23%	27%

==== Bouches-du-Rhône's 5th ====
Polling firm	Fieldwork date	Sample size	Abs.	Jean-Luc Bennahmias LV–PS	Renaud Muselier UMP–RPR	Marie-Odile Rayé FN
2002 election	16 Jun 2002	–	47.90%	–	75.54%	24.46%
Sofres	17–18 May 2002	500	–	–	83%	17%
Sofres	17–18 May 2002	500	–	34%	50%	16%
Sofres	17–18 May 2002	500	–	37%	63%	–

==== Bouches-du-Rhône's 8th ====
Polling firm	Fieldwork date	Sample size	Abs.	Christophe Masse PS–PCF	Jacques Rocca Serra UDF–UMP	Stéphane Durbec FN
2002 election	16 Jun 2002	–	42.35%	44.56%	36.84%	18.60%
Sofres	17–18 May 2002	500	–	41%	38%	21%
Sofres	17–18 May 2002	500	–	50%	50%	–
Sofres	17–18 May 2002	500	–	–	73%	27%

==== Pyrénées-Atlantiques's 2nd ====
Polling firm	Fieldwork date	Sample size	Abs.	Georges Labazée PS	Jean Saint-Josse CPNT	François Bayrou UDF
2002 election	16 Jun 2002	–	31.91%	44.42%	–	55.58%
CSA	3–4 Jun 2002	502	–	45%	–	55%
CSA	3–4 Jun 2002	502	–	39%	17%	44%

==== Paris's 11th ====
Polling firm	Fieldwork date	Sample size	Abs.	Yves Cochet LV–PS	Dominique Versini UMP	Nicole Catala DVD
2002 election	16 Jun 2002	–	31.62%	51.83%	48.17%	–
CSA	31 May–1 Jun 2002	502	–	52%	48%	–
CSA	31 May–1 Jun 2002	502	–	47%	27%	26%
CSA	31 May–1 Jun 2002	502	–	51%	–	49%

==== Paris's 16th ====
Polling firm	Fieldwork date	Sample size	Abs.	Nelly Oehlhaffen PS	Françoise de Panafieu DVD	Bernard Pons UMP
2002 election	16 Jun 2002	–	54.48%	–	100.00%	–
CSA	27–29 May 2002	501	–	–	64%	36%
CSA	27–29 May 2002	501	–	19%	50%	31%

==== Tarn-et-Garonne's 1st ====
Polling firm	Fieldwork date	Sample size	Abs.	Roland Garrigues PS	Brigitte Barèges UMP	Liliane Garcia FN
2002 election	16 Jun 2002	–	29.20%	45.85%	54.15%	–
CSA	3–4 Jun 2002	500	–	47%	53%	–
CSA	3–4 Jun 2002	500	–	43%	47%	10%

==== Vaucluse's 4th ====
Polling firm	Fieldwork date	Sample size	Abs.	Jean-Pierre Lambertin PS–PCF–LV	Thierry Mariani UMP	Jacques Bompard FN
2002 election	16 Jun 2002	–	34.13%	–	57.62%	42.38%
CSA	29–30 May 2002	539	–	–	60%	40%
CSA	29–30 May 2002	539	–	30%	36%	34%

==== Essonne's 1st ====
Polling firm	Fieldwork date	Sample size	Abs.	Manuel Valls PS	Serge Dassault UMP	Gaëtan de Fresnoye FN
2002 election	16 Jun 2002	–	41.47%	52.97%	47.03%	–
CSA	30 May 2002	501	–	51%	49%	–
CSA	30 May 2002	501	–	50%	39%	11%

==== Seine-Saint-Denis's 9th ====
Polling firm	Fieldwork date	Sample size	Abs.	Élisabeth Guigou PS	Georgia Vincent UMP	Marie-Estelle Préjean FN
2002 election	16 Jun 2002	–	44.38%	56.40%	43.60%	–
CSA	3–4 Jun 2002	500	–	62%	38%	–
CSA	3–4 Jun 2002	500	–	58%	27%	15%

==== Val-d'Oise's 5th ====
Polling firm	Fieldwork date	Sample size	Abs.	Robert Hue PCF–PS–LV	Georges Mothron UMP	Micheline Bruna FN
2002 election	16 Jun 2002	–	40.88%	49.62%	50.38%	–
CSA	25–29 May 2002	501	–	50%	50%	–
CSA	25–29 May 2002	501	–	45%	42%	13%

== See also ==
- Opinion polling for the French presidential election, 2002
- Opinion polling for the French legislative election, 2007
- Opinion polling for the French legislative election, 2012
- Opinion polling for the French legislative election, 2017
