= Opinion polling for the 2002 French presidential election =

This page lists public opinion polls conducted for the 2002 French presidential election, which was held on 21 April 2002 with a run-off on 5 May 2002.

Unless otherwise noted, all polls listed below are compliant with the regulations of the national polling commission (Commission nationale des sondages) and utilize the quota method.

== First round ==
The Sofres poll conducted from 4 to 5 April 2002, marked with an asterisk (*) below, was conducted specifically for subsample data.

The publication of first-round polls was prohibited after midnight on 19 April 2002. Until the law of 19 February 2002 amended the law of 19 July 1977, the publication of voting intention polls was prohibited in the week before the election. The law of 19 February 2002 also extended the ban on the publication of polls to include surveys conducted before the electoral silence.

=== Graphical summary ===
The averages in the graphs below were constructed using polls listed below conducted by the six major French pollsters. The graphs are smoothed 14-day weighted moving averages, using only the most recent poll conducted by any given pollster within that range (each poll weighted based on recency).

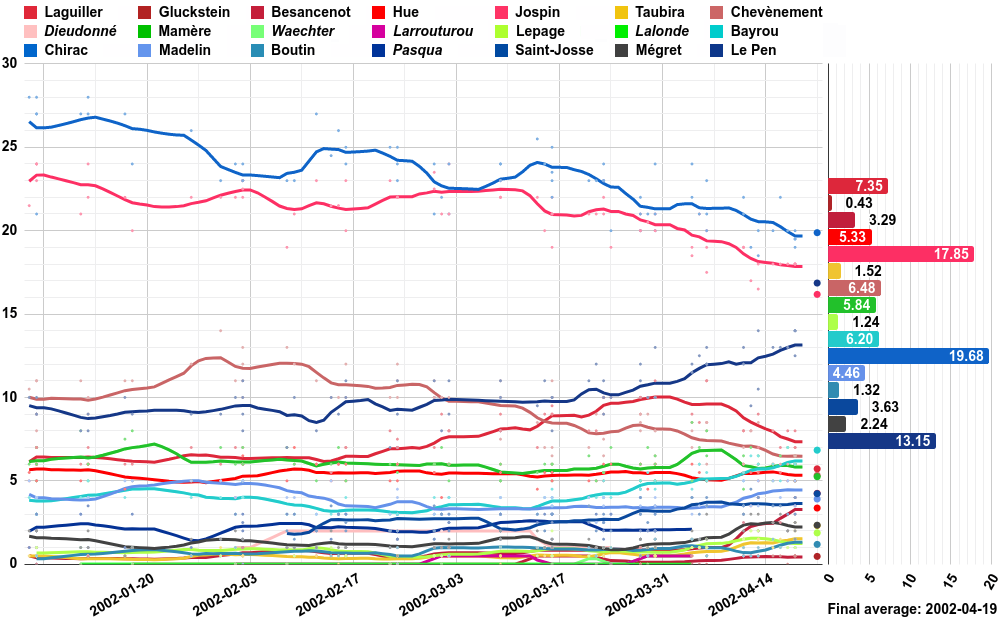

=== 28 March to 18 April 2002 ===
Polling firm	Fieldwork date	Sample size	Abs.	Laguiller LO	Gluckstein PT	Besancenot LCR	Hue PCF	Jospin PS	Taubira PRG	Chevènement MDC	Mamère LV	Lepage Cap21	Bayrou UDF	Chirac RPR	Madelin DL	Boutin FRS	Miguet RCF	Pasqua RPF	Saint- Josse CPNT	Mégret MNR	Le Pen FN
2002 election	21 Apr 2002	–	28.40%	5.72%	0.47%	4.25%	3.37%	16.18%	2.32%	5.33%	5.25%	1.88%	6.84%	19.88%	3.91%	1.19%	–	–	4.23%	2.34%	16.86%
BVA	18 Apr 2002	631	–	8%	0.5%	3.5%	5%	18%	2%	6%	5%	1%	6%	19%	5%	1%	–	–	4%	2%	14%
CSA	17–18 Apr 2002	1,000	–	7%	0.5%	3%	5%	18%	2.5%	6.5%	5%	1.5%	6%	19.5%	3.5%	1.5%	–	–	4%	2.5%	14%
Ipsos	17–18 Apr 2002	989	–	7%	0.5%	4%	5%	18%	1%	6.5%	6.5%	1%	6%	20%	4%	1%	–	–	3%	2.5%	14%
Sofres	17–18 Apr 2002	1,000	–	6.5%	0.5%	4%	6%	18%	1.5%	6.5%	6%	1%	6%	19.5%	5%	1.5%	–	–	4%	1.5%	12.5%
Louis Harris	16–17 Apr 2002	592	–	8%	0%	2%	5%	18%	1%	6%	7%	1%	7%	20%	5%	2%	–	–	3%	2%	13%
Ipsos	15–16 Apr 2002	1,005	–	7%	0.5%	2.5%	5.5%	18%	1.5%	6%	6.5%	1%	5%	22%	4%	1%	–	–	3.5%	3%	13%
Sofres	13–15 Apr 2002	1,000	–	8%	0.5%	2.5%	6%	18%	1%	6%	5%	1.5%	6%	20%	5%	1.5%	–	–	3.5%	2.5%	13%
Ifop	12–13 Apr 2002	1,006	–	7%	0.5%	4%	5.5%	16.5%	1.5%	8.5%	6.5%	2%	6.5%	20%	3.5%	0.5%	–	–	4%	3%	10.5%
BVA	10–13 Apr 2002	749	–	9%	0.5%	2%	5%	18%	1.5%	6%	6%	1.5%	6%	18.5%	5%	1%	–	–	4%	2%	14%
Ifop	11–12 Apr 2002	951	–	8%	0.5%	3.5%	5.5%	17%	2%	8%	7%	2%	6.5%	19%	3.5%	0.5%	–	–	4.5%	3%	9.5%
CSA	10–11 Apr 2002	1,000	–	8%	0.5%	1.5%	5.5%	19%	1%	7%	6.5%	1.5%	5.5%	21%	3.5%	1%	–	–	3.5%	3%	12%
Sofres	10–11 Apr 2002	1,000	–	8%	0.5%	2.5%	6%	19%	1.5%	6%	4.5%	1.5%	5%	22%	5%	0.5%	–	–	3%	2%	13%
Ifop	5–6 Apr 2002	1,004	–	8.5%	0.5%	1%	5%	17.5%	1%	8%	8%	1.5%	5.5%	21%	3.5%	1%	–	–	4%	1%	13%
Ipsos	5–6 Apr 2002	952	–	11%	0%	1%	5%	19%	0.5%	8.5%	5%	1%	5%	23%	3.5%	0.5%	–	–	3.5%	1.5%	12%
BVA	4–6 Apr 2002	657	–	11%	–	1%	5%	20%	1%	6%	6.5%	1.5%	5%	20%	3.5%	0.5%	–	0.5%	3.5%	3%	12%
Sofres*	4–5 Apr 2002	1,000	–	8.5%	0%	1%	5.5%	21%	1%	6%	7%	1%	6%	21%	3.5%	1.5%	–	–	3%	1.5%	12.5%
CSA	3–4 Apr 2002	1,000	–	8.5%	0.5%	1%	4%	18.5%	0.5%	8%	8.5%	1.5%	4.5%	22%	3%	1.5%	–	–	5%	1.5%	11.5%
Sofres	3–4 Apr 2002	1,000	–	9%	0%	0.5%	6%	19%	1%	7%	5%	1%	4%	24%	4%	1.5%	0%	–	4%	2%	12%
Ipsos	29–30 Mar 2002	938	–	10%	–	1%	5%	20%	0.5%	8%	5%	0.5%	5%	24%	3%	1%	–	2%	3.5%	1.5%	10%
Ipsos	29–30 Mar 2002	938	–	11%	–	1%	5%	21%	0.5%	10.5%	5%	0.5%	5.5%	27%	3.5%	1%	–	4%	4.5%	–	–
Louis Harris	29–30 Mar 2002	1,001	–	10%	–	1%	6%	21%	0.5%	8%	6%	1%	4.5%	21%	3.5%	1.5%	–	2%	3%	1%	10%
BVA	28–30 Mar 2002	661	–	11%	–	0.5%	6%	20%	0.5%	6.5%	6.5%	0.5%	5%	20%	4%	1%	–	2%	2%	1.5%	13%

=== 17 October 2001 to 27 March 2002 ===
Polling firm	Fieldwork date	Sample size	Laguiller LO	Gluckstein PT	Besancenot LCR	Hue PCF	Jospin PS	Taubira PRG	Chevènement MDC	Dieudonné LU	Mamère LV	Waechter MEI	Larrouturou ND	Lepage Cap21	Lalonde GE	Bayrou UDF	Chirac RPR	Madelin DL	Boutin FRS	Pasqua RPF	Saint- Josse CPNT	Mégret MNR	Le Pen FN
Ifop	28–29 Mar 2002	936	10%	<0.5%	1%	4.5%	20.5%	1%	9%	–	7%	0.5%	0.5%	1%	<0.5%	5.5%	21%	2%	0.5%	2%	2.5%	1%	10%
CSA	27–28 Mar 2002	1,003	9%	0.5%	1%	5%	20%	0.5%	9%	–	5%	–	–	1%	–	4.5%	20%	3.5%	1.5%	1.5%	4.5%	1.5%	12%
Sofres	27–28 Mar 2002	1,000	10%	0%	1%	6%	20%	0.5%	8.5%	–	6%	–	–	0.5%	–	4.5%	21%	4%	0.5%	2%	4%	0.5%	11%
Sofres	27–28 Mar 2002	1,000	10%	0%	0.5%	6%	21%	0%	8%	–	5%	–	–	0.5%	–	5%	22%	4%	0.5%	3%	3%	1.5%	10%
Ifop	23–24 Mar 2002	1,005	10%	<0.5%	1%	6%	19%	1%	10%	1%	7%	<0.5%	<0.5%	1%	<0.5%	4%	20%	3%	1%	3%	2%	<0.5%	10%
Ipsos	22–23 Mar 2002	938	10%	–	0.5%	5%	22%	0.5%	9%	–	5.5%	–	–	0.5%	–	5%	24%	2.5%	1%	2%	2.5%	1%	9%
Sofres	22–23 Mar 2002	1,000	10%	–	1%	6%	21%	0.5%	7.5%	–	5.5%	–	–	1%	–	4%	23%	4%	1%	1.5%	3%	1%	10%
BVA	21–23 Mar 2002	647	10%	–	1%	5.5%	23%	1%	6.5%	–	5.5%	–	–	1%	–	4%	23%	3.5%	0.5%	1%	2.5%	1%	11%
Ifop	21–22 Mar 2002	947	8%	0.5%	0.5%	5%	21%	<0.5%	9%	1%	5%	0.5%	<0.5%	0.5%	<0.5%	4%	23%	2.5%	0.5%	3%	2%	1%	12%
CSA	20–21 Mar 2002	1,000	8%	1%		5%	21%	0.5%	7%	–	6.5%	–	–	0.5%	–	4%	23%	4%	1%	2.5%	3.5%	1.5%	11%
Ifop	15–16 Mar 2002	933	10%	0.5%	0.5%	5%	19%	0.5%	11%	1%	6%	<0.5%	<0.5%	0.5%	<0.5%	4%	22%	3%	1%	3%	3%	1%	8%
Ipsos	15–16 Mar 2002	919	9%	–	0.5%	5.5%	21%	0.5%	10%	–	5.5%	–	–	1%	–	4%	23%	3%	1%	3%	1.5%	1.5%	10%
Ipsos	15–16 Mar 2002	919	9.5%	–	0.5%	5.5%	22%	0.5%	11%	–	5.5%	–	–	1%	–	4.5%	27.5%	3%	1%	6.5%	2%	–	–
BVA	14–16 Mar 2002	739	9%	–	1%	6%	22%	0.5%	7%	–	5%	–	–	2%	–	3.5%	25%	3.5%	0.5%	1.5%	3%	0.5%	10%
Sofres	13–16 Mar 2002	1,000	9.5%	–	1%	5.5%	21%	0.5%	6.5%	–	6%	–	–	0.5%	–	4.5%	23.5%	4%	1%	2.5%	3%	1%	10%
Sofres	14–15 Mar 2002	1,000	9%	–	1%	5.5%	20%	0.5%	7%	–	6%	–	–	1%	–	4%	24%	4%	1%	3%	2%	1%	11%
CSA	13–14 Mar 2002	1,001	7%	0.5%	1%	4.5%	22%	1%	8.5%	–	5.5%	–	–	0.5%	–	3%	25.5%	3%	1%	2.5%	3%	2%	9.5%
Ipsos	8–9 Mar 2002	933	8%	–	0.5%	6%	22%	0.5%	11%	–	6%	–	–	0.5%	–	3%	24%	3%	1%	3%	2%	1.5%	8%
Ipsos	8–9 Mar 2002	933	8.5%	–	0.5%	6.5%	23%	0.5%	12.5%	–	6%	–	–	0.5%	–	3.5%	27%	3%	1%	4.5%	3%	–	–
Louis Harris	8–9 Mar 2002	626	8%	–	1%	5%	23%	<0.5%	10%	–	5%	–	–	1%	–	3%	24%	3%	1%	2%	2%	2%	10%
Sofres	8–9 Mar 2002	1,000	9%	–	0.5%	5.5%	22%	0.5%	7.5%	–	5%	–	–	1%	–	4%	23%	4%	1%	3%	1.5%	1.5%	11%
Ipsos	1–2 Mar 2002	925	8%	–	1%	6%	21%	0.5%	10%	–	6%	–	–	0.5%	–	4%	24%	3%	0.5%	2.5%	3%	1%	9%
BVA	28 Feb–2 Mar 2002	693	8%	–	0.5%	6%	24%	0.5%	8%	–	5%	–	–	1%	–	4%	21%	4%	1%	2%	2.5%	1.5%	11%
Ifop	28 Feb–1 Mar 2002	941	9%	<0.5%	0.5%	4%	21%	0.5%	10%	2%	7%	<0.5%	0.5%	0.5%	<0.5%	3%	22%	3%	1%	3%	3%	1%	8%
CSA	27–28 Feb 2002	1,007	6%	0.5%		5.5%	23.5%	0.5%	11%	–	6%	–	–	0.5%	–	4%	21%	3%	1.5%	1.5%	3.5%	2%	10%
Sofres	27–28 Feb 2002	1,000	7%	–	1%	5.5%	22.5%	0.5%	10%	–	6%	–	–	0.5%	–	3%	24%	3%	1%	2%	2%	1%	11%
Ifop	22–23 Feb 2002	937	7%	<1%	<1%	5%	22%	<1%	12%	2%	6%	<1%	<1%	<1%	<1%	3%	23%	4%	<1%	3%	3%	1%	7%
Ipsos	22–23 Feb 2002	938	7%	–	0.5%	6%	22%	0.5%	11%	–	6%	–	–	0.5%	–	3%	25%	3%	0.5%	1.5%	3%	1.5%	9%
Sofres	22–23 Feb 2002	1,000	7.5%	–	0.5%	6%	22%	0.5%	10%	–	5.5%	–	–	0.5%	–	3%	24%	4.5%	1%	1.5%	2%	0.5%	11%
Ifop	21–22 Feb 2002	939	8%	<1%	<1%	5%	23%	<1%	10%	2%	6%	<1%	<1%	<1%	<1%	3%	25%	3%	1%	2%	2%	1%	7%
Ipsos	15–16 Feb 2002	916	7%	–	1%	6%	20%	0.5%	12%	–	5%	–	–	0.5%	–	3%	25%	3%	1%	3%	2%	1%	10%
BVA	14–16 Feb 2002	743	7%	–	0.5%	5%	23%	0.5%	10%	–	6%	–	–	1%	–	4%	24%	3%	0.5%	1%	2.5%	1%	11%
Sofres	13–15 Feb 2002	1,000	6%	–	0.5%	6%	21.5%	0%	10%	–	7%	–	–	0.5%	–	3%	26%	3%	0.5%	3%	3%	1%	9%
CSA	13–14 Feb 2002	1,000	5.5%	–	0.5%	5%	21.5%	0.5%	10%	–	6%	–	–	1%	–	3%	24.5%	5%	0.5%	1.5%	3.5%	2%	10%
Ipsos	12 Feb 2002	1,018	6%	–	0.5%	6%	23%	0.5%	11%	–	5%	–	–	1%	–	3%	27%	3%	1%	2%	2%	1%	8%
Ipsos	8–9 Feb 2002	908	6%	–	0.5%	7%	21%	0.5%	12%	–	6%	–	–	0.5%	–	3%	23%	4%	1%	3%	1.5%	1%	10%
Ifop	7–8 Feb 2002	961	7%	<1%	1%	5%	19%	<1%	13%	2%	7%	<1%	<1%	1%	<1%	3%	23%	4%	1%	3%	2%	1%	7%
Ipsos	1–2 Feb 2002	925	6%	–	0.5%	6%	23%	0.5%	12%	–	6%	–	–	1%	–	4%	23%	5%	1%	3%	–	1%	8%
Louis Harris	1–2 Feb 2002	844	6%	–	1%	5%	23%	0.5%	13%	–	5%	–	–	1%	–	5%	23%	5%	<0.5%	2.5%	–	1%	9%
Sofres	1–2 Feb 2002	1,000	6%	–	1%	6.5%	22.5%	–	11%	–	6%	–	–	–	–	4%	24%	5%	–	1.5%	–	1.5%	11%
BVA	31 Jan–2 Feb 2002	788	7%	–	1%	5%	22%	1%	10%	–	7%	–	–	1%	–	4%	23%	5%	0.5%	2%	–	1.5%	10%
Ifop	31 Jan–1 Feb 2002	963	7%	<1%	<1%	4%	22%	<1%	11%	1%	6%	<1%	<1%	1%	<1%	3%	24%	4%	1%	3%	–	2%	10%
CSA	29–30 Jan 2002	1,001	6%	–	0.5%	5%	22%	1%	14%	–	7%	–	–	0.5%	–	4%	23%	5%	–	1.5%	–	1.5%	9%
Ipsos	25–26 Jan 2002	962	7%	–	0.5%	5%	22%	0.5%	12%	–	5%	–	–	1%	–	4%	26%	5%	0.5%	1%	–	1.5%	9%
Ifop	17–18 Jan 2002	943	6%	<1%	<1%	5%	20%	<1%	11%	–	8%	<1%	–	1%	<1%	5%	24%	5%	1%	3%	–	1%	9%
CSA	17 Jan 2002	1,006	6%	–	0.5%	4.5%	22%	0.5%	11%	–	7.5%	–	–	0.5%	–	4%	27%	5%	–	1%	–	0.5%	10%
Ipsos	11–12 Jan 2002	947	6%	–	0.5%	6%	24%	0.5%	10%	–	5%	–	–	0.5%	–	5%	28%	4%	0.5%	1%	–	1%	8%
Sofres	11–12 Jan 2002	1,000	7%	–	0.5%	6%	22%	–	9%	–	6%	–	–	–	–	4%	27%	4%	–	3.5%	–	2%	9%
Ifop	10–11 Jan 2002	963	6%	–	<1%	5%	21%	<1%	11%	–	8%	<1%	–	1%	<1%	4%	27%	3%	1%	3%	–	1%	8%
Sofres	5 Jan 2002	800	7%	–	0%	6%	24%	–	9%	–	6%	–	–	–	–	3%	27%	4%	–	3%	–	2%	9%
Ipsos	4–5 Jan 2002	955	6%	–	0.5%	6%	23%	0.5%	11%	–	5%	–	–	0.5%	–	4%	28%	3%	0.5%	2%	–	1%	9%
Louis Harris	4–5 Jan 2002	1,003	7%	–	<0.5%	5%	24%	–	8%	–	7%	–	–	1%	–	3%	27%	4%	<0.5%	3%	–	2%	9%
BVA	2–5 Jan 2002	735	7%	–	0.5%	6%	24%	0.5%	11%	–	7%	–	–	0.5%	–	5%	21%	4%	0.5%	2%	–	1%	10%
CSA	3–4 Jan 2002	1,005	5%	–	1%	5.5%	21.5%	0.5%	10.5%	–	6%	–	–	–	–	4%	28%	5%	–	1%	–	2%	10%
Sofres	14–15 Dec 2001	1,000	7%	–	0.5%	6.5%	22%	–	9%	–	7%	–	–	–	–	3%	27%	5%	–	3%	–	1.5%	8.5%
CSA	11–12 Dec 2001	1,000	7%	–	0.5%	5.5%	22%	–	10%	–	8%	–	–	–	–	5%	25%	5%	–	2%	–	1%	9%
Ipsos	7–8 Dec 2001	840	6%	–	0.5%	6%	22%	0.5%	12%	–	6%	–	–	1%	–	4%	27%	3%	0.5%	2%	–	1.5%	8%
BVA	29 Nov–1 Dec 2001	680	5%	–	0.5%	5%	24%	–	8%	–	9%	–	–	1%	–	4%	23%	4%	0.5%	4%	–	1%	11%
Ifop	29–30 Nov 2001	943	7%	–	<1%	4%	22%	–	10%	–	8%	<1%	–	1%	–	5%	26%	5%	<1%	4%	–	1%	6%
Sofres	22–23 Nov 2001	1,000	7%	–	–	6.5%	22%	–	8%	–	6%	–	–	–	–	4.5%	27%	5%	–	4%	–	1%	9%
CSA	14–15 Nov 2001	1,006	6%	–	1%	5%	23%	–	10%	–	8%	–	–	–	–	4.5%	25%	4.5%	–	3%	–	1%	9%
Ipsos	9–10 Nov 2001	927	5%	–	0.5%	6%	22%	–	11%	–	7%	–	–	0.5%	–	4%	27%	4%	0.5%	3%	–	1.5%	8%
BVA	25–27 Oct 2001	685	7%	–	0.5%	5%	22%	–	12%	–	6%	–	–	1%	–	4%	24%	5%	1%	3%	–	0.5%	9%
Ipsos	19–20 Oct 2001	829	5%	–	0.5%	5%	23%	–	12%	–	6%	–	–	0.5%	–	5%	26%	5%	0.5%	4%	–	1.5%	6%
Sofres	19–20 Oct 2001	1,000	6%	–	–	6%	23%	–	8.5%	–	5.5%	–	–	–	–	5%	27%	5%	–	3%	–	–	11%
CSA	17–18 Oct 2001	1,005	7%	–	0.5%	5.5%	23%	–	9%	–	7%	–	–	–	–	5%	26%	5%	–	3%	–	0.5%	8.5%

=== 15 February to 16 October 2001 ===
Polling firm	Fieldwork date	Sample size	Laguiller LO	Besancenot LCR	Hue PCF	Jospin PS	Chevènement MDC	Dieudonné LU	Mamère LV	Lipietz LV	Voynet LV	Waechter MEI	Lepage Cap21	Lalonde GE	Bayrou UDF	Chirac RPR	Madelin DL	Boutin FRS	Pasqua RPF	Villiers MPF	Mégret MNR	Le Pen FN
Ifop	11–12 Oct 2001	761	6%	<1%	5%	23%	10%	–	8%	–	–	<1%	1%	–	6%	24%	4%	<1%	5%	–	–	7%
Ifop	11–12 Oct 2001	761	7%	<1%	5%	26%	11%	–	–	2%	–	<1%	1%	–	5%	26%	4%	<1%	5%	–	–	7%
BVA	27–29 Sep 2001	773	6%	1%	6%	26%	8%	–	–	3%	–	–	0.5%	–	5%	25%	7%	0.5%	3%	–	1%	8%
CSA	11–12 Sep 2001	1,000	7%	1%	6%	24%	9%	–	–	4%	–	–	–	–	6%	26%	6%	–	2%	–	1%	8%
Sofres	7–8 Sep 2001	1,000	7%	–	6%	27%	9%	–	–	2%	–	–	–	–	5%	26%	5%	0.5%	4%	–	1.5%	7%
BVA	30 Aug–1 Sep 2001	682	6%	1%	4%	25%	6%	–	–	4%	–	–	–	1%	6%	26%	5%	1%	6%	–	2%	7%
CSA	16–17 Jul 2001	1,005	7%	–	7%	26%	6%	–	–	3%	–	–	–	–	5%	30%	5%	–	3%	–	1%	7%
BVA	5–7 Jul 2001	605	7%	1%	6%	26%	5%	–	–	5%	–	–	2%	–	5%	25%	5%	2%	2%	–	2%	7%
Sofres	22–23 Jun 2001	1,000	7%	–	6%	27%	6%	–	–	3%	–	–	–	–	5%	26%	5%	1%	4%	–	–	10%
Sofres	22–23 Jun 2001	1,000	9%	–	7%	27.5%	7%	–	–	3%	–	–	–	–	6.5%	31%	9%	–	–	–	–	–
CSA	20–21 Jun 2001	1,000	6.5%	–	6.5%	27%	5%	–	–	4%	–	–	–	–	6%	28%	6%	–	2%	–	2%	7%
BVA	14–16 Jun 2001	658	8%	–	7%	24%	6%	–	7%	–	–	–	–	–	6%	23%	5%	–	5%	–	1%	8%
Ipsos	8–9 Jun 2001	839	6%	–	6%	27%	4%	–	5%	–	–	–	–	–	5%	30%	3%	3%	3%	–	2%	6%
Ipsos	8–9 Jun 2001	839	6%	–	6%	27%	4%	–	5%	–	–	–	–	–	5%	32%	3%	3%	–	–	2%	7%
Ipsos	8–9 Jun 2001	839	6%	–	6%	28%	4%	–	5%	–	–	–	–	–	5%	33%	4%	4%	5%	–	–	–
Ipsos	8–9 Jun 2001	839	6%	–	6%	28%	5%	–	6%	–	–	–	–	–	6%	38%	5%	–	–	–	–	–
CSA	29–30 May 2001	900	6%	–	8%	28%	4%	–	5%	–	–	–	–	–	5%	27%	5%	–	2%	–	2%	8%
Sofres	15–16 May 2001	840	6%	–	5.5%	27%	5%	–	7%	–	–	–	–	–	6%	26%	5%	–	3%	–	1.5%	8%
BVA	10–12 May 2001	640	7%	–	6%	27%	3%	–	7%	–	–	–	–	–	6%	25%	5%	–	6%	–	–	8%
CSA	26–27 Apr 2001	922	6%	–	6%	25%	5%	–	5%	–	–	–	–	–	7%	30%	3%	–	3%	–	2%	8%
BVA	20–21 Apr 2001	733	8%	–	5%	26%	4%	–	–	–	7%	–	–	–	6%	24%	7%	–	6%	–	–	7%
Sofres	28–29 Mar 2001	1,000	6.5%	–	5%	28%	3%	–	5.5%	–	–	–	–	–	5%	27%	5%	–	3.5%	–	3%	8.5%
CSA	26 Mar 2001	1,000	5%	–	5%	28%	3%	–	7%	–	–	–	–	–	7%	28%	4%	–	4%	–	2%	7%
BVA	22–24 Mar 2001	678	6%	–	6%	26%	5%	–	8%	–	–	–	–	–	6%	25%	5%	–	6%	–	–	7%
BVA	22–24 Feb 2001	657	7.5%	–	6%	28%	4%	–	5%	–	–	–	–	–	5%	26%	6%	–	4.5%	–	–	8%
Ifop	15–16 Feb 2001	805	6%	–	5%	27%	5%	4%	7%	–	–	–	–	–	4%	24%	3%	–	5%	2%	–	8%

=== 21 August 1998 to 14 February 2001 ===
Polling firm	Fieldwork date	Sample size	Laguiller LO	Hue PCF	Jospin PS	Chevènement MDC	Voynet LV	Bové SE	Bayrou UDF	Chirac RPR	Séguin RPR	Madelin DL	Boutin FRS	Pasqua RPF	Villiers MPF	Saint-Josse CPNT	Mégret MNR	Le Pen FN
Ipsos	9–10 Feb 2001	955	6%	5%	30%	4%	3%	–	5%	29%	–	5%	–	4%	–	–	–	9%
Sofres	2–3 Feb 2001	1,000	6%	7%	30%	3.5%	5%	–	5%	24%	–	6%	–	3.5%	–	–	2%	8%
BVA	1–3 Feb 2001	667	7%	6%	29%	4%	4%	–	7%	26%	–	5%	–	5%	–	–	–	7%
BVA	11–13 Jan 2001	634	7%	6%	27%	3%	4%	–	7%	28%	–	5%	–	5%	–	–	–	8%
CSA	5–6 Jan 2001	1,000	6%	7%	29%	3%	5%	–	7%	23%	–	5%	–	5%	–	–	1%	9%
Ipsos	5 Dec 2000	818	4%	5%	29%	5%	4%	–	8%	25%	–	5%	–	7%	2%	–	1%	5%
Sofres	1–2 Dec 2000	1,000	6%	6%	30%	6%	5%	–	6%	22%	–	6.5%	–	6%	–	–	1%	5.5%
BVA	30 Nov–2 Dec 2000	945	8%	6%	28%	2%	4%	–	7%	26%	–	4%	–	6%	–	–	–	9%
Ifop	27 Nov 2000	803	6%	6%	27%	4%	5%	–	5%	24%	–	5%	<1%	6%	4%	–	–	8%
CSA	14–15 Nov 2000	1,000	6%	5.5%	28%	5%	4%	–	6%	27%	–	–	–	7.5%	–	–	1%	10%
BVA	8–10 Nov 2000	636	8%	7%	30%	–	4%	–	6%	27%	–	3%	–	5%	–	–	–	10%
BVA	6–8 Oct 2000	627	7%	8%	29%	–	3%	–	4%	30%	–	4%	–	7%	–	–	–	8%
Ipsos	29–30 Sep 2000	939	5%	7%	28%	6%	3%	–	6%	27%	–	–	–	10%	–	–	2%	6%
BVA	7–9 Sep 2000	581	7%	7%	27%	–	4%	–	6%	32%	–	3%	–	10%	–	–	–	4%
CSA	6–7 Sep 2000	1,000	6%	5.5%	25%	7%	5.5%	–	4%	30%	–	–	–	7.5%	–	–	1%	8.5%
BVA	20–22 Jul 2000	680	6%	6%	32%	–	4%	–	4%	31%	–	3%	–	8%	–	–	–	6%
Ipsos	15 Jul 2000	874	5%	6%	29%	–	4%	6%	4%	32%	–	–	–	6%	–	–	2%	6%
CSA	28–29 Jun 2000	1,000	7%	7%	28%	–	5%	–	4%	33%	–	–	–	7%	–	–	2%	7%
BVA	15–17 Jun 2000	638	6.5%	6%	33%	–	3%	–	4%	29%	–	2.5%	–	8%	–	–	–	8%
BVA	11–13 May 2000	691	5.5%	7%	31%	–	4%	–	4%	30%	–	3%	–	8.5%	–	–	–	7%
CSA	10–13 May 2000	1,000	6%	6%	27%	–	5%	–	5%	34%	–	–	–	6%	–	–	3%	8%
Ipsos	28–29 Apr 2000	825	3%	7%	32%	–	3%	–	3%	33%	–	–	–	9%	–	3%	1%	6%
BVA	13–15 Apr 2000	535	6%	7%	31%	–	3.5%	–	4%	29%	–	3%	–	9%	–	–	–	7.5%
BVA	16–18 Mar 2000	984	7%	6.5%	31%	–	4%	–	4%	26.5%	–	3%	–	11%	–	–	–	7%
Ipsos	10–11 Mar 2000	920	5%	6%	30%	–	4%	–	3%	30%	–	–	–	10%	–	4%	2%	6%
Ifop	2–3 Mar 2000	941	7%	6%	27%	–	6%	–	6%	26%	–	–	–	13%	–	–	–	9%
Ifop	2–3 Mar 2000	941	8%	6%	30%	–	6%	–	8%	–	17%	–	–	16%	–	–	–	9%
CSA	28–29 Feb 2000	1,000	7%	6%	29%	–	4%	–	5%	29%	–	–	–	9%	–	–	3%	8%
BVA	17–19 Feb 2000	615	6%	6.5%	31.5%	–	4%	–	5%	24%	–	4%	–	10%	–	–	–	9%
BVA	13–15 Jan 2000	567	5%	6.5%	31.5%	–	3%	–	4%	24%	–	3%	–	11%	–	–	–	12%
CSA	4–5 Jan 2000	1,000	5.5%	7.5%	31%	–	5%	–	5.5%	28%	–	–	–	8.5%	–	–	1%	8%
Sofres	27–29 Dec 1999	995	7%	7%	29%	–	6%	–	6%	26%	–	–	–	10%	–	–	2%	7%
CSA	3–4 Nov 1999	1,000	5%	8%	32%	–	5%	–	5%	30%	–	–	–	–	6%	–	1%	8%
CSA	1–2 Sep 1999	1,000	5%	6%	30%	–	5%	–	6%	31%	–	–	–	–	8%	–	1%	8%
CSA	1–2 Jul 1999	1,004	5%	7%	31%	–	5%	–	6%	31%	–	–	–	–	8%	–	2%	5%
CSA	6–7 May 1999	1,002	4.5%	7%	29%	–	4.5%	–	5%	34%	–	–	–	–	5%	–	3%	8%
CSA	5–6 Mar 1999	1,003	4.5%	9%	30%	–	3.5%	–	5%	35%	–	–	–	–	3%	–	3%	7%
CSA	18–19 Dec 1998	1,006	5%	8%	28%	–	5%	–	5%	31%	–	–	–	–	4%	–	5%	9%
BVA	10–13 Dec 1998	612	5%	7%	29%	–	5%	–	4%	32%	–	8%	–	–	–	–	–	10%
CSA	21–22 Aug 1998	1,003	5%	10%	31%	–	5%	–	5%	30%	–	–	–	–	3%	–	–	11%

=== 17 April 1996 to 20 August 1998 ===
Polling firm	Fieldwork date	Sample size	Abs.	Laguiller LO	Hue PCF	Jospin PS	Voynet LV	Léotard UDF	Balladur UDF	Chirac RPR	Séguin RPR	Villiers MPF	Le Pen FN	Cheminade S&P
CSA	18 Aug 1997	1,000	–	5%	9%	29.5%	4%	3%	–	36.5%	–	–	13%	–
CSA	18 Aug 1997	1,000	–	5%	8.5%	31.5%	5%	7%	–	–	29%	–	14%	–
CSA	17–19 Apr 1996	1,000	–	4%	8%	26%	2%	–	16%	25%	–	5%	14%	0%
1995 election	23 Apr 1995	–	21.62%	5.30%	8.64%	23.30%	3.32%	–	18.58%	20.84%	–	4.74%	15.00%	0.28%

=== By department ===
Paris

Polling firm	Fieldwork date	Sample size	Abs.	Laguiller LO	Gluckstein PT	Besancenot LCR	Hue PCF	Jospin PS	Taubira PRG	Chevènement MDC	Mamère LV	Lepage Cap21	Bayrou UDF	Chirac RPR	Madelin DL	Boutin FRS	Saint- Josse CPNT	Mégret MNR	Le Pen FN
2002 election	21 Apr 2002	–	29.81%	3.05%	0.34%	3.42%	2.19%	19.94%	3.78%	6.62%	7.39%	2.46%	7.91%	24.01%	6.50%	1.49%	0.52%	1.02%	9.35%
Ipsos	20–21 Mar 2002	804	–	10%	–	1%	3%	23%	0.5%	10%	6%	1%	4%	27%	4%	1%	0.5%	1%	6%

Réunion

Polling firm	Fieldwork date	Sample size	Abs.	Laguiller LO	Gluckstein PT	Besancenot LCR	Hue PCF	Jospin PS	Taubira PRG	Chevènement MDC	Mamère LV	Lepage Cap21	Bayrou UDF	Chirac RPR	Madelin DL	Boutin FRS	Pasqua RPF	Saint- Josse CPNT	Mégret MNR	Le Pen FN
2002 election	21 Apr 2002	–	43.68%	2.55%	0.22%	1.93%	1.18%	39.01%	2.10%	3.13%	2.14%	0.95%	2.50%	37.15%	1.05%	0.91%	–	0.49%	0.87%	3.81%
Ipsos	25–26 Feb 2002	838	–	5%	–	<0.5%	4%	38%	2%	6%	3%	<0.5%	1%	37%	1%	<0.5%	<0.5%	<0.5%	<0.5%	1%

== Second round ==
The Sofres poll conducted from 4 to 5 April 2002, marked with an asterisk (*) below, was conducted specifically for subsample data.

The publication of second-round polls was prohibited after midnight on 3 May 2002.

=== Chirac–Le Pen ===
Polling firm	Fieldwork date	Sample size	Abs.	Chirac RPR	Le Pen FN
2002 election	5 May 2002	–	20.29%	82.21%	17.79%
CSA	3 May 2002	1,000	–	80%	20%
Ipsos	30 Apr–2 May 2002	1,012	–	79%	21%
Ipsos	26–27 Apr 2002	922	–	78%	22%
CSA	23–24 Apr 2002	1,000	–	81%	19%
CSA	21 Apr 2002	1,000	–	77%	23%
Ipsos	21 Apr 2002	1,043	–	80%	20%
Sofres	21 Apr 2002	1,000	–	78%	22%

=== Jospin–Chirac ===
Graphical summary

The averages in the graphs below were constructed using polls listed below conducted by the six major French pollsters. The graphs are 14-day weighted moving averages, using only the most recent poll conducted by any given pollster within that range (each poll weighted based on recency).

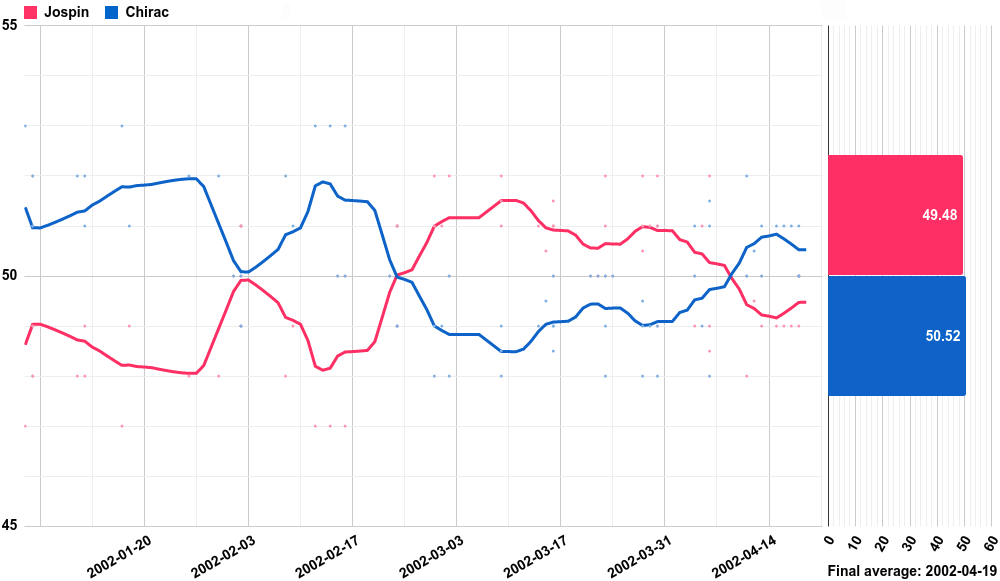

Polling firm	Fieldwork date	Sample size	Abs.	Jospin PS	Chirac RPR
BVA	18 Apr 2002	579	–	50%	50%
CSA	17–18 Apr 2002	1,000	–	50%	50%
Ipsos	17–18 Apr 2002	989	–	49%	51%
Sofres	17–18 Apr 2002	1,000	–	50%	50%
Louis Harris	16–17 Apr 2002	577	–	49%	51%
Ipsos	15–16 Apr 2002	1,005	–	49%	51%
Sofres	13–15 Apr 2002	1,000	–	49%	51%
Ifop	12–13 Apr 2002	1,006	–	49%	51%
BVA	10–13 Apr 2002	641	–	50%	50%
Ifop	11–12 Apr 2002	951	–	49.5%	50.5%
CSA	10–11 Apr 2002	1,000	–	48%	52%
Sofres	10–11 Apr 2002	1,000	–	50%	50%
Ifop	5–6 Apr 2002	1,004	–	48.5%	51.5%
Ipsos	5–6 Apr 2002	952	–	49%	51%
BVA	4–6 Apr 2002	595	–	52%	48%
Sofres*	4–5 Apr 2002	1,000	–	51%	49%
CSA	3–4 Apr 2002	1,000	–	50%	50%
Sofres	3–4 Apr 2002	1,000	–	49%	51%
Ipsos	29–30 Mar 2002	938	–	49%	51%
Louis Harris	29–30 Mar 2002	1,001	–	51%	49%
BVA	28–30 Mar 2002	594	–	52%	48%
Ifop	28–29 Mar 2002	936	–	51%	49%
CSA	27–28 Mar 2002	1,003	–	50.5%	49.5%
Sofres	27–28 Mar 2002	1,000	–	52%	48%
Sofres	27–28 Mar 2002	1,000	–	51%	49%
Ifop	23–24 Mar 2002	1,005	–	50%	50%
Ipsos	22–23 Mar 2002	938	–	50%	50%
Sofres	22–23 Mar 2002	1,000	–	51%	49%
BVA	21–23 Mar 2002	588	–	52%	48%
Ifop	21–22 Mar 2002	947	–	50%	50%
CSA	20–21 Mar 2002	1,000	–	50%	50%
Ifop	15–16 Mar 2002	933	–	51.5%	48.5%
Ipsos	15–16 Mar 2002	919	–	50%	50%
BVA	14–16 Mar 2002	641	–	51%	49%
Sofres	13–16 Mar 2002	1,000	–	51%	49%
Sofres	14–15 Mar 2002	1,000	–	50.5%	49.5%
CSA	13–14 Mar 2002	1,001	–	51%	49%
Ipsos	8–9 Mar 2002	933	–	51%	49%
Louis Harris	8–9 Mar 2002	603	–	52%	48%
Sofres	8–9 Mar 2002	1,000	–	51.5%	48.5%
Ipsos	1–2 Mar 2002	925	–	50%	50%
BVA	28 Feb–2 Mar 2002	630	–	52%	48%
Ifop	28 Feb–1 Mar 2002	941	–	51%	49%
CSA	27–28 Feb 2002	1,007	–	52%	48%
Sofres	27–28 Feb 2002	1,000	–	51%	49%
Ifop	22–23 Feb 2002	937	–	51%	49%
Ipsos	22–23 Feb 2002	938	–	49%	51%
Sofres	22–23 Feb 2002	1,000	–	51%	49%
Ifop	21–22 Feb 2002	939	–	50%	50%
Ipsos	15–16 Feb 2002	916	–	47%	53%
BVA	14–16 Feb 2002	713	–	50%	50%
Sofres	13–15 Feb 2002	1,000	–	50%	50%
CSA	13–14 Feb 2002	1,000	–	47%	53%
Ipsos	12 Feb 2002	1,018	–	47%	53%
Ipsos	8–9 Feb 2002	908	–	49%	51%
Ifop	7–8 Feb 2002	961	–	48%	52%
Ipsos	1–2 Feb 2002	925	–	49%	51%
Louis Harris	1–2 Feb 2002	839	–	51%	49%
Sofres	1–2 Feb 2002	1,000	–	50%	50%
BVA	31 Jan–2 Feb 2002	697	–	51%	49%
Ifop	31 Jan–1 Feb 2002	963	–	50%	50%
CSA	29–30 Jan 2002	1,001	–	48%	52%
Ipsos	25–26 Jan 2002	962	–	48%	52%
Ifop	17–18 Jan 2002	943	–	49%	51%
CSA	17 Jan 2002	1,006	–	47%	53%
Ipsos	11–12 Jan 2002	947	–	48%	52%
Sofres	11–12 Jan 2002	1,000	–	49%	51%
Ifop	10–11 Jan 2002	963	–	48%	52%
Sofres	5 Jan 2002	800	–	49%	51%
Ipsos	4–5 Jan 2002	955	–	48%	52%
Louis Harris	4–5 Jan 2002	1,003	–	49%	51%
BVA	2–5 Jan 2002	735	–	52%	48%
CSA	3–4 Jan 2002	1,005	–	47%	53%
Sofres	14–15 Dec 2001	1,000	–	49%	51%
CSA	11–12 Dec 2001	1,000	–	48%	52%
Ipsos	7–8 Dec 2001	840	–	49%	51%
Sofres	6–7 Dec 2001	846	–	48%	52%
BVA	29 Nov–1 Dec 2001	608	–	50%	50%
Ifop	29–30 Nov 2001	943	–	49%	51%
Sofres	22–23 Nov 2001	1,000	–	49%	51%
CSA	14–15 Nov 2001	1,006	–	47%	53%
Ipsos	9–10 Nov 2001	927	–	47%	53%
BVA	25–27 Oct 2001	622	–	49%	51%
Ipsos	19–20 Oct 2001	829	–	48%	52%
Sofres	19–20 Oct 2001	1,000	–	48%	52%
CSA	17–18 Oct 2001	1,005	–	47%	53%
Ifop	11–12 Oct 2001	761	–	49%	51%
BVA	27–29 Sep 2001	704	–	49%	51%
CSA	11–12 Sep 2001	1,000	–	47%	53%
Sofres	7–8 Sep 2001	1,000	–	51%	49%
BVA	30 Aug–1 Sep 2001	634	–	49%	51%
CSA	16–17 Jul 2001	1,005	–	47%	53%
BVA	5–7 Jul 2001	571	–	52%	48%
Ifop	5–6 Jul 2001	826	–	50%	50%
Sofres	22–23 Jun 2001	1,000	–	51%	49%
CSA	20–21 Jun 2001	1,000	–	48%	52%
BVA	14–16 Jun 2001	652	–	49%	51%
Ipsos	8–9 Jun 2001	839	–	48%	52%
CSA	29–30 May 2001	900	–	49%	51%
Sofres	15–16 May 2001	840	–	50%	50%
BVA	10–12 May 2001	614	–	51%	49%
CSA	26–27 Apr 2001	922	–	47%	53%
Ifop	26–27 Apr 2001	831	–	51%	49%
BVA	20–21 Apr 2001	710	–	52%	48%
Sofres	28–29 Mar 2001	1,000	–	52%	48%
CSA	26 Mar 2001	1,000	–	49%	51%
BVA	22–24 Mar 2001	632	–	52%	48%
BVA	22–24 Feb 2001	628	–	52%	48%
Ifop	15–16 Feb 2001	805	–	51%	49%
Ipsos	9–10 Feb 2001	955	–	51%	49%
Sofres	2–3 Feb 2001	1,000	–	53%	47%
BVA	1–3 Feb 2001	654	–	54%	46%
BVA	11–13 Jan 2001	617	–	51%	49%
CSA	5–6 Jan 2001	1,000	–	54%	46%
Ipsos	5 Dec 2000	818	–	49%	51%
BVA	30 Nov–2 Dec 2000	945	–	51%	49%
Ifop	30 Nov–1 Dec 2000	947	–	51%	49%
CSA	14–15 Nov 2000	1,000	–	49%	51%
BVA	8–10 Nov 2000	597	–	53%	47%
Sofres	11–13 Oct 2000	1,000	–	52%	48%
BVA	6–8 Oct 2000	576	–	49%	51%
Ipsos	29–30 Sep 2000	939	–	51%	49%
Ifop	25 Sep 2000	804	–	49%	51%
BVA	7–9 Sep 2000	934	–	45%	55%
CSA	6–7 Sep 2000	1,000	–	48%	52%
Ifop	1–4 Sep 2000	982	–	49%	51%
BVA	20–22 Jul 2000	658	–	49%	51%
Ifop	6–7 Jul 2000	947	–	47%	53%
CSA	28–29 Jun 2000	1,000	–	51%	49%
BVA	15–17 Jun 2000	616	–	50%	50%
BVA	11–13 May 2000	680	–	47%	53%
CSA	10–13 May 2000	1,000	–	47%	53%
Ipsos	28–29 Apr 2000	825	–	48%	52%
Ifop	27–28 Apr 2000	952	–	47%	53%
BVA	13–15 Apr 2000	523	–	49%	51%
BVA	16–18 Mar 2000	984	–	50.5%	49.5%
Ipsos	10–11 Mar 2000	920	–	47%	53%
CSA	28–29 Feb 2000	1,000	–	48%	52%
BVA	17–19 Feb 2000	560	–	51%	49%
BVA	13–15 Jan 2000	545	–	51%	49%
Ifop	6–7 Jan 2000	943	–	51%	49%
CSA	4–5 Jan 2000	1,000	–	52%	48%
Sofres	27–29 Dec 1999	995	–	53%	47%
BVA	9–11 Dec 1999	573	–	53%	47%
BVA	18–20 Nov 1999	926	–	51%	49%
CSA	3–4 Nov 1999	1,000	–	52%	48%
BVA	14–16 Oct 1999	977	–	51%	49%
BVA	16–18 Sep 1999	671	–	52%	48%
CSA	1–2 Sep 1999	1,000	–	50%	50%
BVA	15–17 Jul 1999	574	–	48%	52%
CSA	1–2 Jul 1999	1,004	–	51%	49%
CSA	6–7 May 1999	1,002	–	46%	54%
Ifop	29–30 Apr 1999	953	–	50%	50%
CSA	5–6 Mar 1999	1,003	–	50%	50%
Ifop	4 Jan 1999	804	–	47%	53%
CSA	18–19 Dec 1998	1,006	–	49%	51%
BVA	10–13 Dec 1998	564	–	49%	51%
Ifop	4–5 Dec 1998	957	–	47%	53%
CSA	23–24 Oct 1998	1,003	–	50%	50%
CSA	21–22 Aug 1998	1,003	–	51%	49%
Ifop	3–4 Apr 1998	953	–	51%	49%
BVA	5–6 Dec 1997	964	–	56%	44%
Ifop	16–17 Oct 1997	950	–	53%	47%
CSA	18 Aug 1997	1,000	–	51%	49%
CSA	17–19 Apr 1996	1,000	–	49%	51%
BVA	26–27 Apr 1996	953	–	53%	47%
1995 election	7 May 1995	–	20.34%	47.36%	52.64%

==== By department ====
Paris

Polling firm	Fieldwork date	Sample size	Abs.	Jospin PS	Chirac RPR
Ipsos	20–21 Mar 2002	804	–	47%	53%
1995 election	7 May 1995	–	22.57%	39.83%	60.17%

Réunion

Polling firm	Fieldwork date	Sample size	Abs.	Jospin PS	Chirac RPR
Ipsos	25–26 Feb 2002	838	–	52%	48%
1995 election	7 May 1995	–	25.13%	56.00%	44.00%

=== Chevènement–Chirac ===
Polling firm	Fieldwork date	Sample size	Chevènement MDC	Chirac RPR
Sofres	6–7 Dec 2001	846	40%	60%
Ifop	29–30 Nov 2001	943	40%	60%

=== Jospin–Chevènement ===
Polling firm	Fieldwork date	Sample size	Jospin PS	Chevènement MDC
Sofres	6–7 Dec 2001	846	56%	44%

=== Aubry–Chirac ===
Polling firm	Fieldwork date	Sample size	Aubry PS	Chirac RPR
Sofres	11–13 Oct 2000	1,000	48%	52%

=== Jospin–Séguin ===
Polling firm	Fieldwork date	Sample size	Jospin PS	Séguin RPR
Sofres	11–13 Oct 2000	1,000	62%	38%

== See also ==
- Opinion polling for the French legislative election, 2002
- Opinion polling for the French presidential election, 2007
- Opinion polling for the French presidential election, 2012
- Opinion polling for the French presidential election, 2017
