= Fiona Lazaar =

French politician

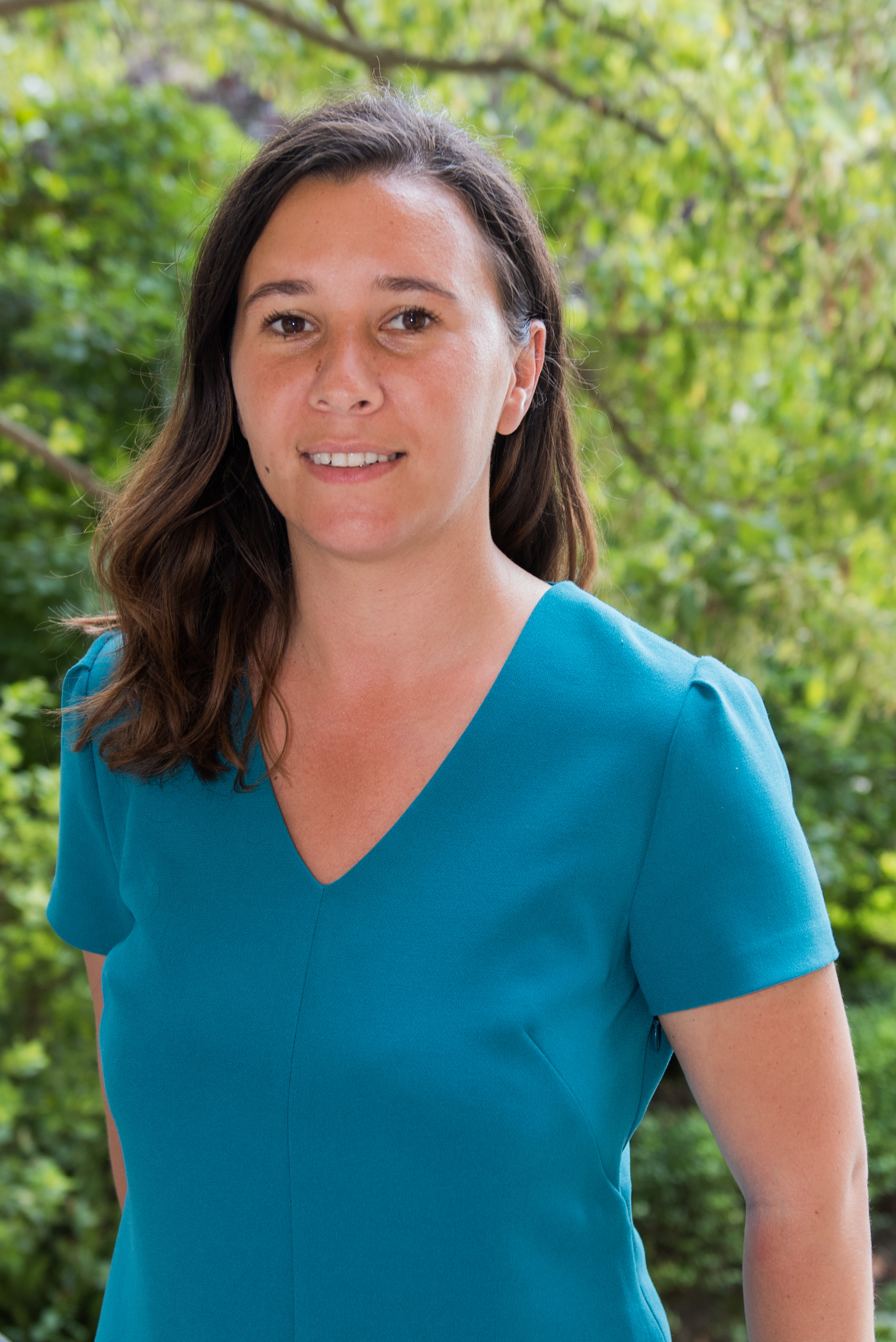

Member of the National Assembly for Val-d'Oise's 5th constituency
- In office 2017–2022
- Preceded by: Philippe Doucet
- Succeeded by: Paul Vannier

Personal details
- Born: 19 September 1985 (age 40) Val-d'Oise, France
- Party: The New Democrats

Fiona Lazaar (born 19 September 1985) is a French politician of The New Democrats who was elected to the French National Assembly on 18 June 2017 as a member of La République En Marche! (LREM), representing Val-d'Oise's 5th constituency. She left LREM and was one of the founding members of The New Democrats in 2020, but returned as an associate of LREM in 2021. She was defeated in the 2022 elections by Paul Vannier of La France Insoumise.

== Political career ==
In parliament, Lazaar served on the Committee on Foreign Affairs. In addition to her committee assignments, she was a member of the French-Singaporean Parliamentary Friendship Group.

From October 2018 to September 2020, Lazaar served as one of five deputy chairpersons of the LREM parliamentary group, under the leadership of chairman Gilles Le Gendre. In July 2019, she stood as a candidate for the chairmanship of the Committee on Social Affairs; she was defeated in the second round by the incumbent chairwoman, Brigitte Bourguignon.

In addition to her parliamentary work, Lazaar was appointed by Prime Minister Édouard Philippe to chair the National Council against Poverty and Social Exclusion (CNLE) in 2020.

Lazaar was one of the founding members of The New Democrats in 2020.

== Political positions ==
=== Domestic policy ===
Within LREM, Lazaar aligned with Aurélien Taché, Laetitia Avia and few others in challenging secularism.

In 2020, Lazaar went against her parliamentary group's majority and abstained from an important vote on a much discussed security bill drafted by her colleagues Alice Thourot and Jean-Michel Fauvergue that helped, among other measures, curtail the filming of police forces.

=== Economic policy ===
In July 2019, Lazaar voted in favor of the French ratification of the European Union’s Comprehensive Economic and Trade Agreement (CETA) with Canada.

== See also ==
- 2017 French legislative election
