= Paul Vannier =

French politician (born 1985)

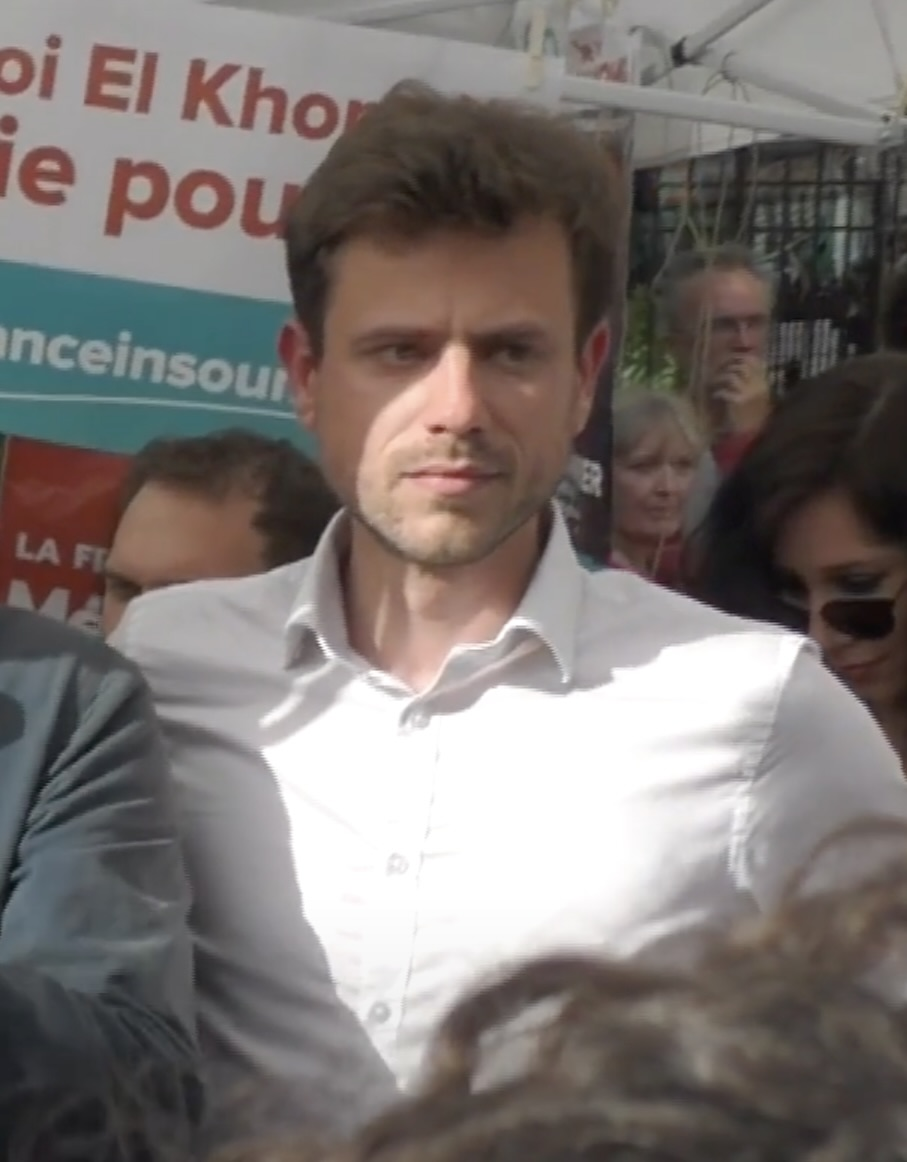

Member of the National Assembly for Val d'Oise's 5th constituency
- Incumbent
- Assumed office 22 June 2022
- Preceded by: Fiona Lazaar

Personal details
- Born: 19 September 1985 (age 40) Vitry-sur-Seine, France
- Party: La France Insoumise
- Other political affiliations: NUPES (2022); NFP (2024)

Paul Vannier (born 19 September 1985) is a French politician of La France Insoumise who has been representing Val d'Oise's 5th constituency in the National Assembly since 2022.

In the 2017 French legislative election, he was a candidate in Paris's 18th constituency. In the 2022 French legislative election he unseated En Marche MP Fiona Lazaar. He was re-elected in the 2024 French legislative election.

In November 2025, journalist Nora Bussigny filed a complaint against Vannier alleging a campaign of online harassment, endangering the lives of others, and criminal threats, which she said he had orchestrated via social media. Fifty Macronist MPs also filed a report concerning Vannier with the public prosecutor. Vannier had posted details of the journalist's private life and the address of Écran de veille's editorial office on social media following an article (Note: Note: The November 2025 Écran de veille article, relayed by Marianne, concerned a poll by IFOP about Muslims and their relationship to religion and Islamism. It notably reported increasing radicalisation among young Muslims in France.) that was criticised by LFI, and was not written by Bussigny.

In the aftermath of the posts, the outlet said it was forced to relocate due to violent threats, and Bussigny said she received numerous abusive messages, including racist, antisemitic, and sexist content.

== See also ==
- List of deputies of the 16th National Assembly of France
- List of deputies of the 17th National Assembly of France
