= Val-d'Oise's 5th constituency =

Constituency of the French Fifth Republic

5th constituency of Val-d'Oise
- inline Constituency of the National Assembly of France

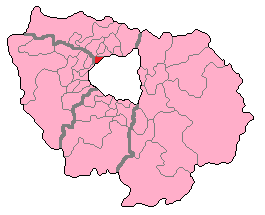
- Val-d'Oise's 5th Constituency shown within Île-de-France
- Deputy: Paul Vannier; LFI
- Department: Val-d'Oise
- Cantons: Argenteuil-Est - Argenteuil-Nord - Argenteuil-Ouest - Bezons
- Registered voters: 68,483

The 5th constituency of Val-d'Oise is a French legislative constituency in the Val-d'Oise département. It is currently represented by Paul Vannier (LFI).

== Description ==
The 5th constituency of Val-d'Oise covers the large suburban town of Argenteuil in the south of the department. The town which sits on the north bank of the Seine opposite Colombes and close to Nanterre both of which form large parts of Paris's north western suburbs.

Politically the seat is marginal and control of it has swung between left and right in line with the national trend. The seat is notable for once being held by former French Communist Party leader Robert Hue.

== Historic Representation ==
Election	Member	Party
1967	Henry Canacos	PCF
1968	Solange Troisier	UDR
1973	Henry Canacos	PCF
1978	Henry Canacos	PCF
1981	Michel Coffineau	PS
1986	Proportional representation – no election by constituency	
1988	Robert Montdargent	PCF
1993	Georges Mothron	RPR
1997	Robert Hue	PCF
2002	Georges Mothron	UMP
2007	Georges Mothron	UMP
2012	Philippe Doucet	PS
2017	Fiona Lazaar	LREM
2020	Fiona Lazaar	LND
2022	Paul Vannier	LFI

== Election results ==
=== 2024 ===
Candidate	Party	Alliance	First round			Second round		
Candidate	Party	Alliance	Votes	%	+/–	Votes	%	+/–
Paul Vannier	LFI	NFP	23,308	56.01	+9.03			
Quentin Hoarau	RN		7,784	18.70	+7.03			
Fatima Liliyaje	RE	ENS	5,389	12.95	-8.07			
Boualem Meziane	LR		3,170	7.62	-2.15			
Dominique Mariette	LO		558	1.34	0.74			
Dominique Lesueur	DIV		555	1.33	N/A			
Gilbert Pham	UDI		412	0.99	N/A			
Thès Baleur	DVD		251	0.60	N/A			
Jean-Baptiste Poiaghi	NPA		189	0.45	N/A			
Valid votes			41,616	97.75	-0.07			
Blank votes			631	1.48	-0.13			
Null votes			329	0.77	+0.20			
Turnout			42,576	60.10	+20.14			
Abstentions			28,267	39.90	-20.14			
Registered voters			70,843					
Source: Ministry of the Interior, Le Monde
Result						LFI HOLD		

=== 2022 ===
Legislative Election 2022: Val-d'Oise's 5th constituency
Party	Candidate	Votes	%	±%
LFI (NUPÉS)	Paul Vannier	11,218	44.80	+3.73
LREM (Ensemble)	Fiona Lazaar	5,264	21.02	-8.93
RN	Fabienne Daumas	2,921	11.67	+1.79
LR (UDC)	Gilles Savry	2,447	9.77	−3.39
EXD	Stéphanie Henry	822	3.28	N/A
DVG	Dienabou Kouyate	546	2.18	N/A
EXG	Dominique Mariette	522	2.08	N/A
Others	N/A	1,299		
Turnout		25,598	36.96	−3.37
2nd round result
LFI (NUPÉS)	Paul Vannier	15,645	63.71	+23.43
LREM (Ensemble)	Fiona Lazaar	8,913	36.29	−23.43
Turnout		24,558	37.34	+3.19
LFI gain from LREM				

=== 2017 ===
Candidate	Label	First round		Second round	
Candidate	Label	Votes	%	Votes	%
Fiona Lazaar	REM	7,975	29.95	12,523	59.72
Philippe Doucet	PS	4,514	16.95	8,447	40.28
Françoise Pacha-Stiegler	FI	3,658	13.74		
Gilles Savry	LR	3,506	13.16		
Pierre Renucci	FN	2,630	9.88		
Dominique Lesparre	PCF	2,118	7.95		
Pascal Bertolini	ECO	647	2.43		
Fabrice David	ECO	455	1.71		
Dominique Mariette	EXG	440	1.65		
Franck Debeaud	DVD	249	0.93		
Leïla Louchart	DIV	226	0.85		
Stanley Paraison	DIV	167	0.63		
Souad Aumigny	ECO	47	0.18		
Votes		26,632	100.00	20,970	100.00
Valid votes		26,632	97.80	20,970	89.68
Blank votes		434	1.59	1,737	7.43
Null votes		165	0.61	677	2.90
Turnout		27,231	39.76	23,384	34.15
Abstentions		41,252	60.24	45,100	65.85
Registered voters		68,483		68,484	
Source: Ministry of the Interior

=== 2012 ===
Legislative Election 2012: Val-d'Oise's 5th constituency
Party	Candidate	Votes	%	±%
PS	Philippe Doucet	12,929	38.23	
UMP	Georges Mothron	9,301	27.50	
FG	Dominique Lesparre	4,475	13.23	
FN	Aurélie Thomas	3,938	11.65	
EELV	Anne Gellé	920	2.72	
Others	N/A	2,253		
Turnout		33,816	49.67	
2nd round result
PS	Philippe Doucet	19,441	59.27	
UMP	Georges Mothron	13,362	40.73	
Turnout		32,803	48.19	
PS gain from UMP				

=== 2007 ===
Legislative Election 2007: Val-d'Oise's 5th constituency
Party	Candidate	Votes	%	±%
UMP	Georges Mothron	13,980	41.13	
PS	Faouzi Lamdaoui	9,103	26.78	
PCF	Bernard Calabuig	2,387	7.02	
MoDem	Françoise Inghelaere	1,773	5.22	
FN	Micheline Bruna	1,703	5.01	
Far left	Homar Slaouti	1,077	3.17	
Far left	Agnès Bernard	692	2.04	
Others	N/A	3,273		
Turnout		34,596	53.99	
2nd round result
UMP	Georges Mothron	16,983	51.01	
PS	Faouzi Lamdaoui	16,309	48.99	
Turnout		34,418	53.71	
UMP hold				

=== 2002 ===
Legislative Election 2002: Val-d'Oise's 5th constituency
Party	Candidate	Votes	%	±%
PCF	Robert Hue	12,866	38.63	
UMP	Georges Mothron	11,835	35.53	
FN	Micheline Bruna	4,790	14.38	
LCR	Pierre Mirsalis	745	2.24	
PR	Mohamed Smaoun	677	2.03	
Others	N/A	2,397		
Turnout		33,868	60.76	
2nd round result
UMP	Georges Mothron	16,150	50.38	
PCF	Robert Hue	15,906	49.62	
Turnout		32,956	59.12	
UMP gain from PCF				

=== 1997 ===
Legislative Election 1997: Val-d'Oise's 5th constituency
Party	Candidate	Votes	%	±%
PCF	Robert Hue	11,377	30.40	
RPR	Georges Mothron	7,376	19.71	
FN	Michel Bischoff	6,971	18.62	
PS	Manuel Valls	6,484	17.32	
LO	Patrice Crunil	1,020	2.73	
Far right	Louis Girard	968	2.59	
GE	Emmanuel Thieblemont	830	2.22	
DVE	Michel Alborghetti	822	2.20	
Others	N/A	1,582		
Turnout		38,563	65.33	
2nd round result
PCF	Robert Hue	20,974	57.05	
RPR	Georges Mothron	15,788	42.95	
Turnout		39,304	66.59	
PCF gain from RPR				

== Sources ==
Official results of French elections from 2002: "Résultats électoraux officiels en France" (in French).
