= Georges Labazée =

French politician (1943–2022)

Georges Labazée (16 June 1943 – 4 February 2022) was a French politician. He was a senator from 2011 to 2017. Born in France, Labazée died on 4 February 2022, at the age of 78.
