= Georges Mothron =

French politician

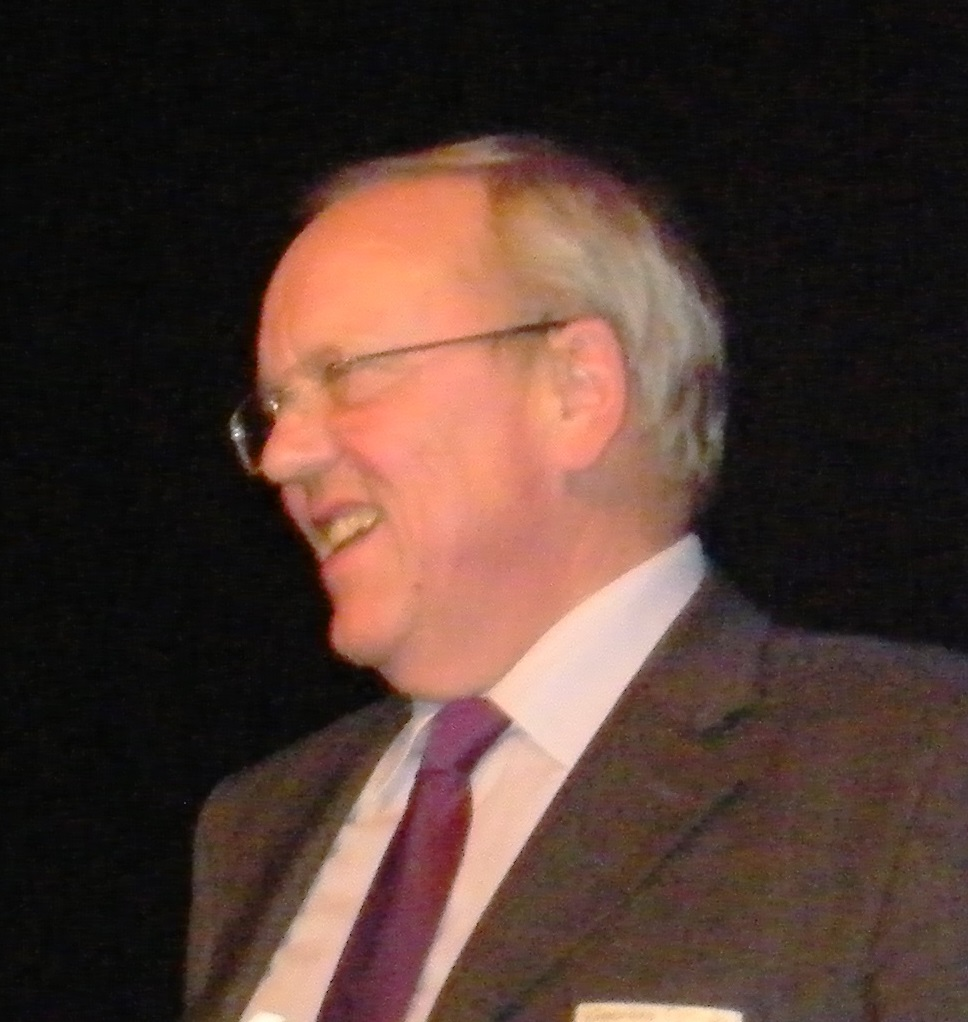
- portrait of Georges Mothron

Mayor of Argenteuil
- Incumbent
- Assumed office 5 April 2014
- Preceded by: Philippe Doucet

Member of the National Assembly for Val-d'Oise's 5th constituency
- In office 2002–2012
- Preceded by: Robert Hue
- Succeeded by: Philippe Doucet

Personal details
- Born: 5 April 1948 (age 78) Argenteuil, France
- Party: The Republicans

Georges Mothron (born April 5, 1948 in Argenteuil) is a former member of the National Assembly of France. He represented the Val-d'Oise department, and is a member of the Republicans.
