= Rally for France =

Rassemblement pour la France
- Founders: Charles Pasqua; Philippe de Villiers
- Founded: 1999
- Dissolved: 2011
- Split from: Rally for the Republic
- Headquarters: RPF 129, avenue Charles de Gaulle; 92521 Neuilly-sur-Seine Cedex
- Ideology: National conservatism Gaullism; Souverainism; French nationalism Euroscepticism
- Political position: Right-wing
- National affiliation: Union for a Popular Movement
- European affiliation: Alliance for Europe of the Nations (2002–2009)
- Colours: Blue

Website
- rpf-site.fr

The Rally for France (French: Rassemblement pour la France (RPF); also briefly known in 2003 as Rally for France and European Independence or Rassemblement pour la France et l'Indépendance de l'Europe) was a right-wing political party in France. It was founded in 1999 by Gaullist former Interior Minister Charles Pasqua, then allied with Philippe de Villiers (ex-UDF). The RPF aimed to fight against globalisation and European federalism. The party was opposed to further European integration.

The new party enjoyed early electoral success when it placed second in the 1999 European Parliament election in France, scoring 13 percent of the vote and winning 13 seats. This placed it behind the Socialist Party but ahead of the established centre-right parties, the Rally for the Republic–Liberal Democracy list and the UDF. However, Philippe de Villiers's departure in late 2000, in order to refound his Movement for France, severely damaged the party and Pasqua failed to run in the 2002 presidential elections.

Furthermore, the RPF suffered several setbacks in various elections and failed to regain much of its 1999–2000 momentum. The party won two seats in the 2002 legislative election through an alliance with the UMP but lost all of its MEPs in the 2004 European election. Pasqua was elected a senator for Hauts-de-Seine in the 2004 French Senate election. He sat in the UMP group.

The RPF remained an associate party of the UMP until its dissolution in 2011.

== See also ==
- Movement for France
- Rally of the French People
