= Robert Hue =

French politician (born 1946)

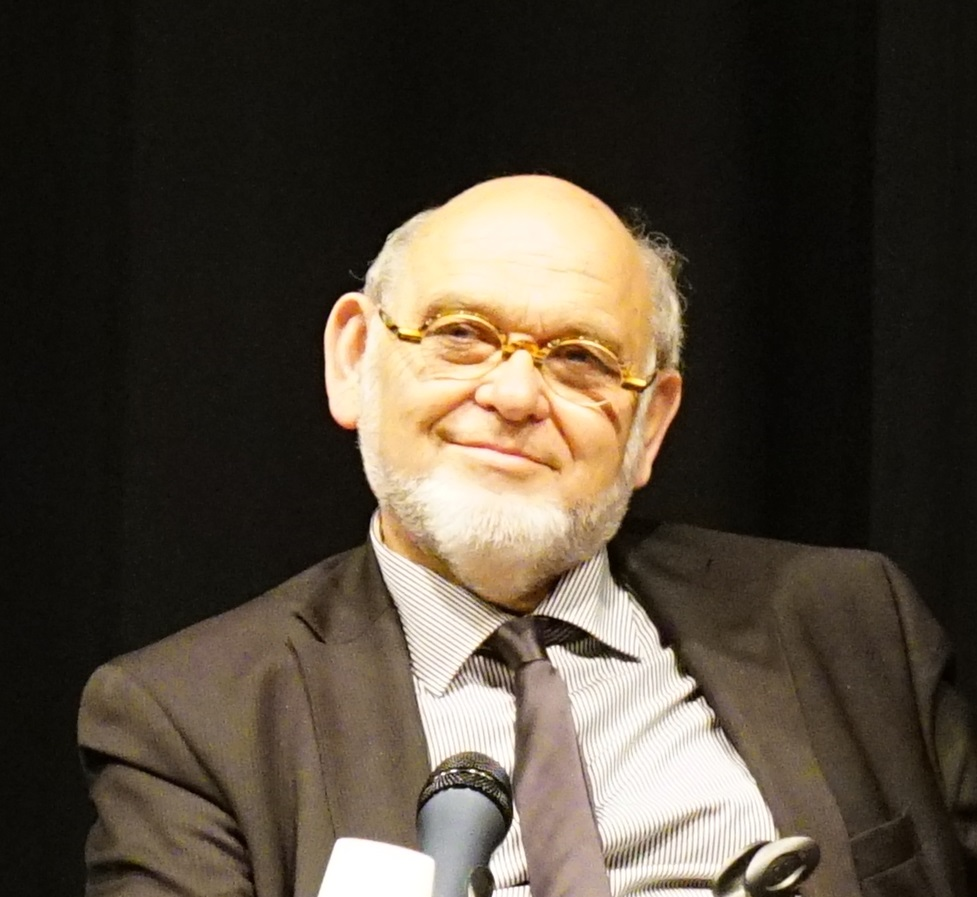

Member of the French Senate for Val-d'Oise
- In office 1 October 2004 – 1 October 2017
- Preceded by: Marie-Claude Beaudeau

Member of the National Assembly for Val-d'Oise's 5th constituency
- In office 12 June 1997 – 19 June 2002
- Preceded by: Georges Mothron
- Succeeded by: Georges Mothron

National Secretary of the French Communist Party
- In office 29 January 1994 – 28 October 2001
- Preceded by: Georges Marchais
- Succeeded by: Marie-George Buffet

Personal details
- Born: Robert Georges Auguste Hue; 19 October 1946 (age 80) Cormeilles-en-Parisis, France
- Party: PCF
- Spouse: Marie-Édith
- Children: 2
- Profession: Orderly

Robert Hue (French pronunciation: [ʁɔbɛʁ y]; born 19 October 1946) is a French politician who was National Secretary of the French Communist Party (PCF) from 1994 to 2001 and President of the PCF from 2001 to 2002. He served as a Deputy in the National Assembly of France from 1997 to 2002, and he has served in the Senate of France between 2004 and 2017.

Hue was a candidate in the 1995 presidential election, in which he received 8.7% of the vote, and in the 2002 presidential election, in which he won 3.37%.

He is married to Marie-Édith, and he is father of two (Charles and Cécilia).

== Early activities ==
Hue was born in Cormeilles-en-Parisis, Val-d'Oise in 1946. His family professed Communist beliefs, and Hue, as a child, sold issues of the Party newspaper, L'Humanité. He studied at the technical school in Cormeilles-en-Parisis, sang in a rock band called Les Rapaces under the alias Willy Barton, and practiced judo (winning an intercollegiate medal and receiving a black belt nidan).

Age sixteen (1962), he entered the youth section of the PCF, and then the Party itself. After studying in Paris and becoming an orderly, he was employed in a psychiatrical institution in Argenteuil.

Close to Georges Marchais, Hue climbed the steps in the Party hierarchy, being also elected mayor of Montigny-lès-Cormeilles in 1977. He was to be reelected for all possible terms, until 2001. In February 1981, he was brought briefly under the spotlight, by starting a campaign against a family of immigrants, whom he had accused of selling drugs (a "charge" that was based mainly on hearsay). This seemed strange to the public opinion in France, as Hue had been (and was to remain) a strict follower of the Party lines.

In 1987, Hue joined the Party's Central Committee and, in 1990, its Politburo. At that time, he presided the National association of Communist elects. In 1994, while still largely unknown, Hue was appointed successor by Georges Marchais. Hue changed the office of Secretary General to "National Secretary" in an effort to refresh the party's image. He did become quite well known only a few hours later, when he uttered a famous lapsus linguae: I'm not nobody's pawn.

== Hue and Party reform ==
After the fall of the Berlin Wall, faced with the rapid erosion of his party, Robert Hue started a series of political transformations: openness to other political movements, discarding of several doctrines, a double-headed Party executive (with Hue as president and Marie-George Buffet as national secretary), etc. He made his approach public through his book, Communisme : la mutation.

Hue joined Lionel Jospin's government and expressed willingness to allow state-run enterprises to receive non-state resources. Hue was described as someone looking to shift the party away from its Soviet-era habits after the fall of communism. Hue also encouraged tax incentives for business tied to their hiring practices and for leaning into what he called France's strength of nuclear energy.

Robert Hue's low percentage in 1995 is explained by the competition from Workers' Struggle, but it was still more than André Lajoinie's result in 1988. In 1997, he stood by the idea of Gauche Plurielle ("Pluralist Left") which brought the leftist politics back in power with Lionel Jospin; Hue became a deputy, and the government included a number of Communists.

However, the Party was falling out of favor with the public: from over 200,000 members in 1998, it dropped to 138,000 in 2001. The Party lost a good deal of allegiances during the 2001 municipal elections.

Hue created and assumed in 2001 the title of President of the Party. His successor as National secretary of the party was Marie-George Buffet.

The poor result in 2002 made the far-right leader Jean-Marie Le Pen cheer the death of Communist strength. In fact, the outcome was so bad that the Party did not have anything to show for the money it had invested in its campaign, and verged on financial collapse. Hue resigned the Presidency while the Party appealed to the generosity of its members. The Presidency was abolished, the National Secretary (Buffet) remaining as the Party's sole leader.

== Political career ==
European Parliament

Member of European Parliament : 1999-2000 (Resignation). Elected in 1999.

National Assembly of France

Member of the National Assembly of France for Val d'Oise : 1997–2002. Elected in 1997.

Senate of France

Senator of Val-d'Oise : Since 2004. Elected in 2004.

Regional Council

Regional councillor of Île-de-France : 1986-1988 (Resignation) / 1992-1993 (Resignation). Reelected in 1992.

General Council

General councillor of Val-d'Oise : 1988-1998 (Resignation). Reelected in 1994.

Municipal Council

Mayor of Montigny-lès-Cormeilles : 1977-2009 (Resignation). Reelected in 1983, 1989, 1995, 2001, 2008.

Municipal councillor of Montigny-lès-Cormeilles : 1977-2009 (Resignation). Reelected in 1983, 1989, 1995, 2001, 2008.

Political functions

President of the French Communist Party : 2001–2002.

National Secretary of the French Communist Party : 1994–2001.

== Works ==
- Histoire d'un village du Parisis des origines à la Révolution (1981)
- Du village à la ville (1986)
- Montigny pendant la Révolution (1989)
- Communisme : la mutation (1995)
- Il faut qu'on se parle (1997)
- Communisme : un nouveau projet (1999)

Party political offices
Preceded by Georges Marchais	National Secretary of the French Communist Party; 1994–2001	Succeeded by Marie-George Buffet
Preceded by none - position created	President of the French Communist Party; 2001–2002	Succeeded by none - position abolished
