= French election 2012 =

French election 2012 may refer to:

- 2012 French presidential election
- 2012 French legislative election
