= 2012 French elections =

2012 French elections may refer to:

- 2012 French presidential election
- 2012 French legislative election
