= Plan General de Ordenación Urbana =

Plan General de Ordenación Urbana (English: General Urban Ordinance Plan; PGOU) are the urban plans produced by municipalities in Spain and agreed to by the various regional governments. There are strict national guidelines for these town plans. Within a PGOU there are various zones showing the density of build and whether the area is designated as residential or commercial. The plans are readily available for inspection at the relevant Spanish town hall, along with the relevant normativas or planning rules for that area. New PGOUs and changes to a PGOU have to be advertised in the local press to allow for residents to be informed and to give them the chance to disagree or complain.

== See also ==
- Law on Solidarity and Urban Renewal
