= Law on Solidarity and Urban Renewal =

French statute

SRU Law

11th legislature of the Fifth French Republic
- Long title: Law on urban solidarity and renewal
- Citation: Act No. 2000-1208
- Territorial extent: France
- Enacted: December 13, 2000
- Effective: December 14, 2000
- Status: Current legislation

Law No. 2000-1208 of December 13, 2000, on Solidarity and Urban Renewal (SRU Law), is a French statute that significantly reformed urban planning and housing policy. Enacted under the government of Lionel Jospin and introduced by Minister of Infrastructure and Housing Jean-Claude Gayssot, it was published in the Journal Officiel on December 14, 2000.

The law’s most notable provision, Article 55—codified in Articles L. 302-5 and subsequent sections of the Code de la Construction et de l’Habitation (CCH)—requires certain large municipalities to maintain a minimum proportion of social housing. It applies to municipalities with more than 1,500 inhabitants in the Île-de-France region and more than 3,500 inhabitants elsewhere, located within an urban area of over 50,000 inhabitants that includes at least one municipality of more than 15,000 inhabitants. These municipalities must ensure that at least 20% of their housing stock consists of social housing, a rate increased to 25% by the law of January 18, 2013, on the mobilization of public land for housing and the strengthening of social housing production obligations, known as the Duflot I Law.

== Orientation ==
The SRU Law of December 13, 2000, resulted from a national debate launched in 1999 under the theme “Living, Moving… Living the City,” which emphasized the need for better coordination between urban planning and transportation policies within a sustainable development framework. Six debates, held in Orléans, Perpignan, Nîmes, Lille, Dijon, and Lyon, brought together between 60 and 80 participants, including residents, experts, and representatives of administrative bodies such as the General Council of Bridges and Highways, DATAR, the Interministerial Delegation for the City, and various prefectures. Several government ministers also took part, including Jean-Claude Gayssot, Louis Besson, Dominique Voynet, and Jean-Pierre Chevènement. The discussions addressed the expansion of urban areas beyond their traditional boundaries, the challenges faced by historic city centers, and the growing demand for modern transport infrastructure. They concluded that addressing generational, geographic, and social divides was essential to fostering greater cohesion within urban environments.

It also introduced the concepts of environmental protection and urban management in the public interest, in favor of sustainable development. (Note: Art. L-121-1: The territorial coherence plan and land use plans, among other things, must ensure: "2° The diversity of urban functions and social diversity (...) in the public interest, (...) taking into account (...) means of transport. (...) "3° Economical and balanced use of natural, urban, peri-urban, and rural areas, control of travel and motor vehicle traffic needs, preservation of air, water, soil, and subsoil quality, ecosystems, green spaces, environments, sites, and natural or urban landscapes, reduction of noise pollution, preservation of remarkable urban areas and built heritage, prevention of foreseeable natural risks, technological risks, pollution, and nuisances of all kinds." According to the original text of Law No. 2000-1208 of December 13, 2000.)

== Content ==
The SRU Law had an impact in five areas: urban planning law, social diversity, transportation, social landlords, and civil law.

- In urban planning law:
  - Master Plans (SD) were replaced by Territorial Coherence Schemes (SCOT);
  - Land Use Plans (POS) were replaced by Local Urban Plans (PLU), with a more political dimension to city planning through the introduction of the Project for Development and Sustainable Planning (PADD);
  - Zone Development Plans (PAZ) were abolished to eliminate the notion that development zones (ZAC) could be urbanized outside local planning frameworks.
  - As part of a sustainable development approach, the SRU Law aimed to encourage the reduction of non-urbanized land consumption and suburban sprawl by promoting the controlled densification of already urbanized areas. This included limiting the minimum size of buildable lots and eliminating the requirement for administrative approval of land divisions that did not constitute subdivisions.
- Article 55 of the SRU Law established a requirement for municipalities with more than 3,500 inhabitants (or 1,500 in Île-de-France) located within an urban area of over 50,000 inhabitants—including at least one municipality of more than 15,000 inhabitants (Note: Section 55 of the Act.)—to ensure that at least 20% of their housing stock consists of social housing. (Note: Per capita fiscal potential is defined in Article L. 2334-4 of the General Code for Local Authorities.) This obligation applies at the intercommunal level when a local housing program (programme local de l’habitat) is in place. Municipalities whose populations have declined between the two most recent INSEE censuses are exempt from this requirement. Codified in Article L. 302-5 of the Code de la Construction et de l’Habitation (CCH), this provision allows non-compliant municipalities to pay an annual financial contribution instead of meeting the target. According to Article L. 302-7 of the CCH, the contribution corresponds to 20% of the municipality’s fiscal capacity per inhabitant, multiplied by the percentage of missing social housing, and is capped at 5% of the previous year’s actual operating expenditures. In practice, several municipalities have opted to pay this contribution, citing constraints such as limited available land or high land prices. Others have opposed the construction of social housing within their territories. Critics have noted that the financial penalty is often insufficient to serve as an effective deterrent.

Several associations and elected officials, primarily from left-leaning political groups, have proposed making mayors who fail to comply with the SRU Law’s social housing requirements ineligible for re-election. They argue that noncompliance can weaken national and regional housing solidarity and contribute to the spatial concentration of disadvantaged populations in certain urban areas.

- In the area of transportation, the SRU Law promoted measures aimed at reducing automobile use in zones adequately served by public transport, including limitations on the number of parking spaces at shopping centers and multiplex cinemas. It reformed the governance of the Île-de-France Transport Authority (STIF) by including the Regional Council on its Board of Directors and granting it the presidency of the authority. Following Law No. 2004-809 of August 13, 2004, the Regional Council assumed leadership of STIF, responsible for coordinating transport in Île-de-France. The law allowed the authority to delegate most powers—excluding fare policy—to municipalities bordering Paris, and from 2004 onward, even non-bordering municipalities could receive such delegation. Additionally, the law authorized the RATP to create subsidiaries to participate in international tenders and provided for the transfer of regional express train (TER) management to the Regional Councils, while granting professional subscribers access to all trains except those requiring reservations, primarily high-speed trains (TGV). (Note: In certain regions where TER trains are few and far between, a degree of tolerance exists. This is the case in Poitou-Charentes, which benefits from an exemption until the opening of the high-speed line scheduled for 2016.)
- Social housing providers (HLM, OPAC, etc.) saw their missions redefined and expanded.
- In terms of civil law, the main developments were as follows:
  - For co-ownership: requirement of a technical diagnosis before the division of a building into co-ownership, bringing co-ownership regulations into compliance, opening a separate bank account, modification of the voting majorities provided for in Articles 25 and 26, increased sanctions for defaulting co-owners, and a reform of the regime for co-ownerships in financial difficulty;
  - For real estate sales: various modifications, including land boundary surveys, a seven-day withdrawal period, asbestos diagnosis, and others;
  - For rental leases: the obligation for the landlord to provide a decent dwelling.

== Evolution of Article 55 ==
The provisions known as “Article 55 of the SRU Law” correspond to Articles L. 302-5 to L. 302-9-2 of the French Construction and Housing Code. These articles were established or amended by Article 55 of the SRU Law and by several subsequent legislative measures.

At the end of January 2006, the National Assembly modified the social housing provisions through the adoption of an amendment proposed by Patrick Ollier and Gérard Hamel during the first reading of the National Commitment for Housing bill (ENL Law). This amendment allowed certain social homeownership programs to be counted as social housing. The Senate later removed these measures in early April 2006.

On May 30, 2006, during the second reading of the ENL bill in the National Assembly, Patrick Ollier introduced another amendment aimed at adjusting the 20% social housing requirement for 740 municipalities, with the stated purpose of facilitating access to homeownership.

Article 55 of the SRU Law was amended by Article 65 of the National Commitment for Housing Law of July 13, 2006.

The implementation of measures by the National Urban Renewal Agency (ANRU), introduced through the Social Cohesion Law (commonly referred to as the Borloo Law), modified the incentives established by the SRU Law by permitting municipalities within the same urban community to transfer portions of their social housing obligations from one municipality to another.

On July 10, 2008, Christine Boutin presented her housing access bill. The Boutin Bill, which sought to relax the SRU Law, outlined four main priorities:

1. to build more housing,
2. to promote popular access to homeownership,
3. to expand access to the HLM housing stock to a larger number of people,
4. to combat substandard housing.

Following parliamentary debate and revisions, the bill was enacted as Law No. 2009-323 of March 25, 2009, on Mobilization for Housing and the Fight against Exclusion, commonly referred to as the Molle Law or Boutin Law.

Article 123 of this law, which required transport authorities to provide half-price tickets to individuals with incomes below a social security–defined threshold, was codified under Article L1113-1 of the Transport Code.

Article 10 of the Law of January 18, 2013, known as the Duflot I Law—concerning the mobilization of public land for housing and the strengthening of obligations for social housing production—raised the minimum social rental housing requirement from 20% to 25%.

== Article 55: Non-Compliant Municipalities ==
In 2008, among 730 municipalities with less than 20% social housing, 330 did not meet their construction targets.

The 2014–2016 report indicated that cumulative catch-up targets for municipalities subject to the SRU system were exceeded, reaching 188,587 housing units, or 106% of the total objectives. However, of the 1,152 municipalities under the system, 649 did not achieve the production levels mandated by law, and more than 200 municipalities were recommended for deficiency proceedings.

In January 2025, Frédéric Vassy, mayor of Châteauneuf-sur-Isère, announced his resignation, citing the difficulty of reaching the 25% social housing target. He noted that the municipality includes a protected agricultural zone (ZAP), where social housing construction is prohibited, and reported that the municipality paid annual fines of approximately 80,000 euros for not meeting the quotas.

=== Île-de-France ===
According to the Regional Housing Committee, 44% of municipalities in Île-de-France (83 out of 181) did not meet the SRU law requirement of 20% social housing for the 2005–2007 period. Seventy-seven of these municipalities were subject to potential increased fines following a “deficiency order,” with the amount determined by the gap between the number of social housing units built and the number required.

Among the municipalities with the largest shortfalls were Neuilly-sur-Seine (Hauts-de-Seine), which completed 378 of 774 required units (48.8%), Le Raincy (Seine-Saint-Denis) at 26.7%, and Lésigny (Seine-et-Marne).

=== Côte d’Azur ===
The 25% social housing rate required by law applies to primary residences and is expected to be reached by 2025. The Alpes-Maritimes department, along with Paris and the Paris region, is classified as a “high-pressure zone” in metropolitan France due to the shortage of social housing, with 27 out of 36 municipalities not meeting their obligations. Similarly, in the Var department, where the average social housing rate is 9%, 20 of the 24 municipalities also fail to comply. This local situation has been highlighted by regional media, such as the satirical newspaper Le Ravi, which in its “annual ranking of cities to avoid” uses the proportion of social housing as one of its indicators. According to this ranking, municipalities with fewer social housing units are considered less desirable, which tends to penalize cities in the eastern part of the region.

Departmental prefectures have established criteria under which municipalities can avoid paying fines, as provided by law. As a result, the application of penalties appears uneven. For example, in the Alpes-Maritimes, Antibes, with a social housing rate of 9.69%, pays nearly €826,000 in penalties, while Cagnes-sur-Mer, at 6.39%, pays none. Menton, with 8.82%, is declared deficient, whereas Nice, at 12.67%, is not considered deficient and incurs no penalty. Conversely, Carros, with a rate of 22.49%, pays over €36,000 in fines. In the Var, Toulon, with a completion rate of 15.41%, is considered exempt from any levy and does not incur financial sanctions.

== Assessment ==
After twenty years of implementation, approximately half of the 1.8 million new social housing units constructed since the SRU law came into force were built in municipalities subject to the law. However, 600,000 units are still required for all municipalities to meet their obligations by 2025. During the 2017–2019 period, of the 1,035 municipalities subject to the requirement, 485 met their quantitative and qualitative targets, while 550 did not. Overall, the total number of social housing units built during this period exceeded the combined municipal targets, as some municipalities surpassed their goals.

According to the newspaper Le Monde, the SRU law has not succeeded in integrating wealthy and low-income households within the same neighborhoods. Citing the Institute for Advanced Studies in Housing Action (Idheal), it notes that while the law improved the geographical distribution of social housing across urban municipalities, it did not reduce income disparities between neighborhoods or reverse the broader trend of increasing segregation between areas of wealth and poverty.

Geographer Grégoire Fauconnier, who authored a doctoral thesis on the subject, considers that the SRU law contributed to increasing social housing construction in municipalities that previously had little, but that the social diversity intended by the legislation has not been fully achieved due to practices that circumvent its objectives. His conclusions are consistent with those of other researchers. In 2006, Philippe Subra and Didier Desponds highlighted implementation challenges arising from the opposition of local officials and residents. Political scientist Fabien Desage observed that mayors of municipalities subject to the law often construct social housing only after ensuring control over the allocation process, prioritizing households from their own municipality. Such practices limit the law’s intended desegregation effects.

== See also ==
- Plan General de Ordenación Urbana
