= 2012 French presidential election =

Election of François Hollande

- 22 April 2012 (first round); 6 May 2012 (second round)
- Turnout: 79.48% (first round) ▼4.29 pp 80.35% (second round) ▼3.62 pp
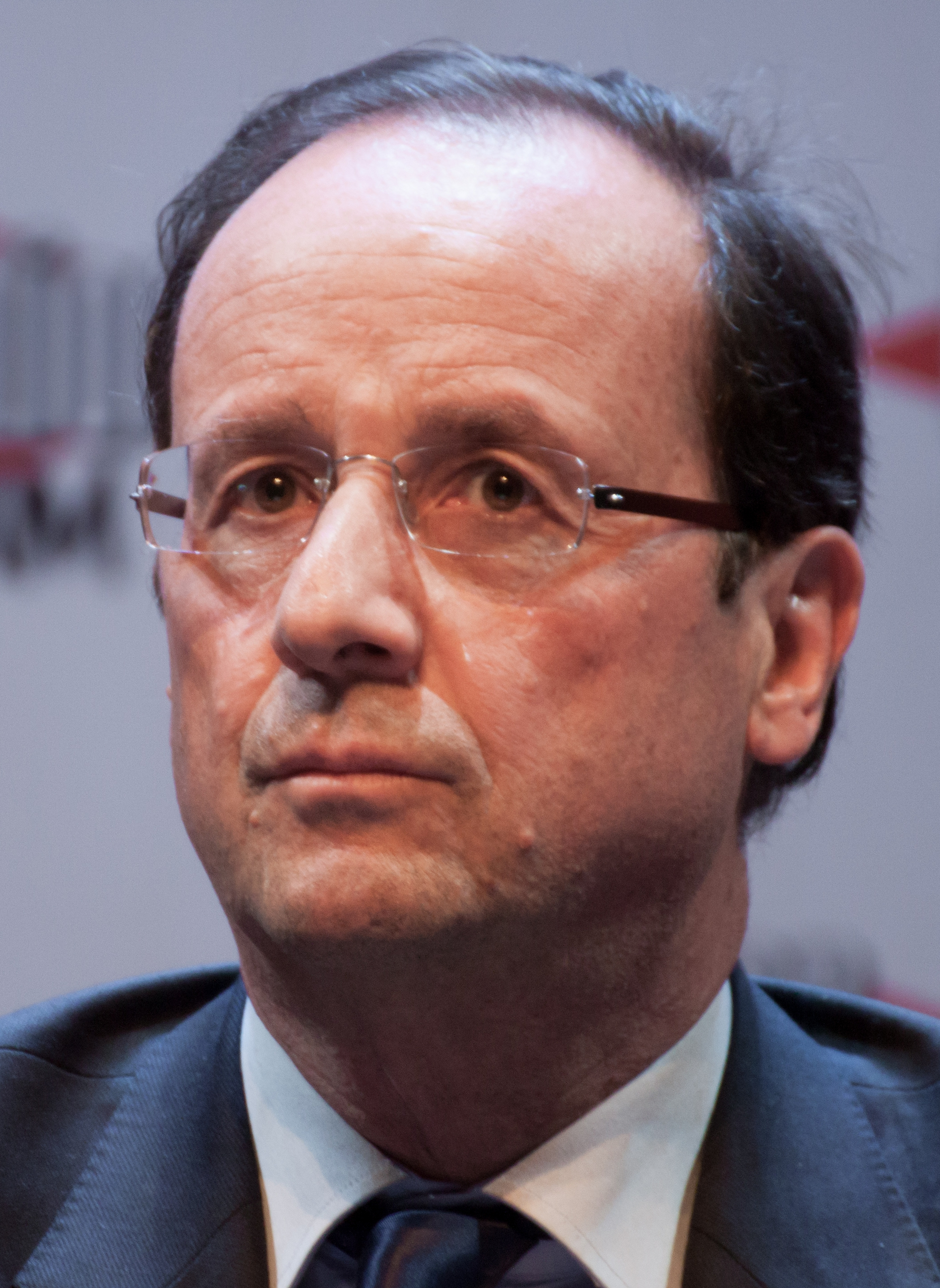

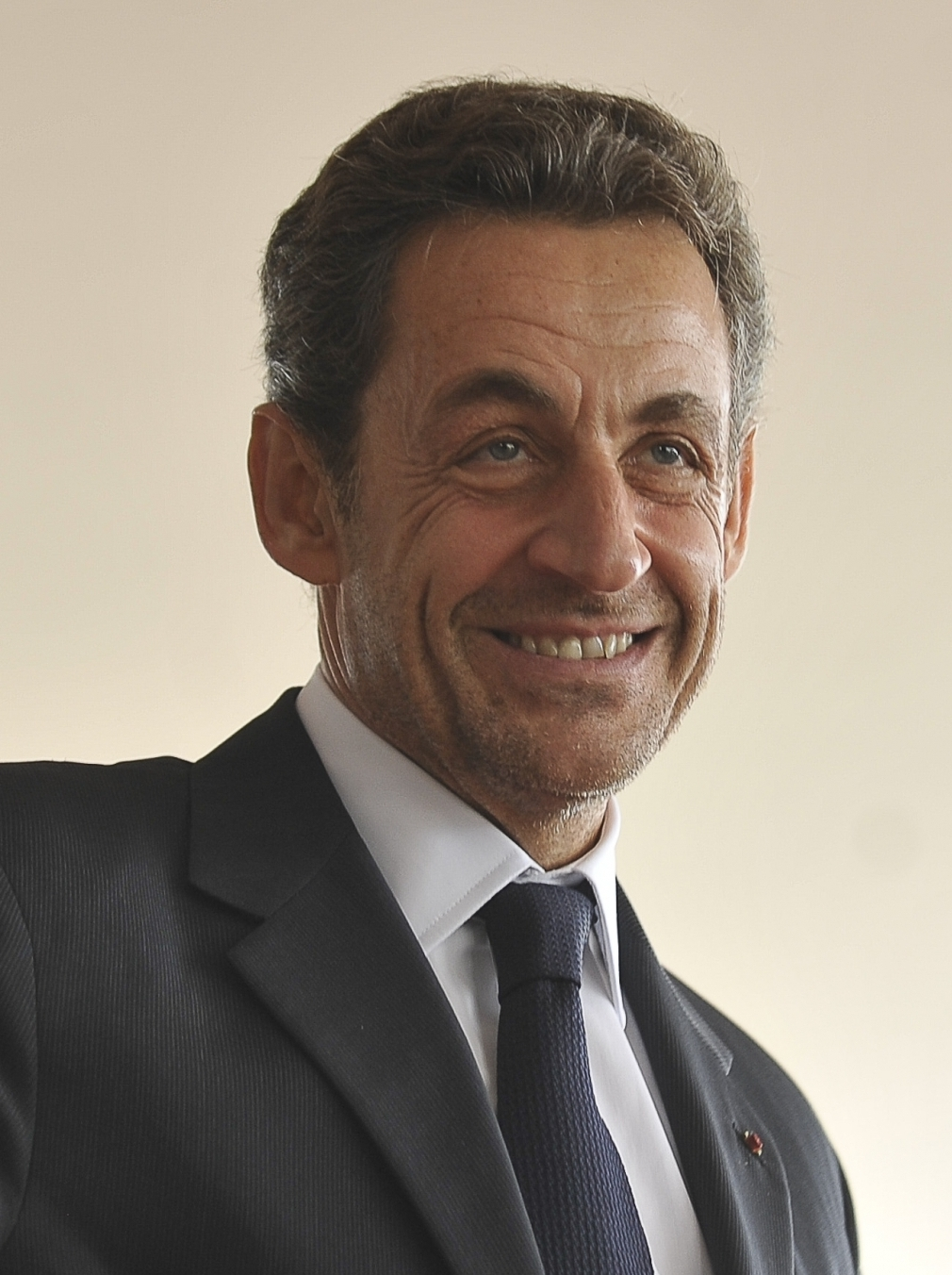
Nominee	François Hollande	Nicolas Sarkozy
Party	PS	UMP
Popular vote	18,000,668	16,860,685
Percentage	51.64%	48.36%
President before election
Nicolas Sarkozy
UMP
Elected President
François Hollande
PS

Presidential elections were held in France on 22 April 2012 (or 21 April in some overseas departments and territories), with a second round run-off held on 6 May (or 5 May for those same territories) to elect the President of France (who is also ex officio one of the two joint heads of state of Andorra, a sovereign state). The incumbent Nicolas Sarkozy was running for a second five-year term for which he was eligible for under the Constitution of France.

The first round ended with the selection of François Hollande and Nicolas Sarkozy as second round participants, as neither of them received a majority of votes cast in the first round. Hollande won the runoff with 51.64% of the vote to Sarkozy's 48.36%. Hollande was the former partner of Ségolène Royal, whom Sarkozy defeated five years earlier in 2007. It was the second time in French history and the first time since the 1981 election that a President seeking reelection was denied a second term, and the only time the incumbent seeking reelection did not obtain the most votes in the first round.

The presidential elections were followed by legislative elections in June. This is the last French presidential election in which the winning candidate won by a single-digit margin.

== Electoral system ==
In overseas departments and territories of France located west of metropolitan France (Saint Pierre and Miquelon, Saint Martin, Saint Barthélemy, Guadeloupe, Martinique, French Guiana, and French Polynesia), voting takes place a day early, so that citizens in those territories and departments do not find themselves voting after the initial announcement of results. This is also the case for French residents in foreign countries west of metropolitan France. Some of these communities are remote; Amerindians in French Guiana, who are French citizens, "sometimes live more than three hours away by canoe from their ballot box", particularly in the large remote commune of Maripasoula. The electoral campaign papers sent to these voters, however, reportedly indicated 22 April as the day of the election, instead of 21 April.

== Candidates ==
In order to qualify for the first round of voting, a candidate had to collect the signatures of at least five hundred elected representatives among a total of more than 47,000; these could be mayors, general councillors, regional councillors, deputies, senators, members of the European Parliament elected in France. The number of signatures per candidate is not released, but five hundred signatories for each candidate are chosen randomly and their names are published. Ten candidates qualified in 2012:

=== Primaries ===
==== Socialist Party ====
The 2011 French Socialist Party presidential primary was the first open primary (primaires citoyennes), jointly held by the French Socialist Party and Radical Party of the Left for selecting their candidate for the 2012 presidential election. Voters had to donate at least one Euro and sign a pledge to the values of the Left to be eligible. The filing deadline for primary nomination papers was fixed on 13 July 2011 and six candidates competed in the first round of the vote. On election day, 9 October 2011, no candidate won at least 50% of the vote therefore the two candidates with the most votes contested a runoff election on 16 October 2011: François Hollande won the primary, defeating Martine Aubry. The idea for holding an open primary to choose the Socialist Party candidate was originally suggested in 2008 by the left-leaning think tank Terra Nova.

==== Europe Écologie–The Greens ====
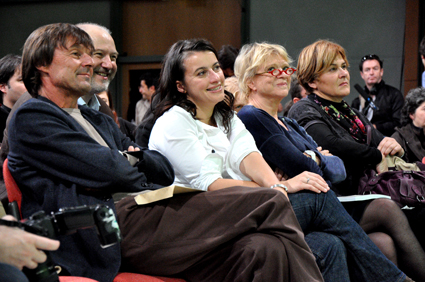
The candidates of the Ecology primary sitting together

Europe Écologie–The Greens (EELV) held a primary to choose its candidate. The vote was open to all members of the party and of the Independent Ecological Movement. There were four candidates. The first round was held on 29 June 2011. Eva Joly, a member of EELV and a former examining magistrate, obtained 49.75% of the vote, ahead of independent candidate and environmental campaigner Nicolas Hulot (40.22%). The other two candidates, Henri Stoll and Stéphane Lhomme, obtained 5.02% and 4.44% respectively. The second round was held on 12 July, with Eva Joly obtaining 13,223 votes (58.16%) to Hulot's 9,399.

=== Confirmed candidates ===
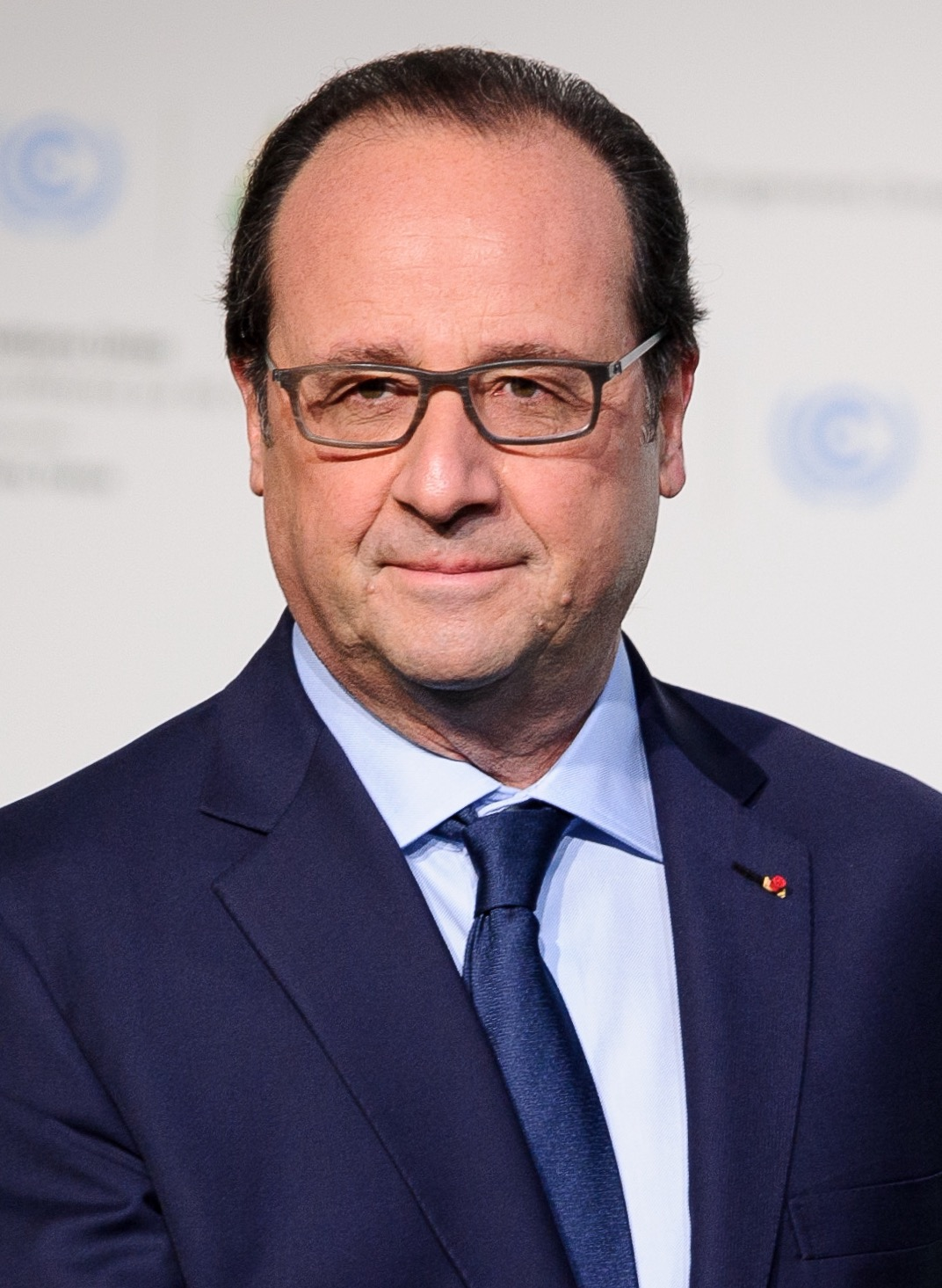
Socialist Party: President of the General Council of Corrèze, former First Secretary of the Socialist Party and MP François Hollande

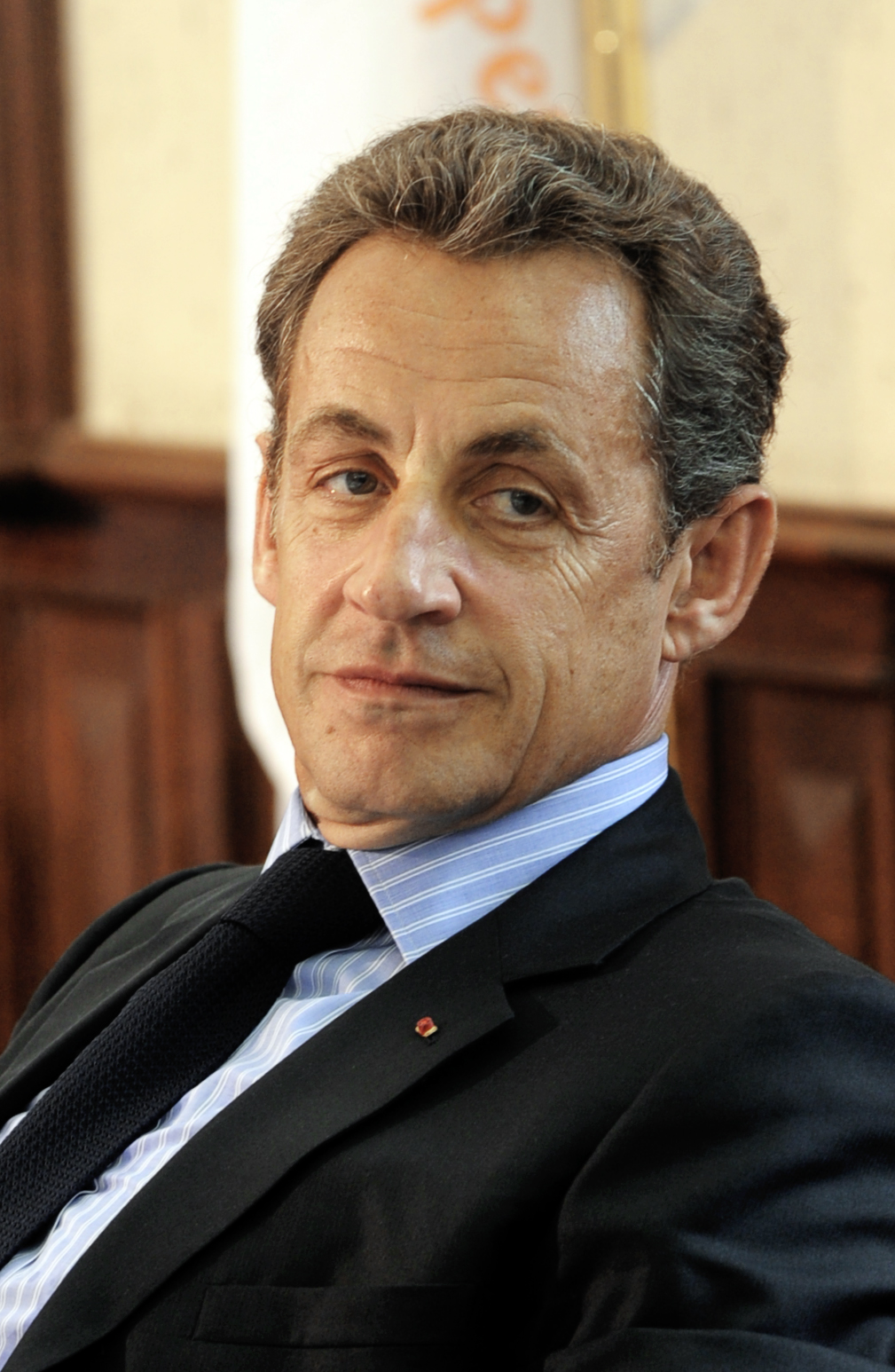
Union for a Popular Movement: On 15 February 2012, President Nicolas Sarkozy announced he was running for a second five-year term.

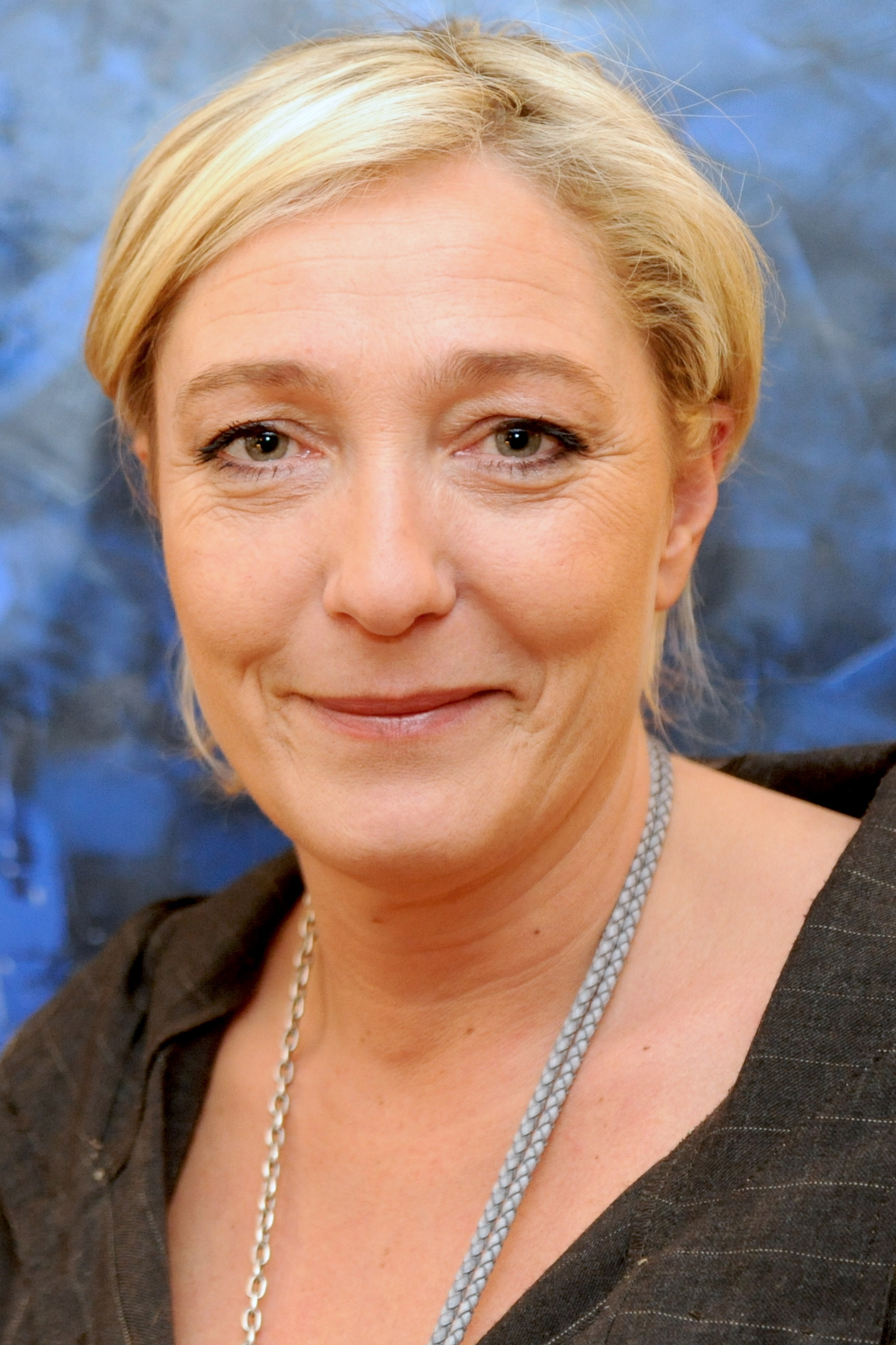
National Front: Party president and MEP Marine Le Pen was selected on 16 May 2011.

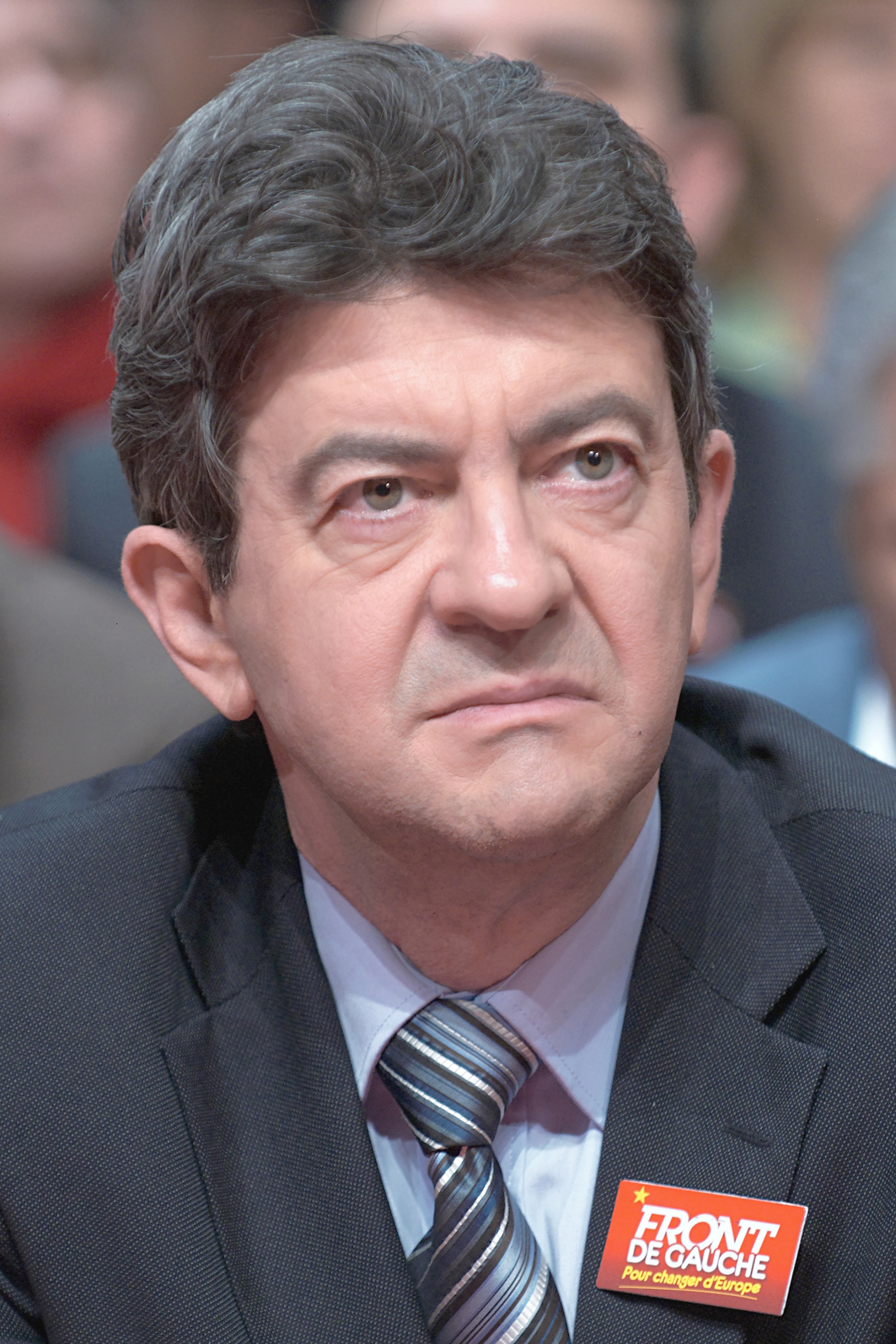
Left Front: MEP, former senator and co-president of the Left Party Jean-Luc Mélenchon

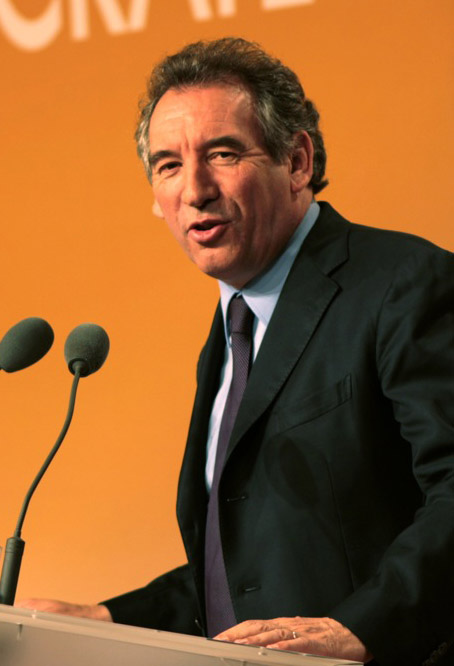
Democratic Movement: François Bayrou, president of MoDem and MP, confirmed his candidacy on 22 August 2011.

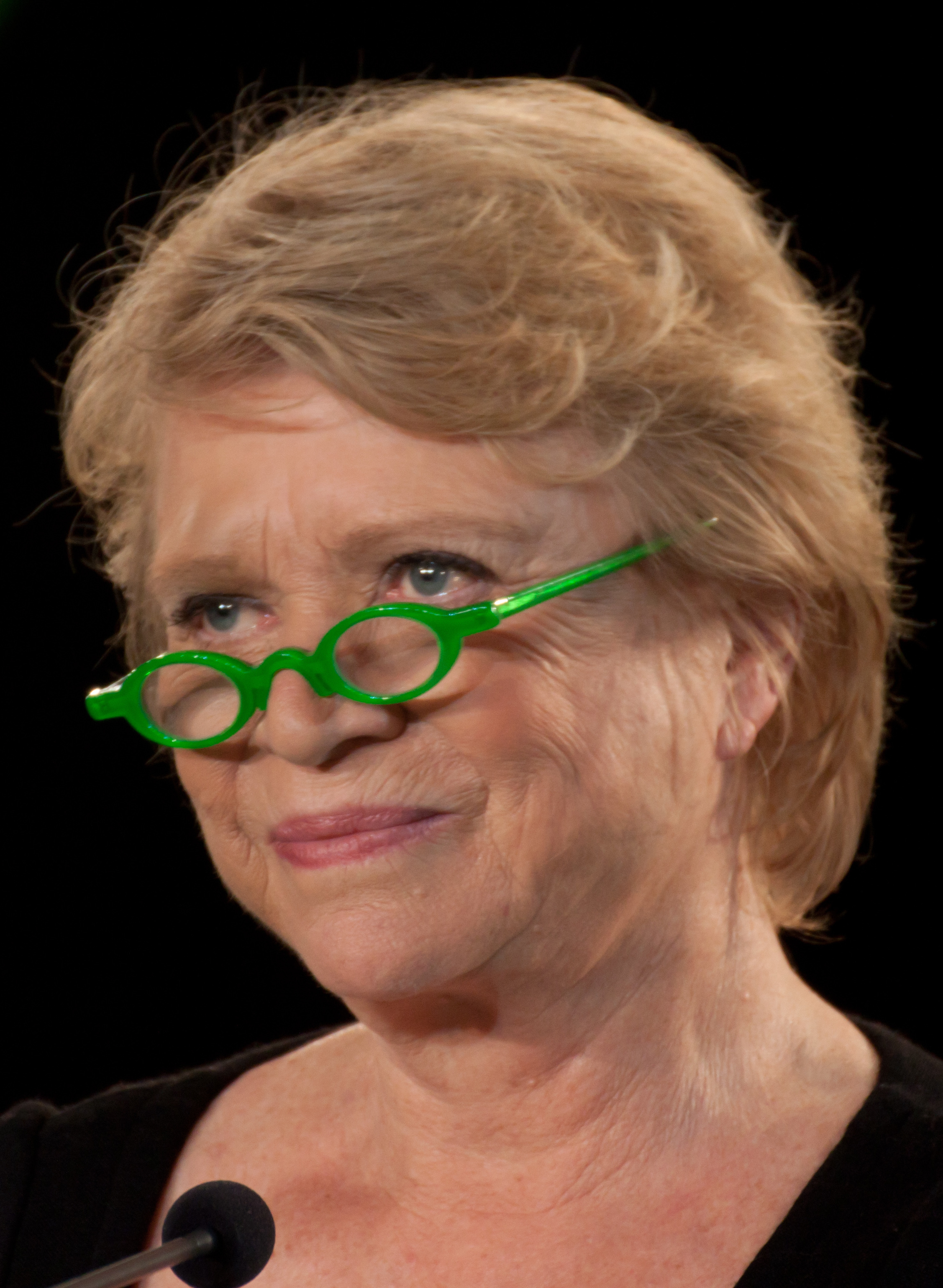
Europe Écologie–The Greens: MEP and former magistrate Eva Joly

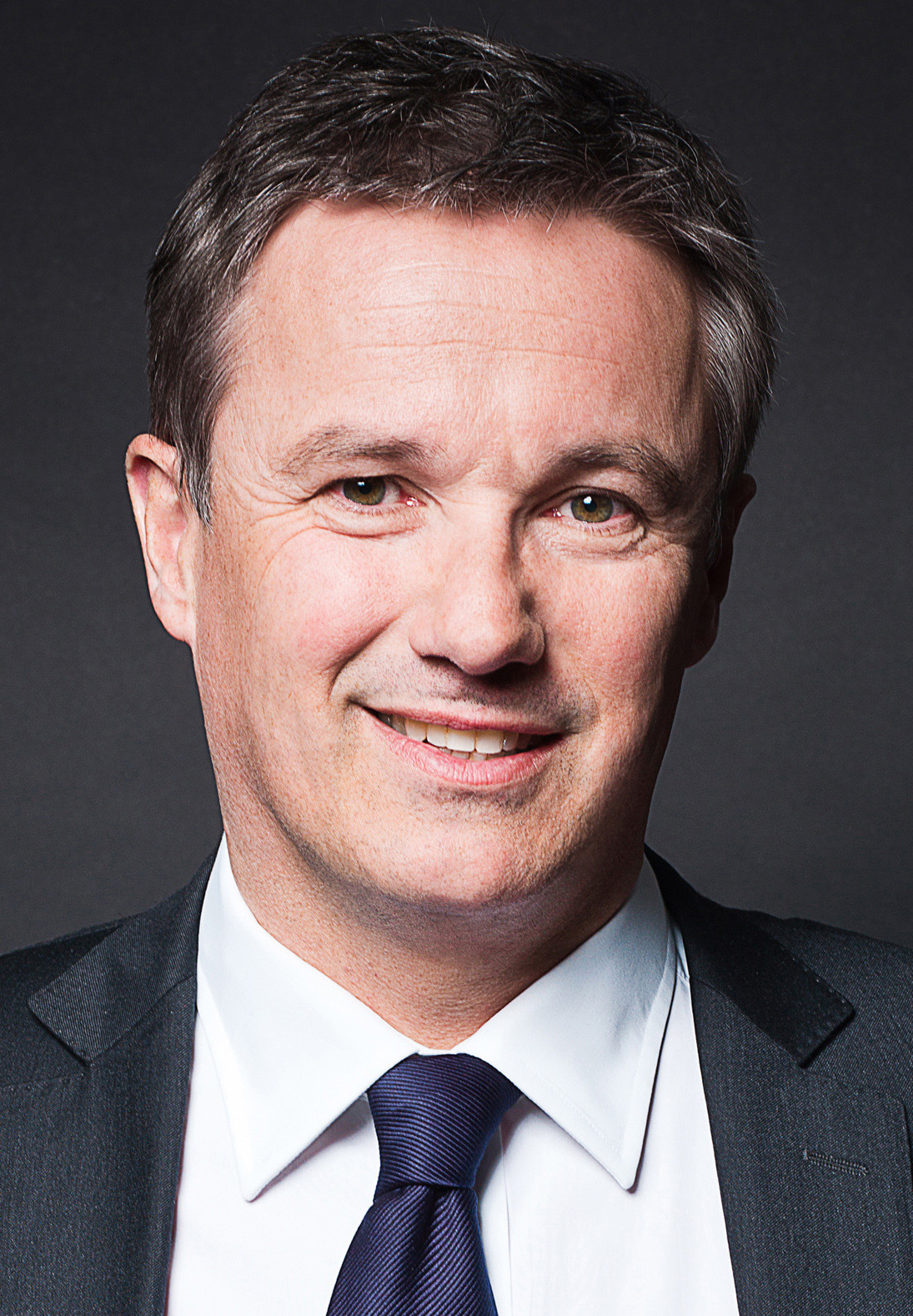
Arise the Republic: Mayor of Yerres and MP Nicolas Dupont-Aignan

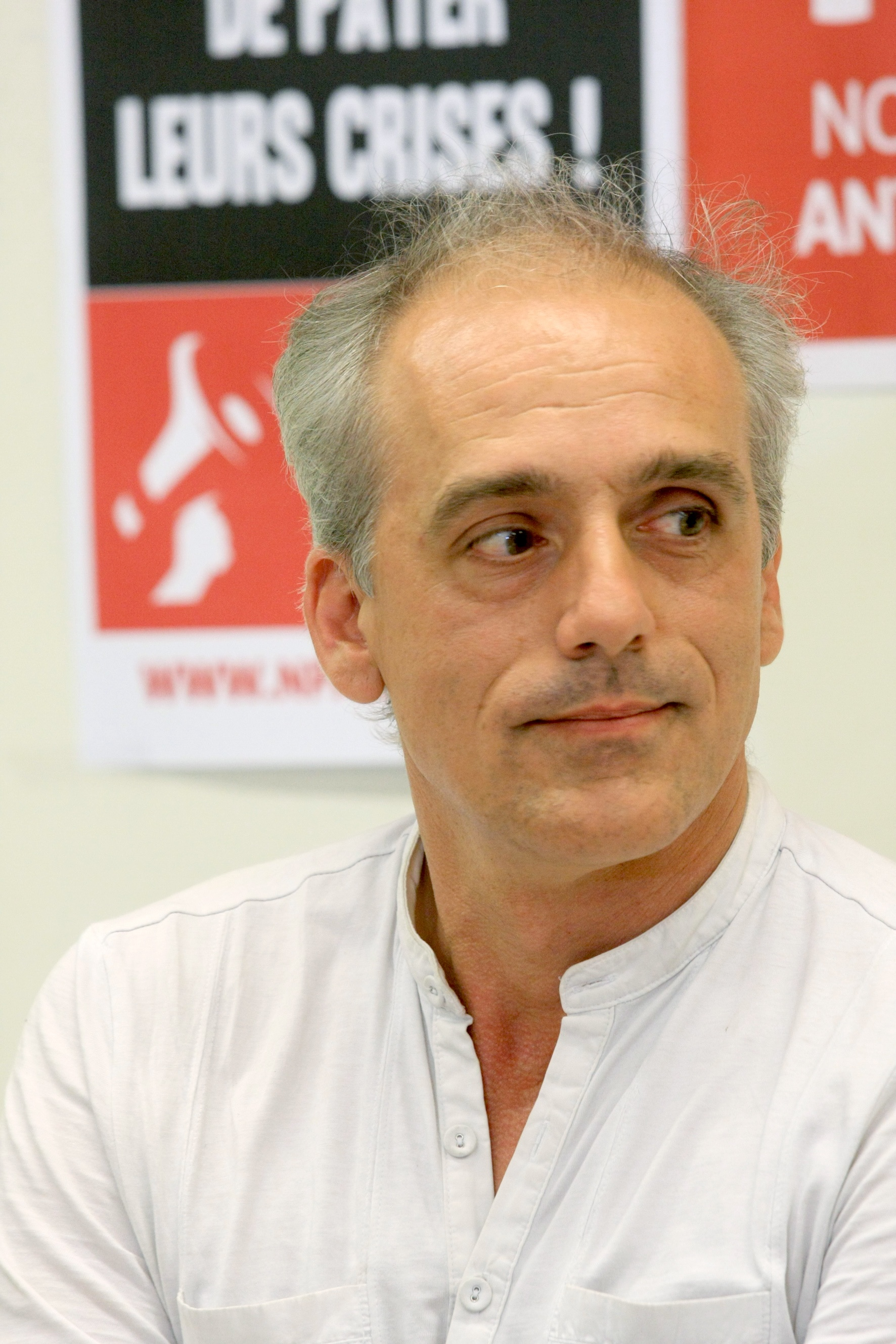
New Anticapitalist Party: Philippe Poutou

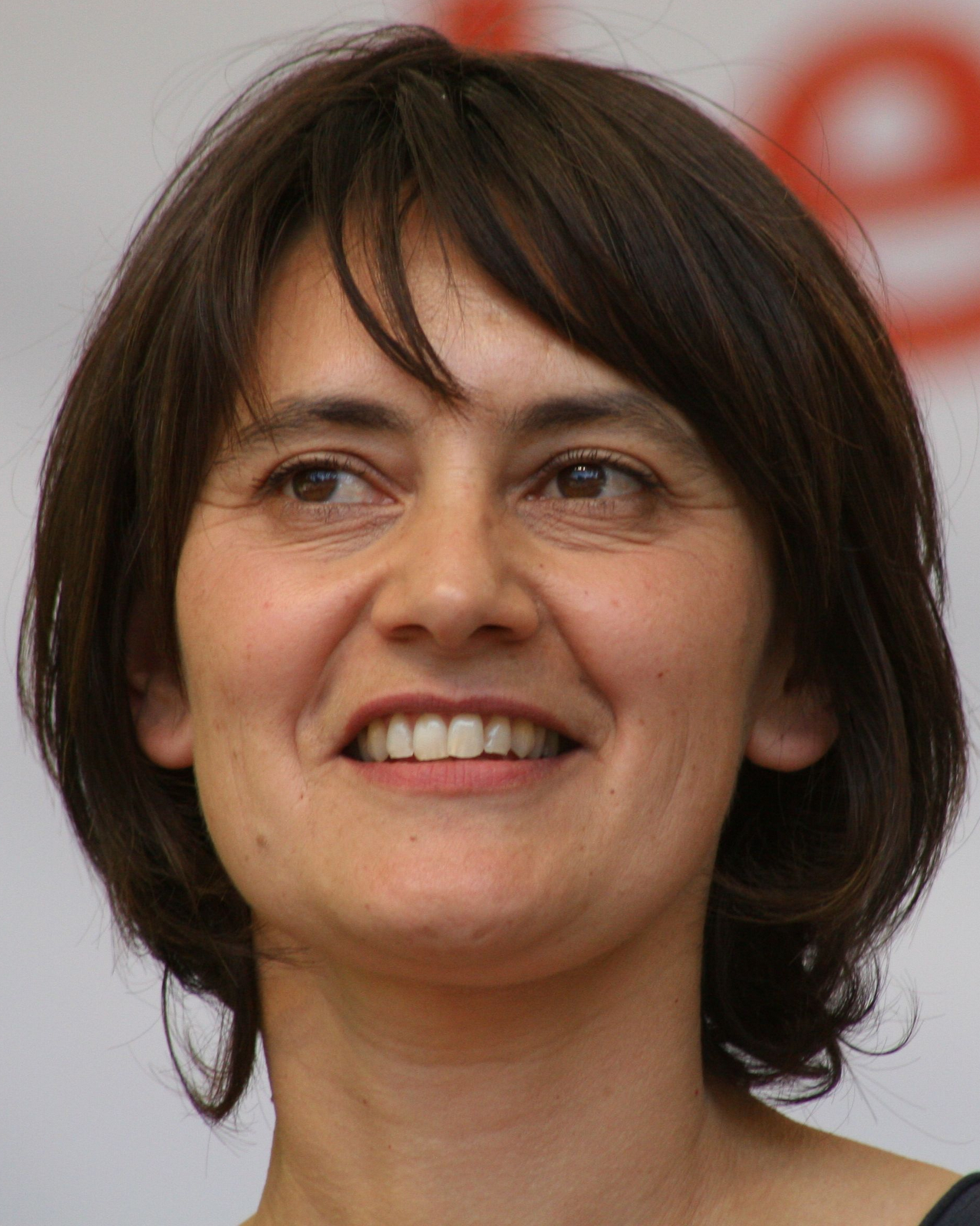
Workers' Struggle: Nathalie Arthaud

== Campaign ==
The official campaign began on 20 March, but in the wake of the shooting at the Ozar Hatorah day school in Toulouse the two leading candidates, Hollande and Sarkozy, suspended their campaigns. Although Jean-Luc Mélenchon argued that to continue with the campaign was "an act of moral, emotional and intellectual resistance." In some parts of the media, Sarkozy and Le Pen were also criticised for misusing the Midi-Pyrénées shootings as campaign fodder against "radical Islam."

The following is a brief overview of the campaign adapted from information in Le Monde.

=== François Hollande ===
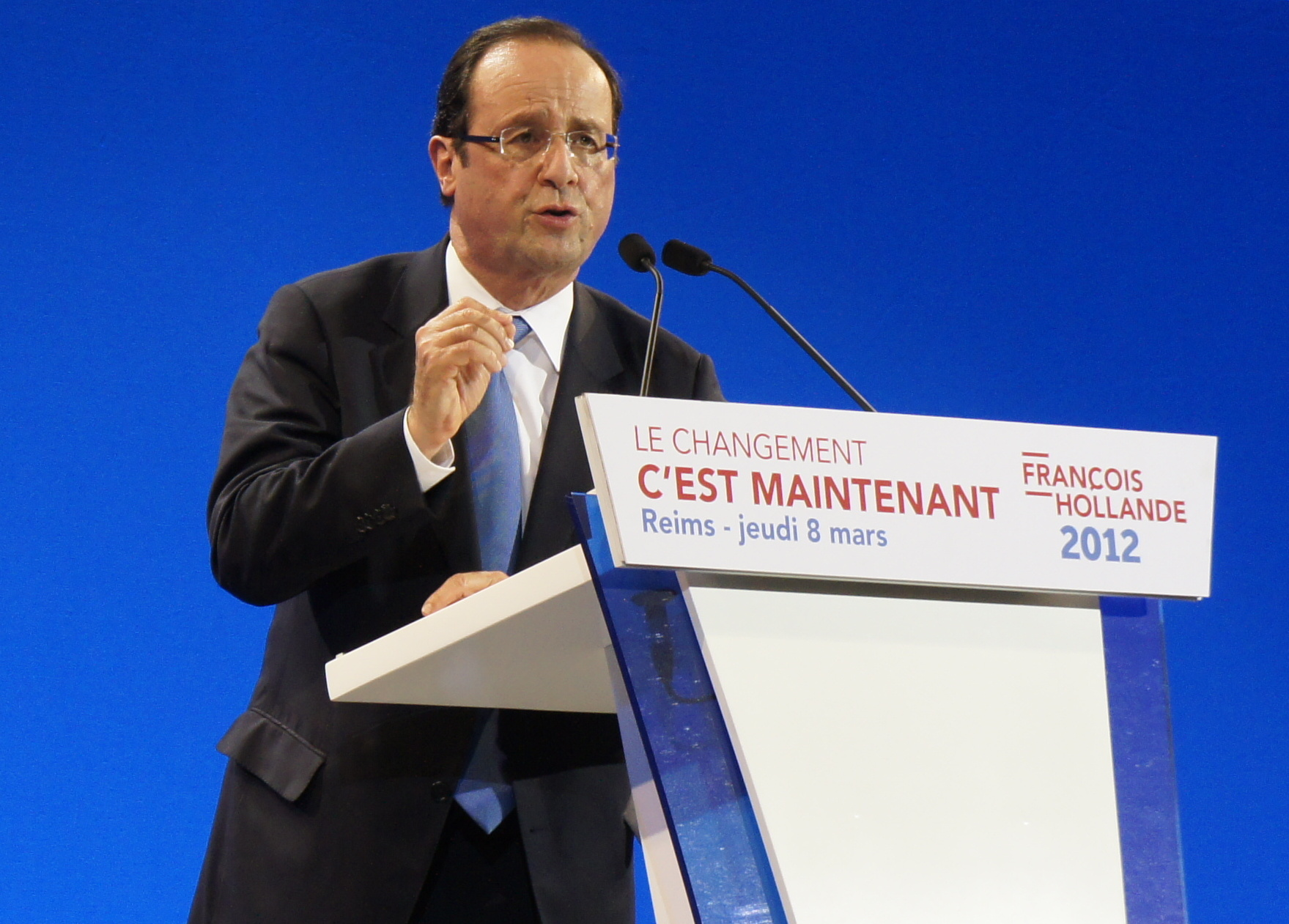
Hollande campaigning

François Hollande, the candidate of the Socialist Party and the Radical Party of the Left, topped the opinion polls throughout the campaign. He emphasised his promise to be a "normal" president, in contrast to Nicolas Sarkozy's sometimes controversial presidential style. He aimed to resorb France's national debt by 2017, notably by cancelling tax cuts for the wealthy and tax exemptions introduced by President Sarkozy. Income tax would be raised to 75% for incomes beyond one million euros; the retirement age would be brought back to 60 (with a full pension) for persons who have worked 42 years; 60 000 jobs cut by Nicolas Sarkozy in public education would be recreated. Homosexual couples would have the right to marry and adopt. Residents without European Union passports would be given the right to vote in local elections after five years of legal residency. On housing, he has promised to regulate rises in rent; to use punitive measures to compel towns and cities to apply the 2000 Law on Solidarity and Urban Renewal, which mandates the providing of social housing; and to provide public lands for the building of social housing. Hollande won the election, finishing first on the first balloting of ten candidates in April with 28.63% of the vote, and again finishing first on the runoff ballot between himself and Sarkozy with 51.64% against Sarkozy's 48.36%.

=== Nicolas Sarkozy ===
Nicolas Sarkozy, the incumbent president and candidate of the Union for a Popular Movement, was aiming for a second and last term in office. He was consistently second in opinion polls throughout the campaign, behind François Hollande. His reforms during his first term included a reform of universities, and of the retirement age; a reform enabling citizens to query the constitutionality of laws; and a reduction in the number of public sector employees. He argued that his reforms had helped steer France through a period of economic crisis.

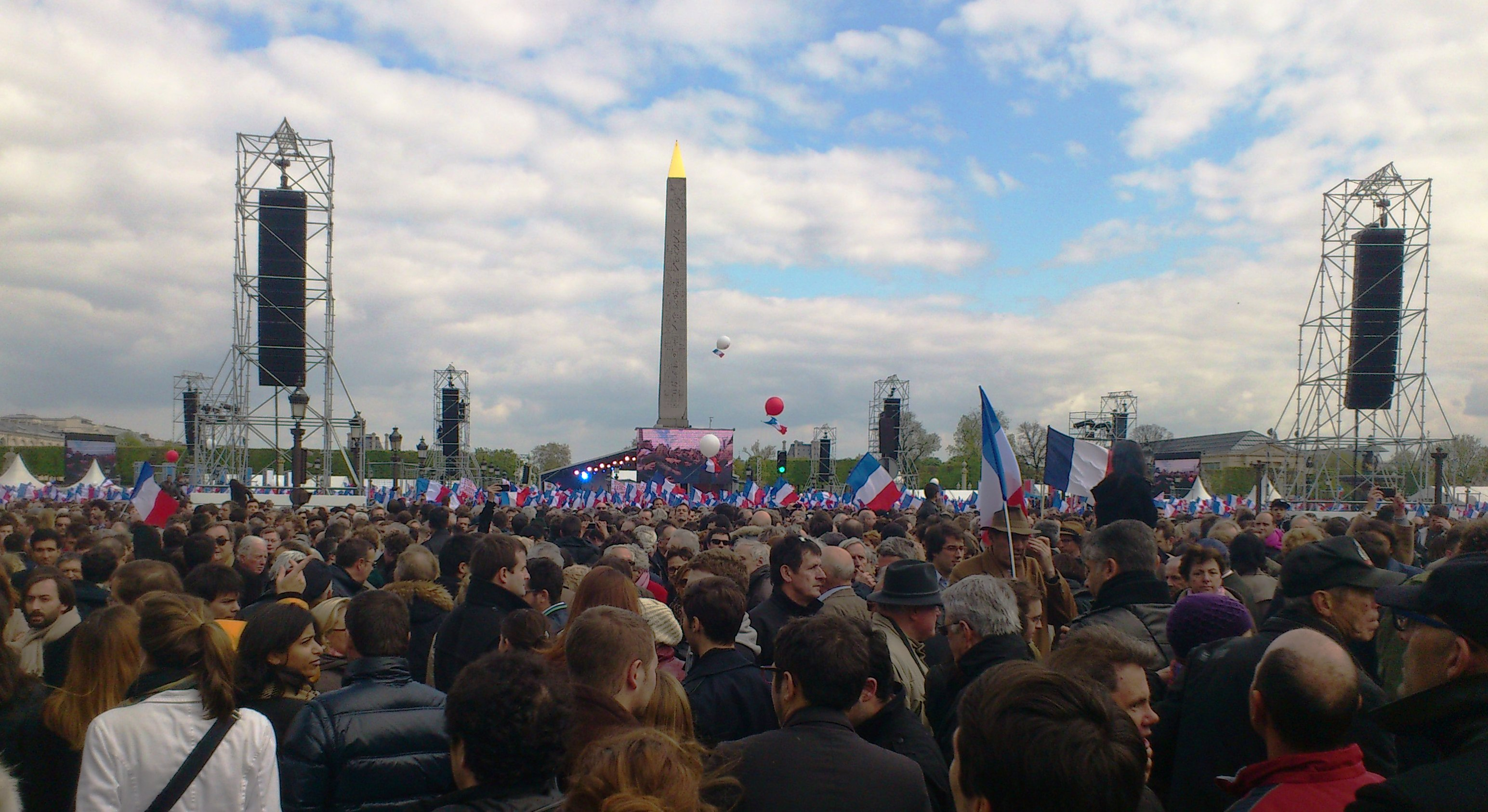
Sarkozy rally at Place de la Concorde

Sarkozy's campaign pledges for his potential second term are described by Le Monde as "anchored on the right". He has promised to reduce legal immigration by 50%; threatened to withdraw France from the Schengen Area unless it were revised to enable stricter border controls; promised to compel beneficiaries of the Revenu de solidarité active to accept certain jobs, in exchange for support in finding them; and opposed Hollande's proposals in favour of gay marriage and voting rights for foreign residents in local elections. He has also promised more frequent referendums, for citizens to be consulted on major issues.

Sarkozy admitted during the campaign that he did not visit Fukushima while in Japan after the previous year's earthquake and tsunami, despite having previously said he had done so.

=== Marine Le Pen ===
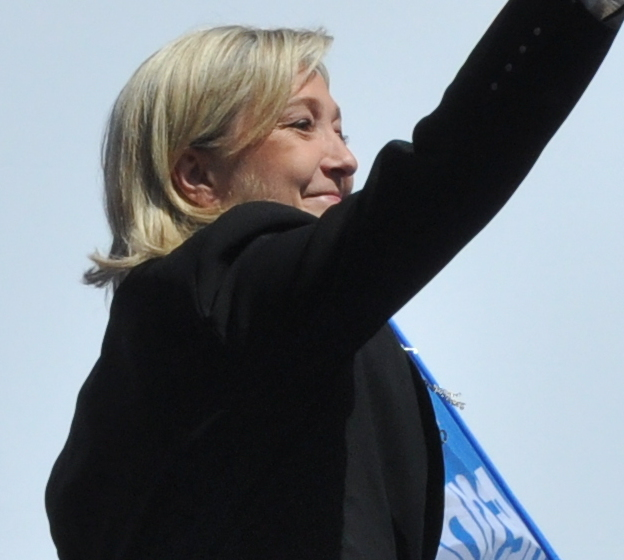
Le Pen campaigning

Marine Le Pen is the candidate of the National Front, succeeding her father Jean-Marie Le Pen, who was a candidate in five presidential elections. Aiming to reach the second round, as her father had done in 2002, she also attempted to provide a different image of the party, avoiding the controversial statements previously made by her father. She has advocated "national preference" for French citizens (over foreign residents) for access to jobs and social services, and a form of protectionism, as well as withdrawing from the euro and the European Union. She has advocated reducing legal immigration by 95%, abolishing the right to family reunification, and reinstating the death penalty, abolished in 1981 by then president François Mitterrand. She held the third place in opinion polls for much of the campaign, occasionally rising into first and second place in 2011 or dipping to fourth behind Jean-Luc Mélenchon, but remained consistently behind Hollande and Sarkozy by 2012. She finished the 2012 balloting with 17.90% of the vote tally, placing her third in the final results.

=== Jean-Luc Mélenchon ===
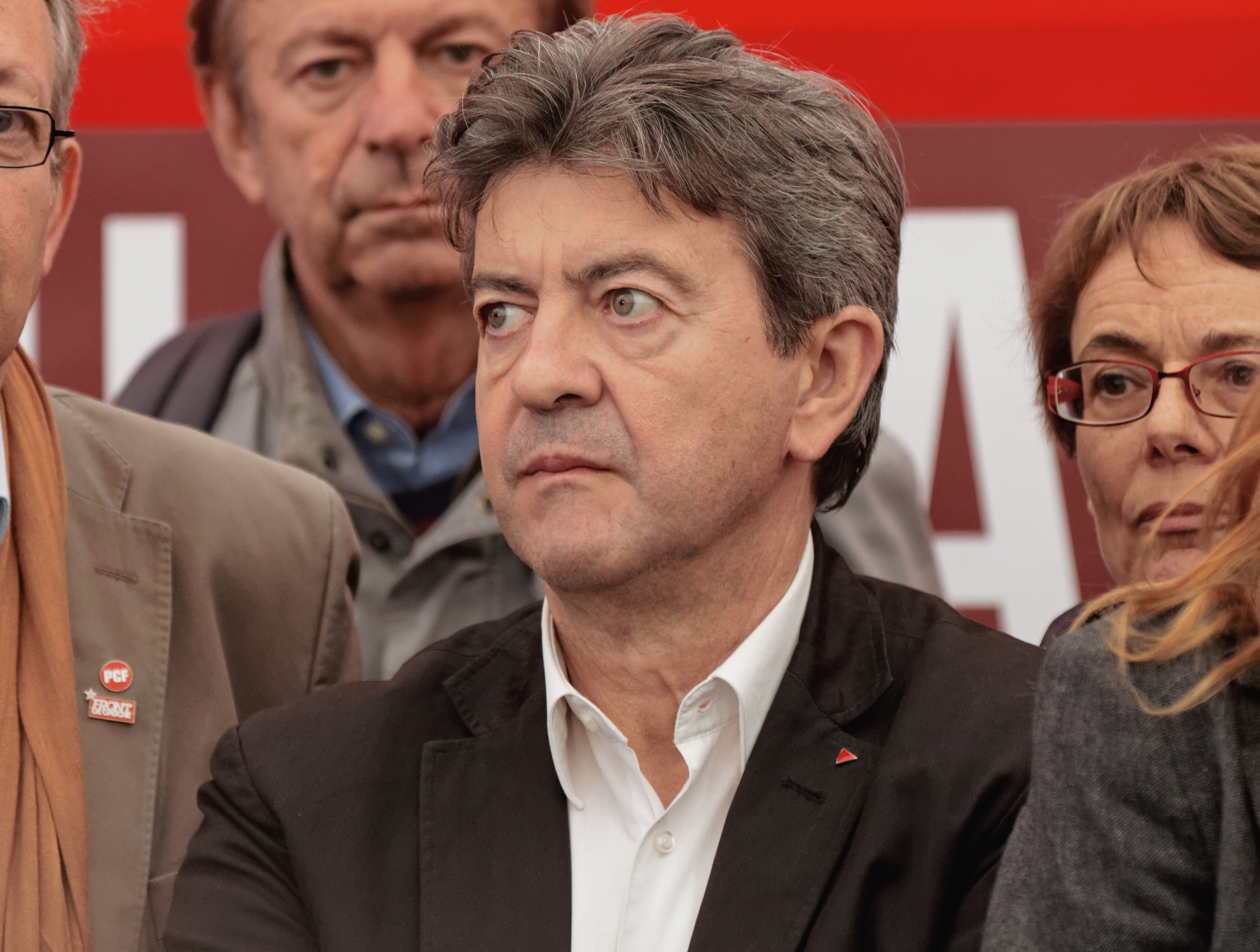
Mélenchon campaigning

Jean-Luc Mélenchon is the candidate of the Left Front, which includes in particular the French Communist Party and the Left Party. (He is a member of the latter.) He has been described as the surprise or revelation of the campaign, with his level of support in opinion polls rising from 5% in October 2011 to around 15% (and sometimes up to 17%) by the end of the campaign. He finished in the first round of balloting with 11.10% of the national electorate, placing him fourth in the field of 10 candidates. He inaugurated the practice of giant open-air meetings, which the two leading candidates then adopted in turn. A former French teacher, he was noted for his eloquent style and oratory, but also for his argumentative relationship with journalists, and occasional insults; he notably described Marine Le Pen as "half-demented". He proposed raising the minimum wage to €1,700; setting a maximum wage differential of 1 to 20 in all businesses, so that employers wishing to increase their own salaries would also have to increase those of their employees; setting social and environmental norms which businesses would have to respect in order to receive public subsidies; supporting social enterprises through government procurement; taxing imports which do not meet certain social and environmental norms; and reestablishing 60 as the legal retirement age with a full pension. There would be an "ecological planification" towards a green, sustainable economy, backed by a "green rule" (règle verte) to be inscribed in the Constitution. On tax, he has proposed a progressive taxation, with higher taxes on the wealthy and a 100% tax rate beyond an income of €360,000 (thereby creating a maximum wage); expatriate French nationals established in a country with a lower tax rate than in France would pay the difference in tax in France. Businesses creating jobs, paying higher wages and/or providing training would receive tax cuts. Healthcare costs would be fully reimbursed by the state, and the right to die would be recognised. The right to abortion would be secured through inclusion in the Constitution. Homosexual couples would have the right to marry and adopt. Naturalisation of foreign residents would be facilitated, and foreign residents would have the right to vote in local elections. A constitutional convention would be assembled, with an aim in particular to increase the prerogatives of Parliament and diminish the powers of the President; all elections would be based on proportional representation, with gender parity.

=== François Bayrou ===
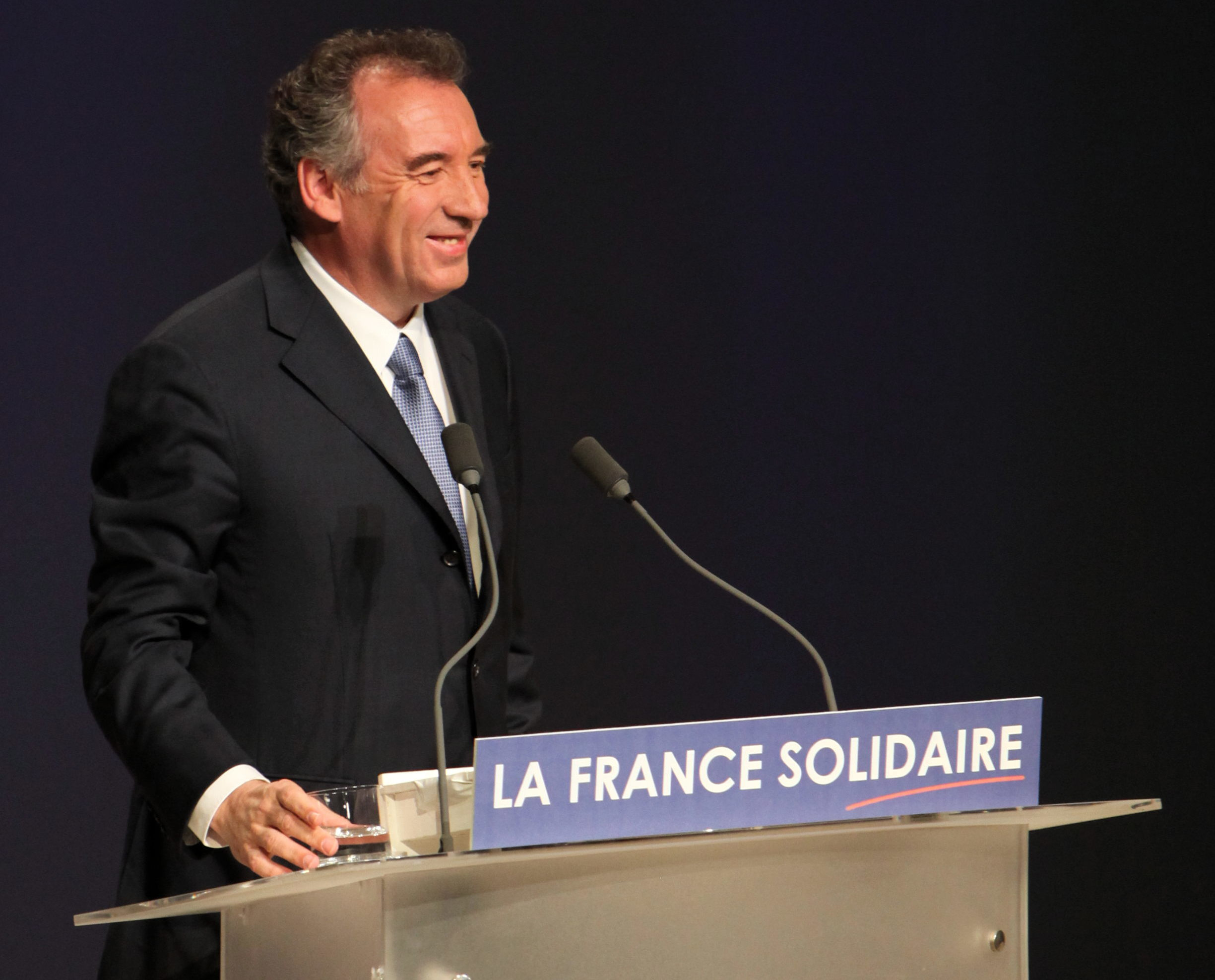
Bayrou campaigning

François Bayrou was the candidate of the Democratic Movement, which he founded in 2007. He is one of only two candidates to stand in both the 2007 and 2012 elections (the other being Nicolas Sarkozy); he obtained 18.57% of the vote in 2007, finishing third. In the 2012 election he received 9.13% of the vote in the first round of balloting, finishing fifth. He stands for an independent centre in politics, which he has sought to distinguish clearly both from the left and the right. Describing France as being "in a critical state", he has focused on reducing the country's national debt, through a public spending freeze, cuts to tax exemptions, and a raise in taxes (Value added tax and taxes on the wealthy). On education, he has proposed that half the time in primary school should be dedicated to the mastering of reading and writing.

=== Eva Joly ===
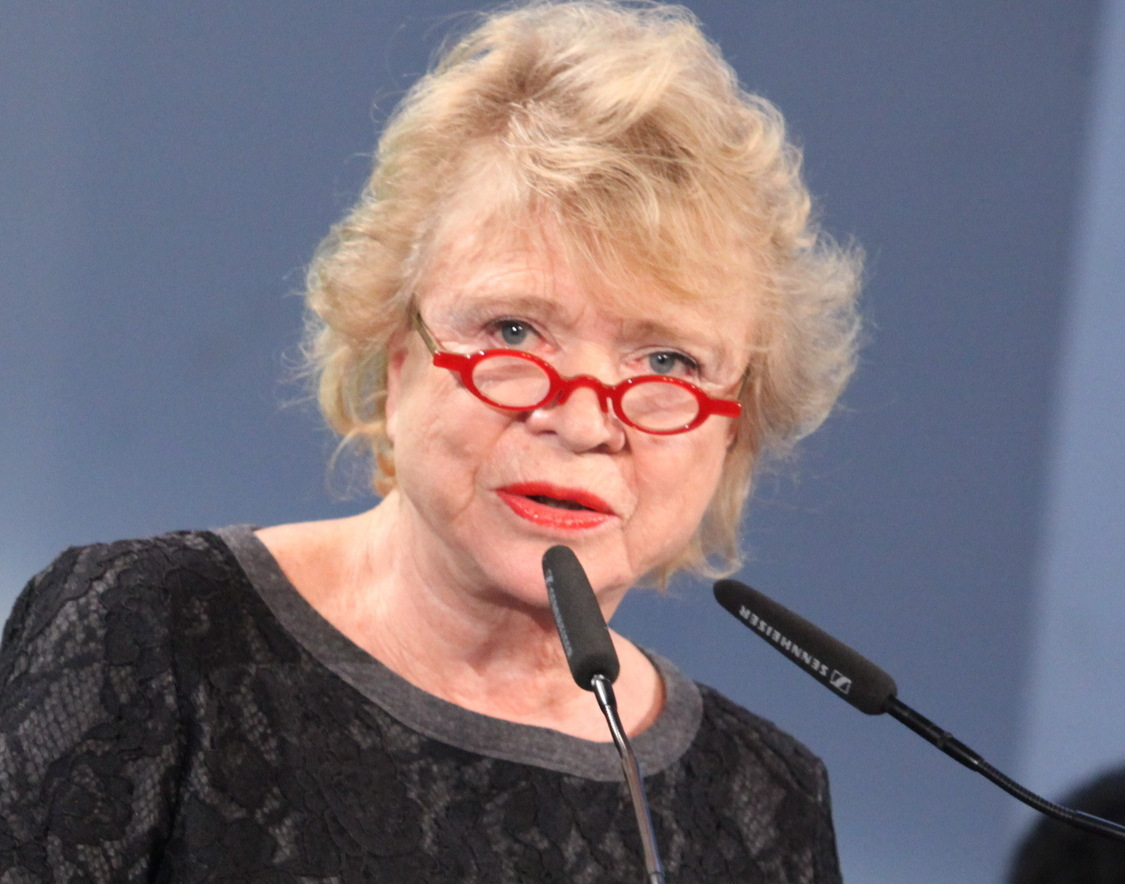
Joly campaigning

Eva Joly was the candidate of Europe Écologie–The Greens. Before entering politics for this election, she was a known public figure, as the examining magistrate in criminal corruption cases involving powerful companies or individuals – notably the Elf Aquitaine oil company, the Crédit Lyonnais bank or businessman and politician Bernard Tapie. (See: Elf affair (fr).) She is also the first foreign-born person to stand for the French presidency; born in Norway, she is a naturalized French citizen. She focused her campaign not only on the environment but also on social issues, describing herself as the representative of the "reasonable" or "realistic" left, and on denouncing discrimination against ethnic and religious minorities. Homosexual couples would be given the right to marry and adopt, and foreign residents would have the right to vote in all elections. She suggested that the "ecological transformation of the economy" would create 600 000 jobs over the next five years. An agreement signed between her party and the Socialist Party contained a clause on the closing of nuclear reactors; in the final stages of the campaign, when François Hollande announced it would not be upheld, she expressed the hope she could still convince him. She also drew attention by accusing Nicolas Sarkozy of having obtained illicit funding for his previous campaign; critics accused her of ignoring the presumption of innocence, and Sarkozy himself replied that he "despised" her accusations. Known for her bright red glasses, which she symbolically switched for bright green ones, she was described by the press as struggling with her campaign, barely reaching 3% in opinion polls.

=== Nicolas Dupont-Aignan ===
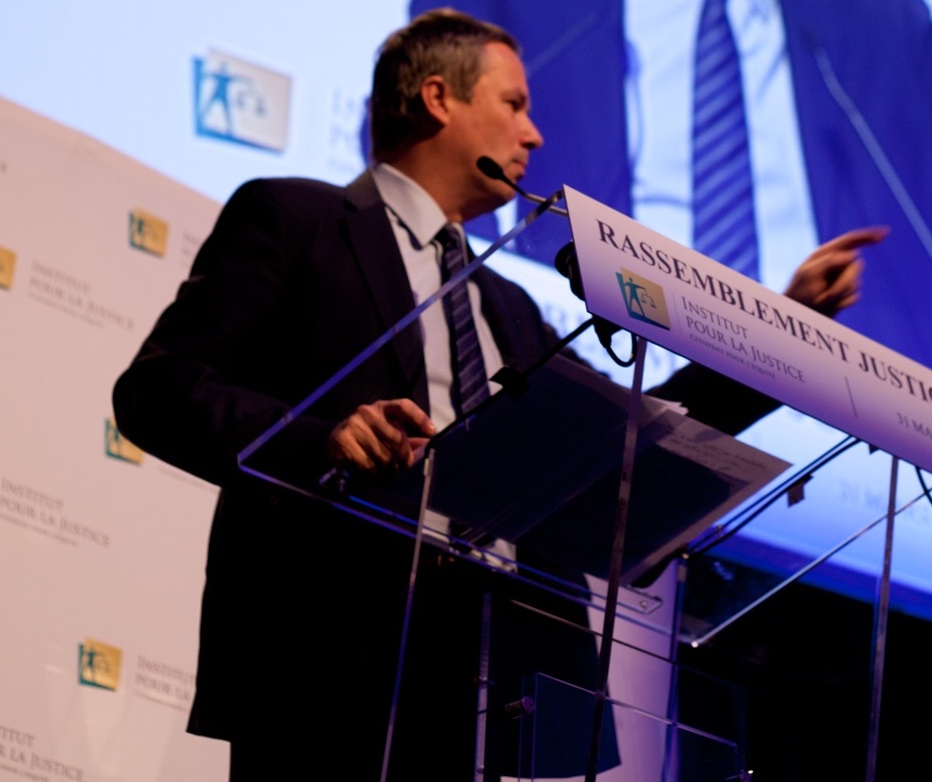
Dupont-Aignan campaigning

Nicolas Dupont-Aignan, described as an "anti-euro souverainist", is the candidate of Arise the Republic, a party he founded in 2008. He has advocated leaving the euro on grounds of economic well-being, and the European Union "in its current form", which he describes as "already dead" and leading to "economic ruin and social regression". He has called for an "intelligent protectionism", with tariffs on imports that result from "human slavery"; and tax cuts for businesses that reinvest their profits in France. He has described himself as a Gaullist.

=== Philippe Poutou ===
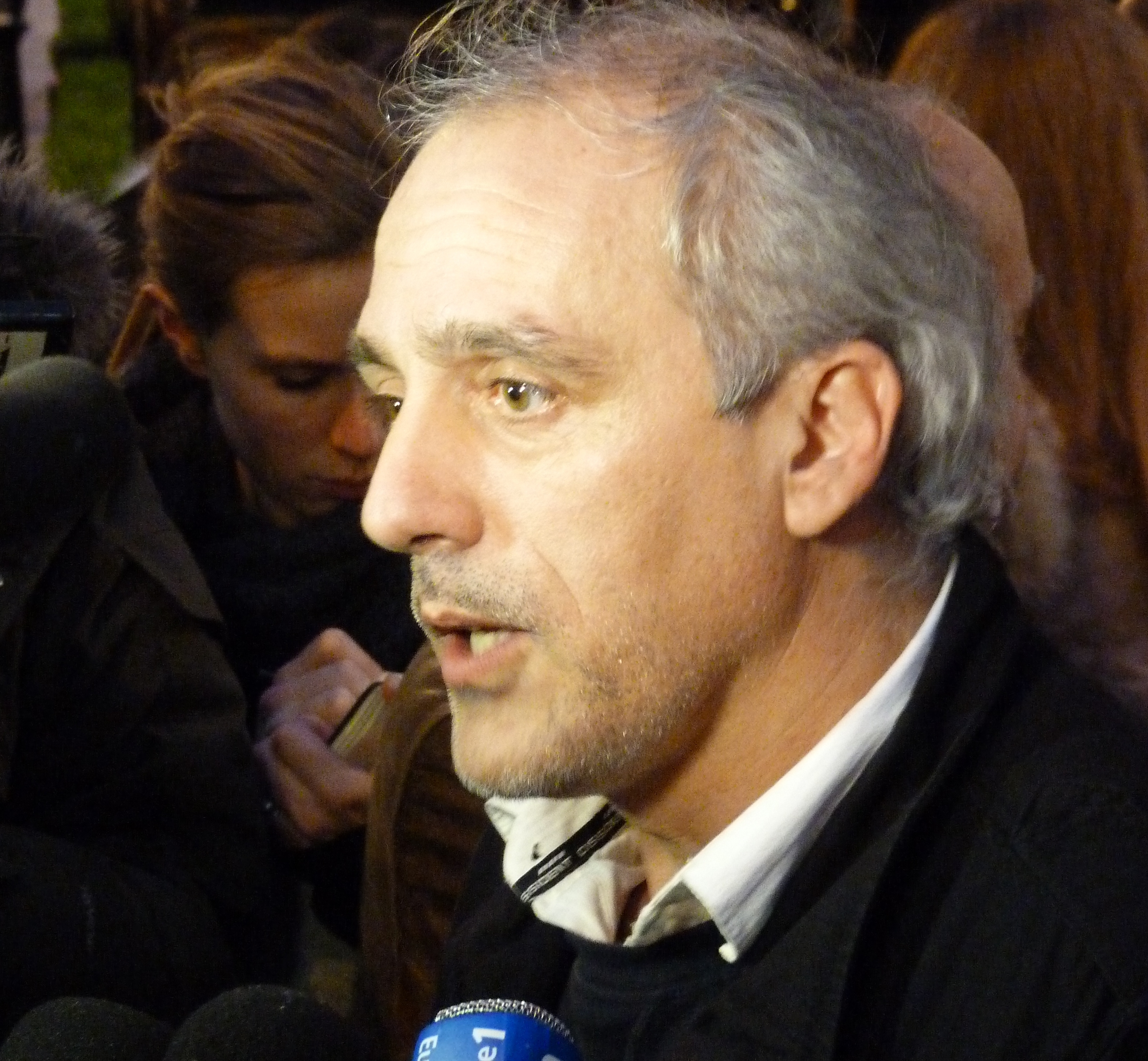
Poutou campaigning

Philippe Poutou, a worker at a Ford factory in Blanquefort, is the candidate of the New Anticapitalist Party, succeeding Olivier Besancenot. For much of the campaign, he remained little known to the general public; he was described as lacking Besancenot's popularity, charisma and ease with words. Freely admitting that he did not particularly want to be a candidate, and that he did not aim to be elected (particularly as one of his policies was to abolish the function of president, in favour of a fully parliamentary system), he saw his profile and popularity increase somewhat in the late stages of the campaign, when all candidates obtained equal airtime in the media. In particular, his unconventional behaviour drew attention during the television programme Des paroles et des actes (fr), along with his unusual campaign clips – such as one based on the film The Artist. Like Nathalie Arthaud, his message was that improvements in workers' rights would come through workers' struggles and demands rather than through the ballot box.

=== Nathalie Arthaud ===
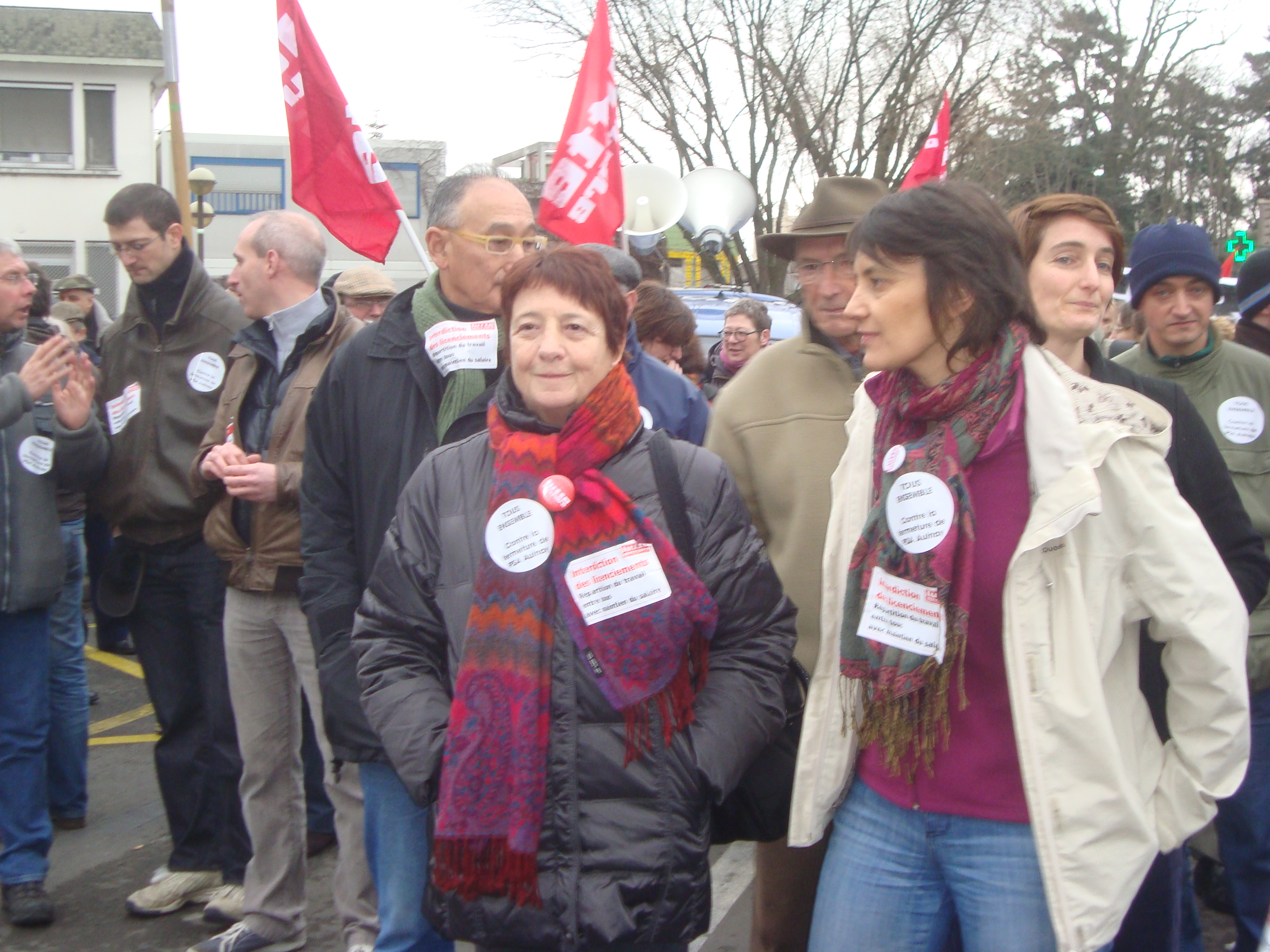
Arthaud campaigning

Nathalie Arthaud, a teacher of economics and management in a secondary school, is the candidate of Workers' Struggle. She succeeds famous perennial candidate Arlette Laguiller, who represented the party in six consecutive presidential elections, from 1974 to 2007. A Trotskyist, she has described herself as the "only communist candidate" in the election. She has stated that she does not aim to be elected, describing elections as "inessential", and considering that workers will obtain new rights only through their struggles rather than through the ballot box.

=== Jacques Cheminade ===
Jacques Cheminade is the candidate of his Solidarity and Progress movement, the French branch of the LaRouche movement. Described as a "conspiracy theorist" by the press, he drew some attention with his proposals for an expanded space programme, and stagnated slightly above 0% in the opinion polls.

=== Second round ===
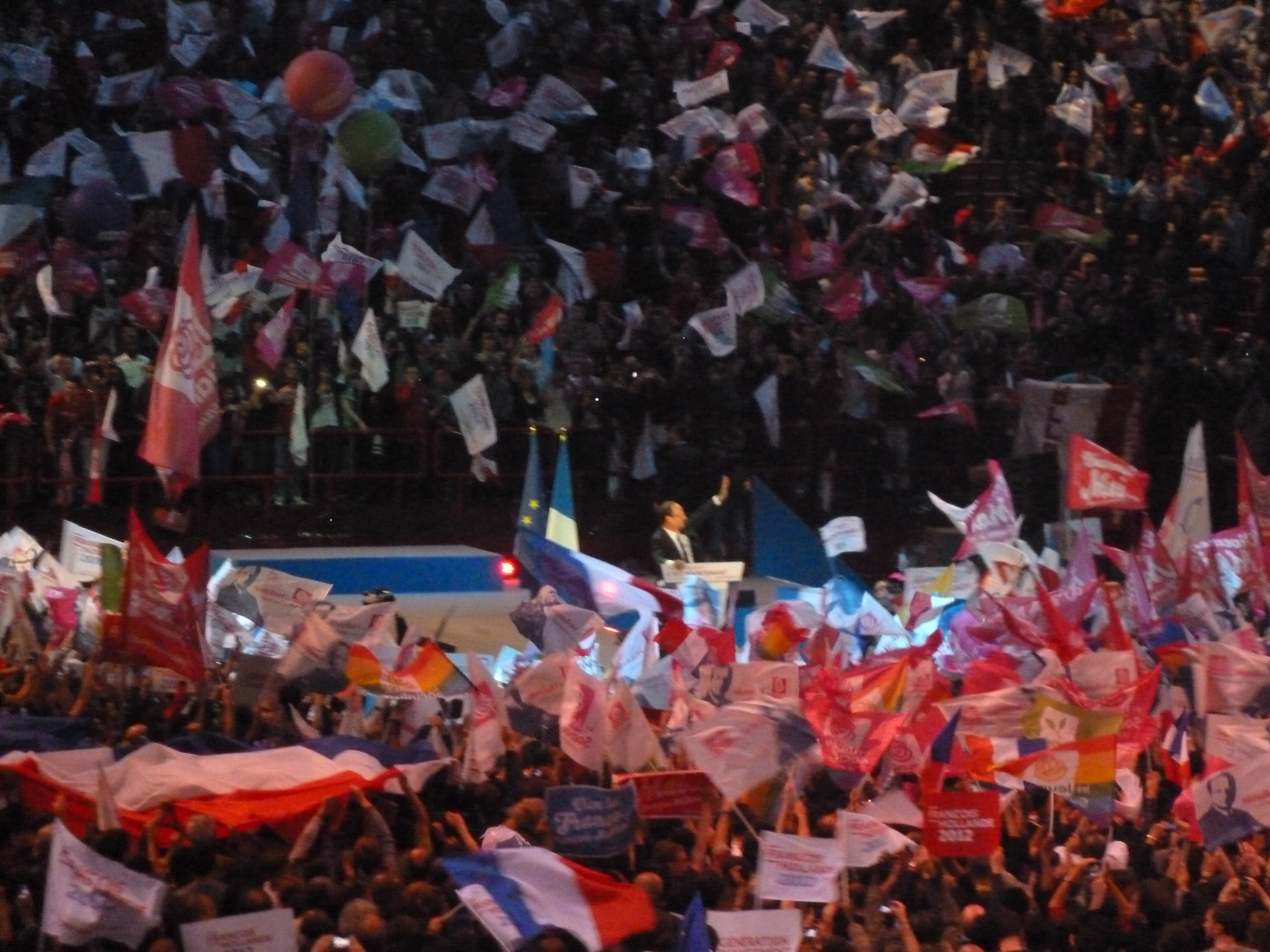
François Hollande at a meeting during 2012 political campaign.

Since the first round there had been a drive to woo far-right voters with Sarkozy making immigration a major issue of his campaign and Hollande focusing on the euro-zone crisis and the state of the economy. Sarkozy's move to the right in embracing National Front themes such as stricter immigration has drawn criticism from prominent figures from his own party such as former Prime Ministers Dominique de Villepin, Jean-Pierre Raffarin, Alain Juppé and Senators Chantal Jouanno and Jean-René Lecerf. There was more criticism of the German-led austerity measures by Hollande, while he also responded to Sarkozy's words at a rally in Toulouse saying that "without borders there is no nation, there is no Republic, there is no civilisation. We are not superior to others but we are different." In turn Hollande told a bigger rally in Paris that "I want victory, but not at any price, not at the price of caricature and lies. I want to win over the men and women who are angry, a hundred times yes, but compromise myself? A thousand times no." Sarkozy reiterated threats to withdraw from the Schengen Agreement if there was no tightening of border controls. He also said that there would be a presumption of self-defense when police are involved in the killing of suspects and criticised the EU's lack of mention of Europe's Christian roots in its constitution. Many of the issues were similar to that of the National Front, from which Sarkozy's UMP gained votes between the 2002 and 2007 election. He further spoke "to those French who stay home, don't complain when Francois Hollande is elected and regularizes all illegal immigrants and lets foreigners vote."

Le Pen stated she would submit a blank ballot in the run-off, calling on her supporters to make their own choices. Bayrou announced on 3 May that he would vote for Hollande. German Chancellor Angela Merkel also said she saw nothing "normal" in Hollande, despite his attempts to portray himself as such; instead she supported Sarkozy's campaign. Campaigning officially ended on 4 May.

In the last government bond sale before the election, the previously rising yields fell slightly, while the amount sold was marginally lower than expected.

International effect

The campaign has led to a "certain degree of gridlock in EU's corridors of power". It's unclear who will be the head of the Euro Group, who will join the Executive Board of the European Central Bank (ECB) and who will lead the European Stability Mechanism (ESM).

=== Endorsements ===
In the days before the election, editorials in the main newspapers expressed opinions about the two candidates. Le Monde did not explicitly support one or the other, but wrote that Hollande "has confirmed, between the two rounds, his consistency, albeit without addressing the vagueness of some of his own proposals", while Sarkozy "has demonstrated his inconsistency, first running after the National Front, crossing the red line which had been set at the turn of the 1980s, and respected since then in the ranks of the republican right, before moving back towards the centre to avoid a breakdown with his own side". Libération supported Hollande:

On the right, Nicolas Sarkozy has kept up a strategy of tension, leading his side into a transgression of its founding values. Whatever the outcome of the vote, the political landscape will remain, as a consequence, marked by a lasting and dangerous change. On the left, François Hollande has demonstrated that another vision of politics, another way of conceiving the State, another European politics are not only possible but within sight. And that, to finish, justice must be the cardinal virtue of societies such as ours, marked by a deep crisis and anger.

Le Figaro published an editorial in support of Sarkozy.

Of the candidates who went out in the first round, Bayrou, Joly and Cheminade all explicitly declared their support for Hollande in the second round, while Mélenchon and Poutou implicitly endorsed a vote for Hollande by urging their supporters to vote against Sarkozy. Dupont-Aignan backed Sarkozy, while Le Pen and Arthaud declined to support either candidate.

=== Debates ===
There was one televised debate between Hollande and Sarkozy, although Sarkozy said he would prefer three, an idea Hollande rejected. This took place on 2 May. Hollande accused Sarkozy of dividing the French and failing to lower unemployment. Hollande promised to be a president for social justice, economic recovery and national unity. Sarkozy was said to have told Hollande that his lack of experience in national government made him unfit for the task of leading the world's fifth-largest economy in a crisis.

== Opinion polls ==
First round

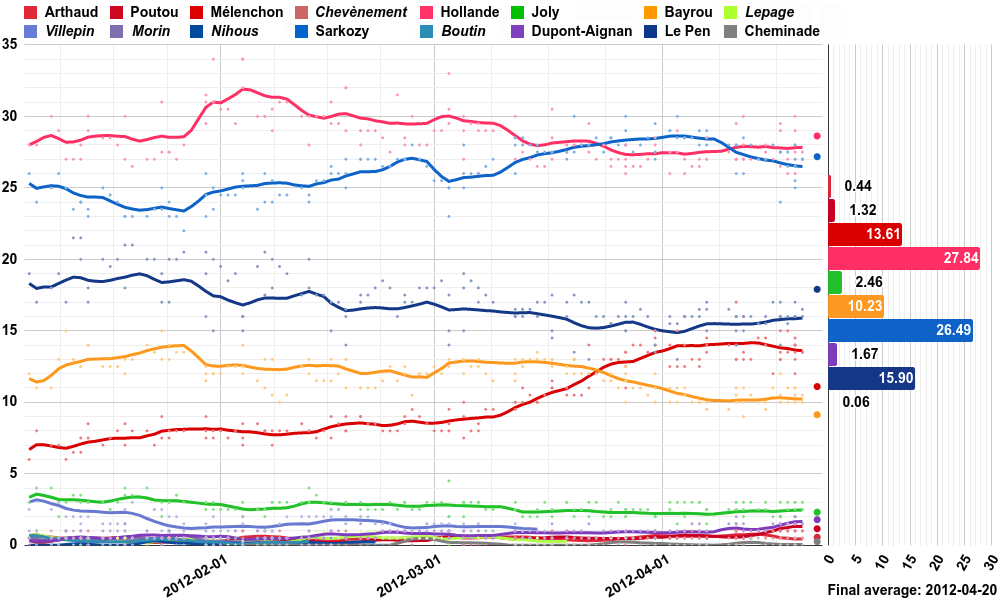

Second round

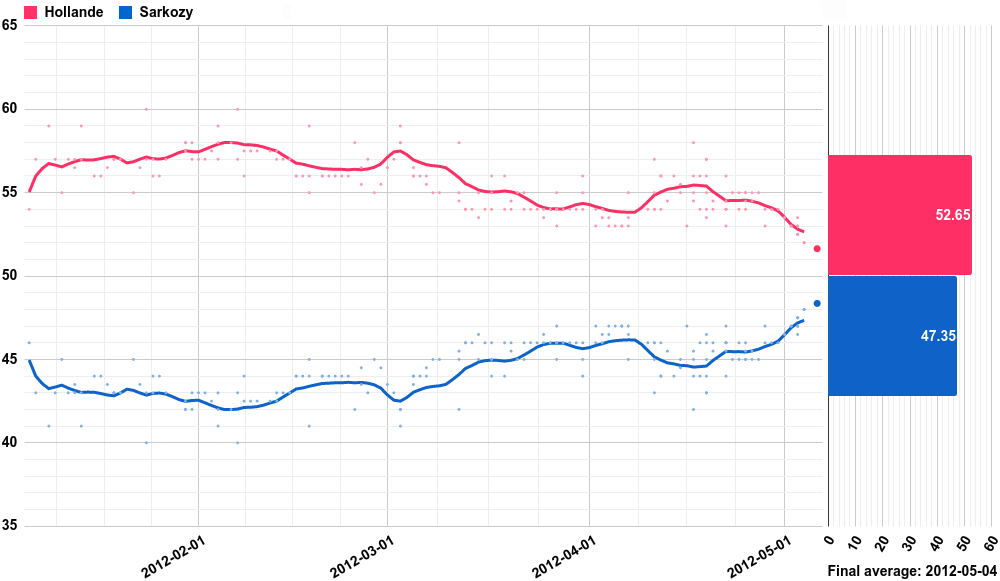

French law sets a blackout of the release of exit polls until the last polling station is closed at 20:00, with fines of up to €75,000. However, the result was leaked on Twitter, circumventing the law with code names: "Flanby" for Hollande, "le nain" (midget) for Sarkozy, Titanic for Marine Le Pen, or Tomate for Mélenchon, as well as other humorous names and metaphors were also used such as Amsterdam (for Hollande), Budapest (for Sarkozy, who has Hungarian heritage), Berlin (for Le Pen, due to the Nazi past of Germany) and Moscow (for Mélenchon, due to the Communist past of Russia). The hashtag #RadioLondres was used as it recalls the coded messages from World War II sent by Radio Londres. EU-based media outlets not subject to the French blackout law reported early exit poll results before closure of the polls, in both rounds of the election. Olivier Cimelière reported that some people saw a risk of manipulating future elections.

== Results ==
Results by commune for the 1st round of French presidential elections, 2012.: Hollande Sarkozy Le Pen Mélenchon / Bayrou Joly Dupont-Aignan Tie

François Hollande received 51.64% of the votes, while Nicolas Sarkozy secured 48.36% of the votes in the second round. Sarkozy became the first one-term president since Valéry Giscard d'Estaing lost to François Mitterrand in 1981.

Candidate	Party	First round		Second round	
Candidate	Party	Votes	%	Votes	%
François Hollande	Socialist Party	10,272,705	28.63	18,000,668	51.64
Nicolas Sarkozy (incumbent)	Union for a Popular Movement	9,753,629	27.18	16,860,685	48.36
Marine Le Pen	National Front	6,421,426	17.90		
Jean-Luc Mélenchon	Left Front	3,984,822	11.10		
François Bayrou	Democratic Movement	3,275,122	9.13		
Eva Joly	Europe Ecology – The Greens	828,345	2.31		
Nicolas Dupont-Aignan	Republic Arise	643,907	1.79		
Philippe Poutou	New Anticapitalist Party	411,160	1.15		
Nathalie Arthaud	Workers' Struggle	202,548	0.56		
Jacques Cheminade	Solidarity and Progress	89,545	0.25		
Total		35,883,209	100.00	34,861,353	100.00
Valid votes		35,883,209	98.08	34,861,353	94.18
Invalid/blank votes		701,190	1.92	2,154,956	5.82
Total votes		36,584,399	100.00	37,016,309	100.00
Registered voters/turnout		46,028,542	79.48	46,066,307	80.35
Source: Constitutional Council (First round · Second round)

=== First round ===
==== Tables ====
Results by department
Department	François Hollande		Nicolas Sarkozy		Marine Le Pen		Jean-Luc Mélenchon		François Bayrou		Eva Joly		Nicolas Dupont-Aignan		Philippe Poutou		Nathalie Arthaud		Jacques Cheminade	
Department	Votes	%	Votes	%	Votes	%	Votes	%	Votes	%	Votes	%	Votes	%	Votes	%	Votes	%	Votes	%
Ain	73,096	22.7	97,722	30.4	66,540	20.7	30,898	9.6	32,650	10.2	7,268	2.3	7,208	2.2	3,323	1.0	1,794	0.6	860	0.3
Aisne	80,751	27.1	72,090	24.2	78,452	26.3	30,360	10.2	19,895	6.7	3,455	1.2	5,853	2.0	3,860	1.3	2,490	0.8	738	0.2
Allier	61,131	29.7	49,477	24.0	37,736	18.3	27,969	13.6	17,814	8.6	3,232	1.6	4,068	2.0	2,584	1.3	1,482	0.7	457	0.2
Alpes-de-Haute-Provence	24,551	24.4	25,668	25.5	20,875	20.7	15,269	15.1	7,483	7.4	2,933	2.9	1,845	1.8	1,394	1.4	487	0.5	283	0.3
Hautes-Alpes	21,248	24.5	22,655	26.1	15,359	17.7	12,175	14.0	8,559	9.9	3,147	3.6	1,782	2.1	1,152	1.3	488	0.6	212	0.2
Alpes-Maritimes	111,990	19.2	216,738	37.2	136,982	23.5	49,493	8.5	38,980	6.7	12,556	2.2	9,241	1.6	4,048	0.7	1,576	0.3	1,238	0.2
Ardèche	52,156	26.0	47,687	23.8	40,216	20.0	28,247	14.1	18,373	9.2	5,621	2.8	3,890	1.9	2,750	1.4	1,257	0.6	521	0.3
Ardennes	44,441	28.9	37,524	24.4	37,628	24.5	14,260	9.3	11,551	7.5	1,868	1.2	2,787	1.8	1,981	1.3	1,185	0.8	366	0.2
Ariège	33,003	34.4	17,979	18.7	16,125	16.8	16,197	16.9	6,411	6.7	2,742	2.9	1,446	1.5	1,396	1.5	528	0.5	221	0.2
Aube	36,967	22.8	49,196	30.3	40,740	25.1	12,860	7.9	13,575	8.4	2,294	1.4	3,524	2.2	1,632	1.0	990	0.6	407	0.3
Aude	65,783	30.4	46,801	21.6	50,234	23.2	28,456	13.2	13,076	6.0	4,516	2.1	3,184	1.5	2,724	1.3	1,116	0.5	458	0.2
Aveyron	53,493	29.4	46,351	25.5	25,619	14.1	22,282	12.3	22,809	12.6	4,243	2.3	3,095	1.7	2,417	1.3	969	0.5	435	0.2
Bouches-du-Rhône	255,052	24.5	286,175	27.5	243,348	23.4	139,719	13.4	66,082	6.4	21,977	2.1	14,087	1.4	8,293	0.8	3,641	0.3	2,249	0.2
Calvados	117,773	29.3	109,745	27.3	65,126	16.2	42,396	10.6	40,562	10.1	8,569	2.1	8,227	2.0	5,385	1.3	2,641	0.7	1,008	0.3
Cantal	30,353	30.8	28,151	28.6	14,877	15.1	8,836	9.0	10,980	11.2	1,534	1.6	1,630	1.7	1,218	1.2	587	0.6	240	0.2
Charente	68,691	32.8	48,291	23.1	37,121	17.7	23,707	11.3	18,461	8.8	3,843	1.8	4,278	2.0	3,084	1.5	1,460	0.7	523	0.2
Charente-Maritime	107,821	28.5	106,431	28.1	66,076	17.4	39,313	10.4	34,381	9.1	8,378	2.2	7,900	2.1	5,392	1.4	2,161	0.6	888	0.2
Cher	48,608	26.8	45,331	25.0	35,825	19.7	25,079	13.8	16,048	8.8	2,861	1.6	3,825	2.1	2,218	1.2	1,387	0.8	433	0.2
Corrèze	67,070	43.0	33,706	21.6	20,784	13.3	16,462	10.5	10,824	6.9	2,155	1.4	2,577	1.7	1,581	1.0	659	0.4	277	0.2
Corse-du-Sud	16,540	22.3	23,623	31.8	19,081	25.7	7,191	9.7	4,069	5.5	1,658	2.2	797	1.1	873	1.2	220	0.3	163	0.2
Haute-Corse	22,489	26.0	26,869	31.1	20,128	23.3	8,643	10.0	3,981	4.6	2,020	2.3	930	1.1	1,001	1.2	282	0.3	174	0.2
Côte-d'Or	80,321	27.8	82,588	28.6	54,472	18.8	27,496	9.5	27,086	9.4	6,073	2.1	5,640	2.0	3,070	1.1	1,631	0.6	694	0.2
Côtes-d'Armor	125,333	33.0	90,555	23.9	51,552	13.6	46,303	12.2	40,240	10.6	10,545	2.8	6,494	1.7	5,054	1.3	2,552	0.7	909	0.2
Creuse	26,447	34.0	17,280	22.2	12,651	16.3	10,117	13.0	6,476	8.3	1,369	1.8	1,502	1.9	1,156	1.5	557	0.7	195	0.3
Dordogne	83,050	32.1	59,347	22.9	44,035	17.0	35,489	13.7	20,898	8.1	5,525	2.1	4,847	1.9	3,533	1.4	1,480	0.6	610	0.2
Doubs	76,592	26.3	83,036	28.5	55,921	19.2	31,936	11.0	25,639	8.8	6,847	2.3	5,364	1.8	3,445	1.2	1,882	0.6	750	0.3
Drôme	72,207	25.0	75,291	26.1	60,424	21.0	34,877	12.1	25,610	8.9	8,263	2.9	5,578	1.9	3,187	1.1	2,057	0.7	759	0.3
Eure	82,464	24.7	92,910	27.8	76,104	22.8	34,572	10.3	28,144	8.4	5,544	1.7	7,074	2.1	4,584	1.4	2,189	0.7	890	0.3
Eure-et-Loir	60,882	25.7	69,591	29.4	49,067	20.7	21,230	9.0	21,842	9.2	3,788	1.6	5,307	2.2	2,899	1.2	1,587	0.7	622	0.3
Finistère	188,720	33.7	136,994	24.5	67,101	12.0	64,505	11.5	63,121	11.3	16,536	3.0	9,944	1.8	8,273	1.5	3,347	0.6	1,531	0.3
Gard	100,778	24.1	103,927	24.9	106,646	25.5	55,731	13.3	28,893	6.9	8,855	2.1	6,087	1.5	4,215	1.0	1,946	0.5	948	0.2
Haute-Garonne	227,695	32.8	158,407	22.8	106,161	15.3	92,798	13.4	64,648	9.3	21,069	3.0	10,601	1.5	7,672	1.1	2,839	0.4	1,703	0.2
Gers	38,446	31.9	29,133	24.1	19,190	15.9	14,558	12.1	12,003	9.9	2,715	2.3	2,191	1.8	1,486	1.2	646	0.5	298	0.2
Gironde	260,043	31.8	203,396	24.8	127,811	15.6	96,165	11.7	79,277	9.7	19,940	2.4	13,082	1.6	13,626	1.7	3,671	0.4	1,895	0.2
Hérault	160,931	26.7	152,614	25.3	134,343	22.3	80,036	13.3	41,351	6.9	15,223	2.5	8,462	1.4	6,221	1.0	2,397	0.4	1,366	0.2
Ille-et-Vilaine	183,935	31.8	150,685	26.0	71,727	12.4	59,901	10.3	71,491	12.3	18,367	3.2	10,601	1.8	7,066	1.2	3,876	0.7	1,377	0.2
Indre	41,505	29.9	33,564	24.2	27,164	19.5	15,645	11.3	12,473	9.0	2,015	1.5	3,014	2.2	1,985	1.4	1,190	0.9	393	0.3
Indre-et-Loire	94,210	28.1	94,680	28.2	53,586	16.0	36,657	10.9	34,420	10.3	7,488	2.2	6,738	2.0	4,303	1.3	2,272	0.7	901	0.3
Isère	185,538	27.8	166,290	25.0	126,377	19.0	82,657	12.4	60,608	9.1	20,189	3.0	12,658	1.9	6,846	1.0	3,450	0.5	1,726	0.3
Jura	37,910	24.6	39,808	25.8	31,458	20.4	19,338	12.5	14,819	9.6	3,691	2.4	3,532	2.3	2,028	1.3	1,084	0.7	425	0.3
Landes	79,861	32.8	59,887	24.6	34,381	14.1	30,508	12.5	25,437	10.4	4,466	1.8	4,008	1.6	3,605	1.5	1,161	0.5	516	0.2
Loir-et-Cher	49,347	25.0	55,944	28.4	41,190	20.9	19,437	9.9	19,256	9.8	3,418	1.7	4,213	2.1	2,594	1.3	1,384	0.7	518	0.3
Loire	109,122	26.5	103,410	25.1	88,877	21.5	46,104	11.2	40,209	9.7	8,090	2.0	8,705	2.1	4,464	1.1	2,503	0.6	939	0.2
Haute-Loire	38,253	26.4	35,438	24.4	29,600	20.4	16,214	11.2	16,212	11.2	3,041	2.1	3,021	2.1	1,931	1.3	1,067	0.7	322	0.2
Loire-Atlantique	245,708	31.8	201,671	26.1	94,249	12.2	90,140	11.7	87,453	11.3	24,410	3.2	14,238	1.8	9,635	1.2	4,458	0.6	1,760	0.2
Loiret	90,617	25.5	104,350	29.3	73,264	20.6	33,923	9.5	33,133	9.3	6,744	1.9	7,512	2.1	3,610	1.0	2,007	0.6	885	0.2
Lot	39,369	34.5	24,447	21.4	15,376	13.5	16,400	14.4	10,648	9.3	3,046	2.7	2,212	1.9	1,650	1.4	623	0.5	299	0.3
Lot-et-Garonne	52,893	26.9	49,768	25.3	42,080	21.4	22,966	11.7	17,394	8.9	3,775	1.9	3,522	1.8	2,699	1.4	974	0.5	461	0.2
Lozère	12,579	25.2	13,885	27.8	8,650	17.3	6,208	12.4	5,505	11.0	1,307	2.6	843	1.7	647	1.3	263	0.5	119	0.2
Maine-et-Loire	123,534	27.1	136,420	29.9	63,252	13.9	42,601	9.3	58,196	12.8	10,737	2.4	10,087	2.2	6,338	1.4	3,426	0.8	1,182	0.3
Manche	82,773	27.0	88,234	28.8	50,927	16.6	30,167	9.9	34,272	11.2	5,601	1.8	6,936	2.3	4,131	1.3	2,206	0.7	882	0.3
Marne	71,432	24.1	88,707	29.9	66,640	22.4	25,292	8.5	28,210	9.5	4,482	1.5	6,029	2.0	3,534	1.2	1,949	0.7	712	0.2
Haute-Marne	25,970	23.7	30,604	28.0	27,624	25.3	9,720	8.9	8,712	8.0	1,506	1.4	2,637	2.4	1,455	1.3	860	0.8	265	0.2
Mayenne	47,146	25.9	55,945	30.7	26,930	14.8	15,136	8.3	25,118	13.8	3,864	2.1	3,897	2.1	2,392	1.3	1,415	0.8	428	0.2
Meurthe-et-Moselle	|108,870	27.9	94,415	24.2	82,538	21.2	47,042	12.1	33,871	8.7	7,058	1.8	7,447	1.9	4,988	1.3	2,582	0.7	1,092	0.3
Meuse	26,313	23.4	29,863	26.6	29,038	25.8	9,951	8.8	10,375	9.2	1,794	1.6	2,299	2.0	1,688	1.5	789	0.7	344	0.3
Morbihan	130,453	28.3	129,838	28.2	71,715	15.6	47,220	10.2	50,050	10.9	12,948	2.8	8,548	1.9	6,300	1.4	2,818	0.6	1,268	0.3
Moselle	140,323	24.5	148,328	25.9	141,477	24.7	54,455	9.5	53,160	9.3	9,875	1.7	10,658	1.9	7,924	1.4	4,350	0.8	1,522	0.3
Nièvre	42,631	32.6	29,400	22.5	25,565	19.6	15,601	11.9	9,746	7.5	2,143	1.6	2,563	2.0	1,675	1.3	934	0.7	338	0.3
Nord	383,471	28.0	338,714	24.7	300,362	21.9	173,037	12.6	102,511	7.5	23,976	1.7	21,160	1.5	15,138	1.1	9,545	0.7	3,185	0.2
Oise	108,574	24.9	115,926	26.6	109,339	25.1	44,057	10.1	33,160	7.6	6,598	1.5	8,505	2.0	5,338	1.2	3,391	0.8	1,081	0.2
Orne	42,159	24.3	51,498	29.6	34,757	20.0	15,501	8.9	18,326	10.5	3,109	1.8	4,173	2.4	2,515	1.4	1,294	0.7	422	0.2
Pas-de-Calais	249,971	29.4	185,632	21.9	216,753	25.5	97,974	11.5	54,354	6.4	10,315	1.2	14,122	1.7	10,948	1.3	7,246	0.9	1,824	0.2
Puy-de-Dôme	122,244	33.1	79,124	21.4	57,555	15.6	51,691	14.0	36,771	10.0	7,549	2.0	6,555	1.8	4,595	1.2	2,372	0.6	988	0.3
Pyrénées-Atlantiques	117,823	29.9	92,967	23.6	47,844	12.2	46,749	11.9	61,681	15.7	11,345	2.9	5,728	1.5	6,812	1.7	1,826	0.5	882	0.2
Hautes-Pyrénées	47,983	33.2	29,512	20.4	21,580	14.9	21,934	15.2	15,265	10.5	3,007	2.1	2,376	1.6	1,967	1.4	780	0.5	300	0.2
Pyrénées-Orientales	68,593	26.0	66,870	25.3	64,007	24.2	33,739	12.8	16,608	6.3	5,564	2.1	3,652	1.4	3,265	1.2	1,305	0.5	591	0.2
Bas-Rhin	114,702	19.6	196,968	33.6	124,264	21.2	42,302	7.2	69,940	11.9	16,188	2.8	10,141	1.7	5,993	1.0	3,779	0.6	1,655	0.3
Haut-Rhin	76,580	18.9	129,349	31.9	94,988	23.4	30,076	7.4	46,176	11.4	10,980	2.7	8,508	2.1	4,824	1.2	2,608	0.6	1,322	0.3
Rhône	237,779	26.9	271,922	30.8	133,322	15.1	94,876	10.7	91,042	10.3	25,611	2.9	15,203	1.7	7,412	0.8	4,220	0.5	2,264	0.3
Haute-Saône	38,661	26.4	36,967	25.2	36,807	25.1	14,125	9.6	11,147	7.6	2,315	1.6	2,982	2.0	1,999	1.4	1,126	0.8	407	0.3
Saône-et-Loire	93,198	28.7	84,499	26.0	65,054	20.0	34,548	10.6	28,683	8.8	5,435	1.7	6,588	2.0	3,971	1.2	2,048	0.6	802	0.2
Sarthe	91,722	28.1	86,174	26.4	62,516	19.2	35,143	10.8	29,802	9.1	6,153	1.9	7,012	2.2	4,379	1.3	2,452	0.8	749	0.2
Savoie	57,469	23.6	69,544	28.6	45,993	18.9	27,875	11.5	24,034	9.9	8,313	3.4	5,120	2.1	2,890	1.2	1,213	0.5	664	0.3
Haute-Savoie	82,482	20.5	136,946	34.1	66,583	16.6	37,117	9.2	47,547	11.8	14,446	3.6	9,345	2.3	4,514	1.1	1,793	0.4	1,242	0.3
Paris	345,635	34.8	319,482	32.2	61,503	6.2	110,101	11.1	92,664	9.3	41,495	4.2	9,959	1.0	6,644	0.7	2,719	0.3	2,272	0.2
Seine-Maritime	204,448	29.4	174,024	25.0	131,416	18.9	91,759	13.2	54,446	7.8	11,356	1.6	12,445	1.8	8,918	1.3	4,918	0.7	1,671	0.2
Seine-et-Marne	178,537	27.6	176,116	27.3	126,889	19.6	71,097	11.0	55,187	8.5	12,684	2.0	14,055	2.2	6,584	1.0	2,995	0.5	1,654	0.3
Yvelines	196,485	27.3	246,328	34.2	89,491	12.4	65,520	9.1	80,848	11.2	17,974	2.5	12,434	1.7	5,720	0.8	2,505	0.3	2,008	0.3
Deux-Sèvres	73,911	33.3	55,462	25.0	30,077	13.6	22,709	10.2	24,395	11.0	4,480	2.0	4,952	2.2	3,550	1.6	1,612	0.7	567	0.3
Somme	93,379	28.4	78,680	23.9	78,250	23.8	36,213	11.0	24,066	7.3	4,031	1.2	6,653	2.0	4,222	1.3	2,917	0.9	726	0.2
Tarn	72,647	30.7	55,099	23.3	44,806	18.9	28,800	12.2	21,724	9.2	5,064	2.1	3,850	1.6	2,962	1.3	1,212	0.5	550	0.2
Tarn-et-Garonne	40,297	27.6	36,666	25.1	32,228	22.1	16,313	11.2	12,075	8.3	2,867	2.0	2,564	1.8	1,769	1.2	698	0.5	367	0.3
Var	118,023	19.6	209,233	34.8	149,187	24.8	54,553	9.1	40,004	6.7	11,334	1.9	9,809	1.6	5,239	0.9	2,094	0.3	1,254	0.2
Vaucluse	69,878	22.3	85,898	27.5	84,585	27.0	34,879	11.1	21,070	6.7	7,062	2.3	4,679	1.5	2,981	1.0	1,207	0.4	650	0.2
Vendée	101,079	24.8	133,985	32.9	61,859	15.2	34,471	8.5	49,402	12.1	7,652	1.9	9,486	2.3	5,893	1.4	2,584	0.6	973	0.2
Vienne	78,591	32.0	60,188	24.5	40,321	16.4	27,037	11.0	23,565	9.6	5,335	2.2	5,038	2.1	3,321	1.4	1,741	0.7	553	0.2
Haute-Vienne	78,249	35.9	43,225	19.8	35,821	16.4	31,304	14.4	17,189	7.9	3,925	1.8	3,634	1.7	2,641	1.2	1,435	0.7	516	0.2
Vosges	56,495	24.7	57,964	25.3	55,339	24.2	22,162	9.7	21,516	9.4	4,026	1.8	5,450	2.4	3,573	1.6	1,716	0.7	661	0.3
Yonne	46,667	24.0	53,719	27.6	46,057	23.7	19,540	10.0	16,472	8.5	3,426	1.8	4,310	2.2	2,477	1.3	1,324	0.7	484	0.2
Territoire de Belfort	19,484	26.0	17,891	23.9	17,786	23.7	8,547	11.4	6,630	8.8	1,516	2.0	1,343	1.8	988	1.3	523	0.7	215	0.3
Essonne	181,506	30.4	152,079	25.5	90,760	15.2	73,240	12.3	55,738	9.3	14,027	2.3	20,392	3.4	5,591	0.9	2,462	0.4	1,456	0.2
Hauts-de-Seine	221,233	30.2	256,570	35.0	62,447	8.5	75,911	10.3	78,397	10.7	20,086	2.7	9,851	1.3	5,031	0.7	2,187	0.3	1,939	0.3
Seine-Saint-Denis	206,537	38.7	104,010	19.5	72,335	13.5	90,710	17.0	32,661	6.1	11,781	2.2	6,978	1.3	4,936	0.9	2,708	0.5	1,259	0.2
Val-de-Marne	192,781	32.9	155,552	26.6	69,399	11.9	81,950	14.0	51,892	8.9	15,392	2.6	9,735	1.7	4,946	0.8	2,217	0.4	1,498	0.3
Val-d'Oise	172,658	32.4	139,863	26.3	83,102	15.6	63,679	12.0	44,683	8.4	10,907	2.0	9,049	1.7	5,109	1.0	2,340	0.4	1,325	0.2
French Guiana	15,943	42.6	10,174	27.2	3,920	10.5	2,952	7.9	2,329	6.2	843	2.3	416	1.1	479	1.3	208	0.6	148	0.4
French Polynesia	29,130	32.4	40,611	45.2	5,151	5.7	2,492	2.8	5,139	5.7	3,392	3.8	2,484	2.8	532	0.6	510	0.6	378	0.4
Guadeloupe	82,735	57.0	33,973	23.4	7,486	5.2	7,806	5.4	6,861	4.7	2,134	1.5	1,237	0.9	1,151	0.8	1,335	0.9	441	0.3
Martinique	76,034	52.0	38,443	26.3	6,960	4.8	8,600	5.9	8,681	5.9	2,275	1.6	1,563	1.1	1,712	1.2	1,442	1.0	560	0.4
Mayotte	13,152	36.6	17,536	48.7	996	2.8	944	2.6	1,505	4.2	789	2.2	395	1.1	299	0.8	192	0.5	175	0.5
New Caledonia	22,235	24.9	44,302	49.6	10,409	11.7	2,927	3.3	4,579	5.1	2,336	2.6	833	0.9	874	1.0	485	0.5	279	0.3
Réunion	194,009	53.3	65,377	18.0	37,549	10.3	24,503	6.7	24,853	6.8	7,737	2.1	3,631	1.0	3,170	0.9	2,190	0.6	1,066	0.3
Saint Martin/Saint Barthélemy	2,151	26.8	3,504	43.6	975	12.1	473	5.9	473	5.9	208	2.6	92	1.1	85	1.1	44	0.5	28	0.3
Saint Pierre and Miquelon	888	33.8	488	18.5	416	15.8	399	15.2	194	7.4	43	1.6	64	2.4	103	3.9	23	0.9	13	0.5
Wallis and Futuna	3,093	48.3	2,414	37.7	152	2.4	76	1.2	410	6.4	100	1.6	43	0.7	42	0.7	48	0.7	29	0.5
Total	10,272,705	28.63	9,753,629	27.18	6,421,426	17.90	3,984,822	11.10	3,275,122	9.13	828,345	2.31	643,907	1.79	411,160	1.15	202,548	0.56	89,545	0.25
Source: European Election Database

Results by region
Region	François Hollande		Nicolas Sarkozy		Marine Le Pen		Jean-Luc Mélenchon		François Bayrou		Eva Joly		Nicolas Dupont-Aignan		Philippe Poutou		Nathalie Arthaud		Jacques Cheminade	
Region	Votes	%	Votes	%	Votes	%	Votes	%	Votes	%	Votes	%	Votes	%	Votes	%	Votes	%	Votes	%
Alsace	191,282	19.30	326,317	32.92	219,252	22.12	72,378	7.30	116,116	11.71	27,168	2.74	18,649	1.88	10,817	1.09	6,387	0.64	2,977	0.30
Aquitaine	593,670	31.05	465,365	24.34	296,151	15.49	231,877	12.13	204,687	10.71	45,051	2.36	31,187	1.63	30,275	1.58	9,112	0.48	4,364	0.23
Auvergne	251,981	30.77	192,190	23.47	139,768	17.07	104,710	12.79	81,777	9.99	15,356	1.88	15,274	1.87	10,328	1.26	5,508	0.67	2,007	0.25
Brittany	628,441	31.74	508,072	25.66	262,095	13.24	217,929	11.36	224,902	11.01	58,396	2.95	35,587	1.80	26,693	1.35	12,593	0.64	5,085	0.26
Burgundy	262,817	27.99	250,206	26.65	191,148	20.36	97,185	10.35	81,987	8.73	17,077	1.82	19,101	2.03	11,193	1.19	5,937	0.63	2,318	0.25
Centre	385,169	26.64	403,460	27.90	280,096	19.37	151,971	10.51	137,172	9.49	26,314	1.82	30,609	2.12	17,609	1.22	9,827	0.68	3,752	0.26
Champagne-Ardenne	178,810	24.76	206,031	28.53	172,632	23.91	62,132	8.60	62,048	8.59	10,150	1.41	14,977	2.07	8,602	1.19	4,984	0.69	1,750	0.24
Corsica	39,029	24.28	50,492	31.41	39,209	24.39	15,834	9.85	8,050	5.01	3,678	2.29	1,727	1.07	1,874	1.17	502	0.31	337	0.21
Franche-Comté	172,647	25.89	177,702	26.64	141,972	21.29	73,946	11.09	58,235	8.73	14,369	2.15	13,221	1.98	8,460	1.27	4,615	0.69	1,797	0.27
Île de France	1,695,372	31.75	1,550,000	29.02	655,926	12.28	632,208	11.84	492,070	9.21	144,346	2.70	92,453	1.73	44,561	0.83	20,133	0.38	13,411	0.25
Languedoc-Roussillon	408,664	26.34	384,097	24.76	363,880	23.45	204,170	13.16	105,433	6.80	35,465	2.29	22,228	1.43	17,072	1.10	7,027	0.45	3,482	0.22
Limousin	171,766	38.02	94,211	20.85	69,256	15.33	57,883	12.81	34,489	7.63	7,449	1.65	7,713	1.71	5,378	1.19	2,651	0.59	988	0.22
Lorraine	332,001	25.47	330,570	25.36	308,392	23.66	133,610	10.25	118,922	9.12	22,753	1.75	25,854	1.98	18,173	1.39	9,437	0.72	3,619	0.28
Lower Normandy	242,705	27.54	249,477	28.31	150,810	17.11	88,064	9.99	93,160	10.57	17,279	1.96	19,336	2.19	12,031	1.37	6,141	0.70	2,312	0.26
Midi-Pyrénées	552,933	31.90	397,594	22.94	281,085	16.22	229,282	13.23	165,583	9.55	44,753	2.58	28,335	1.63	21,319	1.23	8,295	0.48	4,173	0.24
Nord-Pas-de-Calais	633,442	28.53	524,346	23.62	517,115	23.29	271,011	12.21	156,865	7.07	34,291	1.54	35,282	1.59	26,086	1.17	16,791	0.76	5,009	0.23
Pays de la Loire	609,189	28.40	614,195	28.63	308,806	14.39	217,491	10.14	249,971	11.65	52,816	2.46	44,720	2.08	28,637	1.33	14,335	0.67	5,092	0.24
Picardy	282,704	26.59	266,696	25.09	266,041	25.03	110,630	10.41	77,121	7.25	14,084	1.32	21,011	1.98	13,420	1.26	8,798	0.83	2,545	0.24
Poitou-Charentes	329,014	31.17	270,372	25.61	173,595	16.45	112,766	10.68	100,802	9.55	22,036	2.09	22,168	2.10	15,347	1.45	6,974	0.66	2,531	0.24
Provence-Alpes-Côte d'Azur	600,742	22.05	846,367	31.06	650,336	23.87	306,088	11.23	182,178	6.69	59,009	2.17	41,443	1.52	23,107	0.85	9,493	0.35	5,886	0.22
Rhône-Alpes	869,849	25.45	968,812	28.35	628,332	18.38	382,651	11.20	340,073	9.95	97,801	2.86	67,707	1.98	35,386	1.04	18,287	0.53	8,975	0.26
Upper Normandy	286,912	27.86	266,934	25.92	207,520	20.15	126,331	12.27	82,590	8.02	16,900	1.64	19,519	1.90	13,502	1.31	7,107	0.69	2,561	0.25
French Guiana	15,943	42.61	10,174	27.20	3,920	10.48	2,952	7.89	2,329	6.23	843	2.25	416	1.11	479	1.28	208	0.56	148	0.40
French Polynesia	29,130	32.43	40,611	45.21	5,151	5.73	2,492	2.77	5,139	5.72	3,392	3.78	2,484	2.77	532	0.59	510	0.57	378	0.42
Guadeloupe	82,735	57.00	33,973	23.40	7,486	5.16	7,806	5.38	6,861	4.73	2,134	1.47	1,237	0.85	1,151	0.79	1,335	0.92	441	0.30
Martinique	76,034	51.98	38,443	26.28	6,960	4.76	8,600	5.88	8,681	5.93	2,275	1.56	1,563	1.07	1,712	1.17	1,442	0.99	560	0.38
Mayotte	13,152	36.55	17,536	48.73	996	2.77	944	2.62	1,505	4.18	789	2.19	395	1.10	299	0.83	192	0.53	175	0.49
New Caledonia	22,235	24.91	44,302	49.63	10,409	11.66	2,927	3.28	4,579	5.13	2,336	2.62	833	0.93	874	0.98	485	0.54	279	0.31
Réunion	194,009	53.29	65,377	17.96	37,549	10.31	24,503	6.73	24,853	6.83	7,737	2.13	3,631	1.00	3,170	0.87	2,190	0.60	1,066	0.29
Saint Barthélemy and Saint Martin	2,151	26.78	3,504	43.62	975	12.14	473	5.89	473	5.89	208	2.59	92	1.15	85	1.06	44	0.55	28	0.35
Saint Pierre and Miquelon	888	33.75	488	18.55	416	15.81	399	15.17	194	7.37	43	1.63	64	2.43	103	3.91	23	0.87	13	0.49
Wallis and Futuna	3,093	48.28	2,414	37.68	152	2.37	76	1.19	410	6.40	100	1.56	43	0.67	42	0.66	48	0.75	29	0.45
Total	10,272,705	28.63	9,753,629	27.18	6,421,426	17.90	3,984,822	11.10	3,275,122	9.13	828,345	2.31	643,907	1.79	411,160	1.15	202,548	0.56	89,545	0.25
Source: European Election Database

=== Second round ===
Second Round 2007–2012 Swing by Departement Swing: +21% Sarkozy; +2-4% Hollande; +4-6% Hollande; +6-8% Hollande; +8-10% Hollande; +10-12% Hollande; +12-14% Hollande; +>14% Hollande

==== Tables ====
Results by department
Department	François Hollande		Nicolas Sarkozy	
Department	Votes	%	Votes	%
Ain	131,365	42.78%	175,706	57.22%
Aisne	147,260	52.40%	133,760	47.60%
Allier	111,615	56.89%	84,593	43.11%
Alpes-de-Haute-Provence	49,498	51.06%	47,444	48.94%
Hautes-Alpes	42,624	50.91%	41,098	49.09%
Alpes-Maritimes	203,708	35.77%	365,813	64.23%
Ardèche	101,526	53.45%	88,429	46.55%
Ardennes	75,630	51.89%	70,119	48.11%
Ariège	59,466	64.69%	32,452	35.31%
Aube	65,548	42.63%	88,210	57.37%
Aude	115,398	56.24%	89,793	43.76%
Aveyron	95,297	54.42%	79,802	45.58%
Bouches-du-Rhône	474,704	47.17%	531,652	52.83%
Calvados	205,525	53.11%	181,423	46.89%
Cantal	49,543	51.80%	46,097	48.20%
Charente	118,100	58.83%	82,648	41.17%
Charente-Maritime	188,387	51.57%	176,944	48.43%
Cher	92,857	54.04%	78,959	45.96%
Corrèze	98,764	64.86%	53,502	35.14%
Corse-du-Sud	30,791	42.40%	41,834	57.60%
Haute-Corse	39,357	45.59%	46,965	54.41%
Côte-d'Or	134,929	48.45%	143,559	51.55%
Côtes-d'Armor	217,604	59.19%	150,035	40.81%
Creuse	45,870	61.02%	29,306	38.98%
Dordogne	148,011	59.14%	102,280	40.86%
Doubs	134,568	48.09%	145,269	51.91%
Drôme	134,959	49.18%	139,436	50.82%
Eure	151,327	47.55%	166,949	52.45%
Eure-et-Loir	105,676	46.53%	121,452	53.47%
Finistère	319,304	58.87%	223,115	41.13%
Gard	193,487	48.80%	202,995	51.20%
Haute-Garonne	388,811	58.78%	272,683	41.22%
Gers	65,605	56.64%	50,221	43.36%
Gironde	448,634	56.61%	343,866	43.39%
Hérault	296,422	51.31%	281,240	48.69%
Ille-et-Vilaine	309,763	55.71%	246,303	44.29%
Indre	73,616	55.66%	58,643	44.34%
Indre-et-Loire	165,293	51.23%	157,374	48.77%
Isère	331,448	52.12%	304,429	47.88%
Jura	72,321	49.42%	74,004	50.58%
Landes	134,872	56.99%	101,792	43.01%
Loir-et-Cher	89,182	47.57%	98,275	52.43%
Loire	196,522	50.50%	192,621	49.50%
Haute-Loire	70,488	51.38%	66,703	48.62%
Loire-Atlantique	419,484	56.35%	324,893	43.65%
Loiret	156,289	45.97%	183,671	54.03%
Lot	67,981	61.89%	41,862	38.11%
Lot-et-Garonne	96,766	51.35%	91,663	48.65%
Lozère	23,991	49.95%	24,036	50.05%
Maine-et-Loire	213,611	48.85%	223,644	51.15%
Manche	147,005	49.90%	147,590	50.10%
Marne	126,155	44.69%	156,159	55.31%
Haute-Marne	46,965	45.57%	56,085	54.43%
Mayenne	81,922	46.93%	92,647	53.07%
Meurthe-et-Moselle	196,628	53.06%	173,929	46.94%
Meuse	48,860	46.20%	56,898	53.80%
Morbihan	229,248	51.73%	213,893	48.27%
Moselle	253,371	46.52%	291,278	53.48%
Nièvre	73,424	58.81%	51,421	41.19%
Nord	692,273	52.88%	616,882	47.12%
Oise	195,701	47.34%	217,732	52.66%
Orne	77,579	47.11%	87,087	52.89%
Pas-de-Calais	450,103	56.18%	351,015	43.82%
Puy-de-Dôme	212,750	60.46%	139,145	39.54%
Pyrénées-Atlantiques	218,964	57.12%	164,374	42.88%
Hautes-Pyrénées	86,803	62.47%	52,154	37.53%
Pyrénées-Orientales	127,625	50.59%	124,668	49.41%
Bas-Rhin	206,891	36.56%	359,011	63.44%
Haut-Rhin	142,724	36.67%	246,527	63.33%
Rhône	408,899	47.98%	443,370	52.02%
Haute-Saône	68,653	49.64%	69,658	50.36%
Saône-et-Loire	160,751	51.86%	149,243	48.14%
Sarthe	162,975	52.67%	146,454	47.33%
Savoie	108,691	47.07%	122,228	52.93%
Haute-Savoie	154,622	39.90%	232,928	60.10%
Paris	560,461	55.60%	447,500	44.40%
Seine-Maritime	366,616	54.94%	300,657	45.06%
Seine-et-Marne	315,566	49.25%	325,147	50.75%
Yvelines	333,057	45.70%	395,697	54.30%
Deux-Sèvres	122,858	57.31%	91,527	42.69%
Somme	170,529	54.41%	142,894	45.59%
Tarn	125,132	55.55%	100,109	44.45%
Tarn-et-Garonne	71,186	51.25%	67,705	48.75%
Var	217,383	37.36%	364,467	62.64%
Vaucluse	130,278	43.57%	168,753	56.43%
Vendée	173,717	44.41%	217,449	55.59%
Vienne	134,875	57.15%	101,138	42.85%
Haute-Vienne	133,467	63.99%	75,095	36.01%
Vosges	105,371	49.06%	109,404	50.94%
Yonne	86,610	46.88%	98,122	53.12%
Territoire de Belfort	35,865	50.52%	35,121	49.48%
Essonne	317,663	53.43%	276,859	46.57%
Hauts-de-Seine	369,128	49.48%	376,816	50.52%
Seine-Saint-Denis	353,260	65.32%	187,562	34.68%
Val-de-Marne	333,347	56.48%	256,900	43.52%
Val-d'Oise	289,520	53.91%	247,541	46.09%
French Guiana	25,880	62.05%	15,830	37.95%
French Polynesia	50,097	46.74%	57,080	53.26%
Guadeloupe	123,821	71.94%	48,292	28.06%
Martinique	114,527	68.43%	52,829	31.57%
Mayotte	18,948	49.06%	19,677	50.94%
New Caledonia	36,239	36.97%	61,772	63.03%
Réunion	286,109	71.49%	114,120	28.51%
Saint Martin/Saint Barthélemy	3,851	40.57%	5,641	59.43%
Saint Pierre and Miquelon	2,080	65.31%	1,105	34.69%
Wallis and Futuna	3,795	56.06%	2,974	43.94%
Total	18,000,668	51.64%	16,860,685	48.36%
Source: European Election Database

Results by region
Region	François Hollande		Nicolas Sarkozy	
Region	Votes	%	Votes	%
Alsace	349,615	36.60%	605,538	63.40%
Aquitaine	1,047,247	56.57%	803,975	43.43%
Auvergne	444,396	56.91%	336,538	43.09%
Brittany	1,075,919	56.35%	833,346	43.65%
Burgundy	455,714	50.74%	442,345	49.26%
Centre	682,913	49.44%	698,374	50.56%
Champagne-Ardenne	314,298	45.89%	370,573	54.11%
Corsica	70,148	44.13%	88,799	55.87%
Franche-Comté	311,407	49.01%	324,052	50.99%
Île de France	2,872,002	53.32%	2,514,022	46.68%
Languedoc-Roussillon	756,923	51.16%	722,732	48.84%
Limousin	278,101	63.78%	157,903	36.22%
Lorraine	604,230	48.90%	631,509	51.10%
Lower Normandy	430,109	50.83%	416,100	49.17%
Midi-Pyrénées	960,281	57.94%	696,988	42.06%
Nord-Pas-de-Calais	1,142,376	54.13%	967,897	45.87%
Pays de la Loire	1,051,709	51.13%	1,005,087	48.87%
Picardy	513,490	50.95%	494,386	49.05%
Poitou-Charentes	564,220	55.51%	452,257	44.49%
Provence-Alpes-Côte d'Azur	1,118,195	42.40%	1,519,227	57.60%
Rhône-Alpes	1,568,032	47.99%	1,699,147	52.01%
Upper Normandy	517,943	52.55%	467,606	47.45%
French Guiana	25,880	62.05%	15,830	37.95%
French Polynesia	50,097	46.74%	57,080	53.26%
Guadeloupe	123,821	71.94%	48,292	28.06%
Martinique	114,527	68.43%	52,829	31.57%
Mayotte	18,948	49.06%	19,677	50.94%
New Caledonia	36,239	36.97%	61,772	63.03%
Réunion	286,109	71.49%	114,120	28.51%
Saint Martin/Saint Barthélemy	3,851	40.57%	5,641	59.43%
Saint Pierre and Miquelon	2,080	65.31%	1,105	34.69%
Wallis and Futuna	3,795	56.06%	2,974	43.94%
French overseas voters	206,053	46.94%	232,964	53.06%
Total	18,000,668	51.64%	16,860,685	48.36%
Source: European Election Database

Candidates who came out on top in each country in the first round of 2012 French presidential election.
François Hollande
Marine Le Pen
Nicolas Sarkozy

Candidate who came out on top abroad.
François Hollande
Nicolas Sarkozy
Tie

== Reactions ==
Sarkozy called for UMP to "stay together. We must win the battle of the legislatives" and said that "in this new era, I will remain one of you, but my place will no longer be the same. My engagement with the life of my country will now be different, but time will never strain the bonds between us." Hollande then spoke at a victory rally in Tulle where he said:

To those who haven't voted for me, let them know that I hear them, and that I will be president to all. There is one France, united in the same destiny. We will never be apart, how beautiful life is tonight!

He then travelled to Paris, where supporters of the Socialist Party gathered outside the headquarters. He also said that "Europe is watching us. Austerity isn't inevitable. My mission now is to give European construction a growth dimension."

=== International reactions ===
- Andorra – In electing the President of France, French citizens had also elected one of the two heads of state of Andorra. Prime Minister Antoni Martí congratulated François Hollande, expressing his confidence both in the continuation of the "excellent" relationship between Andorra and France, and in Hollande's awareness of the importance of his role as Co-Prince of Andorra. Jaume Bartumeu, of Andorra's Social Democratic Party (in opposition), described Hollande's victory as "the beginning of the resurgence of social democracy in Europe".
- Belgium – Prime Minister Elio Di Rupo welcomed the election of his "friend", adding: "François Hollande's proposals on economic growth [...] will have a positive impact for all Europeans and on European authorities".
- Denmark – Prime Minister Helle Thorning-Schmidt congratulated Hollande for his win.
- Germany – Chancellor Angela Merkel sent her congratulations to Hollande and said that she and Foreign Minister Guido Westerwelle "agreed to discuss the kind of growth pact that Hollande has championed."
- Italy – Prime Minister Mario Monti congratulated François Hollande, saying he looked forward to a "close collaboration" within the European framework, the aim of which would be "an ever-more efficient union with economic growth as its objective". He added that the results of the French and Greek elections required thinking about European policies, adding that in his view public spending should be concentrated on "productive investments" and avoid increasing debts.
- Spain – Prime Minister Mariano Rajoy expressed congratulations, saying he looked forward to "fruitful bilateral and Europeans relations" with the new president.
- United Kingdom – Prime Minister David Cameron congratulated François Hollande and said he looked forward to the two countries maintaining their "very close relationship". Opposition Leader Ed Miliband applauded Hollande's "determination to help create a Europe focused on growth and job creation, in a responsible and sustainable manner. [...] We are in great need of this new direction as Europe seeks to escape from austerity. I'm impatient to work with him in the months and years to come".
- United States – President Barack Obama congratulated Hollande for his victory and invited him to the White House.

== See also ==
- President of France
- Politics of France
- French presidential elections under the Fifth Republic
