= History of social housing in France =

Social housing in France refers to publicly or privately initiated housing intended for people with modest incomes who face difficulties accessing the private market. The term covers the construction, occupation, and management of this housing stock. It originates from workers’ housing, which historically took collective, grouped, or individual forms. By the end of 2008, social rental housing represented 17% of main residences, with a total of 4.3 million units.

The history of social housing in France dates back to the late 18th century. In the 19th century, various initiatives emerged that eventually led to public financing of social housing in the 20th century and later to the DALO law. This history is generally divided into four main periods: the precursors (1775–1880s), the development of low-cost housing and the first laws (1880s–1920s), the era of large-scale construction (1920s–1970s), and legislative developments (1970s–2000s).

According to a study by the Banque des Territoires in 2025, building new or renovated social housing seems impossible given the budgetary equation in France.

== The time of the precursors ==
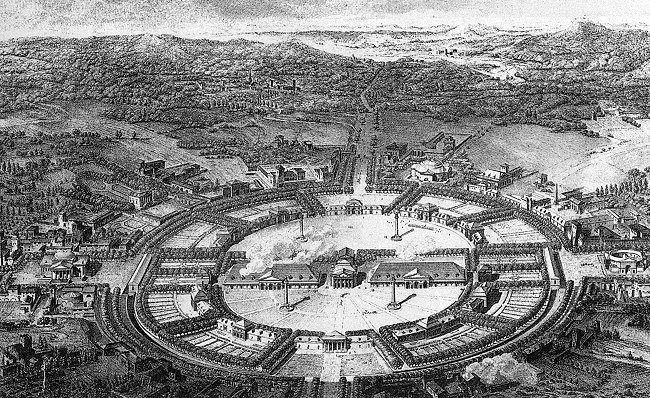
Project for the town of Chaux around the Arc-et-Senans saltworks.

Concern for housing low-income families has ancient origins. Two thousand years ago, Roman patricians built dwellings for their clients, the plebeians, who were lower-class citizens distinct from slaves.

In rural areas, when labor was abundant, farmers often provided housing for workers. The development of workers’ housing in France began more systematically in the mid-19th century, following the experiment of the Royal Saltworks of Arc-et-Senans, and later evolved into what became known as social housing.

In 1775, architect Claude-Nicolas Ledoux designed the Royal Saltworks of Arc-et-Senans, considered one of the first examples of industrial architecture. The complex included technical facilities, workers’ housing, and gardens, functioning as an integrated site where much of the working community resided.

=== Consequences of the second cholera pandemic in Paris ===
The 18,602 deaths in Paris during the 1832 cholera outbreak, part of the second cholera pandemic (1826–1841), led physicians to investigate its causes. Alexandre Parent du Châtelet and Louis René Villermé attributed the spread to unsanitary and overcrowded housing among the poor. From this point, it was recognized that cholera was intensified by overcrowding and poverty rather than by soil or weather conditions.

=== The first workers’ housing estates in Paris and Lille ===
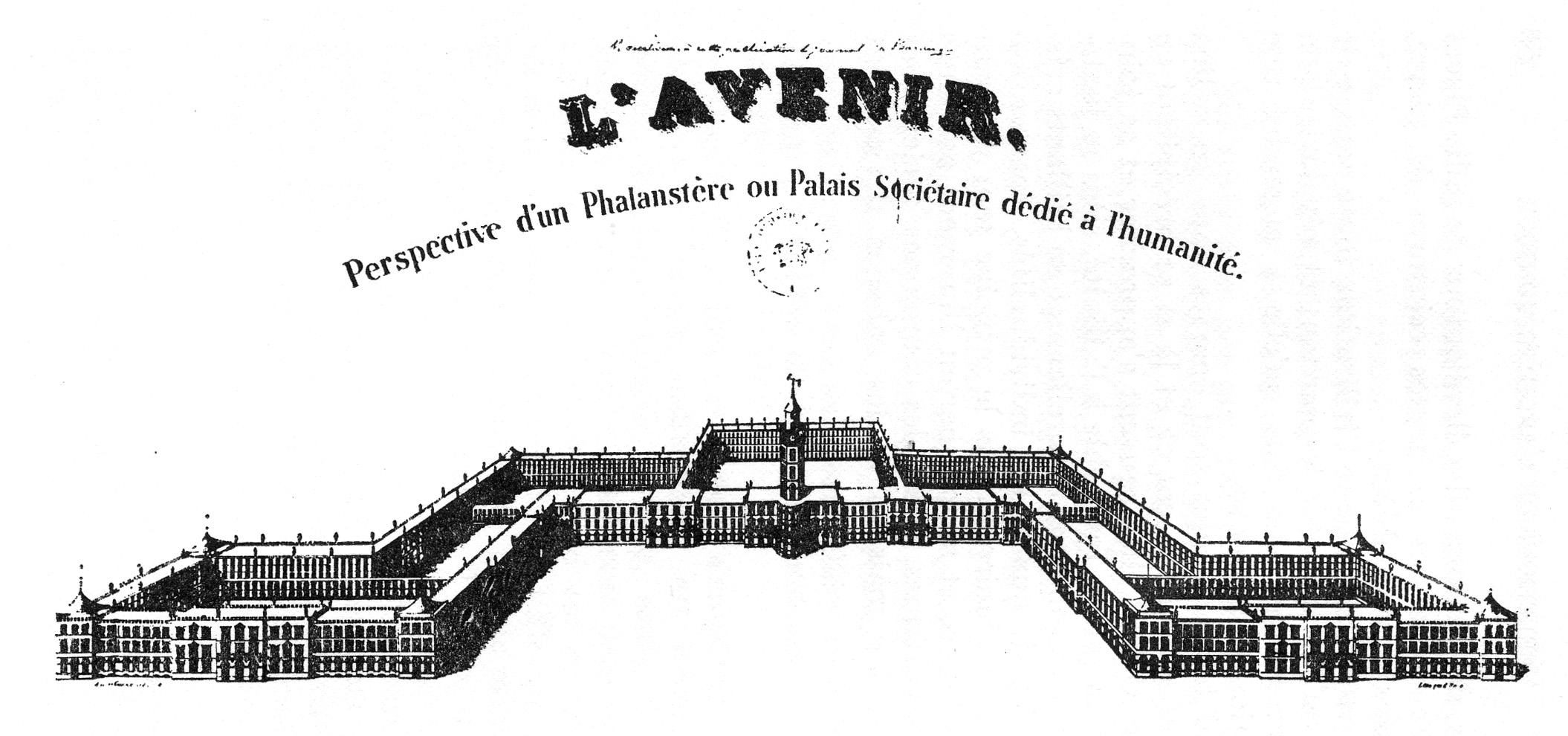
Perspective view of a phalanstery.

In 1849, architect Marie-Gabriel Veugny, commissioned by Louis-Napoléon Bonaparte, designed the Cité Napoléon, constructed between 1849 and 1851 at 58, rue de Rochechouart in the 9th arrondissement of Paris. Considered the first workers’ housing estate in Paris, it was inspired by Charles Fourier’s concept of the phalanstère. The complex, arranged around a central garden with a fountain, comprised four buildings housing 400 families in 86 dwellings.

The Cité Napoléon, renamed Philanthropic city in 1884, was built in Lille between 1859 and 1862 by the Bureau de bienfaisance to accommodate 1,000 residents. Designed by architect Émile Vandenbergh, the complex consisted of six building wings separated by 16-metre-wide courtyards and connected by bridges containing shared services, with an emphasis on space, air, and light.

=== The first law concerning workers’ housing ===
On 13 April 1850, the first French law concerning workers’ housing, focused on the sanitation and prohibition of unhealthy dwellings, was enacted. Proposed by Viscount Anatole de Melun, a royalist deputy from Nord, it defined housing as unhealthy when its conditions endangered the life or health of inhabitants and granted municipal councils the authority to determine the work required to improve such housing. At the same time, the physician Louis René Villermé argued that the issue of workers’ housing was insoluble. Following his 1840 survey Tableau de l’état physique et moral des ouvriers employés dans les manufactures de coton, de laine et de soie (“Survey of the Physical and Moral Condition of Workers Employed in Cotton, Wool, and Silk Factories”), he stated before the Academy of Moral and Political Sciences that a large working-class population would inevitably include poorly housed individuals, as the lowest-paid workers would always be constrained to live in inadequate and unhealthy dwellings.

Until the 1950s, unhealthy housing was commonly described through a recurring portrayal: the worker spending time in the street or tavern, the wife remaining in a deteriorated home exposed to illness such as tuberculosis, and children playing outside in unsafe conditions.

In contrast to those, such as Villermé, who considered the housing problem unsolvable, others believed solutions were possible. Among them were philanthropists and philanthropic associations seeking to improve conditions for the working class. In London, the Society for Improving the Condition of the Working Class was founded in 1844, with a program to create workers’ housing financed by nobles and bourgeois who advanced funds expecting a 5% return. Workers repaid these investments through rent. Similar initiatives soon appeared in France, supported by liberals, manufacturers, and industrialists favoring free trade, while conservatives generally supported protectionism. Members of the upper classes who promoted such projects aimed both to improve workers’ living conditions and to encourage morality while countering socialist movements.

=== Precursors ===
==== Familistère of Guise ====
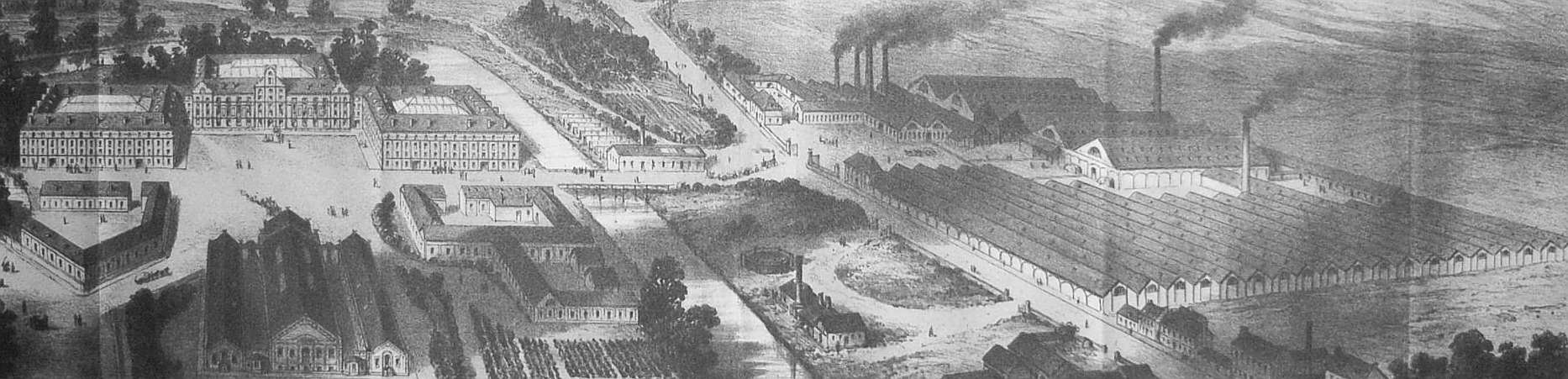
The Familistère of Guise.

In 1846, industrialist Jean-Baptiste Godin established a company in Guise producing heating and cooking appliances, notably the cast-iron “Godin stoves” that he had invented. Their success allowed him to build considerable wealth in a growing market. Having previously worked as a laborer, Godin retained strong memories of the poor living and working conditions of industrial workers, which he had observed during a Tour de France undertaken with a fellow craftsman between 1835 and 1837. Motivated to improve the lives of his employees and address working-class poverty, he drew inspiration from the ideas of Charles Fourier and became involved with the Sociétaire School. In 1854, he invested a third of his fortune in an attempt to establish a phalansterian colony in Texas under Victor Considerant, but the project failed. This experience led him to pursue the implementation of his social ideas gradually and pragmatically.

The “Familistère” was the name given by Jean-Baptiste Godin to the housing complexes he built for his workers and their families between 1858 and 1883, comprising a total of 500 dwellings. Inspired by Charles Fourier’s phalanstery, the Familistère of Guise in the Aisne department became a significant example in the economic and social history of the 19th and 20th centuries.

==== Workers’ Estates of Le Creusot ====
From 1836, Le Creusot developed as a company town centered on the ferrous industry of Schneider & Cie. For over a century, the Schneider family exercised a paternalistic influence over many aspects of local life. The steelworks employed at least one member of nearly every family, and the company established schools, a dispensary, a hospital, and housing for both workers and engineers. These initiatives contributed to improving living conditions for the population, many of whom had migrated from rural areas with previous experience of difficult working conditions.

The “Cité des Pompiers,” built in 1860, was the first housing estate constructed by Schneider & Cie. It consisted of twelve single-story houses, each divided into two dwellings with separate access. In 1865, the company built the Cité de la Villedieu, comprising 80 houses, which was presented at the 1867 Universal Exhibition. The Cité Saint-Eugène, built in 1875, was similarly exhibited at the 1878 Universal Exhibition.

==== Mulhouse model ====
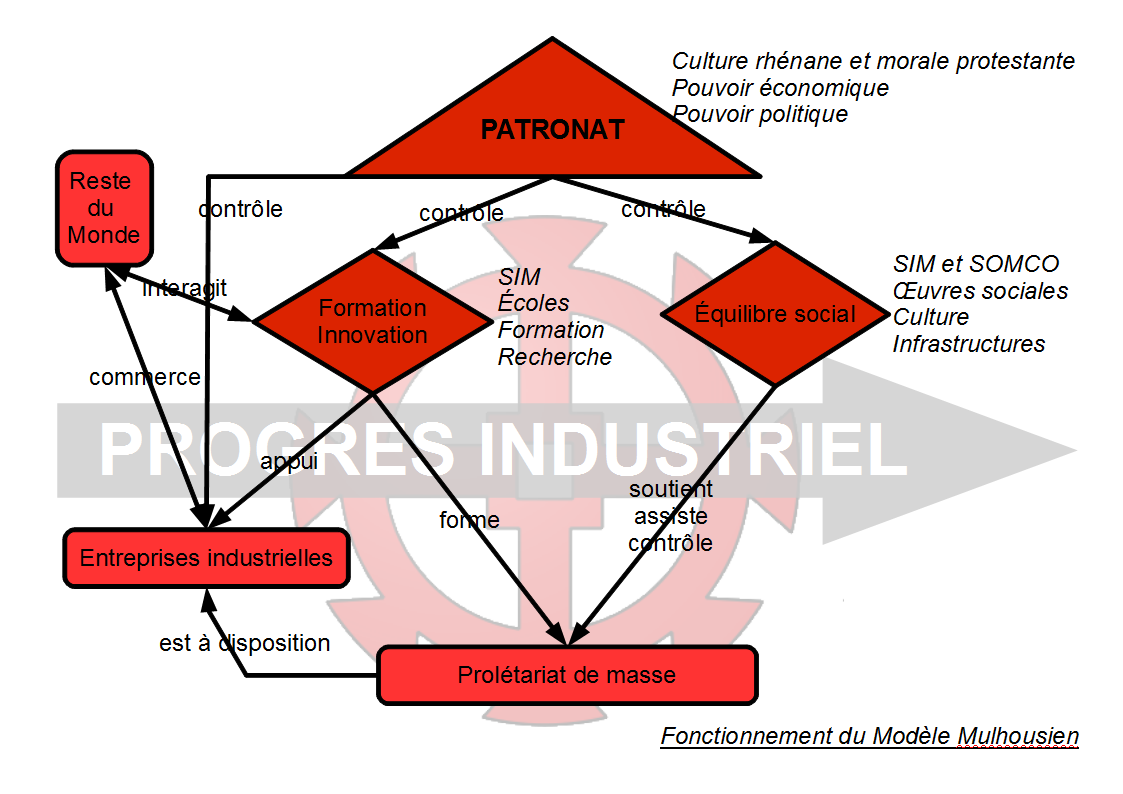
The Mulhouse model.

In the 19th century, until the German annexation of 1870, the burgomasters and mayors of Mulhouse were Protestants, often linked to the industrial elite. The Mulhouse model was structured around three elements: a paternalistic Protestant industrial class, an emphasis on innovation and technical training, and efforts to maintain social balance. Two key philanthropic associations were founded to support this model: the Société industrielle de Mulhouse (SIM) in 1826 and the Société mulhousienne de cités ouvrières (SOMCO) in 1853, initiated by industrialist and mayor Jean Dollfus, engineer Émile Muller, and school inspector Achille Penot. Their goal was to stabilize the working-class population. Between 1862 and 1897, 1,243 workers’ houses were built in Mulhouse. These single-family homes, each with a private entrance and garden, were payable in monthly installments. Investors received annual returns of 4%, but within about fifteen years the houses typically became the property of the workers. This initiative became one of the earliest and most influential examples of workers’ housing in France.

The model developed in Mulhouse was subsequently adopted elsewhere, notably with the construction of the Villa Mulhouse in Auteuil.

==== Jouffroy-Renault city, Clichy ====
The Cité Jouffroy-Renault, built in 1865 at the end of the Second Empire, was the first major social housing project in Clichy. It was established by Madame Thénard, widow of the younger brother of chemist Louis Jacques Thénard, who had been ennobled as a baron of the Empire by Napoleon I.

The Cité Jouffroy-Renault consisted of 76 identical pavilions, each with one story, an attic, and a small garden. The dwellings were rented with the option of purchase, payable over fifteen years in monthly installments, reflecting 19th-century philanthropic approaches to home ownership. Madame Thénard received a gold medal at the 1867 Universal Exhibition in recognition of this initiative.

==== Menier city, Noisiel ====
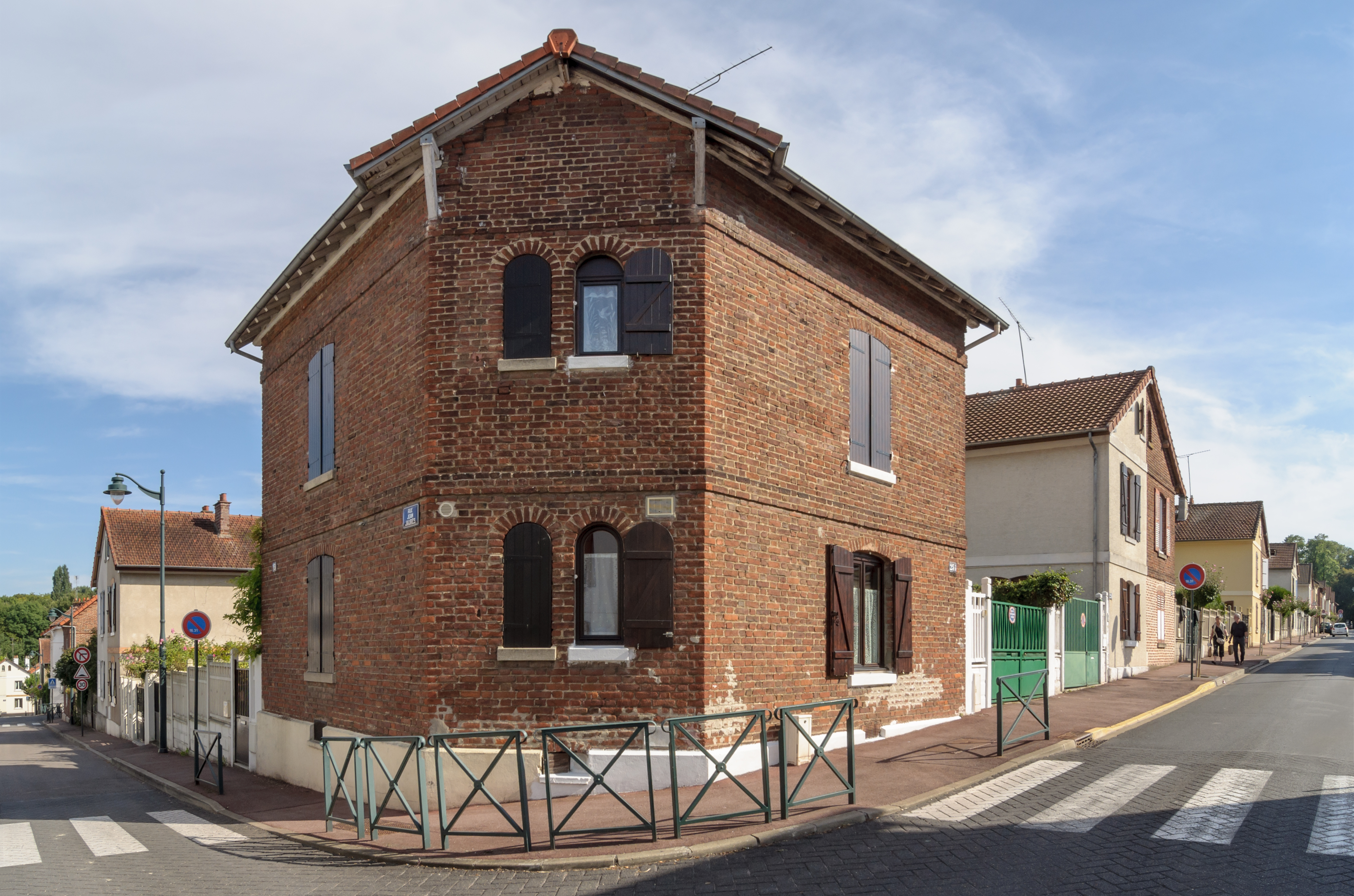
Pavilions in the Menier workers' town in Noisiel.

After becoming mayor of Noisiel in 1871 and acquiring extensive landholdings, Émile-Justin Menier initiated in 1874 the construction of 66 houses to accommodate workers of the Menier chocolate factory, together with a school complex. The Menier family drew inspiration from housing estate models in England as well as from the example of Mulhouse. Each pavilion along the street contained two independent dwellings of 64 m², composed of two bedrooms, a kitchen, and a living room on the ground floor, two additional bedrooms upstairs, and an adjoining 300 m² garden intended for vegetable cultivation. Running water was not supplied inside the houses, but fountains were installed in the streets every 45 meters. Pavilions located in the middle of lots contained four dwellings and as many gardens. Corner houses, larger and better equipped, were reserved for senior employees and engineers, and included washrooms. The dwellings were rented exclusively to personnel of the factory, without the possibility of ownership, and had to be vacated when employment ended. Rent corresponded to the equivalent of two to six days of wages, depending on rank. Until 1911, 85 additional houses were constructed, bringing the total to 311 dwellings covering 20 hectares. The estate was awarded the title of “first French housing” at the Universal Exhibition.

==== Other housing estates ====
- Jeanne d'Arc City
- Napoleon City
- Michelin City
- Doré City
- Kroumirs City
- Château ouvrier

== Birth of low-cost housing ==
=== Low-cost dwellings ===
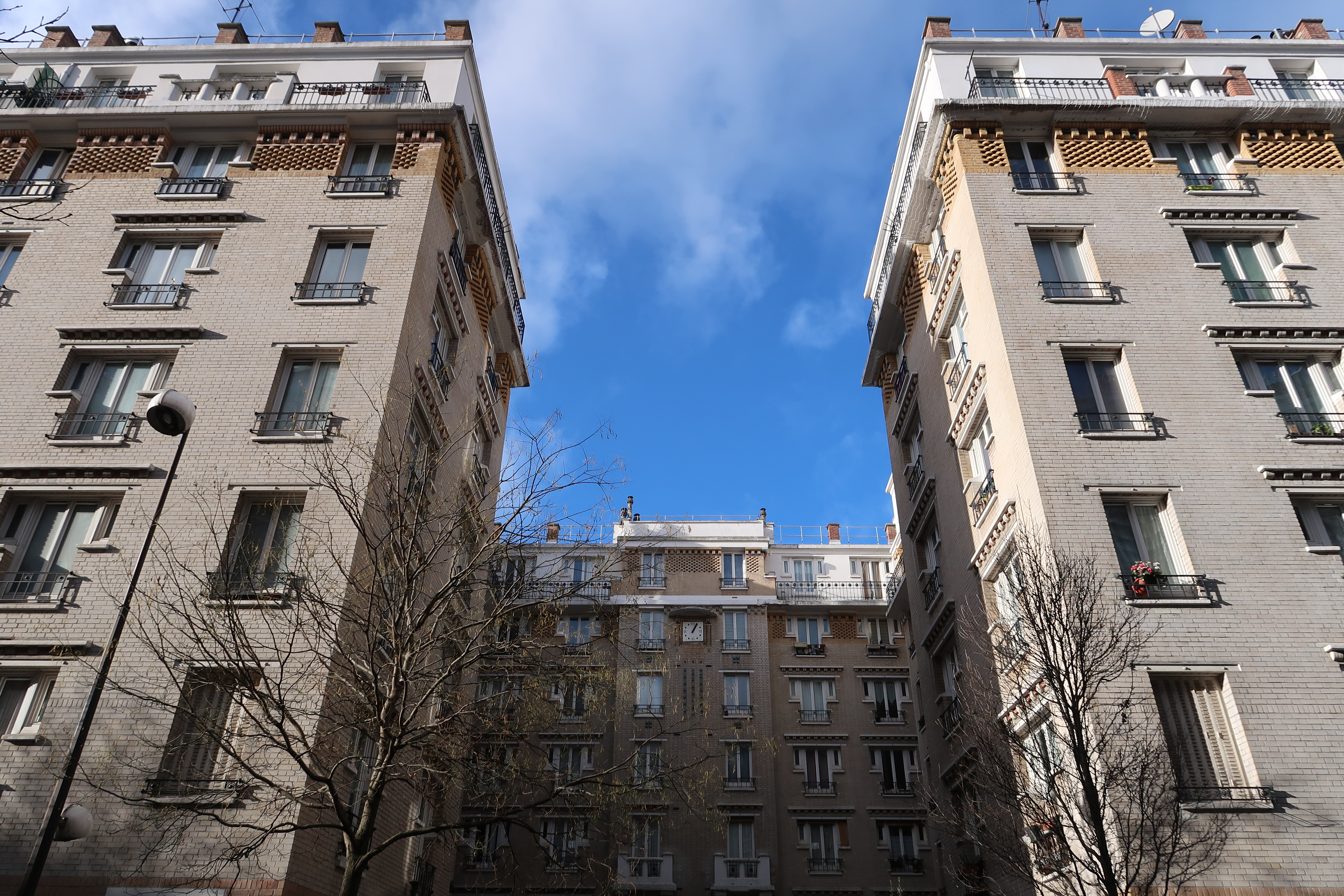
HBM on Rue des Quatre-Frères-Peignot in Paris.

The “low-cost dwellings” (habitations à bon marché, HBM) originated with the creation of the Société française des habitations bon marché (SFHBM), a private philanthropic society founded during the 1889 Paris World’s Fair. The society brought together initiatives that had developed through employers’ social programs in workers’ housing estates, such as those in Mulhouse, Le Creusot, Noisiel, and Roubaix. The term habitation à bon marché (HBM) remained in use until 1949, when it was replaced by habitation à loyer modéré (HLM, “moderate-rent housing”). The World’s Fairs of 1867 and 1889 served as important showcases for these initiatives: the 1867 exposition included a section on workers’ dwellings, while the 1889 exposition presented a full-scale reconstruction of workers’ houses on the Esplanade des Invalides, along with various plans and models. Reformers involved in these initiatives included employers attentive to workers’ living conditions, as well as philanthropists and hygienists, many of whom had long been associated with Frédéric Le Play, commissioner of the 1867 exposition and founder of the Société d’économie sociale in 1856.

The model of the workers’ dwelling presented at the time emphasized the single-family house, which was preferred over collective apartment buildings. Where shared spaces existed, they were designed to maintain family independence. This principle was illustrated by the debates surrounding the Napoleon Estate, whose layout used galleries and staircases to preserve separation between families. However, the estate soon came to be regarded as an unsuccessful example. Villermé described these dwellings as “healthy,” “convenient,” and “inexpensive,” while also noting the negative influence that could arise in “large barracks, where the bad constantly exert an unfortunate influence on the good.” As a result, the single-family house became the central model of workers’ housing reform. This approach was particularly favored at Le Creusot from 1865 until the early 20th century.

Within workers’ housing, the single multipurpose room was considered insufficient. Housing projects therefore introduced a second space, typically serving as a kitchen or dining room. The presence of two rooms was regarded as a relative improvement in comfort and as the maximum standard attainable for a working-class household at the time. This model gradually became the norm in workers’ housing plans.

One of the earliest garden city projects in France was La Ruche, located in the La Plaine Saint-Denis district (62–64 rue du Landy) and designed by architect Georges Guyon. In 1890, the Société des Habitations Économiques de Saint-Denis organized a competition for a group of social housing units in the area. Built between 1891 and 1893, La Ruche consisted of 67 units arranged between courtyard and garden. It was the first low-cost housing (HBM) project implemented under the Siegfried Law, which established public financing for social housing.

=== First laws ===
The Société française des habitations bon marché influenced the Law of November 30, 1894, known as the Siegfried Law, named after politician Jules Siegfried, a promoter of social housing. The law encouraged private initiatives in housing construction by providing a legal framework, tax exemptions, and loan systems. It promoted the creation of HBM organizations, offered workers the possibility of homeownership, and developed the concept of collective housing with individual units. It also established the use of the livret A savings account to finance social rental housing, a system that remains in place. However, since the law imposed no obligations and funding was slow, only 18 societies were created between 1898 and 1906. Housing built by joint-stock HBM companies primarily benefited workers housed by their employers. The measure was also seen as a means of social regulation through improved living conditions. Jules Siegfried summarized its intent: “Do we want to make people happy and true conservatives; do we want to increase the guarantees of order, morality, political and social moderation? Let us create workers’ housing estates.”

The Social Museum was established through the collaboration of Jules Siegfried, Léon Say, Émile Cheysson, and Count Aldebert de Chambrun, who financed the project. Functioning as a research institute, it was nicknamed the “anteroom of the Chamber” before 1914 due to its role in preparing social and urban planning laws. At the end of the 19th and the beginning of the 20th century, it influenced the development of ideas and the dissemination of social experiments. It played a significant role in the emergence of urban planning and contributed to the drafting of the Cornudet Laws of 1919 and 1924. The Social Museum also introduced the garden city model, developed by Ebenezer Howard, into France, notably through the initiatives of Henri Sellier, mayor of Suresnes. Its members were also involved in the creation of the French Society of Urban Planners in 1911.

=== Role of local authorities and public power ===
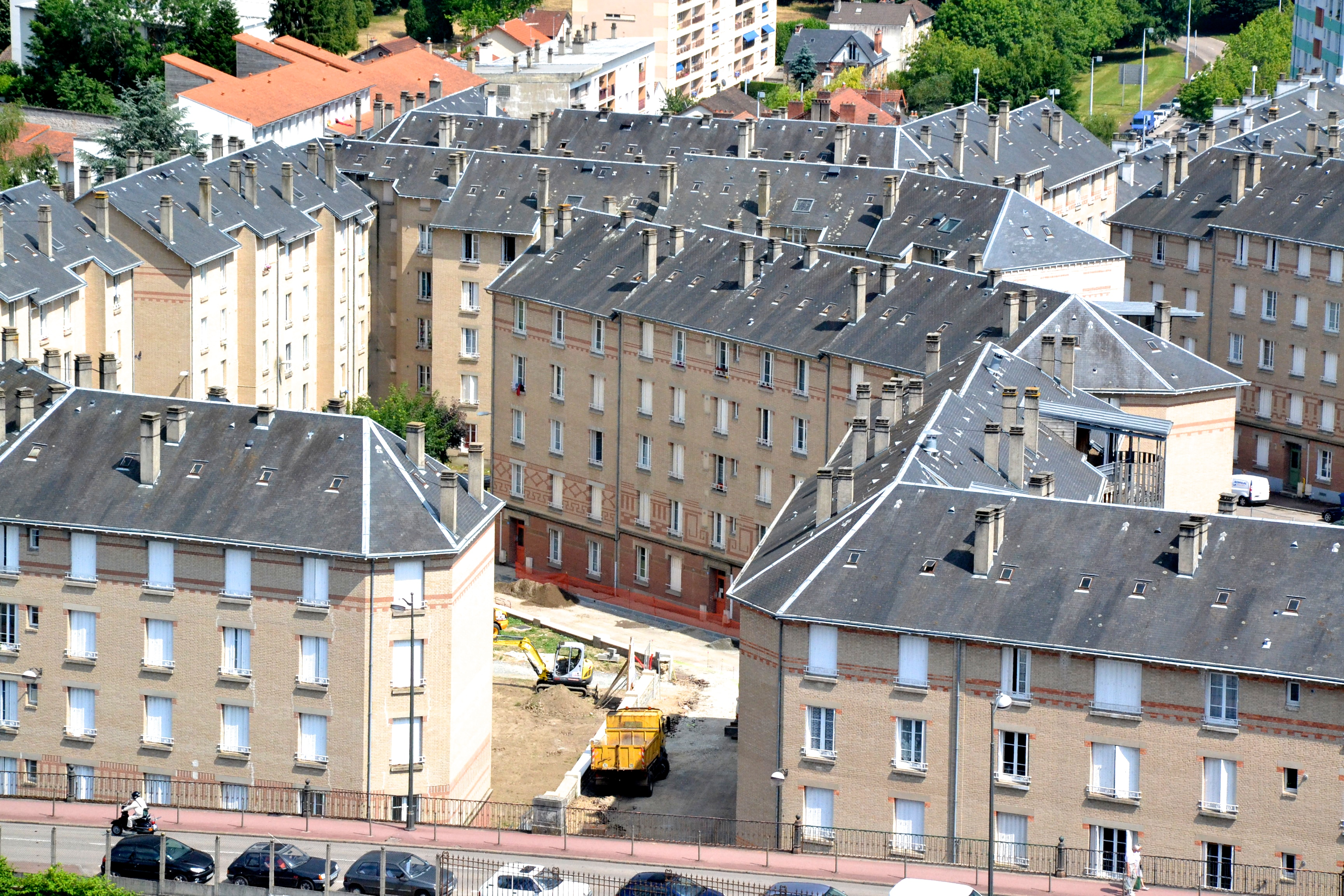
La Coutures City in Limoges, a low-income housing complex from the 1920s.

On April 12, 1906, Senator Paul Strauss introduced the law that established the HBM Cooperative Societies. This legislation expanded the scope of the 1894 Siegfried Law by broadening both the range of beneficiaries and the actions that could be undertaken. It facilitated financing by allowing municipalities to contribute to social housing projects and by authorizing the Caisse des Dépôts et Consignations to grant loans directly to HBM societies.

On December 23, 1912, Deputy Laurent Bonnevay introduced the law that authorized local authorities to create low-cost housing offices (offices d’habitations à bon marché, HBM). The law also set maximum rent levels based on the number of rooms, with a minimum surface area of 9 m² per room.

On July 13, 1928, the Loucheur Law, named after the Minister of Labor and Social Welfare, introduced the first direct financial commitment of the French State to social housing. The law established State intervention to promote popular housing, whereas previous initiatives had been private or municipal since the Bonnevay Law. It expanded the role of the Caisse des Dépôts, which had been responsible for financing social housing since 1905. The law allowed individuals to borrow at reduced rates to acquire land and build housing, with construction supervised by State-appointed architects. It also provided for the financing of 200,000 low-cost housing units (HBM) and 60,000 medium-rent housing units.

== Era of builders ==
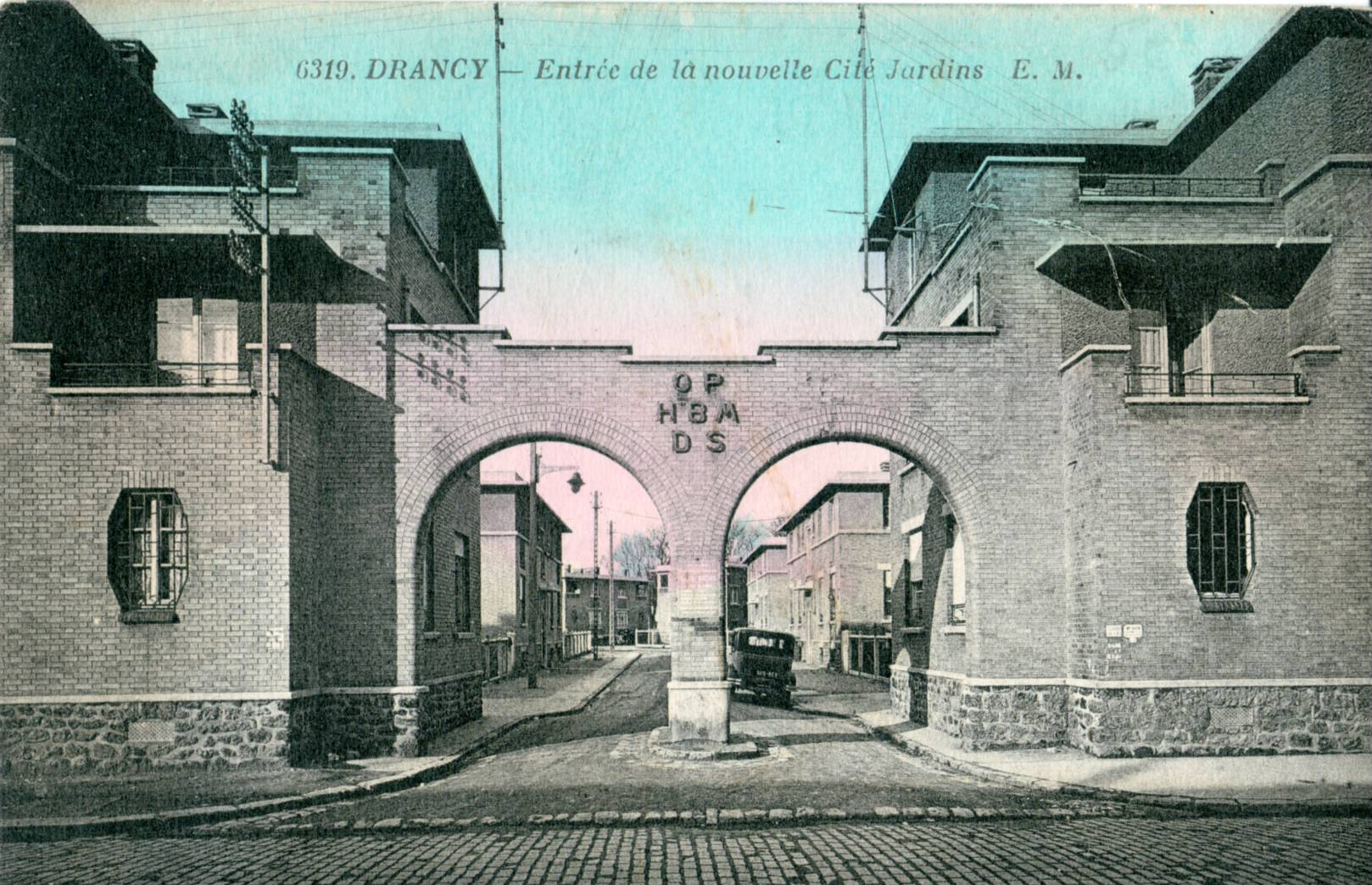
The Drancy-I group of the Seine HBMs.

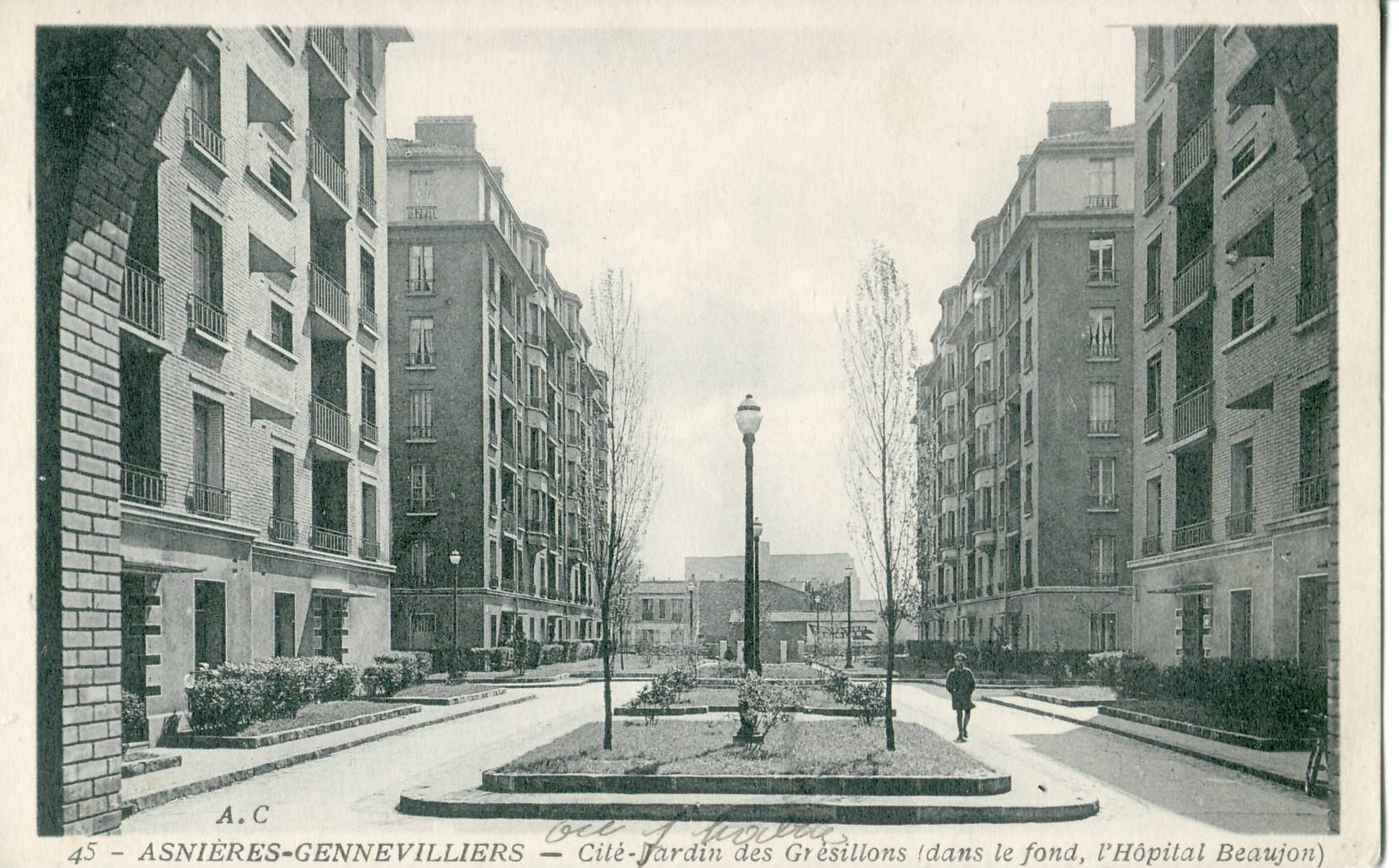
The Grésillons garden city in Asnières-sur-Seine, built by HBM de la Seine.

At the beginning of the 20th century in Paris, several private foundations initiated housing projects. The “Workers’ Housing Group” foundation, financed by philanthropist Amicie Lebaudy, sponsored housing on rue Jeanne-d’Arc, followed in 1904 by the Rothschild Foundation. This movement culminated in 1914 with the construction of numerous red-brick buildings, characteristic of the areas surrounding the boulevards des Maréchaux.

After the First World War, workers’ housing programs significantly reshaped cities such as Berlin and Vienna. In France, however, rent controls limited construction and maintenance, contributing to the deterioration of existing buildings. Housing activity remained largely confined to individual pavilions, often managed by speculative developers and constrained by the limited means of buyers. The suburban expansion of the 1920s led to the scandal of subdivisions, involving the sale of undeveloped plots.

From 1921 to 1949, the HBM office of the Seine implemented a program of garden city construction in municipalities including Arcueil, Asnières-sur-Seine, Châtenay-Malabry (La Butte Rouge), Drancy, Gennevilliers, Le Plessis-Robinson, and Stains. Many of these developments remain in existence and have been renovated. In 2011, it was estimated that 120,000 social housing units built before the Second World War were still standing.

Following Abbé Pierre’s appeal on 1 February 1954, the State, through public (OP) and private (SA) HLM bodies, significantly increased housing construction, particularly in the form of large estates. Several million housing units were built rapidly, offering higher standards of comfort than much of the existing housing stock at the time, especially regarding sanitary facilities. These constructions nevertheless often lacked adequate thermal and sound insulation, and many estates were located on city outskirts with limited transport and commercial infrastructure. In 1973, the circular on “urbanization forms known as ‘large estates’ and the fight against social segregation through housing,” issued by Olivier Guichard, Minister of Regional Development, Public Works, Housing, and Tourism, marked the end of the large housing estate policy.

From the mid-1970s, the number of social housing constructions declined. In 1975, the White Paper Proposals for Housing, published by the National Union of HLM Organizations (UNFOHLM), reported on the housing shortage and called for improved housing quality for all.

== Latest laws ==
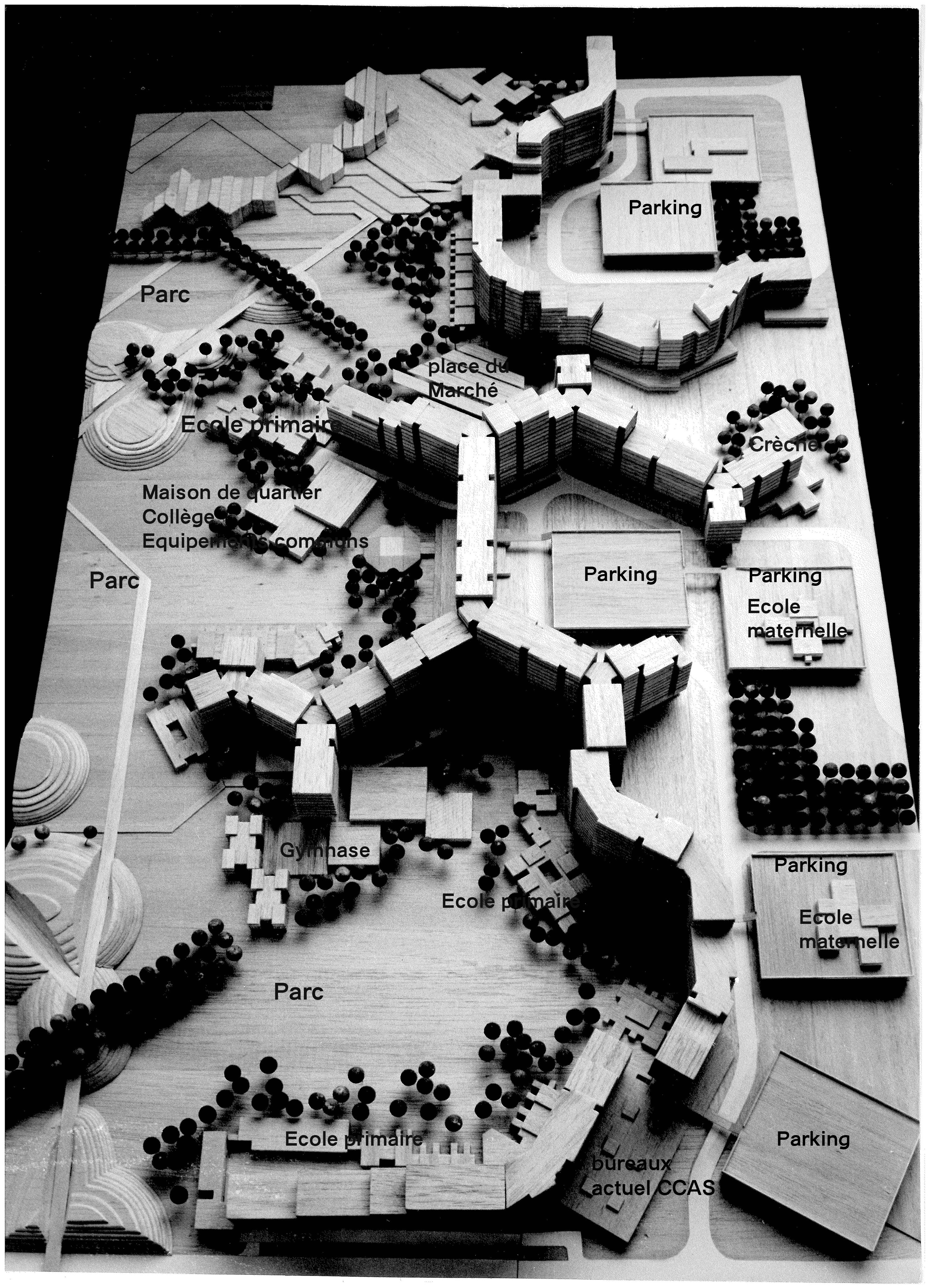
Wooden model of the Arlequin gallery, La Villeneuve, Grenoble.

Following the Barre Commission’s report, the law of January 3, 1977, introduced personalized housing assistance (APL) to support access to adequate housing. It marked a shift away from large housing estate construction toward individual pavilions and smaller-scale housing, which by 1977 accounted for more than half of all new housing.

In October 1981, the Commission for the Social Development of Neighborhoods was created during the Social Housing Conference, organized by the Caisse des Dépôts et Consignations, the Planning Commission, and UNFOHLM.

On June 22, 1982, the Quilliot Law, introduced by Minister Roger Quilliot, recognized housing as a fundamental right and regulated the relationship between landlords and tenants by placing it alongside property rights.

On May 31, 1990, the Besson Law, introduced by Minister Louis Besson, established measures to facilitate access to housing for disadvantaged populations.

On July 13, 1991, the Urban Orientation Law (LOV) emphasized the importance of housing diversity and local housing policies. Article 3 declared: “The construction of social housing is of national interest.”

On July 29, 1998, the Orientation Law on the Fight against Exclusion, which also created Universal Health Coverage (CMU), introduced measures to increase transparency in the allocation of housing.

On December 13, 2000, the Solidarity and Urban Renewal Law (SRU) redefined French urban planning and housing legislation. Its most significant provision, Article 55, required municipalities of at least 1,500 inhabitants in Île-de-France and 3,500 inhabitants elsewhere, within an agglomeration of more than 50,000 inhabitants including at least one commune of over 15,000 inhabitants, to ensure that at least 20% of their housing stock consisted of social housing. The law also reaffirmed the role of HLM organizations in promoting homeownership.

On July 2, 2003, the Urban Planning and Housing Law, introduced by Minister Gilles de Robien, revised the SRU law and created a tax system favorable to investors.

On August 1, 2003, the Orientation and Programming Law for the City and Urban Renewal, introduced by Minister Jean-Louis Borloo, defined the role of the State in sensitive urban areas.

On July 13, 2006, the law on the National Commitment for Housing aimed to increase the housing supply, particularly social housing, by encouraging construction and mobilizing private housing stock.

On March 5, 2007, the Law Establishing the Enforceable Right to Housing and Containing Various Measures in Favor of Social Cohesion was adopted.

On March 25, 2009, the Law on Mobilization for Housing and the Fight against Exclusion was adopted, containing 124 articles, many of which concerned social housing.

Promulgated on March 24, 2014, the Law for Access to Housing and Renovated Urban Planning (ALUR), introduced by Minister Cécile Duflot, revised rental regulations.

== See also ==
- Company town
- Social housing in France

== Bibliography ==
- Enquête sur la situation des logements d'ouvriers à Lille [Survey on the housing situation of workers in Lille] (in French). Lille: Imprimerie catholique. 1896. Archived from the original on April 30, 2019.
- Bonnevay, Laurent (1896). Les ouvrières lyonnaises travaillant à domicile. Misères et remèdes [Women workers in Lyon working from home. Misery and remedies] (in French). Montbrison: imprimerie Eleuthère Brassart.
- Bonnevay, Laurent (1912). Les habitations à bon marché [Affordable housing] (in French). Paris: H. Dunod et E. Pinot éditeurs.
- Bourdieu, Pierre; Christin, Rosine (1990). "La construction du marché : le champ administratif et la production de la « politique du logement »" [Market construction: the administrative field and the production of “housing policy”]. Actes de la recherche en sciences sociales (in French). 81 (81–82): 65–85. doi:10.3406/arss.1990.2927.
- Cacheux, Émile (1891). État des habitations ouvrières à la fin du XIXe siècle ; étude suivie du Compte rendu des documents relatifs aux petits logements qui ont figuré à l'Exposition universelle de 1889 [State of workers' housing at the end of the 19th century; study followed by a report on documents relating to small dwellings that appeared at the 1889 World's Fair.] (in French). Paris: Baudry.
  - A book presenting all the workers' housing estates recognized as “models” in Europe in 1889.
- Driant, J.-C. (2009). Les politiques du logement en France [Housing policies in France] (in French). La documentation française. ISSN 1763-6191.
- Dumont, Marie-Jeanne (1991). Le logement social à Paris 1850-1930 : les habitations à bon marché [Social housing in Paris 1850-1930: affordable housing] (in French). Éditions Mardaga. ISBN 978-2-87009-349-8.
- Feron-Vrau, Camille-Édouard (1899). Des habitations ouvrières à Lille en 1896 [Workers' housing in Lille in 1896] (in French). Lille: L. Danel. Archived from the original on April 30, 2019.
- Fourcaut, Annie (2006). Le logement social, une histoire européenne [Social housing, a European story] (in French). Revue Histoire et sociétés.
- Guerrand, Roger-Henri (1992). Une Europe en construction : deux siècles d'habitat social en Europe [Europe under construction: two centuries of social housing in Europe] (in French). Paris: Éditions La Découverte. ISBN 978-2-7071-2131-8.
- Guerrand, Roger-Henri; Paquot, Thierry (2002). L'habitat en utopie [Housing in utopia] (in French).
- Guerrand, Roger-Henri; Viet, Vincent (1997). Sociétés anonymes d'Hlm depuis 1853 : Une certaine philosophie de l'action privée pour une mission d'intérêt général [Public limited companies for social housing since 1853: A certain philosophy of private action for a mission of general interest] (in French). Paris: Fédération nationale des sociétés coopératives d'HLM. ISBN 978-2-9511774-0-6.
- Kamoun, Patrick (1939). Le logement social à l'âge d'or de la carte postale [Social housing in the golden age of postcards]. Hlm Aujourd'hui (in French).
- Kamoun, Patrick (2007). "Historique du peuplement - Un siècle d'habitat « à bon marché »" [History of settlement - A century of “affordable” housing]. Revue Informations sociales (in French). 5 (141).
- Quilliot, Roger; Guerrand, Roger-Henri (1989). Cent ans d'habitat social : une utopie réaliste [A hundred years of social housing: a realistic utopia] (in French). Paris: Albin Michel. ISBN 2-226-03712-8.
- Stébé, Jean-Marc (2007). Le logement social en France [Social housing in France]. Que sais-je ? (in French). Paris: PUF. ISBN 978-2-13-055594-0.
- Un Siècle d'habitat social : les Chemins de la Solidarité [A Century of Social Housing: Paths to Solidarity]. Habitat et Société (in French). Union nationale des fédérations d'organismes HLM. 1997.
- Collectif. La modernité des Hlm, 90 ans d'engagement des offices pour un habitat solidaire [The modernity of social housing: 90 years of commitment by public housing authorities to inclusive housing] (in French). Éditions La Découverte pour la Fédération nationale des Ophlm et Opac.
