= Social housing in France =

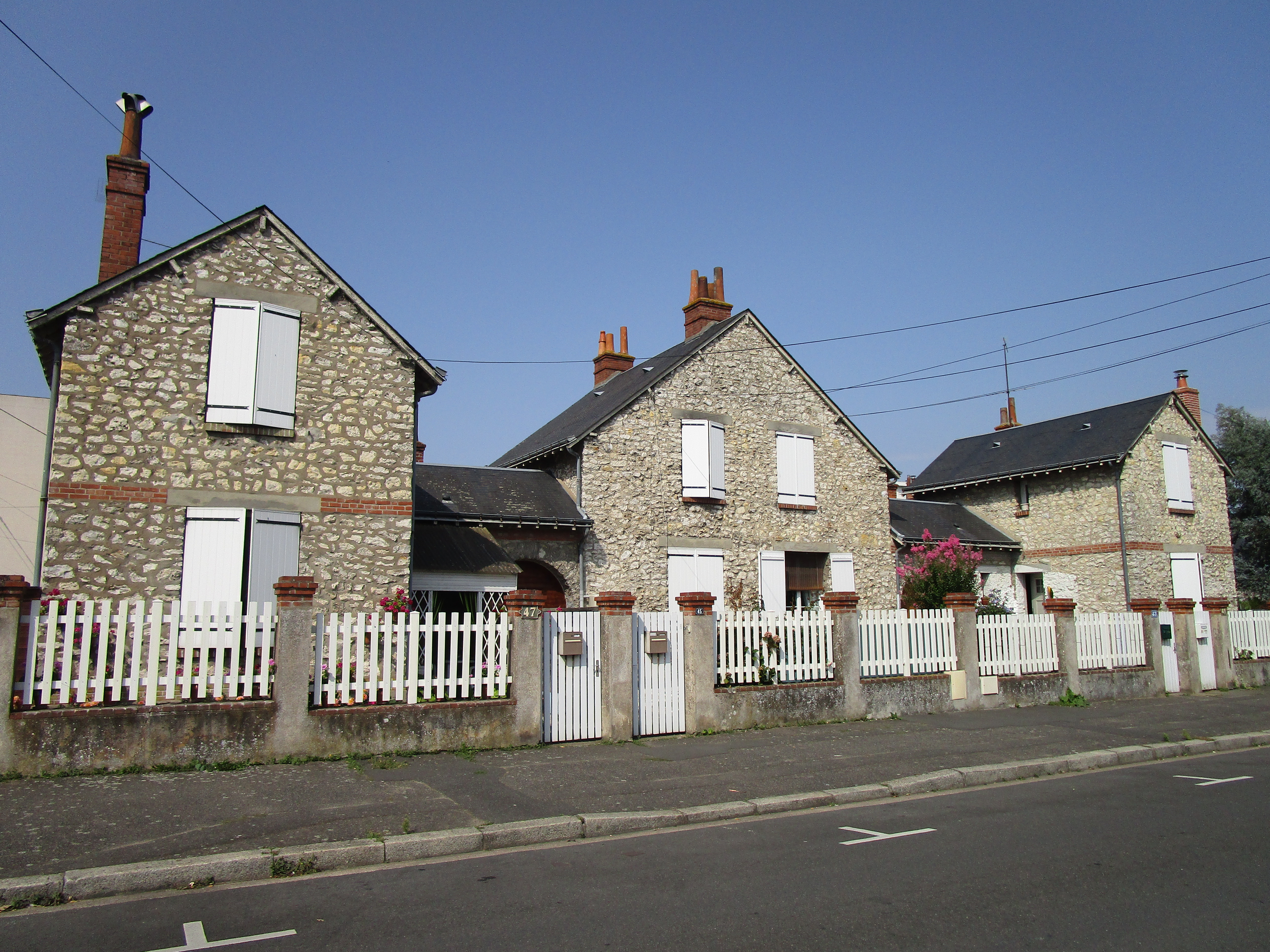
Workers' housing estate in the Giraudeau district of Tours, built in 1924.

Social housing in France is housing intended, following a public or private initiative, for people whose income does not exceed certain limits within the working and middle classes. The term encompasses the construction, occupancy, and management of this housing stock. It contributes to public housing policy and social economy policies that govern its administration. In other countries, social housing has similar objectives.

Social housing is a compromise between a precursor to “Fordism” outlined from the late 19th century to ease tensions in the labor world, the realization of a republican project to ensure greater de facto equality among citizens through legislation, and a modern project in the fields of urban planning, architecture, construction, and social engineering in the 20th century.

Social housing accounts for 17% of France’s total housing stock in 2013:.

According to a study by the Banque des Territoires in 2025, building new or renovated social housing seems impossible given the budgetary equation in France.

== History ==
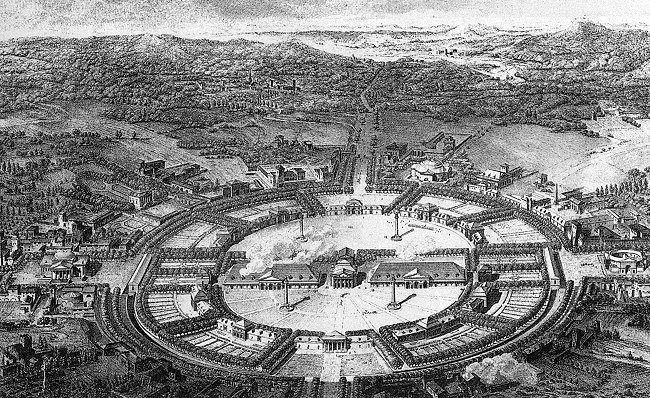
Project for the town of Chaux around the Royal Saltworks of Arc-et-Senans.

While the concern for housing low-income families is an ancient issue, found in Greco-Roman antiquity or in the 18th century with architect Claude-Nicolas Ledoux, the first French state initiative for social housing was the law of 30 November 1894, known as the Siegfried law, which created "habitation à bon marché" (HBM). This initiative was rooted in social surveys on the housing conditions of the working classes, such as Dr. Villermé’s work on the physical and moral state of workers in cotton, wool, and silk factories (1841) and Émile Cacheux’s publications on workers’ housing.

Until 1953, state-led construction remained limited, except for post-war reconstructions, garden cities enabled by Henri Sellier’s 1928 law, and decisions made during the Liberation by Raoul Dautry and Eugène Claudius-Petit. The period from 1953 to 1977 was marked by a major social housing construction movement driven by economic restructuring.

In 1977, the Barre law marked a state withdrawal from social housing construction, shifting from “brick-and-mortar” aid to personal aid. This led to management issues in the public housing stock, tarnishing the image of social housing. Over the past 30 years, numerous public interventions have shaped the transformation of social housing.

Sometimes the heat problems, especially in 1950s social housing, pose problems of convenience.

== Legislative developments ==
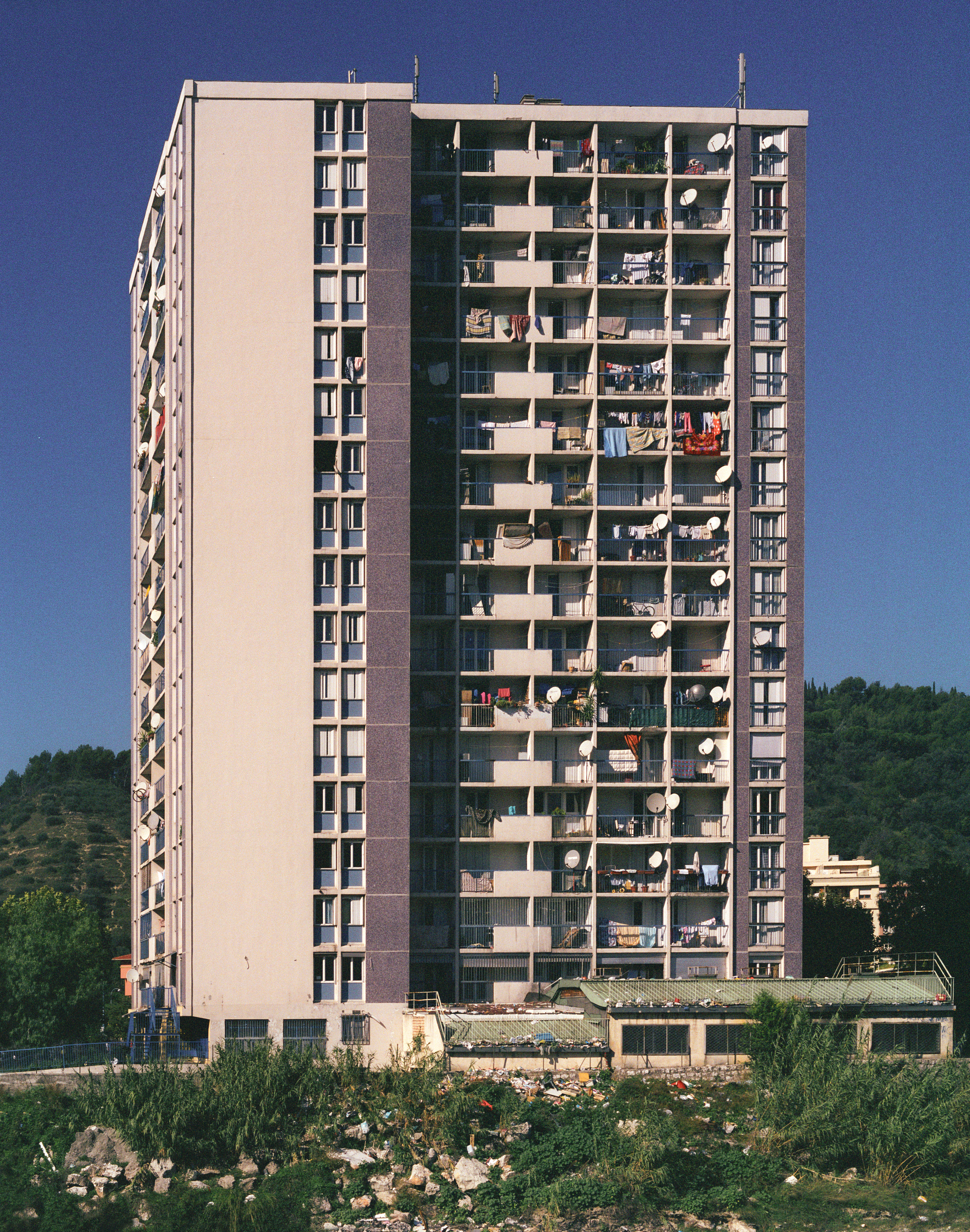
Tower in L'Ariane, Nice.

The Loi d'orientation pour la ville of 13 July 1991, known as the “anti-ghetto law,” targeted large estates and aimed to combat social and spatial segregation. Its objectives were vague: balancing housing, maintaining social housing, enabling urban and social evolution of large estates, and establishing a land policy.

In 2000, the Loi relative à la solidarité et au renouvellement urbains promoted social mixing. It applied to agglomerations with over 50,000 inhabitants and mandated a minimum of 20% social housing. Municipalities were urged to address deficits quickly. The use of the Solidarity and Urban Renewal Law (SRU) in 2000 followed a logic of social mixing. In 2003, the Urban Orientation and Programming Law for Urban Renewal was introduced, involving the demolition of dilapidated buildings in central neighborhoods and the construction of new housing. The Loi d'orientation et de programmation pour la ville et la rénovation urbaine (PNRU) called for demolishing over 250,000 housing units, with an equal number of social housing units to be rebuilt to achieve social mixing. The goal was to attract middle classes to stigmatized neighborhoods and distribute social classes more evenly spatially.

In France, of the 730 municipalities affected, 325 were non-compliant in 2008. Mayors cited high land prices and a lack of financial and technical resources. By 2010, 139,000 housing units had been demolished, with 133,000 rebuilt.

== Social mixing ==
Maurice Blanc, in his article Espace, inégalité et transaction sociale published in 2012, notes that in housing policy, social mixing remains a primary motivation for successive governments. The lack of social mixing is seen as an urban concern. Social mixing cannot be measured by a quantitative indicator of the number of social housing units.

Moreover, the percentage of social housing in a municipality does not guarantee social mixing: the 20% social housing may be concentrated in one neighborhood, leading to uneven intra-municipal distribution and low social mixing. Additionally, social housing is often associated in the public imagination with low-income populations. However, comparing HLM income ceilings to the median income of 22 522 euros in Île-de-France shows that half the population is eligible for at least an integration subsidized rental loan or a social rental loan.

Income ceilings for an HLM based on its financing type in Île-de-France.

| Number of people to be housed | Subsidized Integration Rental Loan (PLAI) | Prêt locatif à usage social (PLUS) | Prêt locatif social (PLS) | Prêt locatif intermédiaire (PLI) |
|---|---|---|---|---|
| 1 person | 12 848 € | 23 354 € | 30 360 € | 37 126 € |
| 2 people | 20 943 € | 34 904 € | 45 375 € | 55 486 € |
| 3 people (or 1 person + 1 dependent) | 27 452 € | 45 755 € | 59 482 € | 72 737 € (Paris and neighboring municipalities), 66 699 € (other municipalities) |
| 4 people (or 1 person + 2 dependents) | 30 049 € | 54 628 € | 71 016 € | 86 843 € (Paris and neighboring municipalities), 79 893 € (other municipalities) |
| 5 people (or 1 person + 3 dependents) | 35 746 € | 64 997 € | 84 496 € | 103 326 € (Paris and neighboring municipalities), 94 579 € (other municipalities) |
| 6 people (or 1 person + 4 dependents) | 40 227 € | 73 138 € | 95 079 € | 116 268 € (Paris and neighboring municipalities), 106 431 € (other municipalities) |

However, this is not always the case. Social housing rents may remain too high for the poorest groups, who may end up in substandard private-sector housing. Thus, middle classes often occupy social housing, while the poorest reside in private housing. Moreover, renovation-demolition of housing does not always lead to better social mixing, as displaced populations often relocate to similar areas.

== Objectives ==
Social housing was created to improve housing conditions for the working and middle classes. Article 140 of the Loi relative à la solidarité et au renouvellement urbains specifies that “any person or family experiencing particular difficulties” is entitled to such housing “due, in particular, to inadequate resources or living conditions.” Rent and income ceilings for tenants are set annually by decree and vary by location, type of agreement, and household composition. To keep rents low, public authorities provide indirect aid, paid not to the tenant but to the landlord, in the form of financing facilities, subsidies, tax deductions, etc. This aid comes with conditions on housing quality and rent levels.

Social housing is also a tool to address the right to housing, recognized by Law No. 2007-290 of 5 March 2007 establishing the enforceable right to housing (DALO Law). However, 70% of the French population is eligible for social housing based on income. Other housing policies, such as rent control, may be used to mitigate the adverse effects of shortages or to maintain housing stock at rent levels more affordable for most tenants.

== Statistical data ==
The importance of social housing varies by country, but France has less than most Western European countries.

Social Housing in Europe
| Country | Number of social housing units per 1,000 inhabitants (2008) |
|---|---|
| Netherlands | 147 |
| Austria | 102 |
| Denmark | 102 |
| Sweden | 95 |
| United Kingdom | 85 |
| France | 69.2 |
| Germany | 27 |
| Italy | 18 |
| Spain | 3 |

France’s social rental stock comprises 4.5 million rental units and 0.3 million hostel-type housing. Half of the social rental stock is located in Hauts-de-France, Auvergne-Rhône-Alpes, and Île-de-France. These units represent 19% of the housing stock, and 15.7% of households have moderate rent housing (HLM) as their primary residence. With 57% of French households owning their primary residence and 43% renting, 36.5% of renters in France have an HLM as their primary residence.

In 2016, 10.7 million people were social housing tenants. The average age of social housing tenants is 50, between that of private-sector tenants and owner-occupiers. The median standard of living for social housing occupants is 15,100 euros, lower than the rest of the population.

These tenants benefit from an implicit aid estimated at 227 euros by the INSEE. This implicit aid is often combined with housing assistance received by 6 million households (out of 26 million, including 11.2 million tenants), or 53% of tenants. The average amount of this aid is 210 euros per month.

=== In Hauts-de-Seine ===
The SRU Law, from 2000, mandates a 20% social housing rate per municipality; this rate increased to 25% in 2013.

In 2002, Hauts-de-Seine had 165,686 housing units. Municipalities averaged 24% social housing. However, significant disparities existed. Neuilly-sur-Seine had barely 3% social housing in its housing stock. The municipalities of Vaucresson, Ville-d'Avray, Marnes-la-Coquette, La Garenne-Colombes, Boulogne-Billancourt, Saint-Cloud, Sceaux, Bourg-la-Reine, Antony, Bois-Colombes, Asnières-sur-Seine, Levallois-Perret, Chaville, and Rueil-Malmaison had less than 13% social housing, failing to meet the SRU Law’s 20% requirement. Conversely, Châtenay-Malabry, Bagneux, Le Plessis-Robinson, Nanterre, Villeneuve-la-Garenne, and Gennevilliers had social housing rates above 38%.

In 2009, the department had 177,504 housing units, a 7% increase from 2002–2009. The municipalities not complying with the SRU Law remained the same as in 2002. However, Malakoff joined the 2002 municipalities with over 38% social housing.

In 2015, the department had 198,769 housing units, a 12% increase from 2009–2015 and a 20% increase from 2002–2015. After the SRU Law reform in 2013, the mandatory social housing rate rose from 20% to 25% per municipality. In 2015, non-compliant municipalities were: Neuilly-sur-Seine, Vaucresson, Ville-d'Avray, La Garenne-Colombes, Marnes-la-Coquette, Boulogne-Billancourt, Saint-Cloud, Bourg-la-Reine, Bois-Colombes, Levallois-Perret, Antony, Montrouge, Asnières-sur-Seine, Courbevoie, Sceaux, Garches, Sèvres, Issy-les-Moulineaux, Chaville, Vanves, Châtillon, and Rueil-Malmaison. Thus, 58% of Hauts-de-Seine municipalities had social housing rates below 25% in 2015. Leading municipalities were Malakoff, Fontenay-aux-Roses, Châtenay-Malabry, Villeneuve-la-Garenne, Nanterre, Gennevilliers, and Bagneux, with over 40% social housing.

Mayors cited high land prices and a lack of financial and technical resources. Additionally, some elected officials preferred paying penalties over building social housing, as penalties are not sufficiently dissuasive.

== Definition of social rental housing ==
In mainland France, since January 1977, a housing unit qualifies as social housing through an agreement between the social landlord and the state. This agreement primarily enables future tenants to benefit from the APL, the Personalized Housing Allowance. The agreement’s text is set by decree. Beyond APL eligibility, the agreement outlines the landlord’s obligations in exchange for construction (or rehabilitation) benefits (see below: Financing). Compliance with rent and income ceilings are the two main obligations of the social landlord. Article 441 and subsequent articles of the Code de la construction et de l'habitation outline all obligations tied to the agreement. The agreement also grants the state a 30% reservation right on the housing units involved.

There are three types of HLM defined by construction aid levels and target populations

- The PLS (Social Rental Loan) is accessible to higher-income households.
- The PLUS (Social Rental Loan) is reserved for applicants with median income ceilings.
- The PLAI (Subsidized Integration Rental Loan) is accessible to the least advantaged, with the lowest rents enabled by greater construction aid.

== Social organizations ==
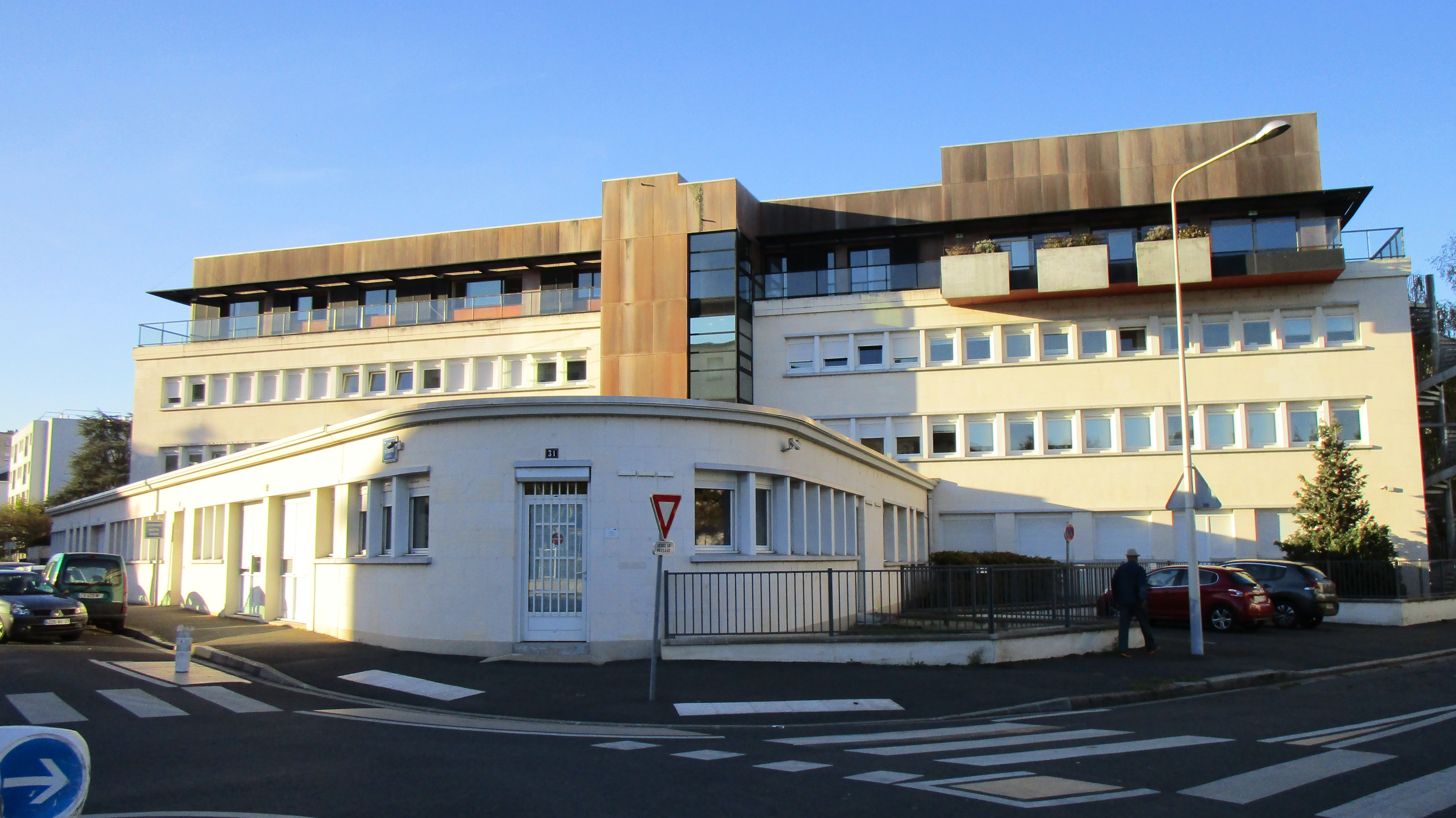
Headquarters of Tours Habitat, the social landlord of the city of Tours.

All HLM organizations belong to federations, which are grouped under the Union sociale pour l'habitat (USH). The main social organizations are public housing offices (OPH) and Entreprise sociale pour l'habitat (ESH). Public housing offices (OPH) are local public establishments with industrial and commercial status (EPIC), linked to a municipality, an Établissement public de coopération intercommunale, or a department. They are managed by a board of directors, chaired by an elected official from the linked authority, and a general director.

The largest OPH is the Paris OPH, with nearly 120,000 housing units; the smallest have a few hundred units. Social enterprises for housing (ESH) are private non-profit companies whose capital may be held by private or public individuals or entities. They must have a majority (or reference) shareholder. Tenants are also shareholders to participate in governance (board of directors or supervisory board).

The reference shareholders of ESHs are mainly Action Logement collectors (formerly 1% housing). Some insurers, banks, or industrial companies also hold capital. For example, Caisse d'Épargne is the reference shareholder of GCE Habitat and Erilia, and AXA is the majority shareholder of the 1001 Vies Habitat Group. The largest ESH is the Groupe 3F, with nearly 200,000 housing units, with Solendi as the reference shareholder. Other social landlords may include mixed economy companies, foundations, or cooperative societies. CDC Habitat, a subsidiary of the Caisse des dépôts et consignations (CDC), is also a major French landlord.

The Agence nationale de contrôle du logement social (ANCOLS) is responsible for monitoring and evaluating the actions of all social housing operators.

== Financing ==
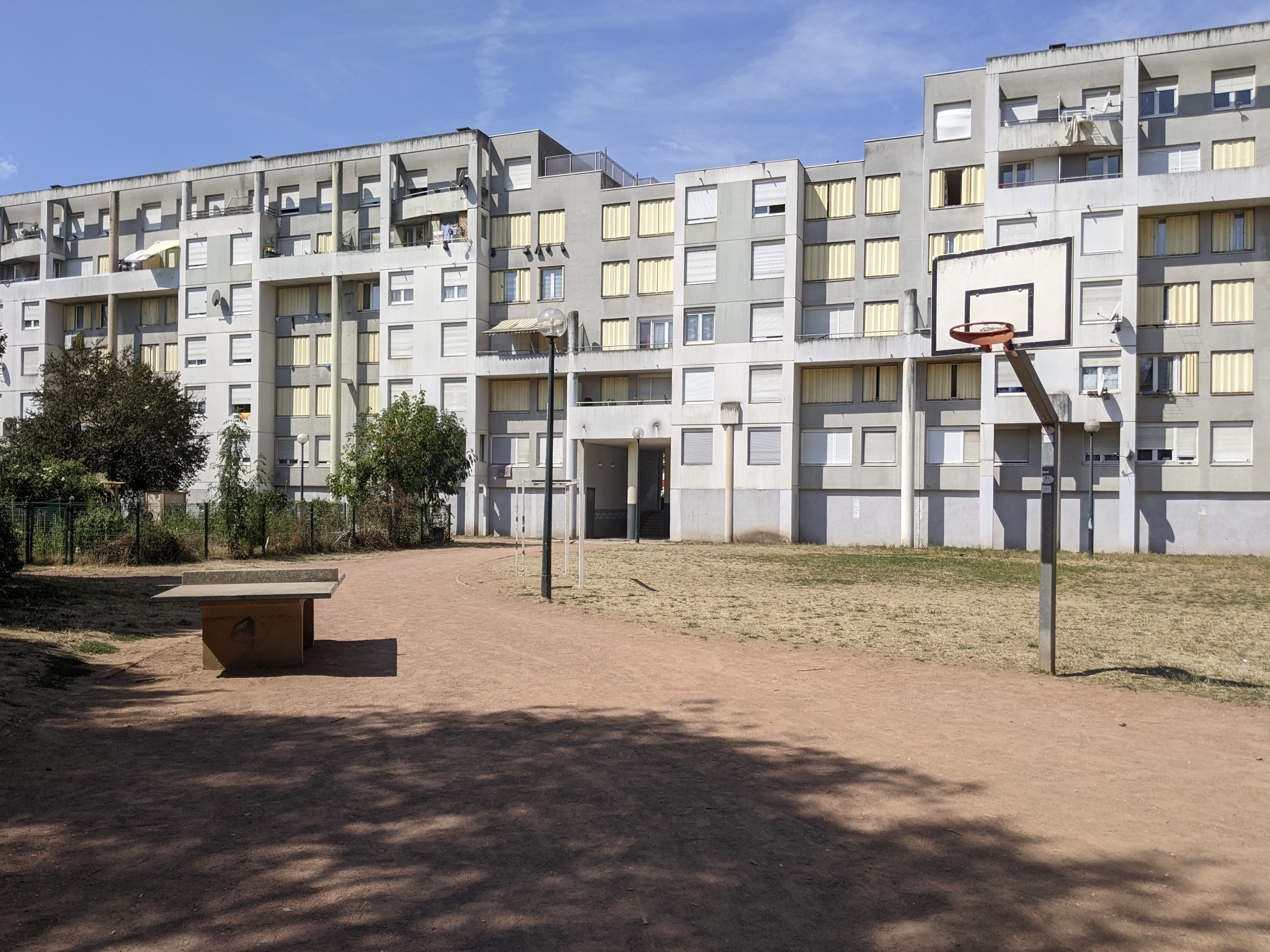
La Duchère in Lyon.

In France, social housing is financed by several actors: The state, in three main forms, briefly summarized below:

- A subsidy based on the project’s social purpose, commonly called “brick-and-mortar aid”;
- Tax exemptions, primarily the exemption from the property tax on built properties (TFPB)—local authorities (recipients of this tax) are partially compensated by a compensation fund—and the exemption from corporate tax;
- The payment of the personalized housing assistance (APL). Calculated based on tenants’ income and rent, this aid is paid directly by the Family Allowance Offices (CAF) to the landlord.

Local authorities can also contribute to housing projects:

- Providing subsidies additional to those of the state;
- Offering land concessions at below-market prices;
- Implementing Emphyteutic leases;
- Providing direct housing subsidies to their Public Housing Office (OPH).

Action Housing (formerly 1% housing) corresponds to the Employers’ Contribution to Housing (PEEC), promoting employee housing. These funds are used for loans or subsidies, supporting both rental housing and homeownership. In exchange, collectors receive reservation rights on supported projects. In 2019, the government plans to draw 500 million euros from Action Housing’s treasury to balance its own budget.

The Caisse des dépôts et consignations is the historical funder of social housing. It provides social landlords with loans, not subsidies, at interest rates significantly below market rates due to its management of Livret A savings funds. The Caisse requires these loans to be guaranteed by local authorities or, failing that, by the Social Housing Guarantee Fund (CGLLS). In exchange for their guarantee or financial support, local authorities receive reservation rights on the housing units (up to 20%).

== Sale of social housing ==
Public policies encourage the sale of social housing to tenants or other social housing tenants. In such cases, a discount may be applied compared to market prices. Some departments (Haut-de-Seine, Essonne) have passed resolutions to reduce the departmental share of transfer taxes (notary fees) for sold social housing units. Buyers must commit to using the housing as their primary residence for five years and not reselling it for a profit during this period. Some municipalities, including Paris, prohibit the sale of social housing on their territory. Other countries (e.g., former Eastern Europe, such as Karl-Marx-Allee in Berlin, or the UK in the 1980s) have also experienced large-scale social housing sales.

== Urban Rehabilitation ==
On July 20, 2025, the tallest public housing tower in France, the Kennedy Tower, was demolished by detonation in Loos, as part of the urban rehabilitation.

== See also ==
- Public housing in France
- Garden city movement
- Low-cost housing
- History of social housing in France
