= Public housing in France =

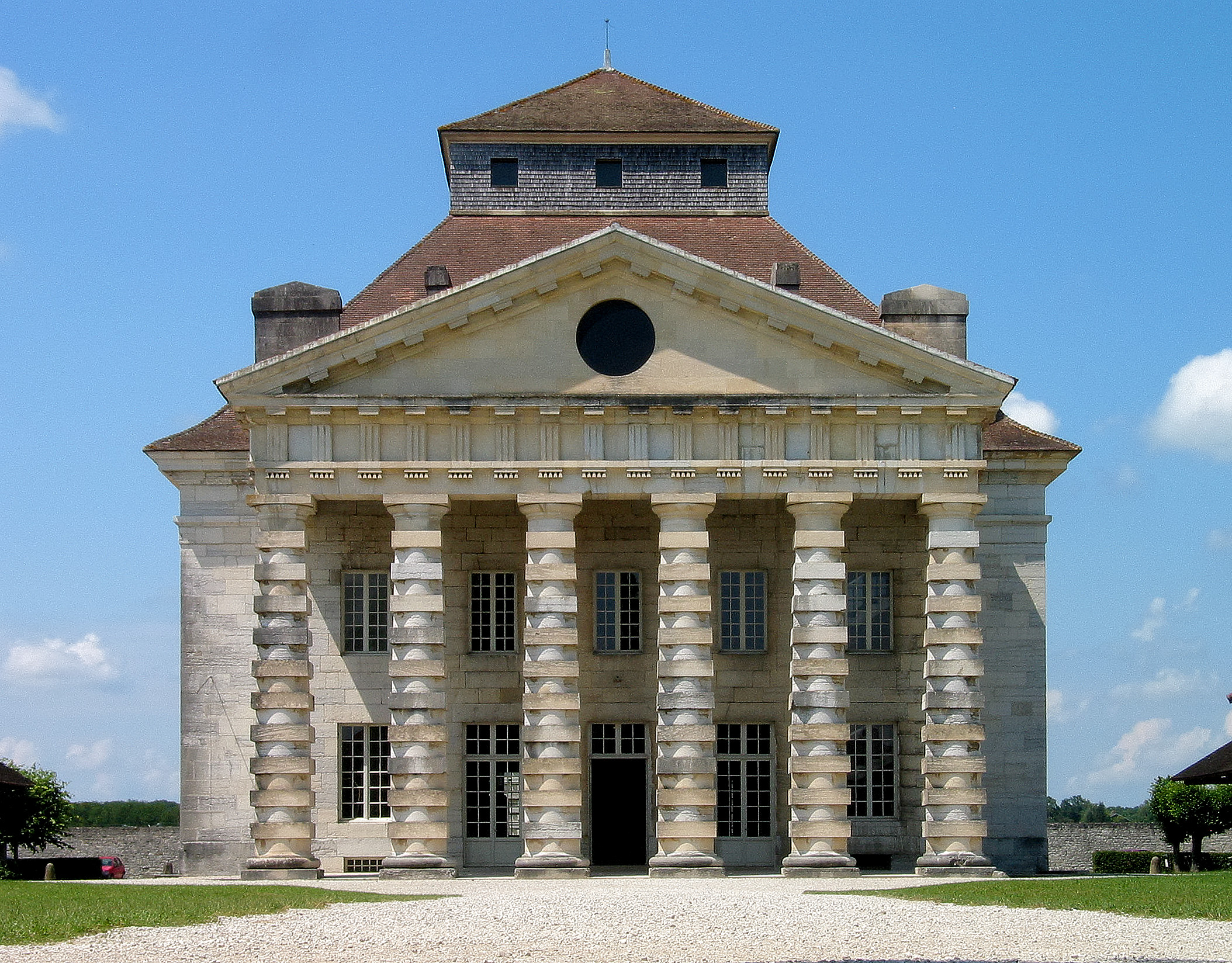
The main facade of the 18th-century Royal Saltworks at Arc-et-Senans, which provided workers' housing

Public housing in France (French: logement social, also called Habitations à loyer modéré, or HLM) is a central, local or social program designed to provide subsidized assistance for low-income and poor people.

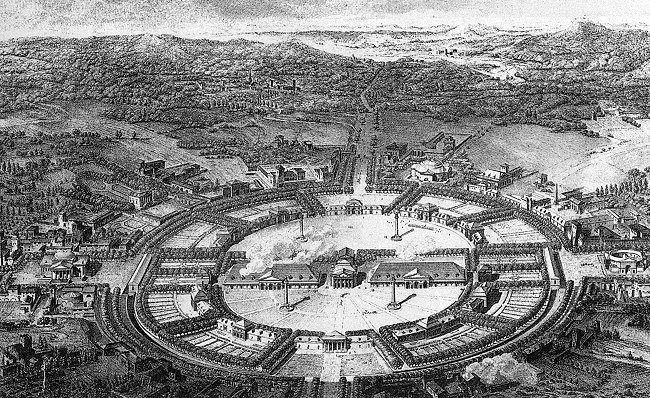
Ledoux’s 1775 plan for the town of Chaux around the Arc-et-Senans saltworks.

== History ==
France has a long tradition of social and state intervention in the provision of housing. In 1774, Louis XV, shortly before his death, commissioned architect Claude-Nicolas Ledoux to design the Royal Saltworks of Arc-et-Senans. The Saltworks are considered one of the first examples of industrial architecture. The complex included technical facilities, workers’ housing, and gardens, functioning as an integrated site where much of the working community resided.

In the 19th century, in a context of industrialization, the cités ouvrières (company towns) appeared, inspired by the Phalanstère of Charles Fourier. These were an early form of social housing — by private initiative — in the form of workers’ housing estates and other “corons” built by industrialists to house their workforce.

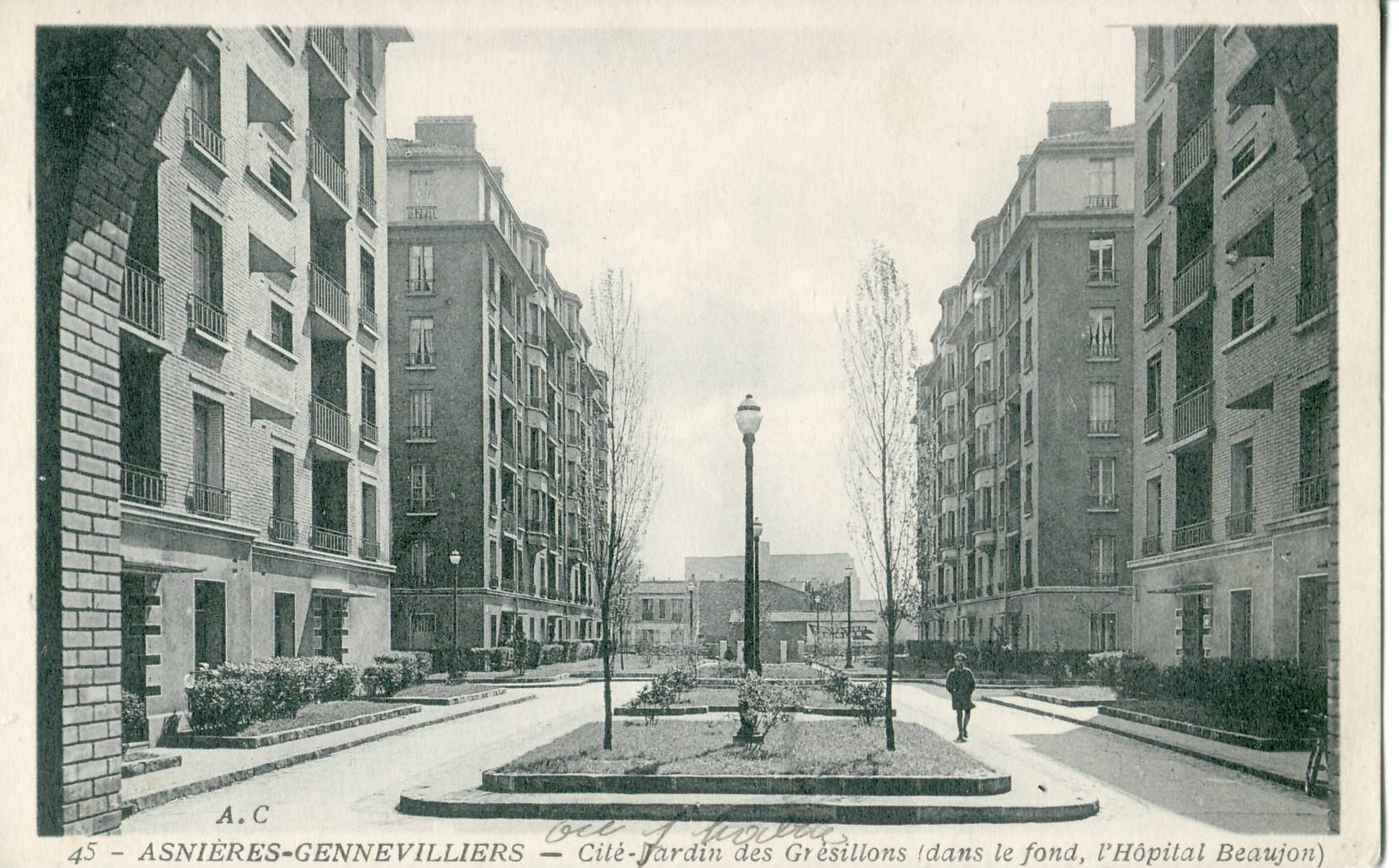
Low income housing in Asnières Gennevilliers, built by Habitations à Bon Marché de la Seine

From 1898 until 1949, these private initiatives would be governed by a legal framework, the Siegfried Law. This law offered financial support to private initiatives to encourage the construction of low-rent housing (loan facilities and tax advantages). Within that framework, the first international congress of "Low-Cost Housing" (Habitations à Bon Marché) was held, and Jules Siegfried, the deputy-mayor of Le Havre, founded the Société Française des Habitations à Bon Marché, which promoted the construction of housing for middle and working classes. In 1906, the Strauss Law strengthened the subsidies granted to private builders and managers of low-cost housing. The duration of tax benefits was extended from 5 to 12 years. The law encouraged municipalities and departments to support low-cost housing societies through financial aid. This provided further impetus to private construction of low cost housing.

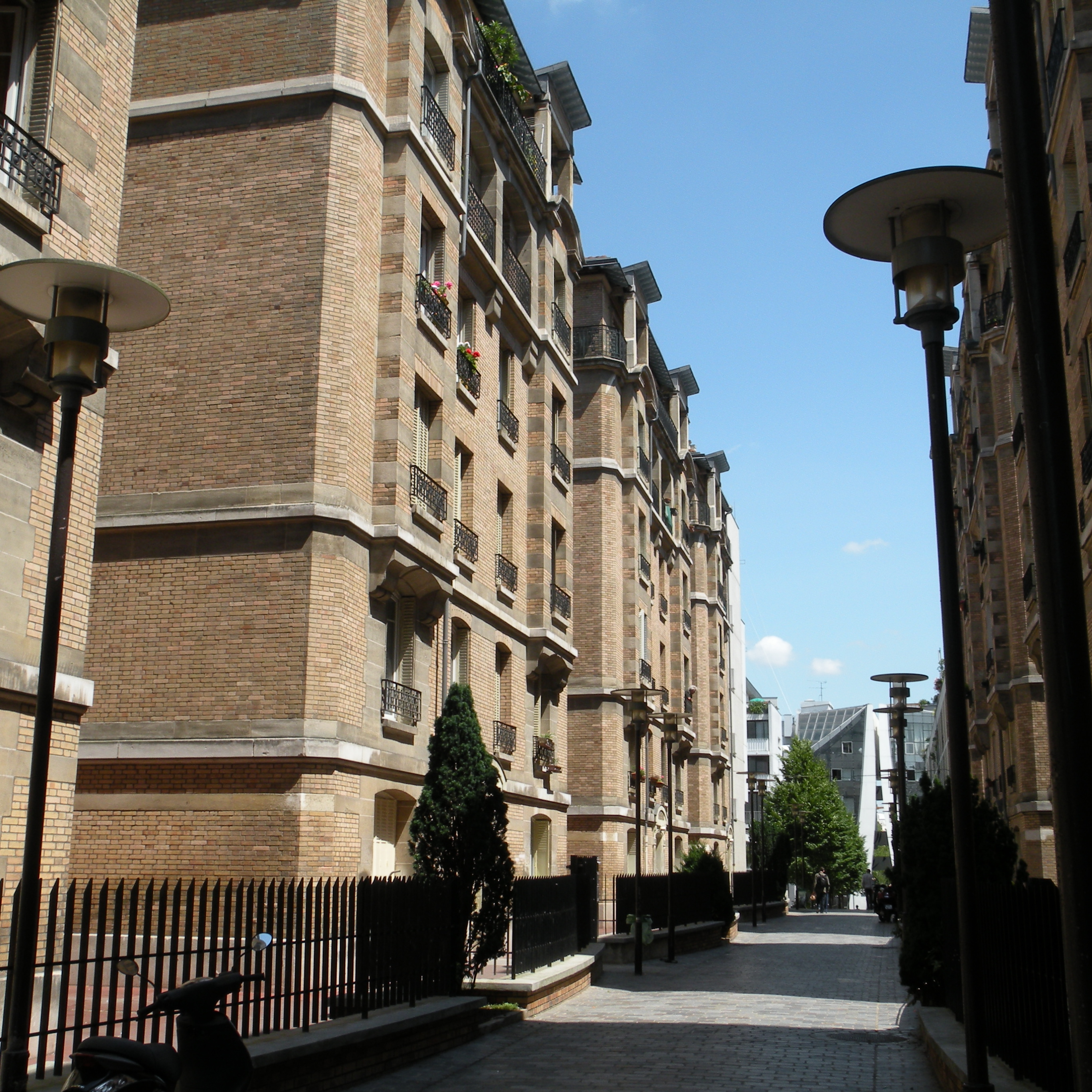
Public housing of the rue Jean Fautrier in the 13th arrondissement of Paris, France

After World War II the French population increased rapidly, while rural exodus brought many people to the cities. In many regions, the war had damaged housing. In order to slow the rapid rise of rents, the government passed a rent control law in 1949. That effectively ended the economic benefits of housing investment. Also, housing construction was strictly regulated, which made building difficult without political support. Also in 1949, another law was adopted, championed by Eugène-Claudius Petit, Minister of Reconstruction and Urban Planning, that promoted a movement toward "superior comfort" – these were the Habitations à Loyers Modérés (H.L.M.) which then replaced the Habitations à Bon Marché (H.B.M.).

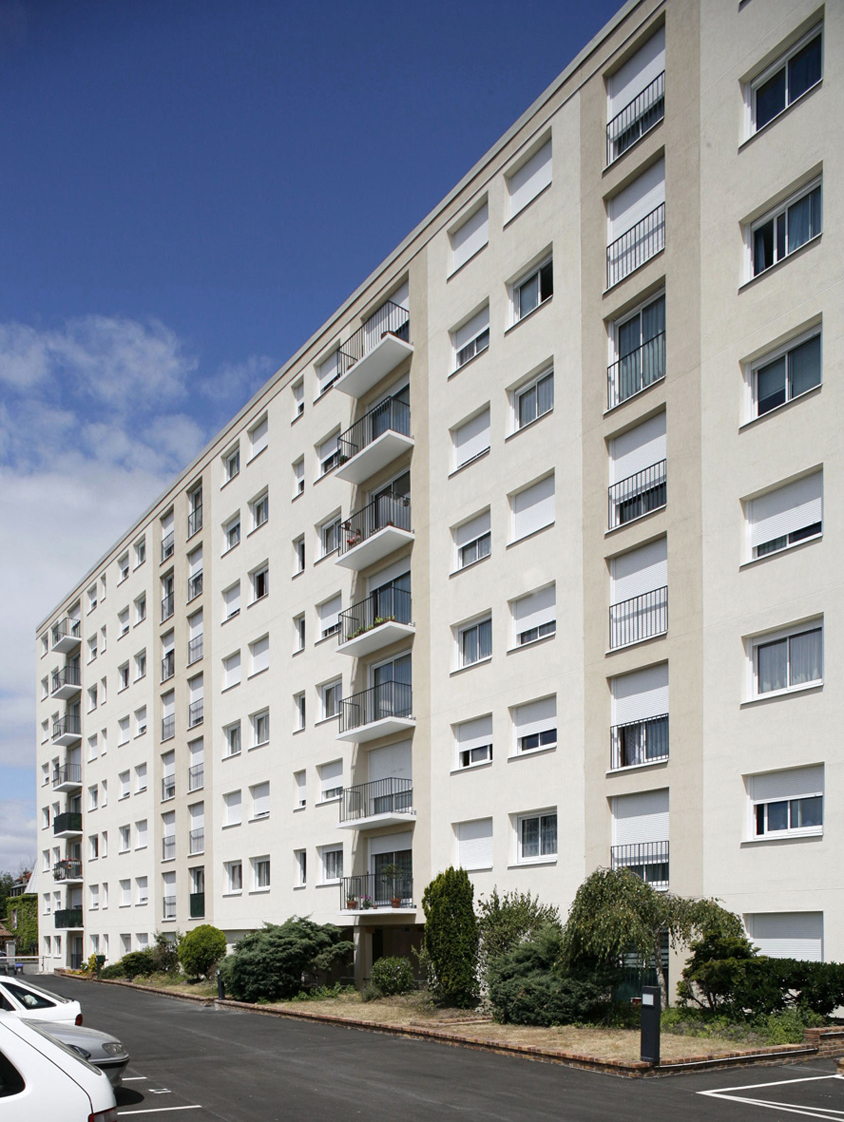
Mid 20th century HLM in Joinville-le-Pont

The government launched a huge construction plan, including the creation of new towns ("villes nouvelles") and new suburbs with HLM (Habitation à Loyer Modéré, "low-rent housing") in 1949. The state had the money and the legal means to acquire the land and could provide some advantages to the companies that built the huge housing complexes of hundreds of apartments. Quality was also effectively regulated, resulting in decent or even top-quality housing, relative to the standards of the 1950s and 1960s.

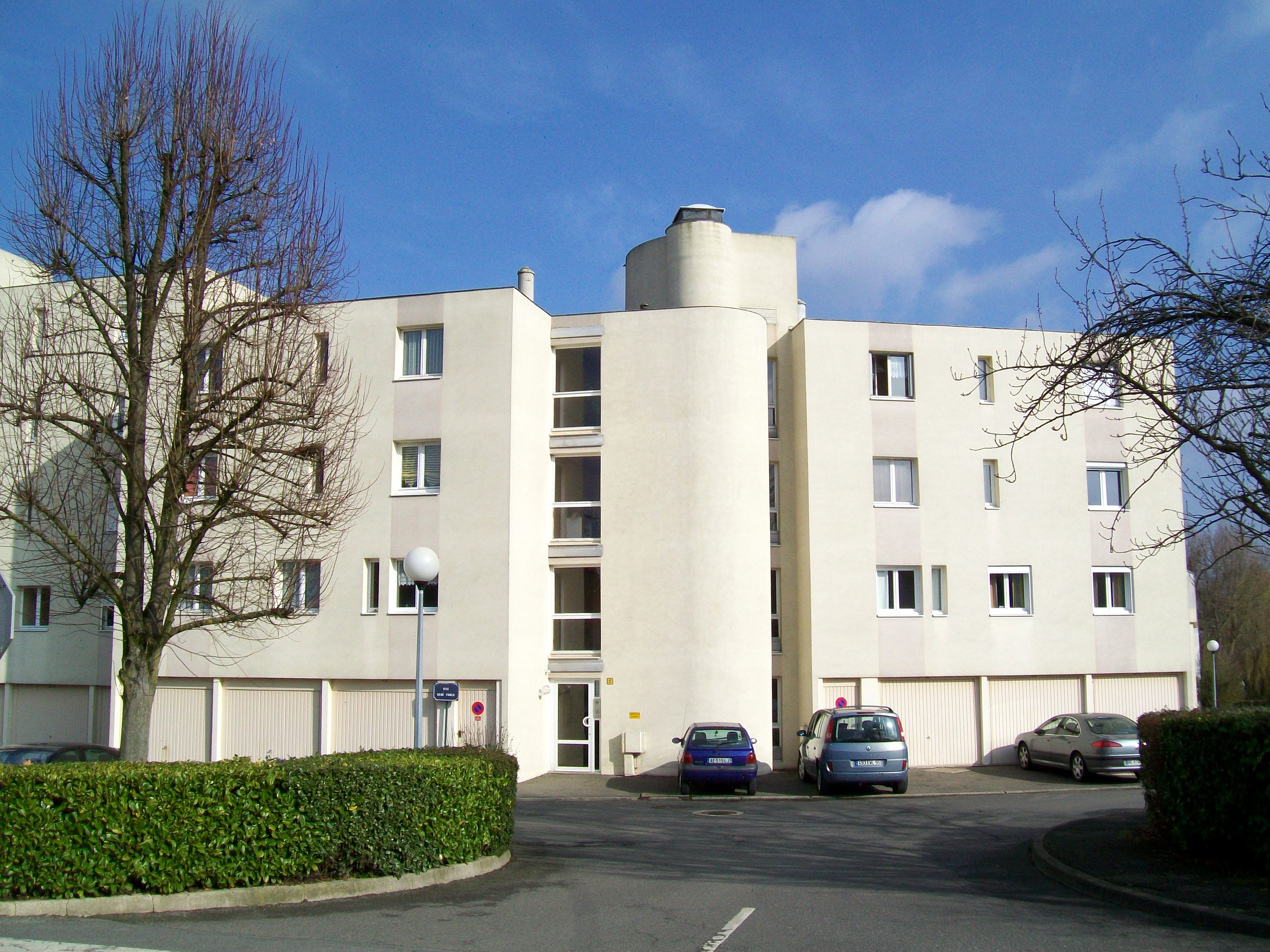
HLM of Jardin Frémin, in Survilliers. Since 2000, 95% of all HLM dwellings are located in small buildings of 20 apartments or fewer.

HLM construction was also a major source of political financing, and building companies were sometimes made to pay back the political party of the mayor who launched an HLM program. That resulted in corruption scandals in the Paris region and elsewhere.

In 1983, the National Housing Council (Conseil National de l'Habitat) was established as an official advisory body to the French government for consultation on housing assistance, social diversity, and home ownership.

In 2000, the Law on Urban Solidarity and Renewal (Loi Solidarite et Renouvellement Urbain) required every town in France to have at least 20% HLM.

In 2013, the Duflot I law increased the HLM requirement to 25% by 2025.

According to a study by the Banque des Territoires in 2025, building new or renovated social housing seems impossible given the budgetary equation in France.

Sometimes the heat problems, especially in 1950s social housing, pose problems of convenience.

== Different kinds of social housing ==
- The HLM, Habitations à loyer modéré, can be private or public; they are the most common and house an estimated thirteen million people
- Subsidized housing (built by private sector)
- Co-operatives

=== Effect on economy ===
The social housing programs in France have an obvious positive effect on the consumption of the households that benefit from them. There is no consensus about the influence on either the rents of the private sector or the prices of real estate.

== See also ==
- Banlieue
- Minister of Housing (France)
- Public housing
- Social housing in France
