= Low-cost housing =

Low-cost housing may refer to:

- Affordable housing
- Subsidized housing
- Low cost housing in Pakistan
