= Law on access to housing and urban renewal =

2014 French law on housing access and urban planning reform

The Law No. 2014-366 of 24 March 2014 for Access to Housing and a Renovated Urban Planning, known as the ALUR law or Duflot II law, is a French law relating to housing.

A legislative translation of proposal 22 of François Hollande's presidential program and brought before Parliament by Cécile Duflot, the law notably aims to introduce rent regulations and a universal rent guarantee. It modifies numerous legislative provisions on the sale and rental of housing, the allocation of social housing, construction standards, and changes important principles in urban planning, in particular the abolition of the floor area ratio, the transfer of powers from communes to inter-commune bodies in the design and implementation of local urban planning (PLU), which becomes an inter-municipal local urban planning (PLUI).

The law, comprising 177 articles and spanning 150 pages of legislative and regulatory texts, has been the subject of strong criticism from housing professionals and liberal economists, who accuse it of slowing construction and discouraging investors. Estimating that the law costs the country between 0.4 and 0.5 points of economic growth, Prime Minister Manuel Valls decided on 29 August 2014 to reform the parts of the law he considered most hindering to construction and growth.:,.

== Background of the text ==
=== Government objectives ===
This law is part of a broader government program on construction (target of 500,000 new homes per year), a draft plan to combat poverty and social exclusion, and an ecological transition project.

For Cécile Duflot, the goal is to "regulate the market, protect citizens, and innovate for better construction".

- In terms of regulation, this involves “sustainably controlling rents,” “simplifying and securing rentals,” “rebalancing housing costs,” “providing clear rules for professionals,” “initiating the ecological transition,” and “modernizing urban planning rules.
- In terms of protection, the aim is to guarantee rents, combat substandard housing, implement a housing policy geared towards rehousing, and prevent the deterioration of condominiums.
- In terms of innovation, the aim is to “promote the development of alternative forms of housing” and “introduce greater transparency in social housing”.

The law aims to create more sustainable cities and housing that consume less energy and are built to meet needs, limiting urban sprawl. by densifying suburban neighborhoods and halting the artificialization of the last remaining natural and agricultural areas on the outskirts of cities, including commercial developments and their space-consuming parking lots.

=== Reservations of economists from the Economic Analysis Council ===
In note number ten from the Economic Analysis Council (CAE), published in October 2013, authors Étienne Wasmer and Alain Trannoy criticize two points of the Alur law: rent control and universal rent guarantees.

Regarding the first point, they believe that assessing reference rents will be very difficult and consider that “before any generalization, it would be essential to conduct a preliminary experiment in pilot areas”.

Regarding the second point, instead of this mechanism and the universal rent guarantee (GUL), they propose the establishment of local joint committees responsible for these disputes, similar to what is done in Quebec.

Although the CAE is responsible for advising the Prime Minister, according to Le Journal du dimanche, the minister's office considered these two economists to be “ultra-liberal” and felt that their report was “out of touch with the market and French culture.”

=== Legislative process ===
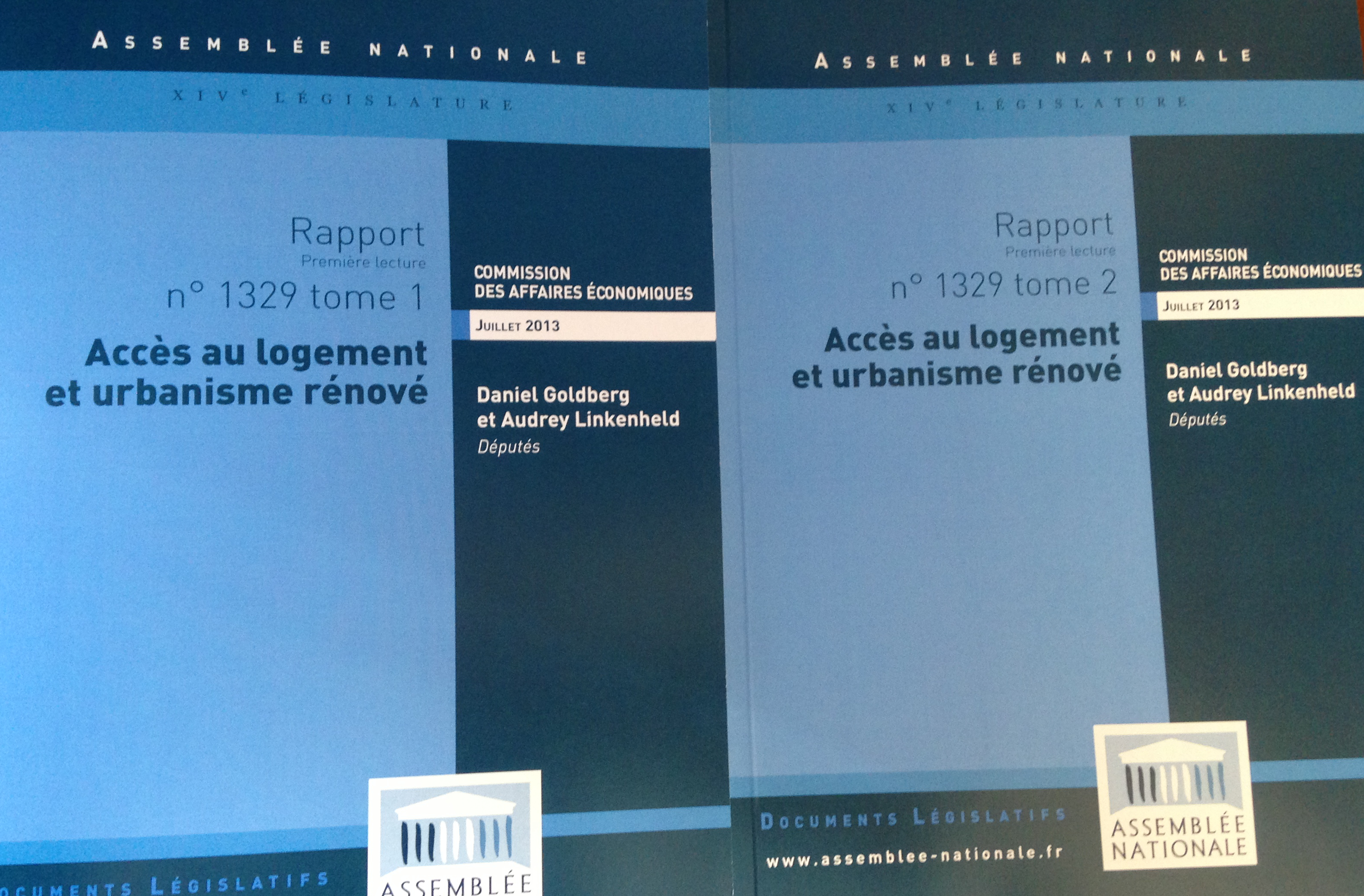
The two volumes of the report by Daniel Goldberg and Audrey Linkenheld for the Economic Affairs Committee of the National Assembly, in July 2013.

- The bill was presented on June 26, 2013 in first reading to the National Assembly.
- The bill was adopted in first reading in the Assembly on September 17, 2013.
- Adopted by the Senate in October 2013, after a few amendments, including the extension of the winter truce until March 31.
- Adopted by the Assembly in second reading on January 16, 2014.
- Adopted at second reading by the Senate on January 31, 2014. The Senate modified the universal rent guarantee (GUL), which is no longer financed by a tax but by public funds.
- Final vote in the Assembly on 19 February 2014.
- On March 20, 2014, most of the ALUR law was deemed constitutional by the Constitutional Council. Four points were rejected: in cases where dependents live with people on low incomes, the combined income of the household must be taken into account, not just that of the tenant; the measures derogating from rent control were relaxed; the transfer of shares in a real estate investment company; the possibility for the general meeting of co-owners to allow short-term rentals to passing customers.

== Main features of the ALUR law ==
=== Measures concerning rentals ===
==== Rent control ====
The law's approach is to consider that despite the law of 6 July 1989 on rental relationships and despite the DALO law, in certain cities or neighborhoods, rents have "become incompatible with household budgets", the reason being "a market that has been left to its own devices for years.” With this law, the government seeks to “eliminate excesses, contain price increases at a manageable level, and thus protect the budgets of French citizens.”

The creation of local rent observatories (associations or public interest groups, approved by the Minister responsible for housing, under conditions set by decree, the nature of the data collected and the conditions for its transmission and use will be set by decree of the Council of State) has the stated objective of "making rents more transparent." These observatories "may be created at the initiative of local authorities, inter-municipal public cooperation establishments with their own tax base responsible for housing, or the State. Their mission includes collecting rent data for a specific geographical area and making representative statistical results on this data available to the public". These observatories will be mandatory in areas of housing shortage

The law designates certain zones as "tense" (28 urban areas with over 50,000 inhabitants), in which it seeks to impose rent price control (through the application of the tax on vacant dwellings). An annual prefectural decree will establish three rent indicators (per housing category and per neighborhood) for these areas:

1. a median reference rent;
2. a median reference rent increased by 20%, beyond which the landlord cannot go;
3. a reduced median reference rent (30% below the median) below which the landlord can request an increase.

A "complementary exceptional rent" (or "exceptional rent supplement") may be added to the basic rent for dwellings deemed particularly "well-located" or more comfortable. However, the tenant has the right to challenge this supplement before the Departmental Conciliation Commission (CDC).

Historically, it is worth noting that in the past—specifically between 1622 and 1649—seven decrees were issued to enforce rent reduction in Paris. The economist Henri Baudrillart observed: "The landlords took no notice of this, and one then witnesses one of those instructive struggles between the natural law which governs interests according to the fluctuations of supply and demand, and the positive law which claims to make it yield to considerations of humanity or politics".

After the measure was cancelled by the Justice system at the end of 2017, a subsequent rise in rents for new leases in Paris was observed in the following months, with the rate of compliant rents plummeting from 40% to 13%. Rent control was once again permitted for "tense areas," on an experimental basis for the next five years, by the 2018 Élan Law.

==== New rental regulations ====
This law aims to reduce tensions between tenant and landlord, and to protect the buyer of a dwelling, as part of the "simplification shock" (a French administrative reform) which reduces the sales file from 120 pages to 20 pages of documents.

Agency fees are now the exclusive responsibility of the owner, but not the fees for drafting the rental lease, the inventory of fixtures (or état des lieux), visiting the dwelling, and compiling the rental application file. The rental file includes the lead diagnosis (CREP), the asbestos diagnosis, the Energy Performance Diagnosis (DPE), the natural and technological risks report (ERNT), and the electrical diagnosis, the cost of which remains shared between the owner and the tenant.

Regarding rental charges (or tenant expenses), the landlord must keep the supporting documents for these charges available to the tenant for a minimum of six months.

Regarding the required documents for a tenant, "to prevent abuse, a list of the documents that can be required from a tenant will be determined. A standard lease form is being created, and standard procedures for drawing up the inventory of fixtures (état des lieux) are defined. For greater fairness, furnished properties used as primary residences are subject to the same obligations as unfurnished properties, and the rental of furnished tourist accommodation is regulated." If the owner wishes to undertake work during the lease term, the tenant must allow this work to take place, but a proportional rent reduction must be applied if the work lasts more than 21 days.

The statutory limitation period (or prescription period) for unpaid rent or charges, or for any action arising from a rental contract, is extended to 3 years; however, the period for annual rent reassessments is reduced to 1 year.

For furnished rentals, the law aligns with that of unfurnished rentals, defining the obligations of landlords and tenants, and establishing the competence of the Departmental Conciliation Commission over disputes relating to furnished properties.

"Block sales" (or ventes à la découpe) will be better regulated (notably including protection for elderly tenants). The rental of furnished tourist accommodation will also be better regulated.

In the event of the dissolution of a Civil Solidarity Pact (pacte civil de solidarité), the tenant may request a judge to retain the dwelling. The judge will assess the situation and grant or deny this right, in the presence of the landlord.

For all leases signed from 27 March 2014:

- When a tenant wishes to give notice to their landlord, they are entitled to a reduced notice period of one month if they obtain social housing, if they are recipients of the Adult Disability Allowance (AAH), or for health reasons.
- When it is the landlord who wants to give notice to their tenant (in the event of sale or repossession), they must take into account the age and income conditions of protected tenants, which have been “relaxed”. Similarly, a landlord purchasing an occupied dwelling can no longer give immediate notice to sell or take possession of the property.
- The deadline for returning the security deposit to the tenant is reduced to one month if the condition of the property at the end of the tenancy is the same as at the beginning, and the interest due in the event of late payment is 10% of the rent (excluding charges) per month of delay.
- In the case of co-living, a standard contract is created, and the rules governing the joint liability of co-tenants and their guarantors change: when a co-tenant leaves, they and their guarantor cannot be jointly liable for rent more than 6 months after the notice has been duly given.

In areas considered to be “high demand,” tenants will be entitled to a reduced notice period of one month to vacate their accommodation.

==== A non-implemented measure: the Universal Rent Guarantee (GUL) ====
A free “universal rent guarantee” (GUL) scheme was due to come into force on January 1, 2016. The guarantee was to be active for a period of 18 months and limited to the local median rent. The cost of this guarantee was estimated in 2014 at €420 million for a full year. This measure targeted the private housing stock and aimed to protect landlords against the risk of unpaid rent, encourage the letting of vacant properties, and prevent evictions. All tenants and landlords would be eligible, but landlords who wished to do so could still opt for a security deposit instead.

This scheme was ultimately not implemented and has been replaced by the Visale scheme, which is aimed at young employees and people in precarious situations

==== Concerning evictions ====
The eviction process is made more difficult by:

- The winter truce for rental evictions now covers 1 November to 31 March.
- Obligation for corporate landlords to report unpaid rents to coordination commissions for prevention of rental evictions (Ccapex, created by this law) before summons, under penalty of inadmissibility;
- Creation of a penalty of 3 years imprisonment and €30,000 fine for a landlord forcing a third party to leave their home without state assistance under usual conditions, using maneuvers, threats, violence, or constraints.

==== Protection of security deposits ====
In the future, security deposits could potentially be safeguarded by being deposited in an account opened with a financial institution in the tenant's name, which could be released by mutual agreement between the tenant and the landlord.

=== Combating "unfit housing" ===
With 450,000 homes classified as “unfit for habitation” or “indecent” in France[clarification needed], the law introduces measures to encourage the renovation of condominiums (by placing greater pressure on landlords to carry out the necessary work if necessary). The legislator has also set itself the goal of combating slum landlords.

For example, individuals convicted of providing accommodation contrary to human dignity can be banned from buying properties for rental for 5 years. A landlord convicted of performing works in an unsanitary or indecent rented property can face a daily penalty of €1,000 per day of delay for non-performance.

For example, individuals convicted of providing “housing that is contrary to human dignity” may be prohibited from purchasing real estate for rental purposes for a period of five years. And a landlord ordered to carry out work on rented accommodation that is unfit for habitation or substandard may be subject to a daily penalty of €1,000 per day of delay for landlords who have not carried out the prescribed work

This text also aims to accelerate the installation of “smoke detectors in all residential buildings” by strengthening the responsibility of the owner. The health of residents is affected by greater consideration of the risks of soil pollution in urban planning documents; the urban planning certificate provided for in Article L. 410-1 of the Urban Planning Code must indicate “whether the land is located on a site listed on this map or on a former industrial or service site of which the urban planning certificate issuing authority is aware” and "the seller or lessor of the land is required to inform the purchaser or tenant in writing [...].

Failing this, and if the pollution found renders the land unsuitable for the purpose specified in the contract, within two years of the discovery of the pollution, the purchaser or tenant may choose to request the termination of the contract or, as the case may be, to obtain a refund of part of the sale price or a reduction in rent. The purchaser may also request the rehabilitation of the land at the seller's expense when the cost of such rehabilitation does not appear disproportionate to the sale price. (A decree of the Council of State shall define the terms and conditions for the application of this article.) In certain cases, “pollution management measures shall be defined taking into account the effectiveness of remediation techniques under economically acceptable conditions, as well as the balance of costs, disadvantages, and advantages of the measures envisaged.”

Following an eviction decision, the “maximum grace period for vacating the premises” is extended (to three years) to allow for a “Dalo appeal.”

Social housing applicants will only have to fill out a single application form, even if they are applying in several departments.

The specific domiciliation system for asylum seekers is maintained.

The government must submit to parliament, within six months of the law's enactment, a report on the advisability of “revising Decree No. 2002-120 of January 30, 2002, on the characteristics of decent housing, adopted for the application of Article 187 of Law No. 2000-1208 of December 13, 2000, on urban solidarity and renewal”; the definition of the minimum living space threshold below which housing is considered substandard could change, and the law could incorporate energy performance into the criteria for defining decent housing.

=== Reform of co-ownerships and real estate professions ===
==== Prevention and management of co-ownership degradation ====
Claude Dilain (president of the National Housing Agency) estimated in 2014 that approximately 1 million of the 7 million condominiums in France are part of degraded condominiums (under the 1965 law, a condominium is considered “degraded” if the maintenance fee is below index 100 and/or when the property manager is no longer able discharge their duties), with a risk of a downward spiral of impoverishment and physical deterioration of the building.

==== Co-ownership management ====
The management of condominiums is being changed by a reform of governance and measures to promote the completion of work.

- The condominium association can now decide on work in the common areas on behalf of the defaulting co-owner, no longer by unanimous vote, but by a majority vote.
- The law makes it mandatory to set up a renovation fund, financed by a percentage of the current expenses and available for significant work.
- Elevation (a source of value) is one possible solution, which can be combined with energy-efficient renovation; owners of the top floor can no longer oppose the creation of one or more additional floors (but they must have priority in purchasing the apartment above theirs. According to Philippe Pelletier, “all calculations show that the sale price of apartments created during an elevation can finance the renovation of a condominium.”

Provisions aim to detect condominiums in difficulty more quickly and strengthen the tools available to public authorities. And to compensate for the lack of information available on condominiums, a “registration register” is being created at the national level

==== Co-ownership syndics ====
Property managers must now open a bank account for each condominium, which means they can no longer earn interest on the cash held by the condominiums they manage, and can only charge additional fees in cases specified by decree.

=== Provisions on construction supply ===
The objective of Chapter IV of the law is to support the construction of new housing. To this end, the law seeks to involve local public land agencies, whose remit now also includes "implementing land strategies to mobilize land and promote sustainable development and combat urban sprawl. These strategies contribute to the construction of housing, particularly social housing, taking into account the priorities defined by local housing programs" (to be created if they are lacking in certain areas). The right of preemption is clarified and, in some cases, simplified.

=== Creation of solidarity-based land organizations ===
In order to transpose Anglo-Saxon Community Land Trusts into French law, solidarity-based land organizations have been created. Their purpose is to acquire and manage land, whether built on or not, with a view to developing housing or community facilities for rental or home ownership, for use as a primary residence. Solidarity-based land organizations are non-profit organizations that aim to enable low-income households to become homeowners by separating the land from the buildings. This contributes to an anti-speculative approach.

=== Urban planning ===
The local urban development plan (PLU) is becoming increasingly important, as is planning at the inter-municipal level to better locate housing and services, with a view to sustainable land use planning based on citizen participation.

- Section 135 of the law specifies how to complete the transition from the land use plan (POS) to the PLU.
- The law provides for the transfer of powers from municipalities to inter-municipal bodies for the design and implementation of local urban development plans (PLU), which become PLUI (considered more strategic and effective). However, the most populous municipalities (25% of municipalities representing at least 20% of the population of a district) may oppose this loss of power.

The law also seeks to better protect agricultural land and natural areas, in particular through the PLUI, which enables elected officials to better contain urban sprawl while “promoting thermal renovation and the fight against energy-inefficient buildings,” according to Jean-Vincent Placé and Joël Labbé.

==== Promotion of participatory, mobile, and nomadic housing ====
The law encourages participatory housing through two new legal statuses and recognizes several forms of lightweight, mobile, and removable housing. Urban planning documents may reserve land where mobile or removable residences (yurts, teepees, mobile homes, caravans, etc.) may be installed.

=== Allocation of social housing and land markets ===
The allocation of social housing is being reformed. The law seeks to make it more transparent in terms of rents and land and real estate markets and aims to simplify the process. Action Logement's social partners will enter into more contractual relationships, and management will be less unilateral on the part of the State.

== Mixed reception of the law ==
=== A law appreciated by EELV and part of the left ===
For Emmanuelle Cosse, the Alur law is one of the major laws of Hollande's presidency, representative of the thinking of the Greens and the left. This law also has many supporters in the PS, led by Martine Aubry (who requested the application of the measure in Lille, where she is mayor), who strongly protested against François Hollande's decision not to implement his commitment no. 22. The PS has also taken a position in favor of “the widest possible application of the rent control mechanism.” The UNEF has also taken a position in favor of rent control, believing that this mechanism protects students' purchasing power. The UNEF is also calling for the effective application of the universal rent guarantee for all, including students.

=== Criticisms from liberal economists ===
Olivier Babeau, in September 2013, echoing standard economic analysis, believes that administrative measures are being used to tackle the consequences (high prices) without addressing the causes. In standard economic analysis, prices rise when goods are scarce, hence the need to produce more and, in this case, build more, in order to bring prices down. Otherwise, there will always be strong pressure on prices due to scarcity. The problem, according to this economist, is that the measures taken will discourage investors and therefore discourage construction: investing will become riskier with measures that tend to block prices and make investment more uncertain by making it difficult to change tenants. Thus, in an op-ed published in Le Monde in August 2014, Mathieu Laine (Sciences Po Paris) ranks it among the “serious missteps” of the first part of François Hollande's term, arguing that it has “literally killed” any desire to purchase rental property.

=== Criticisms from real estate professionals ===
The Federation of Real Estate Professionals has called for “the removal of various rigidities and obstacles to construction, including those introduced by the ALUR law”; another player in the sector, Guy Nafilyan, chairman of the board of directors of Kaufman & Broad, has publicly taken a stand against this law, describing it as ‘absurd’ and “bad".

More specifically, the abolition of the floor area ratio (FAR), introduced in 1958 and subsequently extended to all municipalities with an urban development plan, poses a problem because it refers to measures that could put an end to exemptions already granted. Furthermore, the law considerably increases administrative complexity and slows down the processing of applications, without preventing investors from leaving.

=== International press reception ===
British press, notably The Economist and Financial Times, harshly criticized the law.

=== Questioning by the Valls 2 government ===
==== Reasons for questioning ====
The Valls 2 government estimates that the Alur law “is costing France between 0.4 and 0.5% less growth today.” According to the government, the law focused primarily on relations between landlords and tenants, neglecting to support construction. While the president had promised to build 500,000 new homes each year, only 312,000 homes were built between May 2013 and May 2014.

==== Reviewed parts of the law ====
On August 29, 2014, Manuel Valls announced several amendments to the Duflot law

- The rent control measure will only be applied in Paris, “on an experimental basis,” and, at the request of Martine Aubry, in Lille.
- The universal rent guarantee will be “refocused, particularly on young employees and people in precarious situations”;
- Furthermore, as professionals have complained about the complexity of the law, 50 simplification measures must be taken before January 1, 2015.

These measures are being taken as part of a broader effort to stimulate the housing market

== Bibliography ==
- Raimbert B (2013). À propos du projet de loi pour l'accès au logement et un urbanisme rénové. Gazette du palais: Recueil bimestral, 133(5), 3428-3432.
- DREAL Pays-de-Loire (2013) Identifier et comprendre la rétention foncière-2013-10-09.
- Devaux C (2013) « L'habitat participatif: de l'émergence d'une initiative habitante à son intégration dans l'action publique » (Thesis).
